= Ministers' money =

Historic church tax in Ireland

Ministers' money was a tax payable by householders in certain cities and towns in Ireland to fund the local Church of Ireland minister. It was introduced in 1665, modified in 1827, and abolished in 1857. The cities and towns affected were Dublin, Cork, Limerick, Waterford, Drogheda, Kilkenny, Clonmel, and Kinsale. It was levied as a rate of up to one shilling in the pound (i.e. 5%) on the property's rateable value. The valuation, to a maximum of £60, was done by commissioners appointed by the Lord Lieutenant. Churchwardens appointed by the local minister collected ministers' money on the quarter days: Christmas, Lady Day, St John's Day, and Michaelmas. The 1689 Irish Parliament, which the Catholic James II summoned during the Williamite War, abolished minister's money; after James lost the war, William and Mary's 1695 Parliament annulled the 1689 one. A 1723 act provided that, in Dublin, the same valuation could be used both for ministers' money and for calculating cess, a separate local rate used for public works and poor relief. Thereafter, cess rates were often expressed in terms of pence per shilling of minister's money.

Ministers' money was resented because it was a regressive tax and applied only in towns with a Catholic majority. In rural areas, tithes were a similar grievance, and the 1830s Tithe War ended when the Tithe Commutation Act 1838 replaced tithes with "tithe-rentcharges"; but this did not apply to ministers' money. Church rate, separate from ministers' money and tithes, was abolished by Church Temporalities Act 1833 (3 & 4 Will. 4. c. 37). Another grievance was that the valuations for ministers' money were done infrequently and might not reflect recent improvements or decline in the property or its neighbourhood. An 1838 proposal by Daniel O'Connell to bring ministers' money into the terms of the Irish Poor Law was withdrawn. An 1848 committee of the Commons recommended its abolition, and motions to that effect were proposed by MPs Francis Murphy (1842 and 1844) and William Trant Fagan (six times 1847–54). A petition of Cork residents was laid on the table of the Lords in 1846. In 1854, Sir John Young, the Chief Secretary for Ireland, introduced an Act which reduced the rated charge by one quarter and charged the municipal authority (borough corporation or town commissioners) rather than the minister with collecting it. The Ecclesiastical Commissioners of Ireland forwarded the money from the municipality to the minister, making up the reduction from its own funds. In 1857, Fagan and Francis Beamish introduced a private member's bill, which was successfully enacted, to replace ministers' money with a direct subvention of ministers by the Ecclesiastical Commissioners. Some members of the Church of Ireland objected to the act as confiscation of church property, and saw it as a prelude to disestablishment, which eventually came under the Irish Church Act 1869.

== Sources ==
- Akenson, Donald H. (1971). The Church of Ireland : ecclesiastical reform and revolution, 1800-1885. Yale University Press. pp. 199–201. ISBN 978-0-300-01448-8.
- Davis, Thomas Osborne (1893). Gavan Duffy, Charles (ed.). The Patriot Parliament of 1689: With Its Statutes, Votes, and Proceedings. T. Fisher Unwin.
- Select Committee on Ministers' Money (Ireland) (28 July 1848). Report together with the minutes of evidence, appendix, and index. Sessional papers. Vol. HC 1847-8 xvii (559) 401. House of Commons.
