= John Daly (Irish politician, born 1834) =

John Daly (1834 – August 1888) was an Irish Nationalist politician. He was elected to the United Kingdom House of Commons as a Home Rule League Member of Parliament (MP) for Cork City at the 1880 general election, and joined the new Irish Parliamentary Party in 1882. He resigned his seat on 11 February 1884.

Parliament of the United Kingdom
Preceded by William Goulding; Nicholas Daniel Murphy	Member of Parliament for Cork City; 1880 – 1884; With: Charles Stewart Parnell	Succeeded by John Deasy; Charles Stewart Parnell
