= Francis Lyons =

Francis Lyons may refer to:

- Francis Lyons (1798–1862), member of parliament for Cork
- F. S. L. Lyons (1923–1983) (Francis S.L. Lyons), Irish historian
- Frank Lyons (born 1954) (Francis R. Lyons), American Anglican bishop

== See also ==
- Francis Lyon (disambiguation)
- Lyons (surname)
