= Francis Lyon =

Francis Lyon may refer to:

- Francis D. Lyon (1905–1996), American film editor
- Francis Lyon (footballer) (1895–1964), Australian footballer
- Francis S. Lyon (1800–1882), American and Confederate States politician

== See also ==
- Frances Bowes-Lyon, Countess of Strathmore and Kinghorne (1832–1922), British noblewoman
- Francis Lyons (disambiguation)
- Lyon (disambiguation)
