= J. F. X. O'Brien =

Irish politician

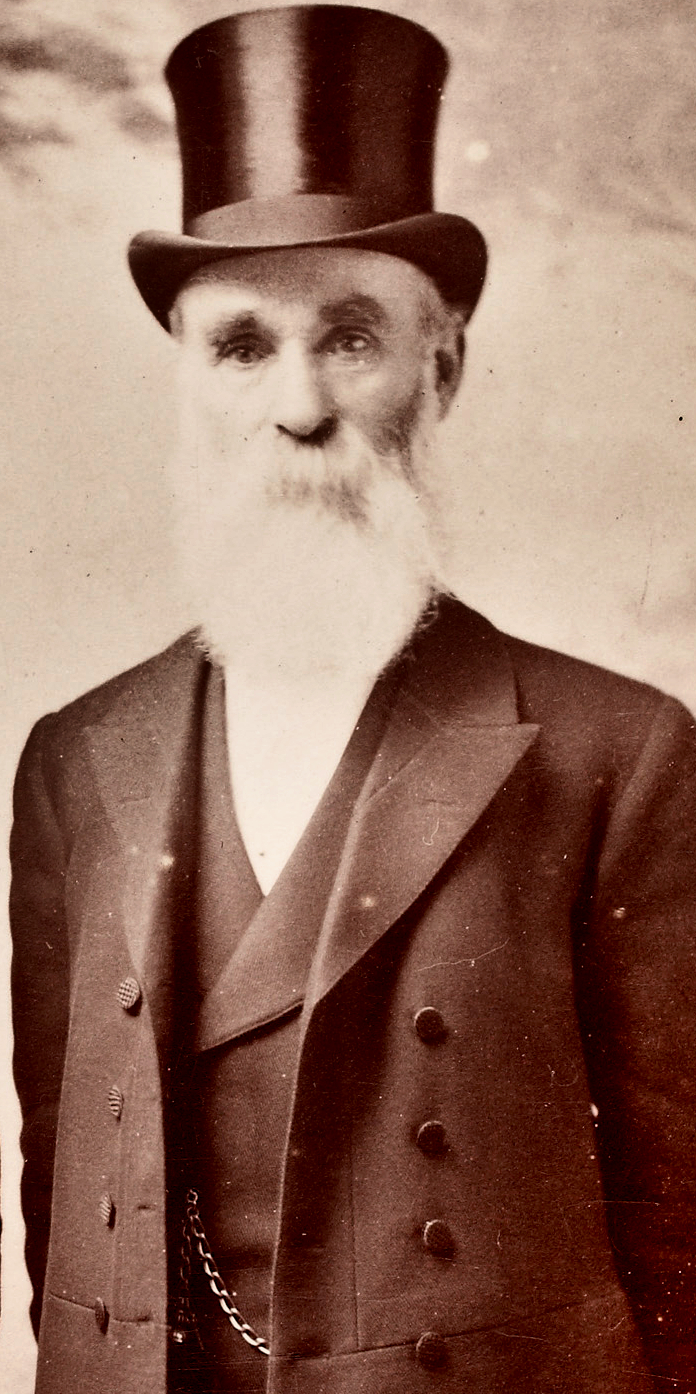
- O'Brien in 1894

Member of Parliament
- In office 27 November 1885 – 8 February 1906
- Preceded by: Constituency established
- Succeeded by: Augustine Roche
- Constituency: South Mayo (1885–1895); Cork City (1895–1906)

President of the Irish Republican Brotherhood
- In office 1882–1891
- Preceded by: Charles Kickham
- Succeeded by: John O'Leary

Personal details
- Born: James Francis Xavier O'Brien; 13 October 1828 Dungarvan, County Waterford, Ireland
- Died: 28 May 1905 (aged 76) London, England
- Resting place: Glasnevin Cemetery
- Party: Irish National Federation
- Other political affiliations: Irish Parliamentary

James Francis Xavier O'Brien (13 or 16 October 1828 – 28 May 1905) was an Irish nationalist Fenian revolutionary in the 1860s. He was later elected to the House of Commons of the United Kingdom of Great Britain and Ireland, as a Member of Parliament (MP) in the Irish Parliamentary Party.

== Life ==
=== Early life ===
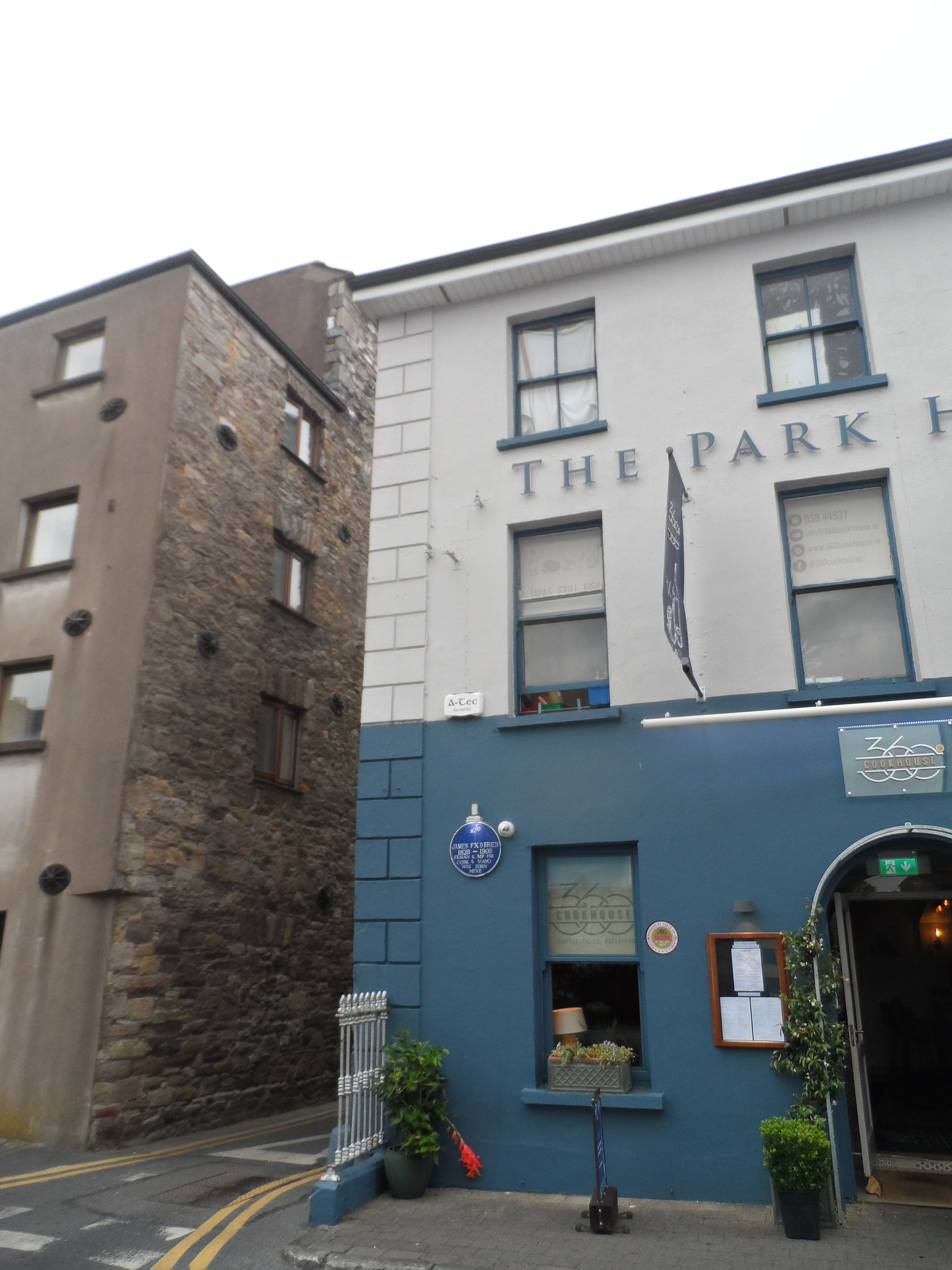
O'Brien's birthplace, Dungarvan, with blue plaque

O'Brien was born in Dungarvan, County Waterford to the merchant family of Timothy and Catherine O'Brien.

=== Early Fenian activity ===
O'Brien was studying divinity in St. John's College, Waterford when he became caught up in the Young Ireland rebellion of 1848. During the summer of 1849, he organised a new revolutionary secret society in Dungarvan. In September 1849, he participated an attack, organised by James Fintan Lalor, on Cappoquin police barracks and evaded arrest, fleeing to Wales on one of his father's merchant ships for a number of months.

In 1854 he won a scholarship to study medicine at Queen's College, Galway. However, a year later he left for Paris, with his friend John O'Leary, where he continued his studies, attending the École de Médecine. Health problems did not allow him to graduate, however. O'Brien was advised by Dominic Corrigan to take a holiday to warm climate for the sake of his health. In response, O'Brien elected to travel to New Orleans, Louisiana.

=== In Louisiana ===
Upon his arrival to New Orleans, O'Brien was persuaded to participate in William Walker's Filibuster War in Nicaragua. The expedition was halted by the US Navy in April 1857 and O'Brien was amongst the crew captured. Together they were imprisoned, and during that time O'Brien feared he would be assassinated. Reluctantly, O'Brien called upon the services of the British consul in New Orleans, who helped secure his release. Next, O'Brien worked as a replacement lecturer for Richard D'Alton Williams at the Jesuit College in Baton Rouge, Louisiana. While still in Louisiana, in 1858 he met James Stephens, and joined the Fenian Brotherhood.

Following the outbreak of the American Civil War in April 1861, O'Brien was an assistant surgeon in the Confederate Army in New Orleans However, this army work caused his civilian business to go bankrupt, and by November 1862 O'Brien was convinced that he should return to Ireland.

=== Return to Ireland ===
In late 1862, he returned to Ireland, settling in Cork, where he enrolled in the Irish Republican Brotherhood. By 1864 he was a contributor to the Irish People, a Fenian newspaper. Using the pen name ‘De L'Abbaye’ (The Abbot), O'Brien wrote what were considered to be anti-clerical articles, although personally O'Brien was still a devout Catholic. When the Irish People and the Irish Republican Brotherhood's leadership were suppressed in September of 1865, O'Brien was forced underground for a number of months.

During a meeting of Cork IRB in February 1867, O'Brien voted against Thomas J. Kelly's proposal for an uprising, on the basis that the IRB did not have any significant supplies of weapons. O'Brien was voted down, and despite his grievances, he participated in the 1867 Fenian Rising. On 6 March, he took part in an IRB attack on Ballyknockane police barracks, near Mourneabbey, which surrendered. His group was later dispersed by a unit of British Army infantry and he was arrested near Kilmallock. In May 1867, he was tried for high treason, convicted, and sentenced to death, the last man in Ireland to be given such a sentence. His sentence was commuted, and he was placed in solitary confinement for much of his sentence. He was released in 1869 as part of an amnesty for Fenians following a campaign by Charles Kickham.

Following his release, O'Brien was made part of the IRB Supreme Council (and possibly its President). It was in this capacity that O'Brien drafted its constitution, which was adopted on 18 August 1869. It was also in this capacity that O'Brien supported a plan to nominate Jeremiah O'Donovan Rossa as a member of parliament. The idea was that if O'Donovan Rossa, who was already known to the public as a Fenian, was elected to as an MP, this would be highly embarrassing for the British state. O'Donovan Rossa was indeed elected on 25 November 1869, although later disqualified on 10 February 1870 due to his previous conviction for treason.

By 1873, O'Brien was no longer a member of the IRB Supreme Council and had departed from the IRB.

=== Electoral politics ===
Following his departure from the IRB, O'Brien had focused on commercial activity in Cork. However, in November 1885 was approached by none other than Charles Stewart Parnell, leader of the Irish Parliamentary Party, with a proposition. Parnell had previously requested that the Irish National League withdraw the nomination of Pat Nally as their South Mayo candidate in an upcoming election. Nally had been previously arrested and convicted of participating in the "Crossmolina Riot", which had received national press coverage across the United Kingdom. The Mayo branch of the Irish National League wanted to make Nally an MP in protest but Parnell did not like the idea. Instead, Parnell wished to make O'Brien the MP for South MP, trading upon O'Brien's reputation as a Fenian rebel. O'Brien agreed and became the MP to represent South Mayo from 1885 to 1895 and as Anti-Parnellite for Cork City from 1895 to 1905. O'Brien was not very active in the Parliament, merely using his position to vote with the Irish Parliamentary Party. However, behind the scenes he held leading positions in the Irish Parliamentary Party as treasurer from 1886.

Following the split in the IPP over Parnell's affair with Mrs. O'Shea, O'Brien joined the anti-Parnellites in the Irish National Federation, and was later the United Irish League of Great Britain (general secretary, 1900–1905).

He died at his London residence (39 Gauden Road, Clapham) on 28 May 1905, and was buried in Glasnevin cemetery, Dublin.

Parliament of the United Kingdom
New constituency	Member of Parliament for South Mayo; 1885 – 1895	Succeeded by Michael Davitt
Preceded by Maurice Healy; William O'Brien	Member of Parliament for Cork City; 1895 – 1905; With: William O'Brien 1900–1904, 1904–1905	Succeeded by Augustine Roche; William O'Brien
Other offices
Preceded by Thomas J. Kelly	President of the Irish Republican Brotherhood c.1869 – c.1872	Succeeded by Charles Kickham

== Sources ==
- Fenian Memories, Dr. Mark F. Ryan, M.H. Gill & Son, Ltd, Dublin, 1945
