= Hamblin and Porter's Grammar School =

Former private school in Cork, Ireland

- Cork; Ireland

Information
- Type: Private school
- Established: 1824
- Closed: 1855

Hamblin and Porter's Grammar School was a private boarding and day school in Cork, Ireland. Founded by Daniel Hamblin in 1824, the school operated at several locations in central Cork before its pupils transferred to the Collegiate School in 1855.

== History ==
Daniel Hamblin established his school at 58 George's Street in Cork in 1824. In 1826, it became Hamblin and Porter's boarding and day school and moved to 73 South Mall. Contemporary descriptions of the premises recorded a schoolroom, two classrooms, a library, two dormitories, a dressing room and a playground.

The school's address was also sometimes recorded as Queen Street, now Father Mathew Street, near South Mall. In 1855, the pupils moved to 19 South Mall, where the institution continued as the Collegiate School under Francis William Newell.

== Curriculum ==
The school provided instruction in classical and mathematical subjects. A surviving report card belonging to former pupil Denny Lane records his study of the Greek Testament and works by Lucian, Homer and Xenophon. Latin studies included works by Terence, Juvenal, Livy, Virgil and Horace. The report card also lists geometry, algebra, history and writing.

== Notable former pupils ==
Notable former pupils included:

- Denny Lane, businessman, writer and nationalist.
- Joseph Philip Ronayne, civil engineer and Home Rule League politician.
- George Salmon, mathematician, theologian and provost of Trinity College Dublin.
- John Travers Lewis, the first Anglican bishop of Ontario.
