= Herbert Baldwin =

Herbert Baldwin may refer to:

- Herbert Baldwin (politician) (1782–1861), Irish politician, Member of Parliament (MP) 1832–1837
- Herbert Baldwin (cricketer) (1893–1969), English first class cricketer
