= 1891 Cork City by-election =

UK parliamentary by-election

The 1891 Cork City by-election was a parliamentary by-election held for the United Kingdom House of Commons constituency of Cork City on 6 November 1891. It arose as a result of the death of the sitting member, Charles Stewart Parnell of the Irish Parliamentary Party.

== Background ==
In the year before the by-election, the Irish Parliamentary Party had split in two after Parnell, its leader, had been cited as co-respondent in a divorce case, causing a scandal. A majority of the party's MPs left to found an Anti-Parnellite group. Three successive by-elections showed public support favouring the Anti-Parnellites. Even with Parnell dead, the bitterness that had arisen in the course of the party split was still deep.

== Campaign ==
The Parnellites nominated their most prominent figure, John Redmond, for the seat. As the sitting MP for North Wexford, Redmond had to resign in order to contest the by-election. The anti-Parnellites nominated Martin Flavin, a local butter merchant and member of Cork Corporation. There was also a Conservative candidate, Captain Dominick Sarsfield, a landowner, Orangeman, and descendant of Patrick Sarsfield.

== Result ==
The Parnellites would have expected to do well in their former leader's own constituency, although the other member - this was a two-seat constituency - was Maurice Healy, a strong anti-Parnellite. In the event, the result was a big success for Flavin, who got 3,669 votes as against 2,157 for Redmond and 1,161 for Sarsfield - a majority of 1,512 (and 351 over the other two combined). Flavin only held the seat until the following year's general election, when he retired due to ill-health. Redmond was subsequently elected in a by-election in Waterford City and held the seat until his death in 1918; Dominick Sarsfield was taken ill shortly after the election and died the following February.

Cork City by-election, 1891
Party	Candidate	Votes	%	±%
Irish National Federation	Martin Flavin	3,669	52.51	N/A
Irish National League	John Redmond	2,157	30.87	N/A
Irish Unionist	Captain Dominick Sarsfield	1,161	16.62	New
Majority		1,512	21.64	N/A
Turnout		6,987	68.0	N/A
Irish National Federation gain from Irish National League		Swing	N/A	
