= Martin Flavin (politician) =

Martin Flavin (1841– 30 December 1916) was an Irish nationalist politician, butter merchant and prominent businessman from Cork. He was a Member of Parliament (MP) from 1891 to 1892.

Flavin was chairman of the Cork–Macroom Railway Co. and a director of the Cork Imperial Hotel Co. Being an alderman on Cork Corporation, he was selected to stand as the Anti-Parnellite Irish National Federation candidate in the 1891 Cork City by-election to fill the Westminster vacancy caused by Charles Stewart Parnell's death. He won the by-election with a large majority, defeating both the future nationalist leader, John Redmond, and a Unionist candidate, but due to ill health he did not stand at the next general election, held in July 1892, when both of Cork City's two seats were won by Anti-Parnellites.

He died at his Summerhill, Cork residence on 30 December 1916.

== Notes ==
Parliament of the United Kingdom
Preceded by Charles Stewart Parnell; Maurice Healy	Member of Parliament for Cork City; 1891 – 1892; With: Maurice Healy	Succeeded by William O'Brien; Maurice Healy
