= Denny Lane =

Irish businessman and nationalist public figure (1818–1895)

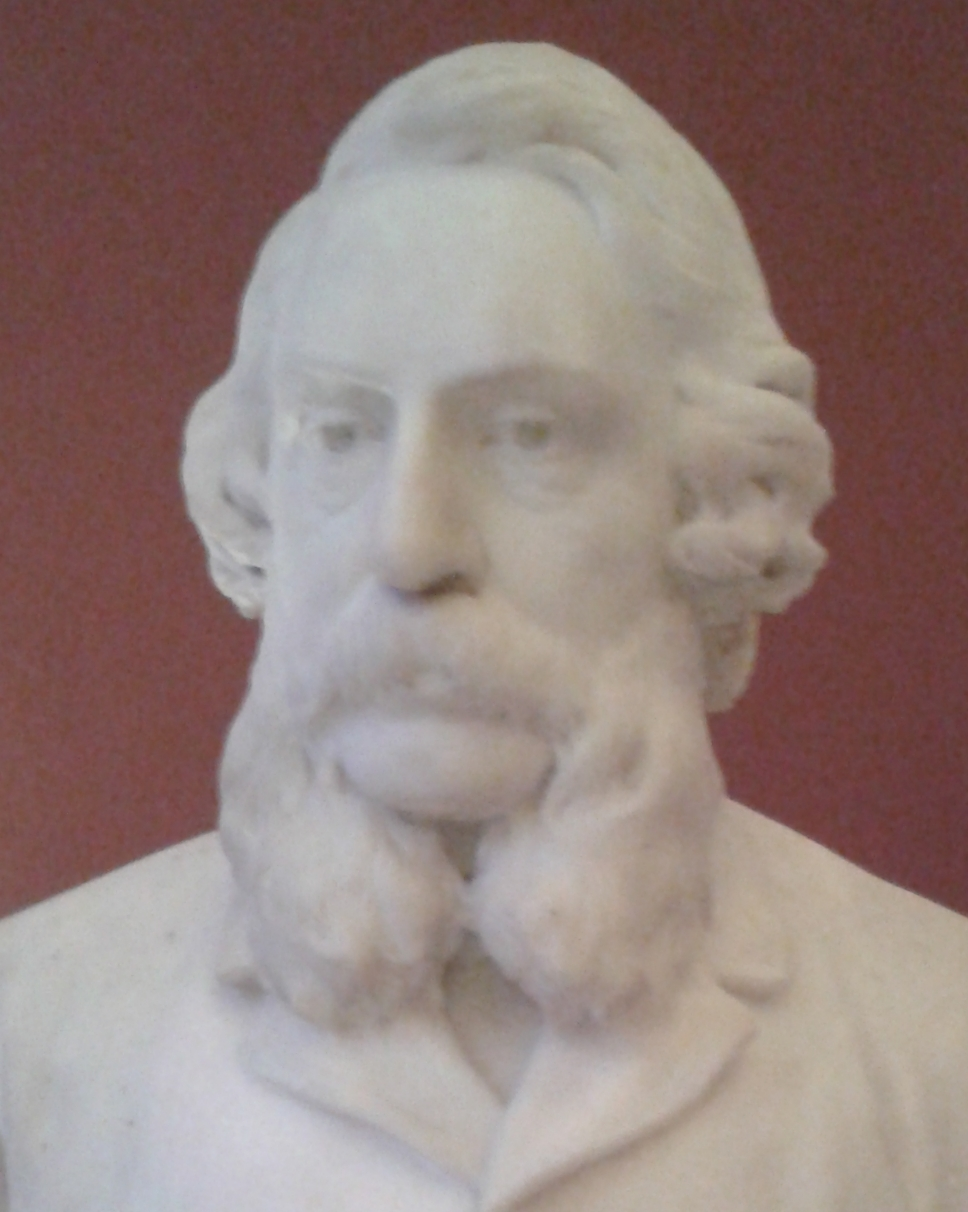
An 1889 bust of Denny Lane sculpted by John Lawlor

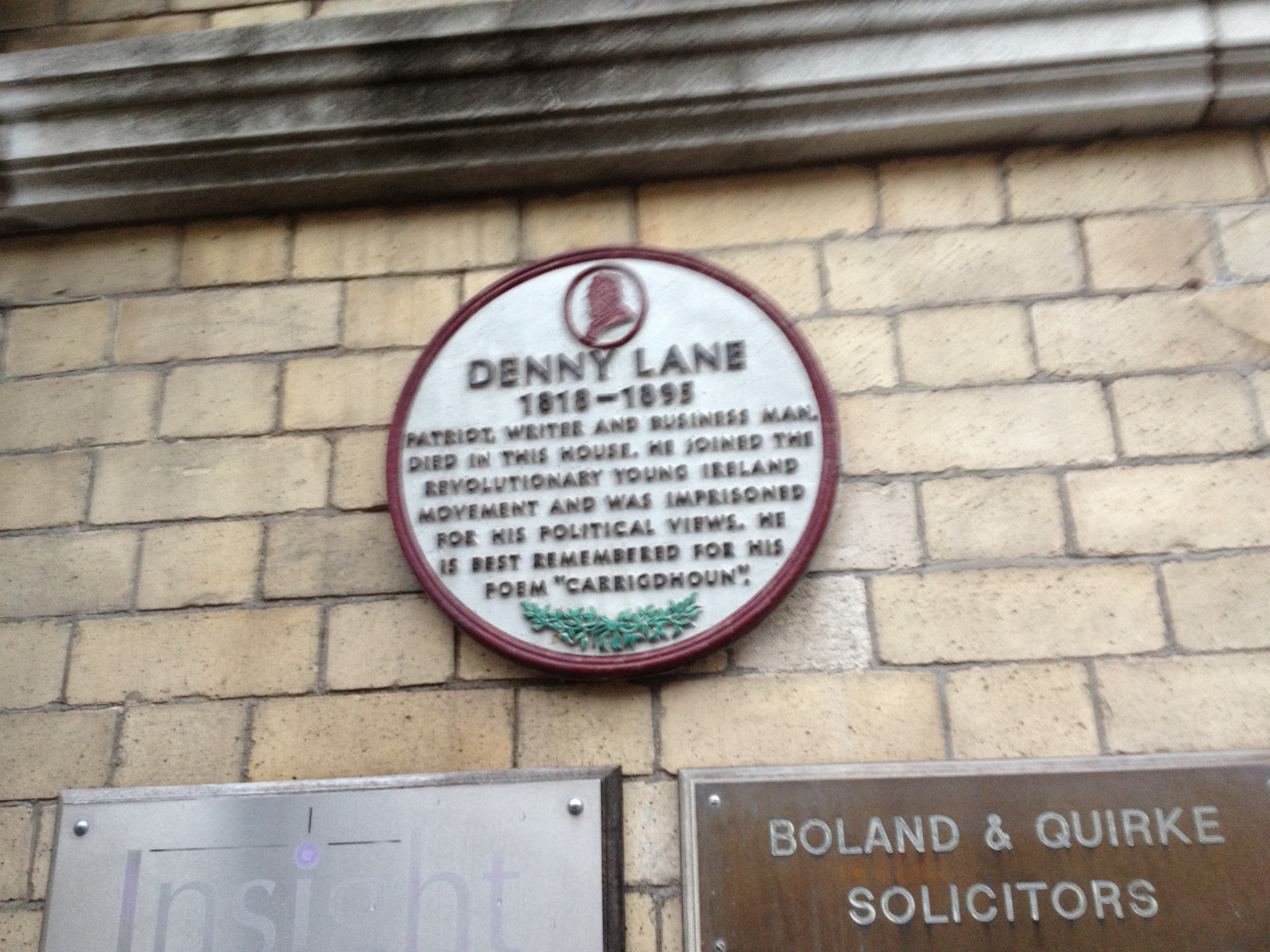
Plaque on Cork's South Mall

Denny Lane (4 December 1818 – 29 November 1895) was an Irish businessman and nationalist public figure in Cork city, and in his youth a Young Irelander.

Although a Catholic, he graduated from the mainly Protestant Trinity College, Dublin, where he joined the College Historical Society, became a friend of Charles Gavan Duffy and Thomas Davis, and moved in the circle from which the Young Ireland movement sprang. He was called to the bar from Inner Temple. Under the pen name "Domhnall na Glanna" or "Domhnall Gleannach", he wrote Irish nationalist and romantic lyrics which were published in The Nation in the 1840s, the best known being "Carraigdhoun" (or "Lament of the Irish Maiden") and "Kate of Araglen". Lane and his college classmate Michael Joseph Barry were the most prominent Young Irelanders in Cork, and were interned in Cork City Gaol after the Young Irelander Rebellion of 1848. Thomas Carlyle on his 1849 Irish tour met Lane on 17 July, describing him as a "fine brown Irish figure, Denny; distiller – ex-repealer; frank, hearty, honest air; like Alfred Tennyson a little".

Lane took over his father's distillery in Cork and later started several industrial businesses near the city, with mixed success. He took an interest in technology and industrial innovation. He was on the boards of the Macroom Railway Company and the Blackrock and Passage Railway Company, and also involved in Cork's School of Art, School of Music, and Literary & Scientific and Historical & Archaeological societies. He stood for Parliament in the 1876 Cork City by-election, but the Home Rule vote was split with John Daly, so that unionist William Goulding was elected.

He died at his home on Cork's South Mall in November 1895, aged 77.

== Bibliography ==
- Lane, Denny (1883). "Clerk Maxwell's 'Devil on Two Sticks'". Nature. 28 (709): 104. Bibcode:1883Natur..28..104L. doi:10.1038/028104c0. ISSN 0028-0836. S2CID 4140975.
- Lane, Denny (26 September 1885). "On the Elementary Principles of the Gas-Engine". Scientific American. 20 (508): 8109–12. doi:10.1038/scientificamerican09261885-8109supp. ISSN 0036-8733. Archived from the original on 4 March 2016.
- Lane, Denny (November 1885). "Then and Now. A Literary Retrospect. Part I". The Irish Monthly. 13 (149). Irish Jesuit Province: 607–616. JSTOR 20497332.
- Lane, Denny (December 1885). "Then and Now. A Literary Retrospect. Part II". The Irish Monthly. 13 (150). Irish Jesuit Province: 644–656. JSTOR 20497338.
- Lane, Denny (3 July 1886). "Gas Engineering and Modern Science". Scientific American. 22 (548 supp): 8750–8753. doi:10.1038/scientificamerican07031886-8750bsupp. ISSN 0036-8733. OCLC 5842229501.
- Lane, Denny (1888). "Water-gas: its chemistry, history, and prospects". The Iron and Coal Trades Review.
- Lane, Denny (February 1891). "Art as a Profession and as a Branch of Education". The Irish Monthly. 19 (212). Irish Jesuit Province: 73–81. JSTOR 20498152.
- Lane, Denny (9 October 1891). "Distribution of energy by gas". The Electrician.
- Lane, Denny (March 1893). "The Irish Accent in English Literature". The Irish Monthly. 21 (237). Irish Jesuit Province: 151–156. JSTOR 20498492.
- Lane, Denny (May 1893). "The Irish Industries Association". The Irish Monthly. 21 (239). Irish Jesuit Province: 237–241. JSTOR 20498514.
