= Joseph Leycester =

Irish politician

Joseph Leycester (1784 – 27 August 1859) was an Irish politician.

Leycester lived in Cork, where he was the agent for the Bank of Ireland. He served as Sheriff of Cork City in 1807, and as Lord Mayor of Cork in 1833. During the 1835 UK general election, he ran for a seat in Cork City as a member of the Conservative Party and won. However, he was unseated following a petition on 18 April that year. He ran again in Cork City during the 1837 UK general election but was not elected.

Civic offices
Preceded by Richard Lane; Charles Cole	Sheriff of Cork City; 1807; With: George S. Waggett	Succeeded by William Jameson; Anthony Perrier
Preceded by John Besnard	Lord Mayor of Cork; 1833	Succeeded by Charles Perry
Parliament of the United Kingdom
Preceded by Daniel Callaghan; Herbert Baldwin	Member of Parliament for Cork City; January – April 1835; With: James Chatterton	Succeeded by Daniel Callaghan; Herbert Baldwin
