= John Maguire (MP) =

Irish writer and politician

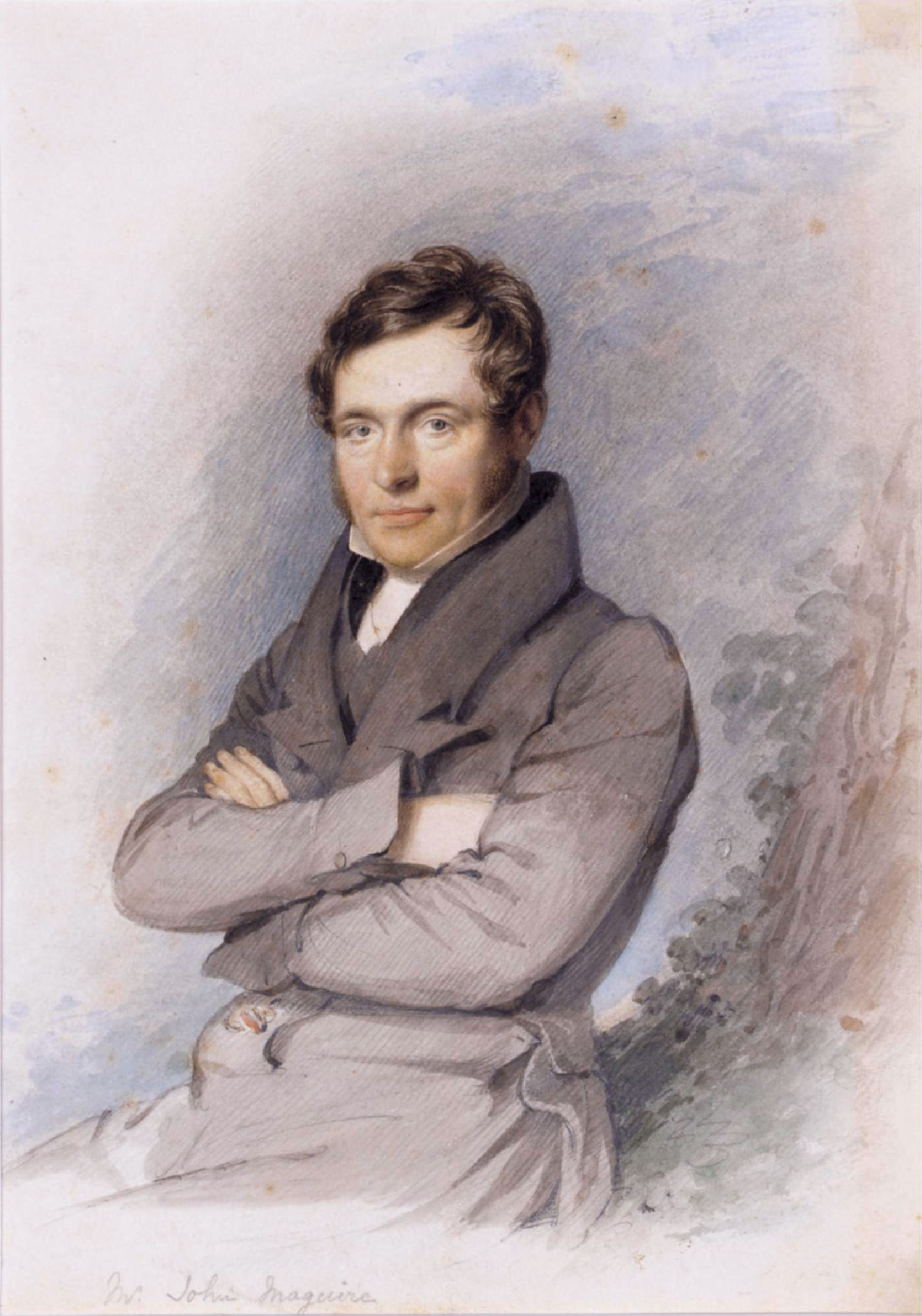
John Francis Maguire (1815-1872) (Daniel Maclise)

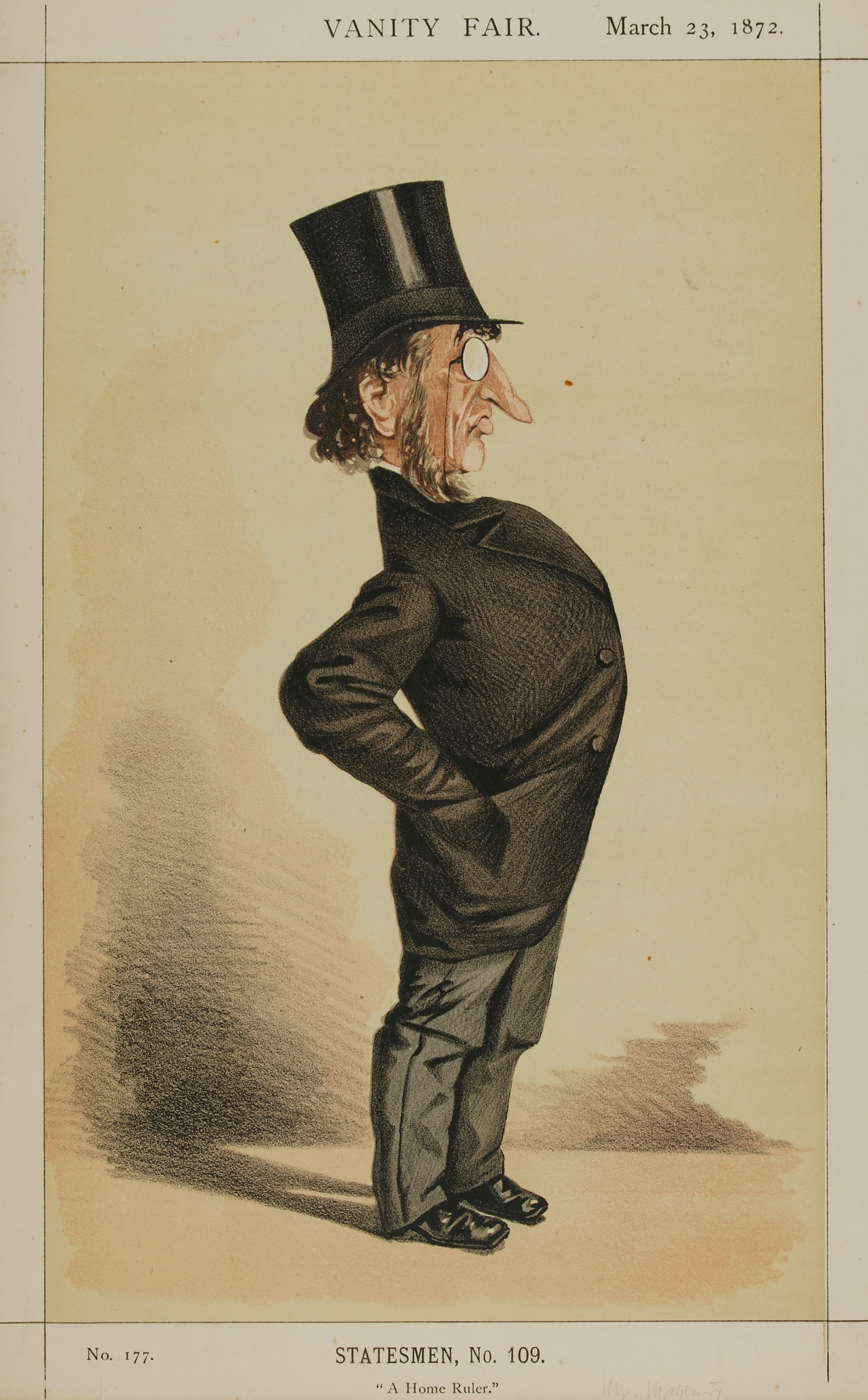
"A Home Ruler". Caricature by Cecioni published in Vanity Fair in 1872

John Francis Maguire (1815 – 1 November 1872) was an Irish writer and politician. He was elected as Member of Parliament (MP) for Dungarvan in 1852. He was subsequently an MP for Cork City, serving between 1865 and his death in 1872.

He wrote for his Newspaper, the Cork Examiner and wrote several books, including "The Irish in America" in 1867. He actively supported the Liberal Party's legislation on the disestablishment of the Church as well as the land question. Then in 1870, John Maguire joined the Home Rule party for Ireland.

On 1 May 1872, Maguire responded to Conservative MP John Henry Scourfield, in a debate over the Women's Disabilities Removal Bill, an early women's suffrage bill. Scourfield had argued that Jane Austen would be against women's suffrage, but Maguire responded that he thought she would be for it, because, were she alive, she would have allied herself with the deepest thinkers and most brilliant writers of the day, who supported it. This is believed to have been the first debate over Austen in official parliamentary business.

Maguire made many contributions to political debate. His book "The Irish in America" covered such topics as their views towards slavery, the troubles they found once arriving in America, the overcrowding of immigrants within the large cities and the poverty they became accustomed to. There were other parts of this book that were not directly related to those subjects, but that of the actual passage and perils on the seas that those travelling experienced.

He was interested in explicitly educating his Irish readership, bringing attention to the reasons for committing crime, and pointing out some of the positive traits the Irish brought with them, such as a love for life, a strong sense of loyalty, and a strong work ethic. He also had a sincere concern about the drinking problem among the Irish.

He was an ardent advocate for the fair treatment of Roman Catholic Irish soldiers and their families. He was particularly exercised by the unfair pupil admissions policy of such charitable institutions as the Royal Hibernian Military School; where there was clear evidence of discrimination against the children of Roman Catholic soldiers, many of whom had died in the service of the Crown.

In 1843 he married Margaret Bailey, second daughter of Robert Bailey of Passage West, Cork, and sister-in-law of Sir Edward Sullivan, 1st Baronet, Lord Chancellor of Ireland. They had seven children.

Parliament of the United Kingdom
Preceded by Charles Ponsonby	Member of Parliament for Dungarvan; 1852–1865	Succeeded by Charles Robert Barry
Preceded by Nicholas Daniel Murphy and Francis Beamish	Member of Parliament for Cork City; 1865 – 1872; With: Nicholas Daniel Murphy	Succeeded by Nicholas Daniel Murphy and Joseph Philip Ronayne
