= 1904 Cork City by-election =

UK Parliamentary by-election

The 1904 Cork City by-election took place in Cork City on 19 August 1904.

It followed the passage of the Land Purchase (Ireland) Act 1903, fought for by Cork MP William O'Brien of the Irish Parliamentary Party. In this he was opposed by his colleagues in the party for having achieved Land Reform before Home Rule. In disgust, O'Brien closed his newspaper the Irish People and resigned his seat on 1 January 1904. Eventually the writ was moved to fill the vacant seat and O'Brien was nominated.

William O'Brien was returned unopposed.
