= 1909 Cork City by-election =

UK Parliamentary by-election

The 1909 Cork City by-election was held on 1 May 1909. The by-election was held due to the resignation of the incumbent Irish Parliamentary MP, William O'Brien. It was won by the All-for-Ireland candidate Maurice Healy.

Crosbie was associated with the United Irish League wing of Irish Nationalism.

By-election 1 May 1909: Cork City
Party	Candidate	Votes	%	±%
Ind. Nationalist	Maurice Healy	4,706	57.02	New
Irish Parliamentary	George Crosbie	3,547	42.98	N/A
Majority		1,159	14.04	N/A
Turnout		8,253	60.66	N/A
Registered electors		13,605		
Ind. Nationalist gain from Irish Parliamentary		Swing	N/A	
