= Joseph Philip Ronayne =

Irish civil engineer and Member of Parliament

Joseph Philip Ronayne (c. 1822 – 7 May 1876) was an Irish civil engineer notable for his role in the development of Irish railways. A member of the Home Rule League, he was a Member of Parliament (MP) for Cork City from 1872 to 1876.

== Career ==
Ronayne, youngest son of Edmond Ronayne, a glass-maker of Cork, was born at Cork in abourt 1822. After an education at Hamblin and Porter's Grammar School in Cork, and instruction from Mr. O'Neill in practical surveying, he entered the office of Sir John Benjamin McNeill, civil engineer of London and Glasgow. He was first engaged in the design and construction of the main arterial lines of railway in Ireland, and then on one half of the Cork and Bandon Railway. In 1853 he proposed furnishing Cork with water by the construction of a lake near Blarney, but this was not carried out. On 4 March 1856 he became a member of the Institution of Civil Engineers.

From 1854 to 1859 he was in California, where he superintended hydraulic works, bringing down the waters of the Sierra Nevada to the goldfields by means of canals and aqueducts. After returning to Ireland he became a contractor, and executed the Queenstown branch of the Cork and Youghal railway. On the completion of that work, he laid out the Cork and Macroom railway. He took payment in shares, and thus occupied the unusual position of engineer, contractor, and the largest proprietor. He subsequently suggested to the government the construction of a dock in a bay near Monkstown, but the Haulbowline site was finally adopted. On 10 December 1872 he was elected in a by-election to represent Cork City in the Parliament of the United Kingdom, after the death of John Francis Maguire. He was re-elected at the 1874 general election and retained the seat until his death.

He died at Rinn Ronain, Queenstown, on 7 May 1876, and was buried in Father Mathew's cemetery, Cork, on 11 May. He married, in 1859, Elizabeth, daughter of Edward Stace Wright, commander R.N.

Parliament of the United Kingdom
Preceded by John Maguire and Nicholas Daniel Murphy	Member of Parliament for Cork City; 1872 – 1876; With: Nicholas Daniel Murphy	Succeeded by William Goulding and Nicholas Daniel Murphy
