= 1916 North Louth by-election =

UK Parliamentary by-election

- 24 February 1916

North Louth (UK Parliament constituency)
	First party	Second party
Candidate	Patrick Whitty	Bernard Hamill
Party	Irish Parliamentary	Healyite Nationalist
Popular vote	2,299	1,810
Percentage	55.9%	44.0%

The 1916 North Louth by-election was held on 24 February 1916. The by-election was held due to the death of the incumbent Irish Parliamentary MP, Augustine Roche. It was won by the Irish Parliamentary candidate Patrick Whitty.

Whitty received some Unionist support, while Hamill received separatist support. Whitty was aged just 21, becoming the youngest MP at the time. He was the nephew of Richard Hazleton, elected MP for the seat in December 1910 but subsequently unseated on petition (although Hazleton continued to sit for North Galway where he had been elected at the same election). Whitty was imposed on the constituency of North Louth by the Party leadership in what was widely ridiculed as an act of nepotism. D.P. Moran's paper the Leader referred to him as "Whitty the Kid" and published a cartoon in which his victory procession included a pram labelled "The Next Candidate".

== Result ==
North Louth by-election, 1916
Party	Candidate	Votes	%	±%
Irish Parliamentary	Patrick Whitty	2,299	55.9	+0.5
Healyite Nationalist	Bernard Hamill	1,810	44.0	N/A
Majority		489	11.9	+1.1
Turnout		4,109	72.1	−5.1
Irish Parliamentary hold		Swing		
