= J. J. Walsh =

Irish politician (1880–1948)

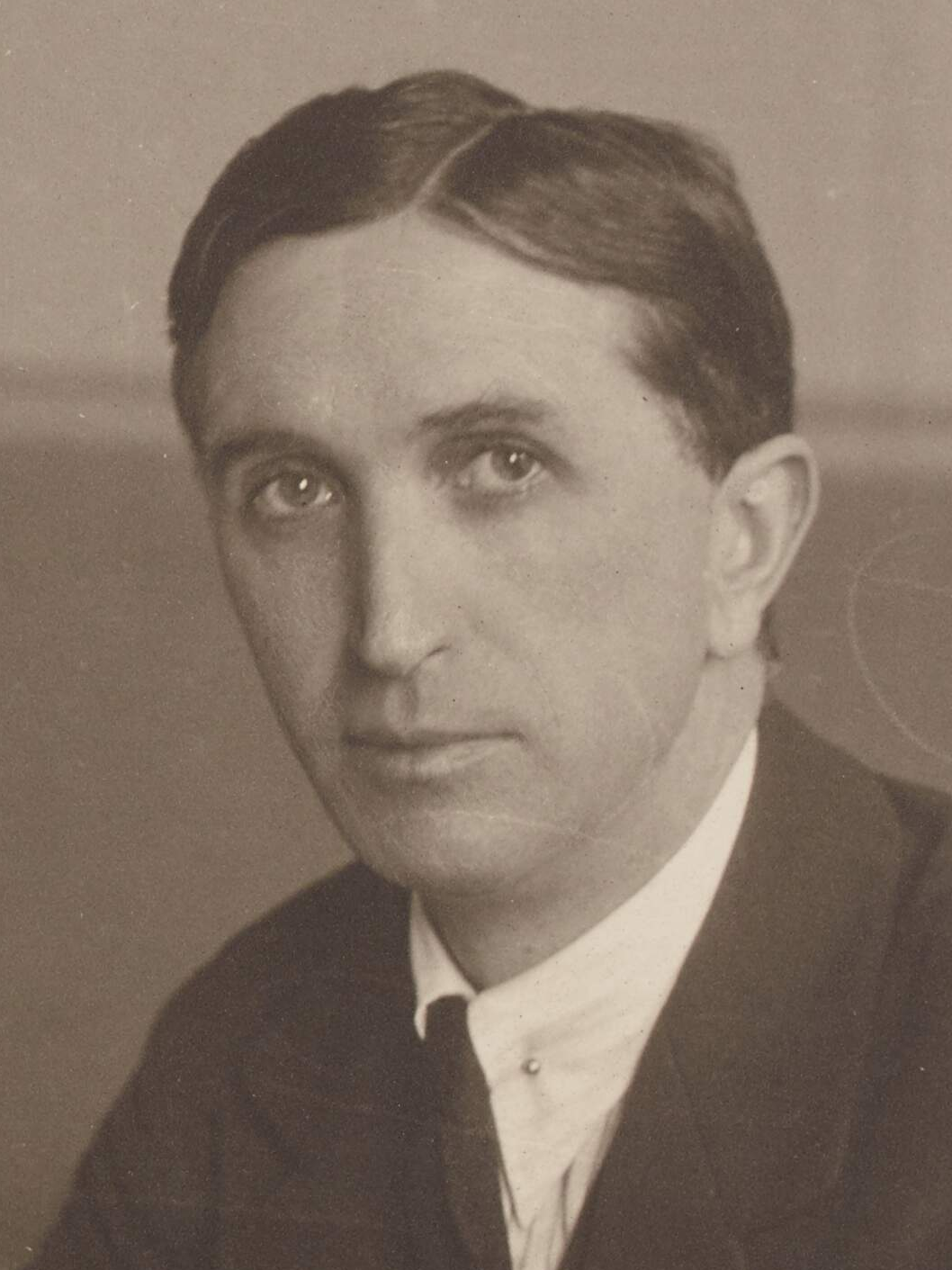
- Walsh, c. 1920s

Minister for Posts and Telegraphs
- In office 2 June 1924 – 12 October 1927
- Preceded by: New office
- Succeeded by: Ernest Blythe

Postmaster General
- In office 1 April 1922 – 2 June 1924
- Preceded by: New office
- Succeeded by: Office abolished

Teachta Dála
- In office May 1921 – September 1927
- Constituency: Cork Borough
- In office December 1918 – May 1921
- Constituency: Cork City

Personal details
- Born: James Joseph Walsh; 20 February 1880 Bandon, County Cork, Ireland
- Died: 3 February 1948 (aged 67) County Cork, Ireland
- Party: Sinn Féin; Cumann na nGaedheal
- Spouse: Jenny Turner
- Military career
- Allegiance: Irish Republic
- Service: Irish Volunteers; Hibernian Rifles
- Service years: 1913–1920
- Rank: Vice-Commandant
- Conflicts: Easter Rising

James Joseph Walsh (20 February 1880 – 3 February 1948) was an Irish politician who served as Postmaster General, (later Minister for Posts and Telegraphs) of the Irish Free State from 1923 to 1927. He was also a senior Gaelic Athletic Association organiser and Cumann na nGaedheal politician. Later, Walsh had heavy connections with fascism, including his association with Ailtirí na hAiséirghe.

== Early years ==
James Joseph Walsh was born in the townland of Rathroon, near Bandon, County Cork. His family came from a farming background, "working a substantial holding of medium but well-cultivated land". Until the age of fifteen, Walsh attended a local school in Bandon, but by his own account "as far as learning went, I may as well have been at home". Together with his school-friend P. S. O'Hegarty, he passed the Civil Service exams for the Postal service. He later worked locally as a clerk in the Post Office. Like O'Hegarty, he spent three years in London at King's College, studying for the Secretary's Office "a syllabus (which) differed little from the Indian Civil Service". While O'Hegarty succeeded in his studies, Walsh did not, and returned to Cork where a friend, Sir Edward Fitzgerald, arranged work for him on the Entertainments Committee of the Cork International Exhibition.

== Sport ==
Walsh was active in the Gaelic Athletic Association, promoting Gaelic games in many areas, but particularly in Cork city and county. His interest in organised sports had a strong political dimension.

I happened to be one of those who realised the potentialities of the G.A.A. as a training ground for Physical Force. Contamination with the alien and all his works was taboo. I gathered around me a force of youthful enthusiasts from the University, Civil Service and Business. With this intensely organised instrument, war was declared on foreign games which were made to feel the shock so heavily that one by one, Soccer and Rugby Clubs began to disappear.

He was also instrumental in establishing the 'revived' Tailteann Games.

He was Chairman of the Cork County Council GAA.

== Politics ==
In 1913, he was one of the founders of the Cork City Irish Volunteers. Because of his activities, he was dismissed from the post office, and served with an order to leave Cork. He moved to Dublin, becoming Vice-Commandant of the Hibernian Rifles in 1915.

He participated in the Easter Rising in 1916 in the GPO. He claimed to have mobilised 20 members of the Hibernian Rifles and took them to the GPO. However Commandant John J. Scollan contradicts this account.

He was arrested following the general surrender and sentenced to death after a court-martial at Richmond Barracks. This was almost immediately commuted to life imprisonment, but he was released the following year under a general amnesty. In later 1917 he was arrested and imprisoned after making a speech declaring "the only way to address John Bull is through the barrel of a rifle". In Autumn 1919 he was involved in a failed assassination attempt on Lord French.

Walsh was elected as a Sinn Féin Member of Parliament (MP) in the 1918 general election for the Cork City constituency. As a member of the 1st Dáil he was arrested for partaking in an illegal government. He was released in 1921 and supported the Anglo-Irish Treaty and went on to become a founding member of the new political party, Cumann na nGaedheal. Walsh served as Postmaster General from 1922 until 1924. In March 1922 the government cut the biannual cost of living bonuses given to post office workers and in September there were further cuts, this led to a strike by the post office workers. Walsh threatened the strikers with dismissals and the government sent in the Army to disrupt pickets and do the work of the strikers. Later that month the strike came to an end. In August 1922 he was part of a government committee which was intended to consider what the Irish Free State's policy towards North-east Ulster would be.

He joined the cabinet of W. T. Cosgrave between 1924 and 1927, after the office was reconstituted as the Department of Posts and Telegraphs. He was elected at every election for the Cork Borough constituency until 1927 when he retired from government. In 1924 he served as the chairman of the Cumann na nGaedheal organising committee and later as the chairman of the organisation in general from 1926 to 1927. Walsh was a supporter of agricultural tariffs and championed the proposals of the Cork Industrial Development Association. In 1927 he resigned from the party and announced that he would not be contesting the election in September. Walsh cited his disagreement with the party's policy on free trade as a reason for his resignation. He wrote that Cumann na nGaedheal "has gone bodily over to the most reactionary elements of the state who will henceforth control its policies".

During World War II, known at the time in Ireland as "the Emergency", Walsh's connections with fascism, including his association with Ailtirí na hAiséirghe, brought him to the attention of the Directorate of Intelligence (G2), the Intelligence branch of the Irish Army. They considered Walsh as a potential "Quisling" in the case of a German invasion of Ireland. Their request to the Minister for Justice, Gerald Boland, to place a tap on Walsh's phone was, however, refused. Walsh took the same tram as the head of the G2, Dan Bryan, who recalls that in 1940, as reports of German military successes were reported in Irish newspapers, Walsh looked up from his newspaper and told him "I see we are still winning". Although his phone was not wiretapped, the telephones in the German embassy were. After the Belfast Blitz began in 1941, he was recorded telling the Germans that they ought to bomb Enniskillen, not Belfast. Walsh was closely associated with Irish-based pro-Nazi initiatives through his association with Ailtirí na hAiséirghe, namely the "Irish Friends of Germany" and the "Young Ireland Association" groups, and also "Cumann Náisiúnta", a pro-Nazi political party. He frequently expressing his views with anti-semitic rhetoric. He was a major financial backer of Ailtirí na hAiséirghe, providing money and offices for the party's newspaper and paying many of their election deposits in the 1944 election.

In 1944 he published a short memoir, 'Recollections of a Rebel'.

On Sunday 24 April 2016 a plaque commemorating J.J. Walsh was unveiled in Kilbrittain.

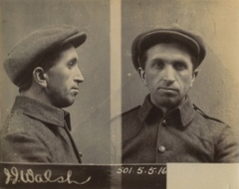
Mugshots of Walsh following his arrest for participation in the 1916 Easter Rising

British Army military intelligence file for James J. Walsh

== Bibliography ==
- Walsh, J.J. : Recollections of a Rebel : The Kerryman Ltd., Tralee : 1944
- O'Mahony, S : Frongoch – University of Revolution: FDR Teoranta, Dublin : 1987
- O'Halpin, Eunan Defending Ireland: The Irish State and Its Enemies Since 1922 : 2000 : ISBN 978-0-19-924269-6

Parliament of the United Kingdom
Preceded by William O'Brien; Maurice Healy	Member of Parliament for Cork City; 1918–1922; With: Liam de Róiste	Constituency abolished
Oireachtas
New constituency	Teachta Dála for Cork City; 1918–1921	Constituency abolished
Political offices
New office	Minister for Posts and Telegraphs; 1922–1927	Succeeded by Ernest Blythe

Dáil	Election	Deputy (Party)	Deputy (Party)	Deputy (Party)	Deputy (Party)	Deputy (Party)
2nd	1921	Liam de Róiste (SF)	Mary MacSwiney (SF)	Donal O'Callaghan (SF)	J. J. Walsh (SF)	4 seats 1921–1923
3rd	1922	Liam de Róiste (PT-SF)	Mary MacSwiney (AT-SF)	Robert Day (Lab)	J. J. Walsh (PT-SF)	4 seats 1921–1923
4th	1923	Richard Beamish (Ind.)	Mary MacSwiney (Rep)	Andrew O'Shaughnessy (Ind.)	J. J. Walsh (CnaG)	Alfred O'Rahilly (CnaG)
4th	1924 by-election	Richard Beamish (Ind.)	Mary MacSwiney (Rep)	Andrew O'Shaughnessy (Ind.)	J. J. Walsh (CnaG)	Michael Egan (CnaG)
5th	1927 (Jun)	John Horgan (NL)	Seán French (FF)	Richard Anthony (Lab)	J. J. Walsh (CnaG)	Barry Egan (CnaG)
6th	1927 (Sep)	W. T. Cosgrave (CnaG)	Seán French (FF)	Richard Anthony (Lab)	Hugo Flinn (FF)	Barry Egan (CnaG)
7th	1932	W. T. Cosgrave (CnaG)	Thomas Dowdall (FF)	Richard Anthony (Ind.)	Hugo Flinn (FF)	William Desmond (CnaG)
8th	1933	W. T. Cosgrave (CnaG)	Thomas Dowdall (FF)	Richard Anthony (Ind.)	Hugo Flinn (FF)	William Desmond (CnaG)
9th	1937	W. T. Cosgrave (FG)	Thomas Dowdall (FF)	Richard Anthony (Ind.)	Hugo Flinn (FF)	4 seats 1937–1948
10th	1938	W. T. Cosgrave (FG)	Thomas Dowdall (FF)	James Hickey (Lab)	Hugo Flinn (FF)	4 seats 1937–1948
11th	1943	W. T. Cosgrave (FG)	Frank Daly (FF)	Richard Anthony (Ind.)	Séamus Fitzgerald (FF)	4 seats 1937–1948
12th	1944	William Dwyer (Ind.)	Frank Daly (FF)	Richard Anthony (Ind.)	Walter Furlong (FF)	4 seats 1937–1948
12th	1946 by-election	Patrick McGrath (FF)	Frank Daly (FF)	Richard Anthony (Ind.)	Walter Furlong (FF)	4 seats 1937–1948
13th	1948	Patrick McGrath (FF)	Michael Sheehan (Ind.)	James Hickey (NLP)	Jack Lynch (FF)	Thomas F. O'Higgins (FG)
14th	1951	Patrick McGrath (FF)	Seán McCarthy (FF)	James Hickey (Lab)	Jack Lynch (FF)	Thomas F. O'Higgins (FG)
14th	1954 by-election	Patrick McGrath (FF)	Seán McCarthy (FF)	James Hickey (Lab)	Jack Lynch (FF)	Stephen Barrett (FG)
15th	1954	Patrick McGrath (FF)	Anthony Barry (FG)	Seán Casey (Lab)	Jack Lynch (FF)	Stephen Barrett (FG)
15th	1956 by-election	John Galvin (FF)	Anthony Barry (FG)	Seán Casey (Lab)	Jack Lynch (FF)	Stephen Barrett (FG)
16th	1957	John Galvin (FF)	Gus Healy (FF)	Seán Casey (Lab)	Jack Lynch (FF)	Stephen Barrett (FG)
17th	1961	John Galvin (FF)	Anthony Barry (FG)	Seán Casey (Lab)	Jack Lynch (FF)	Stephen Barrett (FG)
17th	1964 by-election	Sheila Galvin (FF)	Anthony Barry (FG)	Seán Casey (Lab)	Jack Lynch (FF)	Stephen Barrett (FG)
18th	1965	Gus Healy (FF)	Pearse Wyse (FF)	Seán Casey (Lab)	Jack Lynch (FF)	Stephen Barrett (FG)
18th	1967 by-election	Gus Healy (FF)	Pearse Wyse (FF)	Seán French (FF)	Jack Lynch (FF)	Stephen Barrett (FG)
19th	1969	Constituency abolished. See Cork City North-West and Cork City South-East				
