= Francis Murphy (Irish politician) =

Irish lawyer, scholar and Member of Parliament

Francis Stack Murphy SL (1810? – 1860) was an Irish lawyer, scholar and Member of Parliament.

== Life ==
Born in Cork, Murphy was the son of the merchant Jeremiah Murphy and the nephew of John Murphy, Bishop of Cork. He was educated at Clongowes Wood College and Trinity College, Dublin; he graduated B.A. in 1829 and M.A. in 1832.

He was called to the bar on 25 January 1833 at Lincoln's Inn. In 1834, he became connected with Fraser's Magazine as an occasional contributor, assisting 'Father Prout' in his famous 'Reliques.' He was an excellent classical scholar, and was responsible for some of Mahony's Greek and Latin verses. Mahony introduces him in his 'Prout Papers' as 'Frank Cresswell of Furnival's Inn.'

In 1841, he ran for election as a Member of Parliament for Cork City, which he won and took office on 5 July. He was made a serjeant-at-law in February 1842 and was granted a patent of precedence in 1846. He resigned as an MP in January 1846, but was re-elected again without opposition in 1851 after the resignation of William Trant Fagan. On 1 August 1853, he was made a Commissioner for the Relief of Insolvent Debtors.

He died on 17 June 1860.

Parliament of the United Kingdom
Preceded by Francis Beamish; Daniel Callaghan	Member of Parliament for Cork City; 1841–1846; With: Daniel Callaghan	Succeeded by Alexander McCarthy; Daniel Callaghan
Preceded by William Trant Fagan; James Charles Chatterton	Member of Parliament for Cork City; 1851–1853; With: James Charles Chatterton to 1852; William Trant Fagan from 1852	Succeeded by Francis Beamish; William Trant Fagan
