= 1911 North Louth by-election =

UK Parliamentary by-election

The 1911 North Louth by-election was held on 15 March 1911. The by-election was held due to the election of the incumbent Irish Parliamentary MP, Richard Hazleton being overturned on petition due to corrupt and defamatory conduct. Hazleton had previously ousted the prominent All-for-Ireland League politician Tim Healy in the December 1910 general election. It was won by the former MP and Irish Parliamentary candidate Augustine Roche, who was elected unopposed.
