= Herbert Baldwin (politician) =

Irish politician (1782–1861)

Herbert Baldwin MP

Member of Parliament for Cork City
- In office 10 December 1832 – 6 January 1835
- In office 18 April 1835 – 24 July 1837

Personal details
- Born: 1782 Cork, Ireland
- Died: 1861 (aged 78–79)
- Party: Repeal Association

Dr Herbert Baldwin (1782–1861) was an Irish politician from Cork. He was a Member of Parliament (MP) from 1832 to 1837.

At the 1830 general election, Baldwin stood as a candidate for Cork City, but did not won a seat. The available sources do not record the party affiliation of candidates before 1832, but when Baldwin next stood for Parliament, at the 1832 general election, it was for the newly formed Repeal Association. Seeking to repeal the Act of Union 1800, which had created the United Kingdom of Great Britain and Ireland, the repealers won both seats in Cork City. At the next general election, in January 1835, both Baldwin and his fellow repealer Daniel Callaghan were defeated by Conservative candidates. However, the election was overturned on petition, and in April the seats were awarded to Baldwin and Callaghan.

Baldwin did not contest the 1837 general election.

Parliament of the United Kingdom
Preceded by Daniel Callaghan; John Boyle	Member of Parliament for Cork City; 1832 – January 1835; With: Daniel Callaghan	Succeeded by James Chatterton; Joseph Leycester
Preceded by James Chatterton; Joseph Leycester	Member of Parliament for Cork City; April 1835 – 1837; With: Daniel Callaghan	Succeeded by Francis Beamish; Daniel Callaghan
