= Francis Beamish =

Irish politician

Member of Parliament for Cork City
- In office 20 August 1853 – 12 July 1865 Serving with Nicholas Daniel Murphy (Feb. 1865–Jul. 1865); Francis Lyons (Jun. 1859–Feb. 1865); William Trant Fagan (1853–Jun. 1859)
- Preceded by: Francis Murphy; William Trant Fagan
- Succeeded by: Nicholas Daniel Murphy; John Maguire
- In office 11 August 1837 – 5 July 1841 Serving with Daniel Callaghan
- Preceded by: Herbert Baldwin; Daniel Callaghan
- Succeeded by: Daniel Callaghan; Francis Murphy

Personal details
- Born: 5 April 1802
- Died: 1 February 1868 (aged 65)
- Party: Liberal/Whig

Francis Bernard Beamish (5 April 1802 – 1 February 1868) was an Irish Whig and Liberal politician.

Beamish was the son of William Beamish and Anne Jane Margaret (née Delacour) and, in 1837, married Catherine Savery de Lisle de Courcy, daughter of Michael de Courcy and Catherine de Lisle. They had at least one child: Francis Bernard Servington Beamish, who was born in 1839.

A Freeman of Cork in 1827, Beamish was made Mayor of Cork in 1843, and High Sheriff of the City of Cork in 1852, and was also a Deputy Lieutenant and Justice of the Peace.

Beamish was elected as a Whig Member of Parliament (MP) for Cork City at the 1837 general election and held the seat until 1841, when he did not stand for re-election. He returned to the seat, again as a Whig, at a by-election in 1853—caused by the appointment of Francis Murphy as a Commissioner of Insolvency—and, becoming a Liberal in 1859, held the seat until 1865, when he did not seek re-election.

Parliament of the United Kingdom
Preceded by Herbert Baldwin; Daniel Callaghan	Member of Parliament for Cork City; 1837–1841; With: Daniel Callaghan	Succeeded by Daniel Callaghan; Francis Murphy
Preceded by Francis Murphy; William Trant Fagan	Member of Parliament for Cork City; 1853–1865; With: Nicholas Daniel Murphy (Feb. 1865–Jul. 1865); Francis Lyons (Jun. 1859–Feb. 1865); William Trant Fagan (1853–Jun. 1859)	Succeeded by Nicholas Daniel Murphy; John Maguire
Civic offices
Preceded by Thomas Lyons	Mayor of Cork; 1843	Succeeded by William Trant Fagan
