= 1905 Cork City by-election =

UK Parliamentary by-election

The 1905 Cork City by-election was a parliamentary by-election held for the United Kingdom House of Commons constituency of Cork City on 14 June 1905. The vacancy arose because of the death of the sitting member, J. F. X. O'Brien of the Irish Parliamentary Party. Only one candidate was nominated, Augustine Roche representing the Irish Parliamentary Party, who was elected unopposed.

Cork City by-election, 1905
Party	Candidate	Votes	%	±%
Irish Parliamentary	Augustine Roche	Unopposed	N/A	N/A
Irish Parliamentary hold				
