= 1872 Cork City by-election =

UK Parliamentary by-election

The 1872 Cork City by-election was fought on 6 December 1872. The by-election was fought due to the death of the incumbent MP of the Liberal Party, John Francis Maguire. It was won by the Home Rule candidate Joseph Philip Ronayne.
