= Irish Church Act 1869 =

Act of the Parliament of the United Kingdom

Irish Church Act 1869 (Note: Section 1.)
- Act of Parliament
- Parliament of the United Kingdom
- Long title: An Act to put an end to the Establishment of the Church of Ireland, and to make provision in respect of the Temporalities thereof, and in respect of the Royal College of Maynooth.
- Citation: 32 & 33 Vict. c. 42
- Territorial extent: United Kingdom

Dates
- Royal assent: 26 July 1869
- Commencement: 1 January 1871 (Note: Section 2.)
Other legislation
| Amends | Places of Worship Registration Act 1855 |
| Amended by | Statute Law Revision Act 1963; Statute Law Revision (Northern Ireland) Act 1980 |
| Relates to | Welsh Church Act 1914 |

Status: Amended

Text of statute as originally enacted

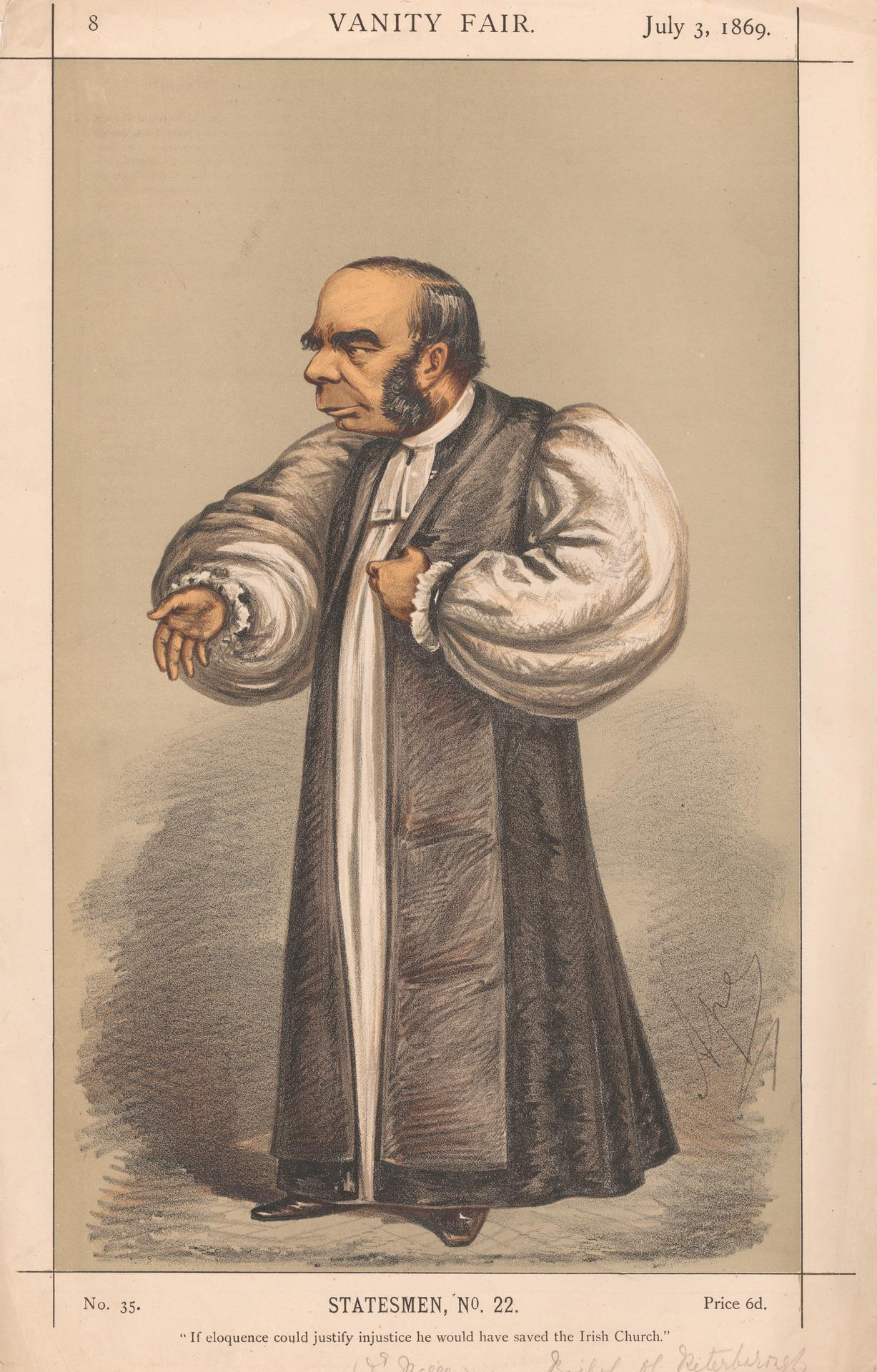
Caricature of opponent of the Act William Connor Magee (Church of England Bishop of Peterborough): "If eloquence could justify injustice he would have saved the Irish Church." (Carlo Pellegrini for Vanity Fair)

The Irish Church Act 1869 (32 & 33 Vict. c. 42) is an act of the Parliament of the United Kingdom which separated the Church of Ireland from the Church of England and disestablished the former, a body that commanded the adherence of a small minority of the population of Ireland (especially outside of Ulster). The act was passed during the first ministry of William Ewart Gladstone and came into force on 1 January 1871. It was strongly opposed by Conservatives in both houses of Parliament.

The act meant the Church of Ireland was no longer entitled to collect tithes from the people of Ireland. It also ceased to send representative bishops as Lords Spiritual to the House of Lords in Westminster. Existing clergy of the church received a life annuity in lieu of the revenues to which they were no longer entitled: tithes, rentcharge, ministers' money, stipends and augmentations, and certain marriage and burial fees.

The passage of the bill through Parliament caused acrimony between the House of Commons and the House of Lords. Queen Victoria personally intervened to mediate. While the Lords extorted from the Commons more compensation to alleviate the disestablished churchmen, in the end, the will of the Commons prevailed.

The act was a key move in dismantling the Protestant Ascendancy which had dominated Ireland for the prior century.

== Development of the Salisbury Convention ==
The modern Salisbury Convention, which holds that the House of Lords should not block bills from the House of Commons in which the government has an election mandate, existed in earlier forms through doctrines developed by the third Marquess of Salisbury over his political career. The question of the establishment of the Church of Ireland was an early case in which the House of Lords refused passage of a bill on the basis that the Commons lacked an election mandate on the issue. In the previous parliament, a bill placing restrictions upon the Church of Ireland failed in the House of Lords, with many Lords arguing that the question should first be put before the public in an election campaign before passage. The Irish Church was a major question of the 1868 election, and following the majority victory of the Liberal Party (which favoured disestablishment) the House of Lords did not block the Irish Church Act 1869.

== Subsequent developments ==
In section 63, the words " or the growing produce thereof " were repealed by section 1 of, and the schedule to, the Statute Law Revision Act 1963, which came into force on 31 July 1963.

== See also ==
- Antidisestablishmentarianism
- Religion in the United Kingdom
- Welsh Church Act 1914

== Bibliography ==
Primary

- Report of Her Majesty's Commission on the revenues and conditions of the Established Church. Parliamentary Papers. Vol. 1867–68 XXIV 3. HMSO. 1868.
- "Irish Church Act 1869 (as enacted)". UK Statute Law Database. 26 July 1869.
- Hansard 1869:
  - Commons vol 194–6: 2nd reading 18 Mar 19 Mar 22 Mar 23 Mar; Committee 15 Apr 16 Apr 19 Apr 22 Apr 23 Apr 26 Apr 29 Apr 3 May 4 May 6 May 7 May; Consideration 13 May; 3rd reading 31 May
  - Lords vol 196–7: 2nd reading 14 Jun 15 Jun 17 Jun 18 Jun; Committee 29 Jun 1 Jul 2 Jul 5 Jul 6 Jul; Report 9 Jul; 3rd reading Jul 12
  - Vol 198 Commons rejects Lords amendments Jul 16 Lords insists 22 Jul Commons accedes 23 Jul
