= Augustine Roche =

Irish politician

Augustine Roche (1849 – 7 December 1915) was an Irish Parliamentary Party politician from Cork. He was a Member of Parliament (MP) from 1905 to 1910, and from 1911 until his death.

== Early life ==
Roche was born Michael Augustine Roche, to Michael Roche of Cork. He was educated privately.

== Career ==
He became head of the firm of A. Roche and Co., wine merchants with premises at 40, King Street (now Mac Curtain Street) Cork. He lived at 73 Douglas Street and was elected to Cork Corporation in 1883 and held the position of Mayor of Cork in 1893 and 1894 and Lord Mayor of Cork in 1904. He was the only person to hold the positions of both Mayor and Lord Mayor of Cork. He was a Justice of the Peace and elected Sheriff of Cork City for 1902. During his year in office as Sheriff, he visited Berlin to present to the Berlin Rowing club a silver cup subscribed for by the citizens of Cork as a recognition of their performance in an international competition held in Cork earlier that year.

== Political career ==
He first stood for election to the United Kingdom House of Commons as a Parnellite candidate at a by-election in June 1895 for Cork City constituency, where William O'Brien MP had resigned his seat. He was narrowly defeated in the by-election by the Anti-Parnellite Irish National Federation candidate J. F. X. O'Brien, and lost again at the general election in July 1895, when both of Cork City's two seats were won by Anti-Parnellites.

After that second defeat, he did not stand again until J. F. X. O'Brien died in May 1905, and at the resulting by-election on 14 June he was returned unopposed for the Irish Parliamentary Party, the two sides having reunited in 1900. He was re-elected unopposed at the 1906 general election. He held the seat again in January 1910, against a strong challenge from the All-for-Ireland League, whose leader William O'Brien took one of the two seats. The League had split its vote in January by fielding three candidates in Cork, but at the next general election, in December 1910, their two candidates took both seats.

However, the winner of the December 1910 election in North Louth, Richard Hazleton, had been unseated after an electoral petition, and Roche was elected unopposed at the resulting by-election on 15 March 1911. He held the seat until his death in December 1915, aged about 66.

Parliament of the United Kingdom
Preceded by William O'Brien; J. F. X. O'Brien	Member of Parliament for Cork City; 1905 – December 1910; With: William O'Brien to 1909; Maurice Healy 1908 – Jan 1910; William O'Brien from Jan 1910	Succeeded by Maurice Healy; William O'Brien
Preceded by Richard Hazleton	Member of Parliament for North Louth; 1911 – 1915	Succeeded by Patrick Whitty
