= Liam de Róiste =

Irish politician (1882–1959)

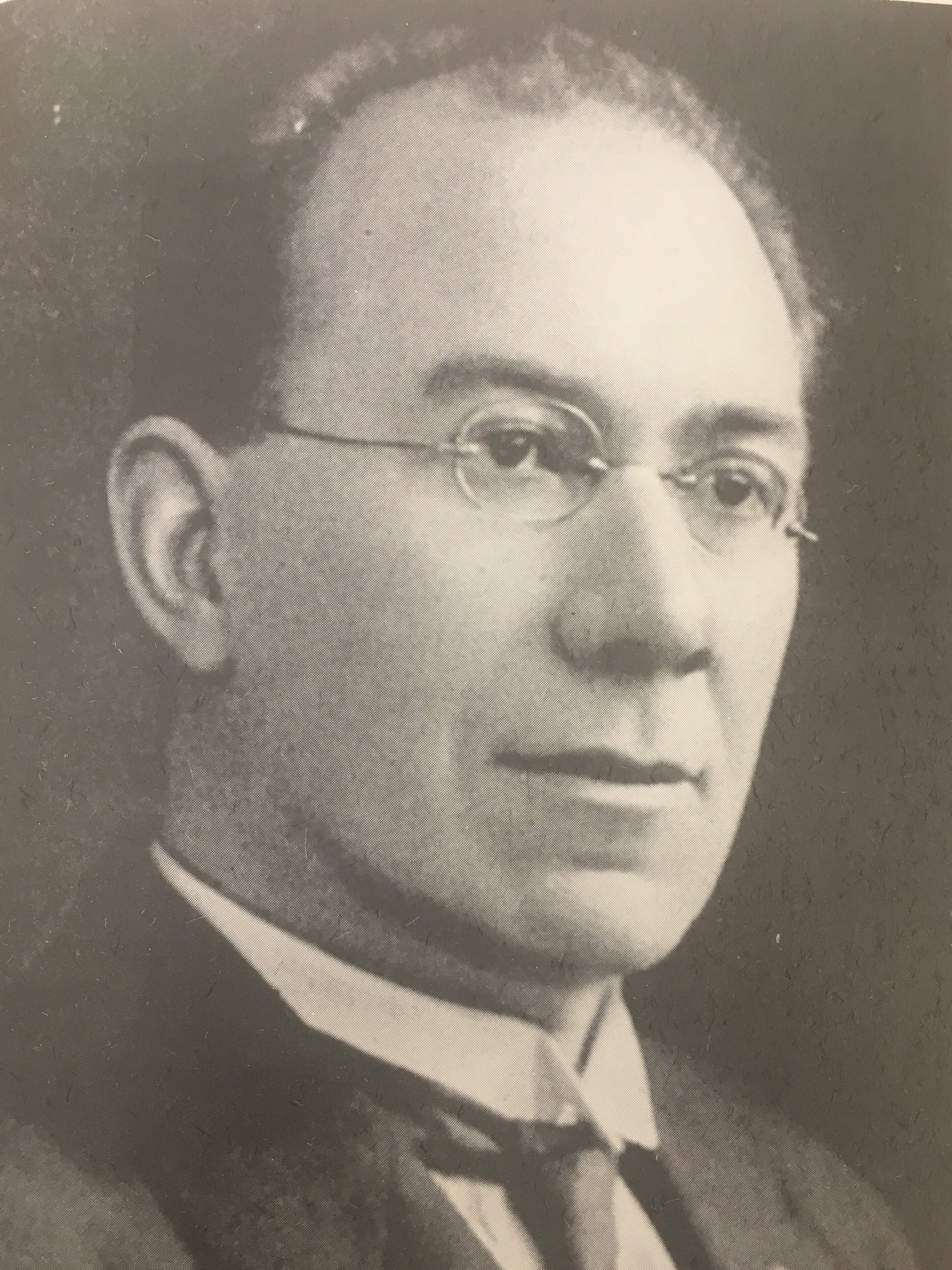
- De Róiste, c.1918

Teachta Dála
- In office June 1922 – August 1923
- Constituency: Cork Borough
- In office December 1918 – May 1921
- Constituency: Cork City

Personal details
- Born: William Roche; 15 June 1882 Fountainstown, County Cork, Ireland
- Died: 15 March 1959 (aged 76) County Cork, Ireland
- Spouse: Nóra Ní Bhriain (m. 1909)

British Army intelligence file for Liam de Róiste

Liam de Róiste (born William Roche; 15 June 1882 – 15 May 1959) was an Irish Sinn Féin politician, diarist and Gaelic scholar.

== Early life ==
He was born in Fountainstown, County Cork, the son of Edward Roche (originally from Tipperary) and Eliza Ahern, who were both primary school teachers.

At the age of 17, he began working in a Cork drapery store. Later, he assumed a teaching post at Skerry's College.

A supporter of the Irish language, which he spoke, he was founder member in 1899 of the Cork branch of the Gaelic League.

== Political activities ==
As vice-chairman of Sinn Féin in Cork, he chaired its first meeting in 1906. A prominent early member of the Irish Volunteers movement, he took part in the march to Macroom on Easter Sunday 1916 and later in helping to smuggle arms for the IRA.

He was elected as a Sinn Féin MP for the Cork City constituency at the 1918 general election. In January 1919, Sinn Féin MPs refused to recognise the Parliament of the United Kingdom and instead assembled at the Mansion House in Dublin as a revolutionary parliament called Dáil Éireann, though de Róiste was unable to attend.

De Róiste opposed the Belfast Boycott stating in a 1920 Dáil debate; "it would mean having to purchase English-made goods instead of Belfast-made articles. Economic penetration was the solution of the Ulster question.

In April 1921, while staying at a neighbour's house for fear of assassination, the family home was stormed by a party of Black and Tans. A personal friend and Catholic priest, James O'Callaghan, evidently mistaken for his host, was shot and killed while investigating the disturbance downstairs. The intruders left unopposed.

De Róiste was re-elected without contest in the 1921 elections for the Cork Borough constituency. He supported the Anglo-Irish Treaty and voted in favour of it. He was re-elected again in the 1922 general election as a member of pro-Treaty Sinn Féin. In the "lead up" to the Irish Civil War, he tried, as part of a group, to reconcile the pro- and anti-Treaty sides, a move that alienated many of his supporters, which effectively ended his political career. He did not stand in the 1923 general election but stood unsuccessfully in the 1925 Seanad election and also unsuccessfully as a Cumann na nGaedheal candidate in the June 1927 general election.

De Róiste was active in local politics in Cork, serving on Cork Corporation from 1920 to 1922. In 1929, he was one of three Cumann na Gael members of the reformed Cork Corporation, losing his seat in the early 1930s.

In 1936–1937, he was involved with the Irish Christian Front, which supported Franco in the Spanish Civil War.

In the following decade, he was one of five councillors for the Cork Civic Party. He retired from politics in 1950.

De Róiste was sympathetic to the fascist and anti-Semitic Ailtirí na hAiséirghe party.

In his private life he was Secretary and Director of the Irish International Trading Corporation, Cork, and an author. He died on 15 May 1959, and is buried at St. Joseph's Cemetery, Ballyphehane, Cork.

Parliament of the United Kingdom
Preceded by Maurice Healy; William O'Brien	Member of Parliament for Cork City; 1918–1922; With: J. J. Walsh	Constituency abolished
Oireachtas
New constituency	Teachta Dála for Cork City; 1918–1921	Constituency abolished

Dáil	Election	Deputy (Party)	Deputy (Party)	Deputy (Party)	Deputy (Party)	Deputy (Party)
2nd	1921	Liam de Róiste (SF)	Mary MacSwiney (SF)	Donal O'Callaghan (SF)	J. J. Walsh (SF)	4 seats 1921–1923
3rd	1922	Liam de Róiste (PT-SF)	Mary MacSwiney (AT-SF)	Robert Day (Lab)	J. J. Walsh (PT-SF)	4 seats 1921–1923
4th	1923	Richard Beamish (Ind.)	Mary MacSwiney (Rep)	Andrew O'Shaughnessy (Ind.)	J. J. Walsh (CnaG)	Alfred O'Rahilly (CnaG)
4th	1924 by-election	Richard Beamish (Ind.)	Mary MacSwiney (Rep)	Andrew O'Shaughnessy (Ind.)	J. J. Walsh (CnaG)	Michael Egan (CnaG)
5th	1927 (Jun)	John Horgan (NL)	Seán French (FF)	Richard Anthony (Lab)	J. J. Walsh (CnaG)	Barry Egan (CnaG)
6th	1927 (Sep)	W. T. Cosgrave (CnaG)	Seán French (FF)	Richard Anthony (Lab)	Hugo Flinn (FF)	Barry Egan (CnaG)
7th	1932	W. T. Cosgrave (CnaG)	Thomas Dowdall (FF)	Richard Anthony (Ind.)	Hugo Flinn (FF)	William Desmond (CnaG)
8th	1933	W. T. Cosgrave (CnaG)	Thomas Dowdall (FF)	Richard Anthony (Ind.)	Hugo Flinn (FF)	William Desmond (CnaG)
9th	1937	W. T. Cosgrave (FG)	Thomas Dowdall (FF)	Richard Anthony (Ind.)	Hugo Flinn (FF)	4 seats 1937–1948
10th	1938	W. T. Cosgrave (FG)	Thomas Dowdall (FF)	James Hickey (Lab)	Hugo Flinn (FF)	4 seats 1937–1948
11th	1943	W. T. Cosgrave (FG)	Frank Daly (FF)	Richard Anthony (Ind.)	Séamus Fitzgerald (FF)	4 seats 1937–1948
12th	1944	William Dwyer (Ind.)	Frank Daly (FF)	Richard Anthony (Ind.)	Walter Furlong (FF)	4 seats 1937–1948
12th	1946 by-election	Patrick McGrath (FF)	Frank Daly (FF)	Richard Anthony (Ind.)	Walter Furlong (FF)	4 seats 1937–1948
13th	1948	Patrick McGrath (FF)	Michael Sheehan (Ind.)	James Hickey (NLP)	Jack Lynch (FF)	Thomas F. O'Higgins (FG)
14th	1951	Patrick McGrath (FF)	Seán McCarthy (FF)	James Hickey (Lab)	Jack Lynch (FF)	Thomas F. O'Higgins (FG)
14th	1954 by-election	Patrick McGrath (FF)	Seán McCarthy (FF)	James Hickey (Lab)	Jack Lynch (FF)	Stephen Barrett (FG)
15th	1954	Patrick McGrath (FF)	Anthony Barry (FG)	Seán Casey (Lab)	Jack Lynch (FF)	Stephen Barrett (FG)
15th	1956 by-election	John Galvin (FF)	Anthony Barry (FG)	Seán Casey (Lab)	Jack Lynch (FF)	Stephen Barrett (FG)
16th	1957	John Galvin (FF)	Gus Healy (FF)	Seán Casey (Lab)	Jack Lynch (FF)	Stephen Barrett (FG)
17th	1961	John Galvin (FF)	Anthony Barry (FG)	Seán Casey (Lab)	Jack Lynch (FF)	Stephen Barrett (FG)
17th	1964 by-election	Sheila Galvin (FF)	Anthony Barry (FG)	Seán Casey (Lab)	Jack Lynch (FF)	Stephen Barrett (FG)
18th	1965	Gus Healy (FF)	Pearse Wyse (FF)	Seán Casey (Lab)	Jack Lynch (FF)	Stephen Barrett (FG)
18th	1967 by-election	Gus Healy (FF)	Pearse Wyse (FF)	Seán French (FF)	Jack Lynch (FF)	Stephen Barrett (FG)
19th	1969	Constituency abolished. See Cork City North-West and Cork City South-East				
