= Patrick Whitty =

Irish politician

Patrick Joseph Whitty (13 May 1894 – 28 July 1967) was, for a brief period, an Irish nationalist politician and MP in the House of Commons of the United Kingdom of Great Britain and Ireland and as member of the Irish Parliamentary Party he represented North Louth from 1916 until 1918. He practised as an accountant.

Whitty was born at 6 Lady Lane in Waterford City in May 1894, the son of Dr. Patrick Joseph Whitty. He was educated at St. Vincent's College, Castleknock, Dublin and trained as an accountant.

On 24 February 1916 he was elected in the Commons by-election as MP for the constituency of North Louth, defeating a Healyite opponent Bernard Hamill by 2,299 votes to 1,810. Whitty received some Unionist support, while Hamill received separatist support. Whitty was aged just 21, becoming the youngest MP at the time. He was the nephew of Richard Hazleton who had been elected MP for the seat in December 1910 but subsequently unseated on petition (although Hazleton continued to sit for North Galway where he had been elected at the same election). Whitty was imposed on the constituency of North Louth by the Party leadership in what was widely ridiculed as an act of nepotism. D.P. Moran's paper the Leader referred to him as "Whitty the Kid" and published a cartoon in which his victory procession included a pram labelled "The Next Candidate".

The constituency was abolished in 1918, and Whitty retired from Parliament at the general election that year. His uncle Richard Hazleton was nominated as the Irish Party candidate in the new Louth constituency.

He died in Birmingham, England on 28 July 1967, the last survivor of the pre-1918 Irish Parliamentary Party.

Parliament of the United Kingdom
Preceded by Augustine Roche	Member of Parliament for North Louth; 1916–1918	Constituency abolished
