= William Trant Fagan =

Irish writer and Member of Parliament (1801-1859)

William Trant Fagan (31 January 1801 – 16 May 1859) was an Irish writer and Member of Parliament (MP) from Cork.

== Family ==
Fagan was the son of James Fagan and his wife Ellen Trust. On 21 June 1827, he married Mary Addis, the daughter of Charles Addis; they had four children, and lived at Feltrim in County Dublin.

== Career ==
At the general election in August 1847 he was elected as one of the two Repeal Association MPs for Cork City. defeating the sitting Repeal MP Alexander McCarthy and taking his seat in the House of Commons of the United Kingdom of Great Britain and Ireland. Later that year, he published "The life and times of Daniel O'Connell", prefacing the book with an address "To The people of Ireland" in which he described O'Connell as "the greatest man that this, or any other country, ever produced".

Fagan resigned from Parliament on 14 April 1851 by appointment as Steward of the Chiltern Hundreds to become a Commissioner of Insolvency. He stood again as an independent Whig at the general election in July 1852, pledged to support to the formation of an Independent Irish Opposition. He was re-elected in 1857 and at the general election on 6 May 1859, but died ten days later, aged 57.

In 1844 Fagan was elected Mayor of Cork and as an Alderman a Justice of the Peace (JP) for County Cork, and was also a Deputy Lieutenant.

Parliament of the United Kingdom
Preceded by Alexander McCarthy; Daniel Callaghan	Member of Parliament for Cork City; 1847 – 1851; With: Daniel Callaghan to 1849; James Chatterton from 1849	Succeeded by Francis Murphy; James Chatterton
Preceded by James Chatterton; Francis Murphy	Member of Parliament for Cork City; 1852 – 1859; With: Francis Murphy; Francis Beamish	Succeeded by Francis Lyons; Francis Beamish
