= North Louth =

Former parliamentary constituency in the United Kingdom

- Former county constituency for the House of Commons

1885–1918
- Seats: 1
- Created from: Dundalk and Louth
- Replaced by: Louth

North Louth was a parliamentary constituency in Ireland, which returned one Member of Parliament (MP) to the House of Commons of the Parliament of the United Kingdom, elected on a system of first-past-the-post, from 1885 to 1918. Prior to the 1885 general election and after the dissolution of Parliament in 1918 the area was part of the Louth constituency.

== Boundaries ==
This constituency comprised the northern part of County Louth. The seat was defined under the Redistribution of Seats Act 1885 as comprising the baronies of Louth, Lower Dundalk and Upper Dundalk, and that part of the barony of Ardee contained within the parishes of Killany and Louth.

== Members of Parliament ==
Election	Member	Party
1885	Joseph Nolan	Irish Parliamentary Party
1891	Joseph Nolan	Parnellite
1892	Tim Healy	Irish National Federation
1900	Tim Healy	Healyite Nationalist
January 1910	Tim Healy	All-for-Ireland League
December 1910	Richard Hazleton	Irish Parliamentary Party
1911 by-election	Augustine Roche	Irish Parliamentary Party
1916 by-election	Patrick J. Whitty	Irish Parliamentary Party
1918	constituency abolished: see County Louth	

== Elections ==
=== Elections in the 1880s ===
1885 general election: North Louth
Party	Candidate	Votes	%	±%
Irish Parliamentary	Joseph Nolan	2,581	64.0	
Ind. Nationalist	Philip Callan	1,451	36.0	
Majority		1,130	28.0	
Turnout		4,032	67.9	
Registered electors		5,935		
Irish Parliamentary win (new seat)				

1886 general election: North Louth
Party	Candidate	Votes	%	±%
Irish Parliamentary	Joseph Nolan	Unopposed		
Registered electors		5,935		
Irish Parliamentary hold				

=== Elections in the 1890s ===
1892 general election: North Louth
Party	Candidate	Votes	%	±%
Irish National Federation	Tim Healy	2,268	59.1	N/A
Ind. Nationalist	Philip Callan	1,569	40.9	New
Majority		699	18.2	N/A
Turnout		3,837	69.3	N/A
Registered electors		5,534		
Irish National Federation gain from Irish Parliamentary		Swing	N/A	

1895 general election: North Louth
Party	Candidate	Votes	%	±%
Irish National Federation	Tim Healy	2,294	61.6	+2.5
Irish National League	Joseph Nolan	1,433	38.4	New
Majority		861	23.2	+5.0
Turnout		3,727	65.5	−3.8
Registered electors		5,686		
Irish National Federation hold		Swing		

=== Elections in the 1900s ===
1900 general election: North Louth
Party	Candidate	Votes	%	±%
Healyite Nationalist	Tim Healy	1,604	55.5	−6.1
Irish Parliamentary	Edmund Haviland-Burke	1,285	44.5	N/A
Majority		319	11.0	N/A
Turnout		2,889	49.2	−16.3
Registered electors		5,869		
Healyite Nationalist gain from Irish National Federation		Swing		

1906 general election: North Louth
Party	Candidate	Votes	%	±%
Healyite Nationalist	Tim Healy	Unopposed		
Registered electors		5,820		
Healyite Nationalist hold				

=== Elections in the 1910s ===
January 1910 general election: North Louth
Party	Candidate	Votes	%	±%
All-for-Ireland	Tim Healy	2,432	51.0	N/A
Irish Parliamentary	Richard Hazleton	2,333	49.0	New
Majority		99	2.0	N/A
Turnout		4,765	81.2	N/A
Registered electors		5,868		
All-for-Ireland gain from Healyite Nationalist		Swing	N/A	

December 1910 general election: North Louth
Party	Candidate	Votes	%	±%
Irish Parliamentary	Richard Hazleton	2,509	55.4	+6.4
All-for-Ireland	Tim Healy	2,021	44.6	−6.4
Majority		488	10.8	N/A
Turnout		4,530	77.2	−4.0
Registered electors		5,868		
Irish Parliamentary gain from All-for-Ireland		Swing	+6.4	

The general election result was overturned by petition.

By-election, 1911: North Louth
Party	Candidate	Votes	%	±%
Irish Parliamentary	Augustine Roche	Unopposed		
Registered electors		5,745		
Irish Parliamentary hold				

Roche's death prompts a by-election.

By-election, 1916: North Louth
Party	Candidate	Votes	%	±%
Irish Parliamentary	Patrick Joseph Whitty	2,299	55.9	+0.5
Ind. Nationalist	Bernard Hamill	1,810	44.0	N/A
Majority		489	11.9	+1.1
Turnout		4,109	72.1	−5.1
Registered electors		5,697		
Irish Parliamentary hold		Swing		
