= 1914 Cork City by-election =

UK Parliamentary by-election

The 1914 Cork City by-election was held on 18 February 1914. The by-election was held due to the incumbent All-for-Ireland MP, William O'Brien resigning the seat in order to recontest it. O'Brien won it unopposed.
