= 1876 Cork City by-election =

UK Parliamentary by-election

A 1876 by-election was held in the UK House of Commons constituency of Cork City on 25 May 1876 due to the death of Joseph Philip Ronayne, one of the two incumbent Home Rule League MPs, on 7 May 1876. It was won by the Conservative candidate William Goulding because the Home Rule vote was split between two candidates. It was the last time that a parliamentary election for Cork City was won by a Conservative or Unionist.

Cork City by-election, 1876
Party	Candidate	Votes	%	±%
Conservative	William Goulding	1,279	38.90	+2.9
Home Rule	John Daly	1,168	35.52	
Home Rule	Denny Lane	841	25.58	
Majority		111	3.38	N/A
Turnout		3,288	74.71	−3.7
Registered electors		4,401		
Conservative gain from Home Rule		Swing		
