= Cork City (UK Parliament constituency) =

UK parliamentary constituency in Ireland, 1801–1922

- Former borough constituency for the House of Commons
- County: County Cork
- Borough: Cork

1801–1922
- Seats: 2
- Created from: Cork City (IHC)
- Replaced by: Cork (Dáil)

Cork City was a parliamentary constituency in Ireland, represented in the Parliament of the United Kingdom. From 1801 to 1922 it returned two members of parliament (MPs) to the House of Commons of the United Kingdom of Great Britain and Ireland.

== History ==
Cork City was the only constituency in Ireland to return the same number of MPs in each general election from the Acts of Union in 1801 until the establishment of the Irish Free State in 1922. At the 1918 general election, Sinn Féin used it as the basis of membership of the First Dáil.

Under the Government of Ireland Act 1920, the area was defined as a 4-seat constituency for the Southern Ireland House of Commons and a single-seat constituency at Westminster. At the 1921 Southern Ireland House of Commons election, the four seats were won uncontested by Sinn Féin, who treated it as part of the election to the Second Dáil. Both MPs elected in 1918, J. J. Walsh and Liam de Róiste, were among the four elected in 1921. It was never used as a Westminster constituency; under s. 1(4) of the Irish Free State (Agreement) Act 1922, no writ was to be issued "for a constituency in Ireland other than a constituency in Northern Ireland". Therefore, after the House of Commons was dissolved on 26 October 1922, no vote was held in Cork City at the 1922 United Kingdom general election on 15 November 1922, shortly before the Irish Free State left the United Kingdom on 6 December 1922.

== Boundaries ==
This constituency comprised the whole of the County of the City of Cork. The County of the City of Cork corresponds to the barony of Cork. Cork had the status of a county of itself, although it remained connected with County Cork for certain purposes.

The boundary commissioners indicated in their report of December 1831 that they were not authorised to propose any narrower limit than the boundary of the county of the city. It was defined by the Parliamentary Boundaries (Ireland) Act 1832 as: "The County of the City of Cork".

A Topographical Directory of Ireland, published in 1837, describes the area covered.

The county of the city comprises a populous rural district of great beauty and fertility, watered by several small rivulets and intersected by the river Lee and its noble estuary: it is bounded on the north by the barony of Fermoy, on the east by that of Barrymore, on the south by Kerricurrihy, and on the west by Muskerry: it comprehends the parishes of St. Finbarr, Christ-Church or the Holy Trinity, St. Peter, St. Mary Shandon, St. Anne Shandon, St. Paul and St. Nicholas, all, except part of St. Finbarr's, within the city and suburbs, and those of Curricuppane, Carrigrohanemore, Kilcully, and Rathcoony, together with parts of the parishes of Killanully or Killingly, Carrigaline, Dunbullogue or Carrignavar, Ballinaboy, Inniskenny, Kilnaglory, White-church, and Templemichael, without those limits; and contains, according to the Ordnance survey, an area of 44,463 statute acres, of which, 2396 are occupied by the city and suburbs.

The Directory also has a passage on the representative history. Other, more modern, sources ascribe an earlier date to the start of the parliamentary representation of Cork; but the passage is useful for information about the position in the 19th century.

The city first sent members to the Irish parliament in 1374, but representatives who appear to have served in London were chosen previously. The right of election was vested in the freemen of the city, and in the 40s. freeholders and £50 leaseholders of the county of the city, of whom the freemen, in 1831, amounted in number to 2331, and the freeholders to 1545, making a total of 3876; but by the act of the 2nd of Wm. IV., cap. 88 (under which the city, from its distinguished importance, retains its privilege of returning two representatives to the Imperial parliament, and the limits of the franchise, comprising the entire county of the city, remain unaltered), the non-resident freemen, except within seven miles, have been disfranchised, and the privilege of voting at elections has been extended to the £10 householders, and the £20 and £10 leaseholders for the respective terms of 14 and 20 years. The number of voters registered up to Jan. 2nd, 1836, amounted to 4791, of whom 1065 were freemen; 2727 £10 householders; 105 £50, 152 £20, and 608 forty-shilling freeholders; 3 £50, 7 £20, and 2 £10 rent-chargers; and 1 £50, 26 £20, and 95 £10 leaseholders: the sheriffs are the returning officers.

Under the Representation of the People (Ireland) Act 1868, its boundaries were defined to include all of the municipal borough of Cork. These had been defined in the Municipal Corporations (Ireland) Act 1840 as:

From the Point where Silver Stream Lane meets the Dublin Road, Northward, along the said Lane, to the Upper Glanmire Road; thence in a straight Line and North Direction to the Spring and Stream that flows into the Glen River; thence follow the Stream to the River; thence, West, along the River Glen to the Eastern Wall of Callaghan’s Distillery; thence, Northward, along the said Wall to Spring Lane; thence, East, along Spring Lane to Ballyvo Road; thence in a straight Line and Westerly Direction to the Junction of the Mallow and old Dublin Roads; thence in a straight Line and Westerly Direction to the Junction of Fairfield Lane and Brocklesbury Street; thence in a straight Line and Southerly Direction to the West End of Water Lane; thence to a Point in Fair Lane Five hundred Yards to the North of the Junction of the said Lane with Corbett's Lane; thence to a Point on the Granagher Road Four hundred Yards from its Junction with Blarney Road; thence in a straight Line to a Junction of the Lane (near Skilla Lane) leading to the City Gaol with the Blarney Road; thence along the Lane leading to the City Gaol to the South-west Corner of the surrounding Wall of the said Gaol; thence in a straight Line to a Point on the Sunday Well Road Three hundred Yards to the East of Wellington Bridge;thence in a straight Line to a Point on the Mardyke Walk Seven hundred Yards to the East of the Lane leading from Wellington Bridge to the said Mardyke Walk; thence in a straight Line to the Road leading to the County Gaol; thence along the said Road to the North-east Corner of the surrounding Wall of the said County Gaol; thence along the said North-east Wall to the Northern Macroom and Bandon Road; thence in a straight Line to a Point on the Bandon Road One hundred and twenty Yards West of the Junction of the said Road with the Southern Macroom and Bandon Road; thence in a straight Line to a Point on the Kinsale Road Three hundred and seventy Yards from the Junction of Lough Lane with the Bandon Road, and measured along the Middle of Lough Lane and the Kinsale Road; thence in a straight Line to the Junction of Poula Duff Road with Gallows Green; thence in a straight Line and South-east Direction to the Point where the New Burying Ground Lane meets Friar's Walk; thence along the New Burying Ground Lane to the Curragh Road; thence in a North-east Direction along the Curragh Road to Evergreen Road; thence in a straight Line and North-east Direction to a Point on the Passage Road where a Lane leads from the said Road to the Junction of the Black Rock Road with Boreen Managh Lane; thence along the said Lane to the Point of Junction of the said Black Rock Road and Boreen Managh Lane; thence, East, along the said Black Rock Road to Lucy Ville Lane; thence in a straight Line to the nearest Point of the surrounding Wall of the City Gas Works; thence along the Eastern Wall of the said Gas Works to the nearest Point of the River; thence, Eastward, along the High-water Mark to the Point nearest the Old Castle; thence across the River to the first-named Point.

== Members of Parliament ==
Date	First member	First party	Second member	Second party
1801, 1 January	Hon. John Hely-Hutchinson (Note: Elevated to the peerage as the 1st Baron Hutchinson, 1801)	Whig	Mountifort Longfield	Tory
1802, 8 January	Hon. Christopher Hely-Hutchinson	Whig	Mountifort Longfield	Tory
1812, 5 November	Sir Nicholas Colthurst, Bt (Note: Died in office, 1829)	Tory	Mountifort Longfield	Tory
1818, 13 July	Sir Nicholas Colthurst, Bt	Tory	Hon. Christopher Hely-Hutchinson (Note: Died in office, 1826)	Whig
1826, 29 December	Sir Nicholas Colthurst, Bt	Tory	John Hely-Hutchinson	Whig
1829, 9 July	Gerrard Callaghan (Note: Election declared void)	Tory	John Hely-Hutchinson	Whig
1830, 29 March	Daniel Callaghan	Whig	John Hely-Hutchinson	Whig
1830, 11 August	Daniel Callaghan	Whig	Hon. John Boyle	Whig
1831, 7 May	Daniel Callaghan	Repeal Association	Hon. John Boyle	Whig
1832, 21 December	Daniel Callaghan	Repeal Association	Dr. Herbert Baldwin	Repeal Association
1835, 17 January	Joseph Leycester	Conservative	James Charles Chatterton	Conservative
1835, 18 April	Daniel Callaghan (Note: Seated on petition. Joint candidate of the Whig Party and Repeal Association in 1835 and 1837. Died in office, 1849.)	Repeal Association	Dr. Herbert Baldwin (Note: Seated on petition. Joint candidate of the Whig Party and Repeal Association in 1835.)	Repeal Association
1837, 11 August	Daniel Callaghan	Repeal Association	Francis Beamish (Note: Joint candidate of the Whig Party and Repeal Association in 1837.)	Repeal Association
1841, 5 July	Daniel Callaghan	Repeal Association	Francis Murphy (Note: Resigned)	Whig
1846, 31 January	Daniel Callaghan	Repeal Association	Alexander McCarthy	Repeal Association
1847, 9 August	Daniel Callaghan	Repeal Association	William Trant Fagan (Note: Resigned, 1851)	Repeal Association
1849, 4 November	James Charles Chatterton	Conservative	William Trant Fagan	Repeal Association
1851, 23 April	James Charles Chatterton	Conservative	Francis Murphy	Whig
1852, 14 July	William Trant Fagan	Ind. Irish	Francis Murphy	Ind. Irish
1853, 20 August	William Trant Fagan	Ind. Irish	Francis Beamish	Whig
1857, 28 March	William Trant Fagan	Whig	Francis Beamish	Whig
1859, 6 June	William Trant Fagan	Liberal	Francis Beamish	Liberal
1859, 29 June	Francis Lyons (Note: Resigned, 1865)	Liberal	Francis Beamish	Liberal
1865, 14 February	Nicholas Daniel Murphy (Note: Re-elected as a Liberal at the 1865 and 1868 general elections. Returned as a Home Ruler at the 1874 election.)	Liberal	Francis Beamish	Liberal
1865, 12 July	Nicholas Daniel Murphy	Liberal	John Maguire (Note: Died in office, 1872)	Liberal
1872, 10 December	Nicholas Daniel Murphy	Liberal	Joseph Philip Ronayne (Note: Died in office, 1876)	Home Rule League
1874, 6 February	Nicholas Daniel Murphy	Home Rule League	Joseph Philip Ronayne	Home Rule League
1876, 25 May	Nicholas Daniel Murphy	Home Rule League	William Goulding	Conservative
1880, 5 April	John Daly (Note: A member of the Parnellite faction of the Home Rule League in 1880. Resigned as MP, 1884.)	Home Rule League	Charles Stewart Parnell (Note: Leader of the Parnellite faction of the Home Rule League. Re-elected as an Irish Parliamentary Party candidate in 1885 and 1886, he led the Parnellite Nationalists after the split in 1890 until he died in office in 1891.)	Home Rule League
1882	John Daly	Irish Parliamentary	Charles Stewart Parnell	Irish Parliamentary
1884, 23 February	John Deasy	Irish Parliamentary	Charles Stewart Parnell	Irish Parliamentary
1885, 27 November	Maurice Healy	Irish Parliamentary	Charles Stewart Parnell	Irish Parliamentary
1891, 6 November	Maurice Healy	Irish National Federation	Martin Flavin	Irish National Federation
1892, 6 July	Maurice Healy	Irish National Federation	William O'Brien	Irish National Federation
1895, 27 June	Maurice Healy	Irish National Federation	J. F. X. O'Brien	Irish National Federation
1900, 4 October	William O'Brien	Irish Parliamentary	J. F. X. O'Brien	Irish Parliamentary
1904, 1 January	vacant		J. F. X. O'Brien	Irish Parliamentary
1904, 19 August	William O'Brien	Irish Parliamentary	J. F. X. O'Brien	Irish Parliamentary
1905, 14 June	William O'Brien	Irish Parliamentary	Augustine Roche	Irish Parliamentary
1909, 1 May	Maurice Healy	Independent Nationalist	Augustine Roche	Irish Parliamentary
1910, 18 January (Note: At the January 1910 general election, O'Brien was elected for both Cork City and North East Cork. He chose to sit for Cork City.)	William O'Brien	All-for-Ireland League	Augustine Roche	Irish Parliamentary
1910, 6 December	William O'Brien	All-for-Ireland League	Maurice Healy	All-for-Ireland League
1914, 18 February (Note: William O'Brien had been elected as an All-for-Ireland League candidate, but resigned his seat on 19 January 1914, and stood for re-election as an independent nationalist. He was returned unopposed.)	William O'Brien	Independent Nationalist	Maurice Healy	All-for-Ireland League
1918, December	J. J. Walsh	Sinn Féin	Liam de Róiste	Sinn Féin
1922	constituency abolished			

== Elections ==
Candidates referred to as Non Partisan, did not have a party allegiance specified in either Stooks Smith or Walker (see reference section below for the sources) or capable of being inferred by disaggregating different groups incorporated under one label by Walker (such as Whigs before 1859 being listed as Liberals).

In multi-member elections, a change in vote percentage is only calculated for individual candidates not for parties. No attempt is made to compare changes between single member by-elections and previous or subsequent multi-member elections.

Turnouts, in multi-member elections from 1832, are calculated on the basis of the number of electors Stooks Smith records as voting. In some cases estimated turnouts are obtained by dividing the ballots cast by two, to obtain the lowest possible turnout figure. To the extent that electors did not use both their votes, the estimate will be less than the actual turnout.

1910s – 1900s – 1890s – 1880s – 1870s – 1860s – 1850s – 1840s – 1830s – 1820s – 1810s – 1800s

=== Elections of the 1910s ===
- The constituency ceased to be represented in the United Kingdom Parliament, upon the dissolution of the House of Commons, in 1922. This was over a month before the Irish Free State came into existence.

General Election 14 December 1918: Cork City (2 seats)
Party	Candidate	Votes	%	±%
Sinn Féin	J. J. Walsh	20,801	34.3	New
Sinn Féin	Liam de Róiste	20,506	33.8	New
Irish Parliamentary	Maurice Talbot-Crosbie	7,480	12.3	−11.3
Irish Parliamentary	Richard O'Sullivan	7,162	11.8	−11.8
Irish Unionist	Daniel Williams	2,519	4.2	New
Irish Unionist	Thomas Farrington	2,254	3.7	New
Turnout		60,772	67.4 (est.)	−5.6
Registered electors				
Sinn Féin gain from Irish Parliamentary		Swing		
Sinn Féin gain from Irish Parliamentary		Swing		

- The count took place on 28 December 1918, to allow time for postal votes from the armed forces to arrive. The Sinn Féin MPs did not take their seats at Westminster.

By-election 18 February 1914: Cork City
Party	Candidate	Votes	%	±%
All-for-Ireland	William O'Brien	Unopposed		
Registered electors		12,923		
All-for-Ireland hold				

December 1910 general election: Cork City (2 seats)
Party	Candidate	Votes	%	±%
All-for-Ireland	William O'Brien	5,384	26.7	+2.9
All-for-Ireland	Maurice Healy	5,269	26.2	+4.0
Irish Parliamentary	Willie Redmond	4,746	23.6	+3.8
Irish Parliamentary	Augustine Roche	4,743	23.6	+0.3
Turnout		20,142	73.0 (est.)	+4.0
Registered electors		13,797		
All-for-Ireland hold		Swing		
All-for-Ireland gain from Irish Parliamentary		Swing		

- Redmond and Roche were associated with the United Irish League wing of Irish Nationalism.
- William O'Brien resigned again for a fourth time in January 1914 and re-stood to test local support for his policies, after the All-for-Ireland League suffered heavy defeats in the Cork City municipal elections.

General election 18 January 1910: Cork City (2 seats)
Party	Candidate	Votes	%	±%
All-for-Ireland	William O'Brien	4,535	23.8	N/A
Irish Parliamentary	Augustine Roche	4,438	23.3	N/A
All-for-Ireland	Maurice Healy	4,229	22.2	N/A
Irish Parliamentary	William Murphy	3,776	19.8	N/A
Ind. Nationalist	Sir Edward Fitzgerald, 1st Baronet	2,061	10.8	N/A
Turnout		19,039	69.0 (est.)	N/A
Registered electors		13,797		
All-for-Ireland gain from Irish Parliamentary		Swing	N/A	
Irish Parliamentary hold		Swing	N/A	

- Roche and Murphy were associated with the United Irish League wing of Irish Nationalism.

=== Elections of the 1900s ===
- Cosbie was associated with the United Irish League wing of Irish Nationalism

By-Election 1 May 1909: Cork City
Party	Candidate	Votes	%	±%
Ind. Nationalist	Maurice Healy	4,706	57.02	New
Irish Parliamentary	George Crosbie	3,547	42.98	N/A
Majority		1,159	14.04	N/A
Turnout		8,253	60.66	N/A
Registered electors		13,605		
Ind. Nationalist gain from Irish Parliamentary		Swing	N/A	

- William O'Brien resigned for a third time in 1909.

General election 13 January 1906: Cork City (2 seats)
Party	Candidate	Votes	%	±%
Irish Parliamentary	William O'Brien	Unopposed		
Irish Parliamentary	Augustine Roche	Unopposed		
Registered electors		13,285		
Irish Parliamentary hold				
Irish Parliamentary hold				

By-election 14 June 1905: Cork City
Party	Candidate	Votes	%	±%
Irish Parliamentary	Augustine Roche	Unopposed		
Irish Parliamentary hold				

- William O'Brien was elected "without his knowledge and against his consent".
- Death of J. F. X. O'Brien, in 1905.

By-election 19 August 1904: Cork City
Party	Candidate	Votes	%	±%
Irish Parliamentary	William O'Brien	Unopposed		
Irish Parliamentary hold				
Registered electors		13,103		

- William O'Brien resigned again in January 1904.

General election 4 October 1900: Cork City (2 seats)
Party	Candidate	Votes	%	±%
Irish Parliamentary	William O'Brien	5,812	37.4	N/A
Irish Parliamentary	J. F. X. O'Brien	5,513	35.5	+9.5
Healyite Nationalist	Jeremiah Blake	2,235	14.4	−8.0
Healyite Nationalist	Maurice Healy	1,985	12.8	−12.5
Majority		3,278	21.1	−0.9
Turnout		15,545	59.1 (est.)	−17.5
Registered electors		13,153		
Irish Parliamentary hold				
Irish Parliamentary hold				

- The Irish National Federation, the Irish National League and William O'Brien's United Irish League joined forces, to re-create the Irish Parliamentary Party (IPP), in 1900. Healy contested the 1900 general election as an Independent Nationalist, after forming a Healyite faction, outside the IPP.

=== Elections of the 1890s ===
General election 16 July 1895: Cork City (2 seats)
Party	Candidate	Votes	%	±%
Irish National Federation	J. F. X. O'Brien	5,327	26.0	−6.4
Irish National Federation	Maurice Healy	5,169	25.3	−3.9
Irish National League	Augustine Roche	4,994	24.4	+4.8
Irish National League	Jeremiah Blake	4,966	24.3	+5.4
Majority		175	0.9	−8.7
Turnout		20,456	76.6 (est.)	−2.7
Registered electors		13,362		
Irish National Federation hold		Swing	−5.6	
Irish National Federation hold		Swing	−4.4	

By-Election 27 June 1895: Cork City
Party	Candidate	Votes	%	±%
Irish National Federation	J. F. X. O'Brien	4,309	51.1	−10.5
Irish National League	Augustine Roche	4,132	49.0	+10.5
Majority		177	2.1	−7.5
Turnout		8,441	63.2	−16.1
Registered electors		13,362		
Irish National Federation hold		Swing	−10.5	

- Resignation of William O'Brien

General election 6 July 1892: Cork City (2 seats)
Party	Candidate	Votes	%	±%
Irish National Federation	William O'Brien	5,273	32.4	N/A
Irish National Federation	Maurice Healy	4,759	29.2	N/A
Irish National League	Willie Redmond	3,186	19.6	N/A
Irish National League	Daniel Horgan	3,077	18.9	N/A
Majority		1,573	9.6	N/A
Turnout		16,295	79.3 (est.)	N/A
Registered electors		10,276		
Irish National Federation gain from Irish Parliamentary		Swing	N/A	
Irish National Federation gain from Irish Parliamentary		Swing	N/A	

By-Election 6 November 1891: Cork City
Party	Candidate	Votes	%	±%
Irish National Federation	Martin Flavin	3,669	52.51	N/A
Irish National League	John Redmond	2,157	30.87	N/A
Irish Unionist	Dominick Sarsfield	1,161	16.62	New
Majority		1,512	21.64	N/A
Turnout		6,987	68.0	N/A
Registered electors		10,276		
Irish National Federation gain from Irish Parliamentary		Swing	N/A	

- The Irish Parliamentary Party split in December 1890. Parnell led the Irish National League, Parnellite Nationalist group. Most of the IPP MPs (including Healy) set up the Irish National Federation as the Anti-Parnellite Nationalist organisation.
- Parnell died in office.

=== Elections of the 1880s ===
General election 2 July 1886: Cork City (2 seats)
Party	Candidate	Votes	%	±%
Irish Parliamentary	Charles Stewart Parnell	Unopposed		
Irish Parliamentary	Maurice Healy	Unopposed		
Registered electors		14,569		
Irish Parliamentary hold				
Irish Parliamentary hold				

General election 27 November 1885: Cork City (2 seats)
Party	Candidate	Votes	%	±%
Irish Parliamentary	Charles Stewart Parnell	6,716	41.7	+15.6
Irish Parliamentary	Maurice Healy	6,536	40.6	+7.2
Irish Conservative	Joseph Pike	1,464	9.1	−14.1
Irish Conservative	John Hugh Bainbridge	1,401	8.7	N/A
Majority		5,072	31.5	+25.7
Turnout		8,059 (est)	55.3 (est.)	−6.3 (est)
Registered electors		14,569		
Irish Parliamentary hold		Swing	+11.3	
Irish Parliamentary hold		Swing	+7.2	

By-Election 23 February 1884: Cork City
Party	Candidate	Votes	%	±%
Irish Parliamentary	John Deasy	2,125	64.8	+5.3
Irish Conservative	William Goulding	1,153	35.2	+12.0
Majority		972	29.6	+23.7
Turnout		3,278	65.0	+3.4 (est)
Registered electors		5,045		
Irish Parliamentary hold		Swing	−3.4	

- Caused by Daly's resignation.
- 1882: Home Rule League/Nationalist Party becomes the Irish Parliamentary Party

General election 5 April 1880: Cork City (2 seats)
Party	Candidate	Votes	%	±%
Parnellite Home Rule League	John Daly	1,923	33.4	+3.3
Home Rule	Charles Stewart Parnell	1,505	26.1	+0.3
Irish Conservative	William Goulding	1,337	23.2	+4.5
Liberal	Nicholas Daniel Murphy	999	17.3	New
Majority		168	2.9	−4.2
Turnout		2,882 (est)	61.6 (est.)	−16.8
Registered electors		4,680		
Home Rule hold		Swing	+0.5	
Home Rule hold		Swing	−1.0	

=== Elections of the 1870s ===
By-election 25 May 1876: Cork City
Party	Candidate	Votes	%	±%
Conservative	William Goulding	1,279	38.90	+2.9
Home Rule	John Daly	1,168	35.52	
Home Rule	Denny Lane	841	25.58	
Majority		111	3.38	N/A
Turnout		3,288	74.71	−3.7
Registered electors		4,401		
Conservative gain from Home Rule		Swing		

- Death of Ronayne, on 7 May 1876

General election 6 February 1874: Cork City (2 seats)
Party	Candidate	Votes	%	±%
Home Rule	Joseph Philip Ronayne	1,917	30.1	N/A
Home Rule	Nicholas Daniel Murphy	1,643	25.8	−15.3
Conservative	William Goulding	1,191	18.7	+2.0
Conservative	James Pim	1,097	17.3	+17.2
Ind. Nationalist	John Mitchel	511	8.0	New
Majority		452	7.1	N/A
Turnout		3,435 (est)	78.4 (est.)	+4.0
Registered electors		4,381		
Home Rule gain from Liberal		Swing		
Home Rule gain from Liberal		Swing		

By-Election 10 December 1872: Cork City
Party	Candidate	Votes	%	±%
Home Rule	Joseph Philip Ronayne	1,883	62.9	New
Conservative	James Pim	1,110	37.1	+20.3
Majority		773	25.8	N/A
Turnout		2,993	67.4	−7.0
Registered electors		4,441		
Home Rule gain from Liberal		Swing		

- Death of Maguire (founder Cork Examiner), on 1 November 1872

=== Elections of the 1860s ===
General election 20 November 1868: Cork City (2 seats)
Party	Candidate	Votes	%	±%
Liberal	John Maguire	1,895	42.0	N/A
Liberal	Nicholas Daniel Murphy	1,862	41.3	N/A
Conservative	William Abbott	753	16.7	New
Conservative	Christopher Crofts	3	0.1	New
Majority		1,109	24.6	N/A
Turnout		2,632 (est)	74.4 (est)	N/A
Registered electors		3,536		
Liberal hold				
Liberal hold				

General election 12 July 1865: Cork City (2 seats)
Party	Candidate	Votes	%	±%
Liberal	Nicholas Daniel Murphy	Unopposed		
Liberal	John Maguire	Unopposed		
Registered electors		3,143		
Liberal hold				
Liberal hold				

By-Election 14 February 1865: Cork City
Party	Candidate	Votes	%	±%
Liberal	Nicholas Daniel Murphy	Unopposed		
Registered electors		3,143		
Liberal hold				

- Resignation of Lyons

=== Elections of the 1850s ===
By-election, 29 June 1859: Cork City
Party	Candidate	Votes	%	±%
Liberal	Francis Lyons	Unopposed		
Registered electors		3,073		
Liberal hold				

- Death of Fagan

General election, 6 May 1859: Cork City (2 seats)
Party	Candidate	Votes	%	±%
Liberal	Francis Beamish	1,288	26.8	N/A
Liberal	William Trant Fagan	1,231	25.6	N/A
Conservative	Andrew Jordaine Wood	1,208	25.1	New
Conservative	Barcroft Carroll	1,085	22.5	New
Majority		23	0.5	N/A
Turnout		2,406 (est)	78.3	N/A
Registered electors		3,073		
Liberal hold		Swing	N/A	
Liberal hold		Swing	N/A	

General election, 28 March 1857: Cork City (2 seats)
Party	Candidate	Votes	%	±%
Whig	William Trant Fagan	Unopposed		
Whig	Francis Beamish	Unopposed		
Registered electors		3,050		
Whig gain from Independent Irish				
Whig gain from Independent Irish				

By-election, 20 August 1853: Cork City
Party	Candidate	Votes	%	±%
Whig	Francis Beamish	1,183	54.1	−15.2
Conservative	James Charles Chatterton	1,003	45.9	+15.2
Majority		180	8.2	N/A
Turnout		2,186	69.4	+10.9
Registered electors		3,152		
Whig gain from Independent Irish		Swing	−15.2	

- Appointment of Murphy as a Commissioner of Insolvency

General election, 14 July 1852: Cork City (2 seats)
Party	Candidate	Votes	%	±%
Independent Irish	Francis Murphy	1,246	35.0	N/A
Independent Irish	William Trant Fagan	1,220	34.3	New
Conservative	James Charles Chatterton	898	25.2	N/A
Conservative	William Lumley Perrier	194	5.5	N/A
Majority		322	9.1	N/A
Turnout		1,779 (est)	58.5 (est)	+20.0
Registered electors		3,039		
Independent Irish gain from Repeal		Swing	N/A	
Independent Irish gain from Repeal		Swing	N/A	

By-Election, 23 April 1851: Cork City
Party	Candidate	Votes	%	±%
Whig	Francis Murphy	Unopposed		
Whig gain from Repeal				

- Resignation of Fagan

=== Elections of the 1840s ===
By-election, 14 November 1849: Cork City
Party	Candidate	Votes	%	±%
Conservative	James Charles Chatterton	793	57.6	New
Whig	Alexander McCarthy	584	42.4	+12.2
Majority		209	15.2	N/A
Turnout		1,377	38.5	+1.5
Registered electors		3,574 (1847 figure)		
Conservative gain from Repeal		Swing	N/A	

- Death of Callaghan

General election 9 August 1847: Cork City (2 seats)
Party	Candidate	Votes	%	±%
Repeal	William Trant Fagan	929	35.1	N/A
Repeal	Daniel Callaghan	917	34.7	−1.0
Repeal	Alexander McCarthy	799	30.2	N/A
Majority		118	4.5	−6.4
Turnout		1,323 (est)	37.0 (est.)	−10.0
Registered electors		3,574		
Repeal hold		Swing	N/A	
Repeal gain from Whig		Swing	N/A	

By-Election, 31 January 1846: Cork City
Party	Candidate	Votes	%	±%
Repeal	Alexander McCarthy	Unopposed		
Repeal gain from Whig				

- Resignation of Murphy by accepting the office of Steward of the Manor of Northstead

General election 5 July 1841: Cork City (2 seats)
Party	Candidate	Votes	%	±%
Whig	Francis Murphy	1,486	36.3	+7.1
Repeal	Daniel Callaghan	1,464	35.7	+6.8
Conservative	James Charles Chatterton	1,017	24.8	+4.0
Conservative	James Morris	131	3.2	−17.9
Turnout		2,049 (est)	47.0 (est.)	c. −11.7
Registered electors		4,364		
Majority		22	0.6	N/A
Whig gain from Repeal		Swing	+7.0	
Majority		447	10.9	+3.1
Repeal hold		Swing	+6.9	

=== Elections of the 1830s ===
General election 11 August 1837: Cork City (2 seats)
Party	Candidate	Votes	%	±%
Repeal (Whig)	Francis Beamish	1,951	29.2	+4.8
Repeal (Whig)	Daniel Callaghan	1,935	28.9	+4.2
Conservative	Joseph Leycester	1,407	21.1	−4.5
Conservative	James Charles Chatterton	1,391	20.8	−4.5
Majority		528	7.8	N/A
Turnout		3,359	58.7	−16.6
Registered electors		5,723		
Repeal gain from Conservative		Swing	+4.7	
Repeal gain from Conservative		Swing	+4.4	

General election 17 January 1835: Cork City (2 seats)
Party	Candidate	Votes	%	±%
Conservative	Joseph Leycester	1,658	25.6	+14.9
Conservative	James Charles Chatterton	1,643	25.3	+14.6
Repeal (Whig)	Daniel Callaghan	1,603	24.7	−8.6
Repeal (Whig)	Herbert Baldwin	1,580	24.4	−8.4
Majority		40	0.6	N/A
Turnout		3,359	75.3	−10.2
Registered electors		4,461		
Conservative gain from Repeal		Swing	+11.7	
Conservative gain from Repeal		Swing	+11.6	

- Note: On petition Leycester and Chatterton were unseated and Callaghan and Baldwin were declared duly elected, on 18 April 1835.

General election 21 December 1832: Cork City (2 seats)
Party	Candidate	Votes	%
Repeal	Daniel Callaghan	2,263	33.3
Repeal	Herbert Baldwin	2,225	32.8
Tory	William Newenham	1,459	21.5
Whig	John Boyle	845	12.4
Majority		1,380	20.4
Turnout		3,696	85.5
Registered electors		4,322	
Repeal hold			
Repeal gain from Whig			

General election 7 May 1831: Cork City (2 seats)
Party	Candidate	Votes	%
Whig	John Boyle (politician)	Unopposed	
Repeal	Daniel Callaghan	Unopposed	
Registered electors		3,876	
Whig hold			
Repeal gain from Whig			

General election 11 August 1830: Cork City (2 seats)
Party	Candidate	Votes	%
Whig	John Boyle (politician)	1,152	48.2
Whig	Daniel Callaghan	851	35.6
Nonpartisan	Herbert Baldwin	388	16.2
Majority		463	19.4
Turnout		c. 1,196	c. 30.8
Registered electors		3,876	
Whig hold			
Whig gain from Tory			

By-election, 29 March 1830: Cork City
Party	Candidate	Votes	%
Whig	Daniel Callaghan	1,171	50.3
Tory	William Newenham	1,155	49.7
Majority		16	0.6
Turnout		2,326	c. 60.0
Registered electors		c. 3,876	
Whig gain from Tory			

- Caused by Callaghan's election in 1829 being declared void.
- Note: Daniel Callaghan was the brother of Gerrard Callaghan. Stooks Smith classifies Callaghan as a Repealer from this election, but this may not be an accurate description for the period before 1832. See the footnote to the above table of MPs for a brief description of Callaghan's political views.

=== Elections of the 1820s ===
- Election of Callaghan declared void, on petition

By-Election 9 July 1829: Cork City
Party	Candidate	Votes	%	±%
Tory	Gerrard Callaghan	523	79.5	+30.7
Nonpartisan	Sir Augustus Warren, 3rd Baronet	135	20.5	New
Majority		388	59.0	N/A
Turnout		658		N/A
Tory hold		Swing	N/A	

- Death of Colthurst

By-Election 29 December 1826: Cork City
Party	Candidate	Votes	%	±%
Whig	John Hely-Hutchinson (politician)	1,019	51.2	N/A
Tory	Gerrard Callaghan	970	48.8	N/A
Majority		49	2.4	N/A
Turnout		1,989		N/A
Whig hold		Swing	N/A	

- Death of Hely-Hutchinson

General election 13 June 1826: Cork City (2 seats)
Party	Candidate	Votes	%	±%
Tory	Nicholas Colthurst	Unopposed	N/A	N/A
Whig	Christopher Hely-Hutchinson	Unopposed	N/A	N/A

General election 24 March 1820: Cork City (2 seats)
Party	Candidate	Votes	%	±%
Whig	Christopher Hely-Hutchinson	1,303	41.5	−2.0
Tory	Nicholas Colthurst	1,080	34.4	+3.8
Tory	Gerrard Callaghan	759	24.2	−1.6
Majority		321	10.2	−7.5
Turnout		3,142 (2,037 electors)		
Whig hold		Swing		
Tory hold		Swing		

=== Elections of the 1810s ===
General election 13 July 1818: Cork City (2 seats)
Party	Candidate	Votes	%	±%
Whig	Christopher Hely-Hutchinson	1,221	43.5	+14.8
Tory	Nicholas Colthurst	859	30.6	+0.6
Tory	Mountifort Longfield (politician)	724	25.8	−15.4
Majority		497	17.7	N/A
Turnout		2,804 (1,895 electors)		
Whig gain from Tory		Swing		
Tory hold		Swing		

General election 5 November 1812: Cork City (2 seats)
Party	Candidate	Votes	%	±%
Tory	Mountifort Longfield (politician)	918	41.2	−24.4
Tory	Nicholas Colthurst	669	30.1	N/A
Whig	Christopher Hely-Hutchinson	639	28.7	+3.1
Majority		30	1.4	N/A
Turnout		2,226 (1,400 electors)		
Tory gain from Whig		Swing		
Tory hold		Swing		

=== Elections of the 1800s ===
General election 20 May 1807: Cork City (2 seats)
Party	Candidate	Votes	%	±%
Tory	Mountifort Longfield (politician)	82	65.6	N/A
Whig	Christopher Hely-Hutchinson	32	25.6	N/A
Nonpartisan	George Freke Evans	11	8.8	New
Majority		21	16.8	N/A
Turnout		125 (87 electors)		N/A
Tory hold		Swing		
Whig hold		Swing		

General election 14 November 1806: Cork City (2 seats)
Party	Candidate	Votes	%	±%
Tory	Mountifort Longfield (politician)	Unopposed	N/A	N/A
Whig	Christopher Hely-Hutchinson	Unopposed	N/A	N/A

General election 16 July 1802: Cork City (2 seats)
Party	Candidate	Votes	%	±%
Tory	Mountifort Longfield (politician)	Unopposed	N/A	N/A
Whig	Christopher Hely-Hutchinson	Unopposed	N/A	N/A

By-Election 8 January 1802: Cork City
Party	Candidate	Votes	%	±%
Whig	Christopher Hely-Hutchinson	Unopposed	N/A	N/A
Whig hold				

- Hon. John Hely-Hutchinson created the 1st Baron Hutchinson

Co-option with effect from 1 January 1801: Cork City (2 seats)
Party	Candidate	Votes	%	±%
Tory	Mountifort Longfield (politician)	Co-opted	N/A	N/A
Whig	John Hely-Hutchinson	Co-opted	N/A	N/A

- 1801, 1 January Irish House of Commons members nominated to sit in the corresponding UK House of Commons at Westminster
