= George Crosbie =

Irish businessman and politician (1864–1934)

Senator
- In office 2 January 1932 – 27 November 1934
- In office 5 November 1931 – 9 December 1931

Personal details
- Born: 7 May 1864 Cork, Ireland
- Died: 27 November 1934 (aged 70) Cork, Ireland
- Party: Cumann na nGaedheal; Fine Gael
- Other political affiliations: Irish Parliamentary Party
- Spouses: Eva Hennessy (m. 1895; died 1927); Mai Crosbie (m. 1931)
- Children: 6
- Education: King's Inns

George Crosbie (7 May 1864 – 27 November 1934) was an Irish politician. He was a Cumann na nGaedheal member of Seanad Éireann in 1931 and from 1932 to 1934, and the only person twice elected at by-elections to the Seanad.

He was educated at St Stanislaus College. In 1886, he was admitted to King's Inns in Dublin, was called to the Irish bar in 1889, but never practised.

In the 1880s, he joined the Cork Examiner as a journalist. In 1889 he became the editor of the newspaper, and in 1899, after the death of his father Thomas, he became chairman of Thomas Crosbie & Co. Ltd, which owned the Cork Examiner.

He unsuccessfully contested the 1909 Cork City by-election as an Irish Parliamentary Party candidate, receiving 43% of the vote. He was an unsuccessful candidate at the 1925 Seanad election. He was elected at a by-election on 5 November 1931 to fill the vacancy caused by the death of Patrick Hooper. He lost his seat at the 1931 Seanad election but was elected at a by-election on 2 January 1932 to fill the vacancy caused by the resignation of Alfie Byrne. He died in office on 27 November 1934.
