= Francis Lyon (footballer) =

Australian rules footballer

Personal information
- Full name: Francis William Lyon
- Born: 10 August 1895; Korong Vale, Victoria
- Died: 28 January 1964 (aged 68); Heidelberg, Victoria
- Original team: Police / Korong Vale
- Height: 184 cm (6 ft 0 in)
- Weight: 81 kg (179 lb)

Playing career^{1}
Years	Club	Games (Goals)
1921	Melbourne	1 (0)
- ^{1} Playing statistics correct to the end of 1921.

Francis William Lyon (10 August 1895 – 28 January 1964) was an Australian rules footballer who played with Melbourne in the Victorian Football League (VFL).
