= Francis Lyons (politician) =

Irish Liberal politician

Member of Parliament for Cork City
- In office 29 June 1859 – 14 February 1865 Serving with Francis Beamish
- Preceded by: William Trant Fagan; Francis Beamish
- Succeeded by: Francis Beamish; Nicholas Daniel Murphy

Personal details
- Born: 1798
- Died: Unknown
- Party: Liberal

Francis Lyons (born 1798) was an Irish Liberal politician.

Lyons was elected as one of the two Members of Parliament (MPs) for Cork City at a by-election in 1859—caused by the death of William Trant Fagan—and held the seat until 1865 when he resigned, due to bad health, by accepting the office of Steward of the Manor of Hempholme.

Parliament of the United Kingdom
Preceded by William Trant Fagan; Francis Beamish	Member of Parliament for Cork City; 1859–1865; With: Francis Beamish	Succeeded by Francis Beamish; Nicholas Daniel Murphy
