= Nicholas Daniel Murphy =

Irish politician

Nicholas Daniel Murphy (1811– 6 January 1889) was an Irish politician from Cork. He was a Member of Parliament (MP) from 1865 to 1880.

Standing as a Liberal, he was elected to the Parliament of the United Kingdom at a by-election on 14 February 1865 for Cork City, after the resignation from the House of Commons of the Liberal MP Francis Lyons. He was re-elected unopposed at the general election in July 1865, and held the seat against Irish Conservative Party candidates at the 1868 general election. In 1874, having joined the new Home Rule League (founded in 1873), he was returned to the House of Commons for a fourth time, defeating both Conservative candidates and an independent nationalist.

However, at the 1880 general election, he stood once again as a Liberal, but lost his seat.

Parliament of the United Kingdom
Preceded by Francis Lyons; Francis Beamish	Member of Parliament for Cork City; 1865 – 1880; With: Francis Beamish to July 1865; John Maguire 1865–1872; Joseph Philip Ronayne 1872–1876; William Goulding 1876–1880	Succeeded by John Daly; Charles Stewart Parnell
