= William Goulding =

Irish Conservative Party politician

William Goulding (15 November 1817 – 8 December 1884) was an Irish Conservative Party politician from Cork. He was a Member of Parliament (MP) from 1876 to 1880.

At the general election in February 1874, he stood unsuccessfully as a candidate in Cork City, where both seats were won by nationalist Repeal Association candidates. After the Home Rule League MP Joseph Ronayne died in May 1876, the nationalist vote at the resulting by-election was split between two candidates for the single seat, and Goulding won the seat in the House of Commons. However, at the 1880 general election, nationalists fielded only two candidates for Cork's two seats, and Goulding was defeated.

He stood again at the by-election in February 1884 after the resignation of John Daly, but was defeated again. Two Conservatives candidates contested Cork City at the 1885 general election, and one Unionist candidate stood at the by-election in 1891, but Goulding was the last Conservative or Unionist to be elected as MP for Cork City.

After his death in 1884, a stained glass window representing the Good Shepherd was erected to his memory on the east wall of Taney parish church in Dundrum, County Dublin.

== Descendants ==
His son William Goulding (1856–1925), a prominent freemason who was director of several railway companies in Ireland, was made a baronet in 1904. The 3rd Baronet, Basil Goulding, was a notable art collector and the husband of Valerie Goulding, an Irish senator and campaigner for disabled people.

Parliament of the United Kingdom
Preceded by Joseph Philip Ronayne; Nicholas Daniel Murphy	Member of Parliament for Cork City; 1876 – 1880; With: Nicholas Daniel Murphy	Succeeded by Charles Stewart Parnell; John Daly
