= Maurice Healy (politician) =

Irish nationalist politician (1859–1923)

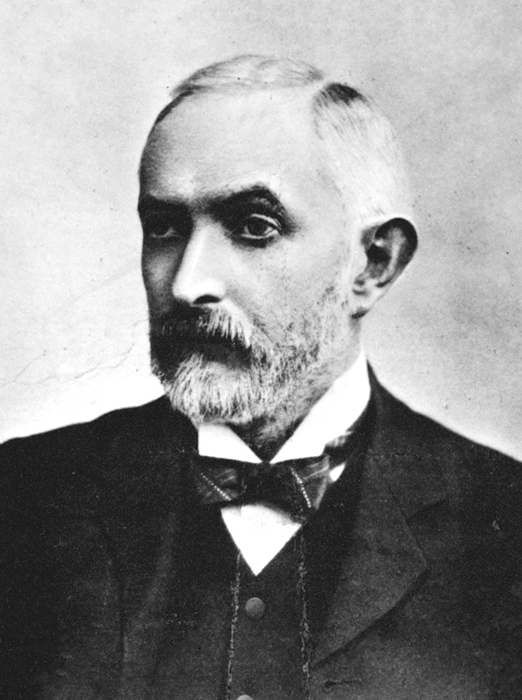
- Maurice Healy, 1910

Member of Parliament for Cork City
- In office 1885–1900 Serving with Charles Stewart Parnell; William O'Brien
- Preceded by: John Deasy
- Succeeded by: William O'Brien

Member of Parliament for Cork City
- In office May 1909 – Jan. 1910 Serving with Augustine Roche
- Preceded by: William O'Brien
- Succeeded by: William O'Brien

Member of Parliament for North East Cork
- In office Jan. 1910 – Dec. 1910
- Preceded by: William O'Brien
- Succeeded by: Moreton Frewen

Personal details
- Born: 3 January 1859 Bantry, County Cork, Ireland
- Died: 9 November 1923 (aged 64) Ballintemple, County Cork, Ireland
- Party: Irish Parliamentary Party; Irish National Federation; People's Rights Association; All-for-Ireland League
- Relations: Maurice Healy (son); Tim Healy (brother); Thomas Healy (brother); Kevin O'Higgins (nephew)

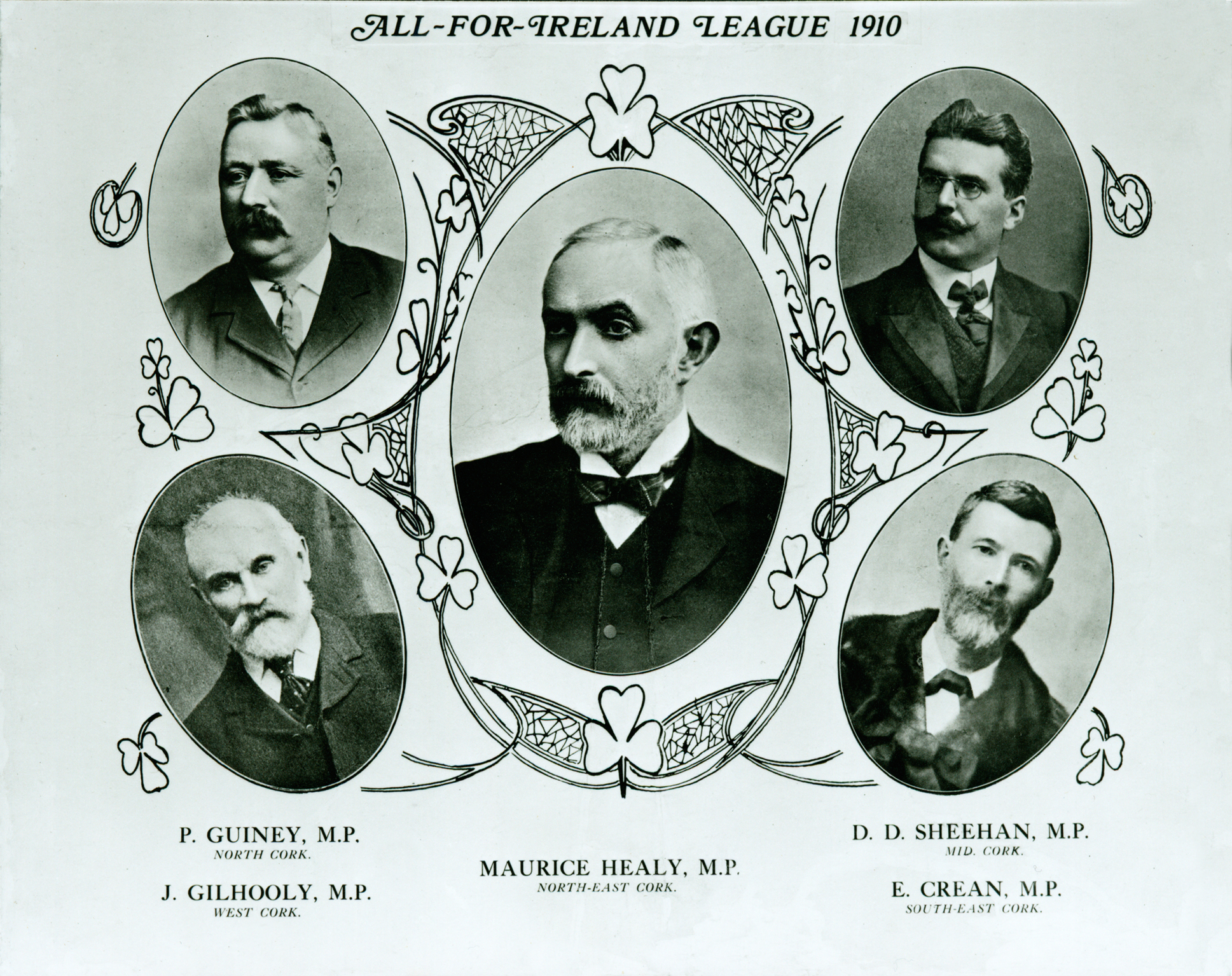
1910 election poster for All-for-Ireland League, Maurice Healy is centre.

Maurice Healy (3 January 1859 – 9 November 1923) was an Irish nationalist politician, lawyer and member of parliament (MP). As a member of the Irish Parliamentary Party, he was returned to the House of Commons of the United Kingdom of Great Britain and Ireland four times between 1885 and 1918.

He was one of twins, the third son born to Maurice, a Poor Law Union clerk, and Eliza (née Sullivan) Healy, in Bantry. His mother died during the birth. As he grew up he became very close to his elder brother Tim Healy. It is said that the nurse placed Maurice in the young Tim's arms and said, "This little boy has no mother now and you will have to be a mother to him". Both brothers married Sullivans who were first cousins to their husbands and to each other. The orphaned children were effectively raised by their maternal grandmother, Jane Sullivan. The family moved to Lismore, where he was educated at the local Christian Brothers school.

Admitted as a solicitor in 1882, he practised as such and was returned to parliament four times, first as a member of the Irish Parliamentary Party for Cork city from 1885 to 1890, then as a member of the Irish National Federation for 2 years before joining the People's Rights Association (a party founded and led by his brother, Tim Healy).

In 1900, standing as a Healyite nationalist he was defeated by William O'Brien in a bitter campaign.

He was returned again for Cork City in May 1909 to January 1910.

In 1910, for North East Cork, this time as a supporter and member of William O'Brien's All-for-Ireland Party (AFIL). From the December 1910 general election until the December 1918 general election he again represented Cork City. He was generally considered one of the finest Irish lawyers of his generation, and exceptionally conscientious in his handling of a case.

His force in parliament was land law. He was a close confidant of his brother and although more retiring and stolid than his better-known elder brother, Tim, he was considered the more intelligent and often acted as a counterbalance to his brother's emotionality. On the outbreak of World War I in 1914 a son of each enlisted in one of the Irish Divisions.

His uncle, Timothy Daniel Sullivan, was also a member of parliament, as was his oldest brother, Thomas Joseph Healy and father-in-law Alexander Martin Sullivan. His son, also called Maurice (1887–1943), educated at Clongowes Wood College stood unsuccessfully as an AFIL candidate for West Waterford in December 1910, was a regular contributor (including much satirical verse) to the O'Brienite Cork Free Press.

Maurice (junior) moved to England after the founding of the Irish Free State where he was both a successful lawyer, and a broadcaster for the BBC during the early years of World War II. He wrote the well-known legal memoir The Old Munster Circuit and the popular Stay Me With Flagons: A Book about Wine and Other Things.

Maurice (senior) died at his residence, Ballintemple, Cork, on 9 November 1923. He was buried in St. Joseph's Cemetery.

== Sources ==
- Paul Bew, Healy, Timothy Michael (1855–1931) in: Oxford Dictionary of National Biography (Oxford University Press, 2004)
- Patrick Maume The long Gestation, Irish Nationalist Life 1891–1918 (1999)
- Tim Cadogan & Jeremiah Falvey A Biographical Dictionary of Cork (2006)

Parliament of the United Kingdom
Preceded by John Deasy	Member of Parliament for Cork City; 1885–1900	Succeeded by William O'Brien
Preceded by William O'Brien	Member of Parliament for Cork City; 1909–1910	Succeeded by William O'Brien
Preceded by William O'Brien	Member of Parliament for North East Cork; March–December 1910	Succeeded by Moreton Frewen
Preceded by Augustine Roche	Member of Parliament for Cork City; 1910–1918	Succeeded by Liam de Róiste; J. J. Walsh
