= Daniel Callaghan (politician) =

Irish politician (1786–1849)

Daniel (Dan) Callaghan (1786–1849) was a prominent businessman and Irish politician who served as MP for Cork City from 1830 to 1849 (1830–1832 as a member of the Whig Party; 1832–1849 as a member of the Irish Repeal Association). As a member of the Repeal Association, Callaghan sought to end the Act of Union (1800), which created the United Kingdom of Great Britain and Ireland. Callaghan, along with other Irish MPs like Daniel O'Connell, opposed the introduction of the Poor Laws (Ireland), which established the Victorian workhouses to Ireland.

Daniel Callaghan was brother of Gerard Callaghan, who served as an MP for Cork City from 1829 to 1832 as a member of the Tory Party, and the grandfather of Admiral George Callaghan.

Daniel Callaghan, who lived at Lotabeg House in Cork from the first half of the 19th century, died in 1849.
