= Jeffrey B. Gibson =

American academic

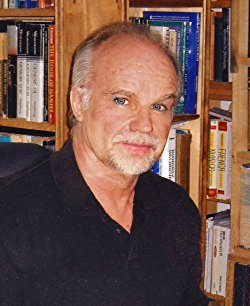
- Education: Purdue University (B.A.); Oxford University (B.A., M.A., D.Phil.)
- Occupation: Professor
- Employer(s): Harold Washington College, Garrett–Evangelical Theological Seminary, DePaul University, Oakton Community College, Lewis University, Columbia College Chicago, Wilbur Wright College, Loyola University Chicago, Truman College, Seabury-Western Theological Seminary, Roosevelt University.
- Known for: Historical Jesus, Gospel of Mark

Jeffrey B. Gibson is an American academic studying the New Testament and Early Christianity. He received his D.Phil. from the University of Oxford in 1993 and is the author of The Temptations of Jesus in Early Christianity (1995) and The Disciples' Prayer: The Prayer Jesus Taught in Its Historical Setting (2015). He has also published articles and reviews in the Journal of Theological Studies, The Bible Translator, The Expository Times, Religion, The Journal for the Study of the New Testament, The Dictionary of New Testament Background, Eerdman’s Dictionary of the Bible, and The Encyclopedia of the Historical Jesus.

== Education ==
Gibson received his first Bachelor of Arts in 1974 from Purdue University, where he double majored in theater and philosophy. He later completed his second Bachelor of Arts in theology from Oxford University in 1977. He completed his D.Phil. at Oxford University in 1993 under the direction of George Caird and John Muddiman. His thesis was entitled "The Traditions of the Temptations of Jesus in Early Christianity," and served as the foundation of his first book (published in 1995 by Sheffield Academic Press under the same name). While at Oxford, he was awarded the Trinity College Award for Outstanding Work in 1976 and the Hall-Houghton Studentship in Greek New Testament from 1982 to 1983.

== Career ==
Gibson has worked as an adjunct professor for numerous institutions from 1989 to 2011. These include Harold Washington College, Garrett–Evangelical Theological Seminary, DePaul University, Oakton Community College, Lewis University, Columbia College Chicago, Wilbur Wright College, Loyola University Chicago, Truman College, Seabury-Western Theological Seminary, Roosevelt University.

He is the author of two books: The Temptations of Jesus in Early Christianity (1995) and The Disciples' Prayer: The Prayer Jesus Taught in Its Historical Setting (2015).

He served as the executive secretary of the Chicago Society of Biblical Research from 1997 to 2007.

He is the founder, moderator, and list own of several online biblical studies websites and forums: Corpus Paulinum, XTalk, and Kata Markon. He has also led online seminars devoted to John Dominic Crossan's The Birth of Christianity, James Dunn (theologian)'s "Jesus in Oral Memory," Richard A. Horsley's The Message and the Kingdom, Dale Allison's Jesus of Nazareth: Millenarian Prophet, and Gerd Lüdemann's The Resurrection of Christ.

Gibson is also interested in photography and poetry.

== Publications ==
=== Books ===
- The Disciples' Prayer: The Prayer Jesus Taught in Its Historical Setting. Minneapolis: Fortress Press, 2015.
- The Temptations of Jesus in Early Christianity. JSNT, Sup 112. Sheffield: Sheffield Academic Press, 1995.

=== Book chapters ===
- "Echoes of "the Voice": Psalm 29 in the Fathers." Psalm 29 through Time and Tradition, edited by Lowell K. Handy. Eugene: Wipf and Stock, 2009: 25–36.
- "The Function of the Charge of Blasphemy in Mark 14:64." The Trial and Death of Jesus: Essays on the Passion Narrative in Mark (Contributions to Biblical Exegesis and Theology 45). Edited by Geert van Oyen and Tom Shepherd. Leuven: Peeters, 2006: 171–187.
- "Paul’s ‘Dying Formula’: Prolegomena to an Understanding of Its Import and Significance." Celebrating Romans: Template for Pauline Theology. Edited by Shelia McGinn. Grand Rapids: Eerdmans, 2004: 20–41.

=== Encyclopedia entries ===
- "Angels." The Encyclopedia of the Historical Jesus. Edited by Craig A. Evans. Oxford: Routledge, 2008: 6–8.
- "Satan", "Devil." Eerdmans Dictionary of the Bible. Edited by David Noel Freedman. Grand Rapids: Eerdmans, 2000: 343–344.
- "Testing/Temptation." Dictionary of New Testament Backgrounds. Edited by Craig A. Evans and Stanley E. Porter. Inter-Varsity Press: 1209–1210.

=== Journal articles ===
- "Matt. 6:9-16//Lk. 11:2-4: An Eschatological Prayer?" Biblical Theology Bulletin 31(2002): 96–105.
- "A Turn on `Turning Stones to Bread': A New Understanding of the Devil's Intention in Q 4.3." Biblical Research 41 (1996): 37–57.
- "Another Look at Why Jesus `Sighs Deeply': αναστενάζω in Mk. 8:12a." Journal of Theological Studies 47 (1996): 1–10.
- "Jesus' Wilderness Temptation according to Mark." Journal for the Study of the New Testament 53 (1994): 3–34.
- "Jesus' Refusal to Produce a 'Sign' (Mk. 8:11-13)." Journal for the Study of the NewTestament 38 (1990): 37–66.
- "Mk. 8:12a. Why Does Jesus 'Sigh Deeply'?" Technical Papers for the Bible Translator 38 (1987): 122–125.
- "The Rebuke of the Disciples in Mark 8:14-21." Journal for the Study of the New Testament 27 (1986): 31–47.
- "HOI TELONAI KAI HAI PORNAI." Journal of Theological Studies 32 (1981): 429–433.
