= H. Wheeler Robinson =

British theologian

Doctor Henry Wheeler Robinson

Principal of Regent's Park College, Oxford
- In office 1920–1942
- Preceded by: George Pearce Gould
- Succeeded by: E. A. Payne

Henry Wheeler Robinson (7 February 1872 in Northampton, England – 12 May 1945 in Oxford, England) was a British theologian.

== Career ==
H. Wheeler Robinson was educated at Regent's Park Baptist College, then still in London, the University of Edinburgh, Mansfield College, Oxford, and the Universities of Marburg and Strasbourg. He began his ministry at Pitlochry and then at St Michael's, Coventry. In 1926, he received the degree of Doctor of Divinity honoris causa from the University of Edinburgh.

He was Principal of Regent's Park Baptist College from 1920 to 1942, and was responsible for moving the college from London to its present location in Oxford. When he came to Oxford as Principal of Regent's Park College, he was the most outstanding British Old Testament scholar of the day. The Faculty of Theology immediately appointed him as an examiner, and he became a Reader in Biblical Criticism in 1934 and the Old Testament tutor for Mansfield College.

He was President of the Society for Old Testament Study in 1929 and Acting President 1941–45.

== Publications ==
- The religious ideas of the Old Testament (London: Duckworth, 1913)
- The Christian doctrine of man (2nd edn, Edinburgh: T. & T. Clark, 1913)
- Baptist principles (London: Kingsgate Press, 1925)
- The cross of Jeremiah (London: SCM, 1925)
- The cross of the servant: a study in Deutero-Isaiah (London: SCM, 1926)
- The life and faith of the Baptists (London: Methuen, 1927)
- The Christian experience of the Holy Spirit (London: Nisbet, 1928)
- The veil of God (London : Nisbet, 1936)
- Baptists in Britain (London: Baptist Union, 1937)
- The Old Testament, its making and meaning (New York: Abingdon Press, 1937)
- The cross of Job (2nd edn, London: SCM, 1938)
- Suffering human and divine (London: SCM, 1940)
- Redemption and revelation: in the actuality of history (London: Nisbet, 1942)
- Inspiration and revelation in the Old Testament (Oxford: Clarendon Press, 1946)
- Two Hebrew prophets: studies in Hosea and Ezekiel (London: Lutterworth Press, 1948)
- The history of Israel: its facts and factors (London: Duckworth, 1949)
- The cross in the Old Testament (London: SCM, 1960)
- Corporate personality in ancient Israel (rev. edn, Edinburgh: T. & T. Clark, 1981)

== Humorous reference ==
There exists in the McPherson Library, University of Victoria, an undated letter from Freddy Hood, a member of the Chapter, and later Principal, of Pusey House, to John Betjeman, in which he wrote,

If you can possibly come to a meeting of the NICENE at Mansfield SCR tonight...at 8.15. Wheeler Robinson on "The Marriage of Cana and its Significance in Theology". It will be frightfully funny - I want you to come and take part in the discussion "speaking as an Irvingite I should like to suggest..." Do try ever so hard.

(John Betjeman was not, of course, an Irvingite).

== Legacy ==
Rex Mason devoted his Presidential Address to the Society for Old Testament Study to the topic, H. Wheeler Robinson Revisited. He argued that Wheeler Robinson's work was rooted in his interest in Hebrew Psychology, while he was also influenced by developments in sociology and anthropology. Mason argued that the most significant aspect of Wheeler Robinson's work was not in the concept of Corporate Personality, but rather in the concept of the invasion of the human psyche by the divine Spirit. Wheeler Robinson had found that this concept in fact originated in animism, though it was subsequently developed to much greater religious depth in Hebrew thought.

The sociological and anthropological material on which Wheeler Robinson drew was later discredited. However, Mason believed that Wheeler Robinson's main concepts were drawn from his study of the Hebrew and Christian Scriptures themselves, and that his use of comparative material from the ancient Near East served mainly as an illustration, rather than a source, for his ideas. In conclusion, Mason found that Wheeler Robinson anticipated subsequent developments in Old Testament scholarship, and especially those developments that were critical of "Biblical Theology" - a movement that Mason claims Wheeler Robinson himself would have rejected.

Wheeler Robinson left an enduring legacy and is still considered a major scholar whose influence on Old Testament studies is felt long after his own time. A building at Regent's Park College, Oxford, Wheeler Robinson House, is named in his honour.

== Family ==
His son Bernard Robinson (1904-1997) was a physicist on Ernest Rutherford's team at the Cavendish Laboratory in Cambridge and an influential amateur musician. Robinson founded the annual Bothampstead Music Camp in 1935, which continued at the farmland site in Berkshire most years until 1966, when it moved to Speen in Buckinghamshire. Many professional (or future professional) musicians participated in Music Camp over the years, including Dennis Brain, Colin Davis, John Gardner, Peter Pears and more. Robinson was the author of An Amateur in Music (1985). He married the pianist Alice Dodds (nee Bradley-Moore) in 1933, and after her death married Elizabeth Orloff-Davidoff, daughter of Thomas Evelyn Scott-Ellis, 8th Baron Howard de Walden and Margherita van Raalt, on 31 October 1959.
