= Willoughby Bertie =

Willoughby Bertie may refer to:

- Willoughby Bertie, 3rd Earl of Abingdon (1692–1760)
- Willoughby Bertie, 4th Earl of Abingdon (1740–1799)
