= Peregrine Bertie (Royal Navy officer) =

British naval officer and politician

Captain Peregrine Francis Bertie (13 March 1741 – 20 August 1790) was a British naval officer and politician who sat in the House of Commons from 1774 to 1790.

The third son of Willoughby Bertie, 3rd Earl of Abingdon, he was educated at Westminster School. Commissioned a lieutenant in the Royal Navy on 17 December 1759, he was promoted commander on 1 January 1762 and given command of the sloop HMS Despatch. He was made a post-captain on 6 November 1762 and commanded the fifth-rate Repulse until February 1763. He got another command, the frigate HMS Shannon, that August, which he took to Africa and then the Leeward Islands before giving up command in 1764. In 1766, he inherited the Norreys estates, including Weston-on-the-Green, Oxfordshire and Yattendon, Hampstead Norreys, and Bothampstead in Berkshire, from his second cousin once removed, Norreys Bertie.

Bertie entered Parliament as MP for Oxford in 1774 on the interest of his brother, the 4th Earl of Abingdon. A Tory like the rest of the family, he was noted in 1780 as an opposition member who rarely attended Parliament. Lord Abingdon was a supporter of the Shelburne Ministry, and made sure that Bertie was on hand to vote in support of the peace preliminaries to end the American Revolutionary War in February 1783. Bertie also went to sea again for the first time in almost twenty years: he briefly commanded HMS Fortitude in early 1783.

When he inherited them in 1766, the Norreys estates were encumbered with an annuity to his sister Elizabeth, wife of John Gallini. In 1784, Gallini and Elizabeth bought the manors of Hampstead Norreys and Bothampstead from Peregrine, followed in 1785 by the adjacent manor of Yattendon.

Bertie went to sea for the last time, commanding HMS Carnatic, guard ship at Plymouth, from April 1786 to 1788. His one recorded speech in Parliament was in opposition to the government, in favor of John Pollexfen Bastard's motion in 1788 on naval promotions.

Despite voting against the First Pitt the Younger ministry over the Regency Bill in 1789, the Pittite Abingdon again returned Peregrine for Westbury in the 1790 election on 16 June 1790. He had just married (on 7 May) Elizabeth Hutchins, but they had no children, as he died on 20 August, before Parliament opened. He left his remaining estate at Weston-on-the-Green to his brother, Lord Abingdon, and made provision for one illegitimate daughter by his housekeeper.

Parliament of Great Britain
Preceded by Hon. William Harcourt; Lord Robert Spencer	Member of Parliament for Oxford; 1774–1790; With: Lord Robert Spencer 1774–1790; Francis Burton 1790	Succeeded by Francis Burton; Arthur Annesley
