= Norreys Bertie =

English politician

Norreys Bertie (?1718 – 25 October 1766) was an English Tory politician. From a junior branch of the Bertie family which had inherited estates at Weston-on-the-Green in Oxfordshire, he represented that county in Parliament from 1743 until standing down before the bitterly contested 1754 election. He was unfriendly to the Hanoverian succession and sat in opposition to the government.

Norreys was the son of James Bertie (d. 1728), of Springfield, Essex, and Elizabeth Harris, and grandson of Hon. Henry Bertie and Philadelphia Norreys. His father succeeded to the Norreys estates upon the death of James Norreys in 1718, (Note: The Norreys estates are sometimes said to have been inherited by the Berties after the death of Sir Edward Norreys in 1712, his sons having died during his lifetime, but in fact his youngest son James survived him, served as High Sheriff of Oxfordshire in 1714, died in 1718, and left his lands to his nephew James Bertie.) and Norreys succeeded him in 1728. The estates included the manors of Weston-on-the Green in Oxfordshire, Yattendon, Hampstead Norreys, and Bothampstead in Berkshire. He matriculated at Magdalen College, Oxford on 5 December 1734, at the age of 16. He received his MA on 27 May 1738. On 12 September 1741, he bought the manor of Notley and Notley Abbey from his uncle, Rev. Charles.

At the 1741 election, his second cousin once removed, the Earl of Abingdon, supported him as a Tory candidate for Westbury. Bertie and the opposition Whig John Bance were both defeated by the Government candidates, Joseph Townshend and Hon. George Evans. He stood again in 1743, at a by-election in Oxfordshire following the succession of the 3rd Earl of Lichfield to the peerage. Oxfordshire was a Tory stronghold in which the Bertie and Norreys families had traditionally been prominent, and Bertie was returned unopposed. He sat in opposition to the Carteret and Pelham ministries, and in the debate in January 1744, spoke for the recall and disbanding of the British troops in Flanders. He also opposed the employment of Hanoverian troops, and refused to join the Oxfordshire association in defense of the Hanoverian succession during the Jacobite rising of 1745. At the 1747 election, he was returned unopposed in Oxfordshire, and for unknown reasons received a single vote at Westbury (where the Abingdon interest backed Bance and the Tory Paul Methuen). He opposed the regency bill in 1751, and seconded a motion for the reduction of the army in that year.

At the 1754 election, Bertie stood down but continued to support the Tory candidates for Oxfordshire, which experienced a particularly tempestuous poll. Bertie spent the end of his life on the continent, evidently in increasing financial straits; he was forced to mortgage Notley Abbey to discharge the mortgage on Hampstead Norreys farm. He was not able to redeem Notley and sold it to the banker Francis Child on 12 September 1758. Bertie died bankrupt at Ghent in 1766. Unmarried, he left his estate to his second cousin once removed, Captain Peregrine Bertie. Hampstead Norreys was charged with an annuity to Peregrine's sister Elizabeth, wife of John Gallini.

== Notes ==
Parliament of Great Britain
Preceded by Sir James Dashwood; Viscount Quarendon	Member of Parliament for Oxfordshire; 1743–1754; With: Sir James Dashwood	Succeeded by Viscount Parker; Sir Edward Turner
