= Arthur Annesley (1760–1841) =

British land-owner

Arthur Annesley (1760 - 20 January 1841) was a British land-owner and a Member of Parliament for Oxford from 1790 to 1796.

== Early life and family ==
Arthur Annesley was born in 1760 and baptised on 16 August 1760, the eldest son of Arthur Annesley of Bletchington, Oxfordshire, who died in February 1773, and his wife, Elizabeth Baldwin.

He married, on 1 February 1785, Catherine Hardy, daughter of Admiral Sir Charles Hardy, and had the following children together:

- The Right Honourable Arthur Annesley, tenth Viscount Valentia (1785 - 1863). He inherited the Viscountcy of Valentia from a distant cousin. He married, 12 August 1808, Eleanor, daughter of Henry Stafford O'Brien of Blatherwycke Park and had issue.
- Reverend Charles Annesley Francis Annesley (1787 - 1863).
- Catherine Elizabeth Annesley (1791 - 1759). She married, on 4 May 1814, the Rev. the Hon. John Evelyn Boscawen, Canon of Canterbury, and had issue.
- Barbara Caroline Annesley (1797 - 1883). She married, on 15 October 1814, Thomas Tyrwhitt-Drake, MP for Amersham, and had issue.
- Mary Annesley (1800 - 1827) married on 7 August 1826, the Rev. John Tyrwhitt-Drake, Rector of Amersham.
- Lucy Susan Martha Annesley (born 1801).
- Francis Annesley (died 1811).
- James Annesley (died 1828).
- George Martin Annesley (died 1824). Died while in the military service of the East India Company.
- Charlotte Annesley (died 1806).

== Public service and later life ==
Annesley served as Sheriff of Oxfordshire for a year, beginning in 1784. In 1790, the Hon. Peregrine Bertie, brother of the fourth Earl of Abingdon, died shortly after being elected MP for Oxford earlier that year. The freemen of the borough sponsored Annesley, who was connected with Lord Abingdon. The election was a relatively easy victory for Annesley, who did not spend on it, and whose only opposition, in the form of George Ogilvie, came from a minority of freemen and has been described as "feeble and opportunist". Annesley won by 618 votes, to Ogilvie's 103.

He supported the Government of William Pitt the younger, but left relatively mark on Parliament's history, being recorded voting on only a handful of occasions, including on the Test Act in Scotland. He was defeated at the 1796 election by a London merchant, Henry Peters, who is estimated to have spent £10,000 on the election. It is possible that it was Annesley who supported John Ingram Lockhart to stand (unsuccessfully) in 1802 in an effort to oust Peters.

He never returned to Parliament, although he remained active in local politics, in 1806, for instance, he opposed the Duke of Marlborough's candidate for Oxford. He died on 20 January 1841, aged 80.

Parliament of Great Britain
Preceded by Francis Burton; Hon. Peregrine Bertie	Member of Parliament for Oxford; 1790 – 1796; With: Francis Burton	Succeeded by Francis Burton; Henry Peters
