= Giovanni Gallini =

Italian dancer, choreographer and impresario

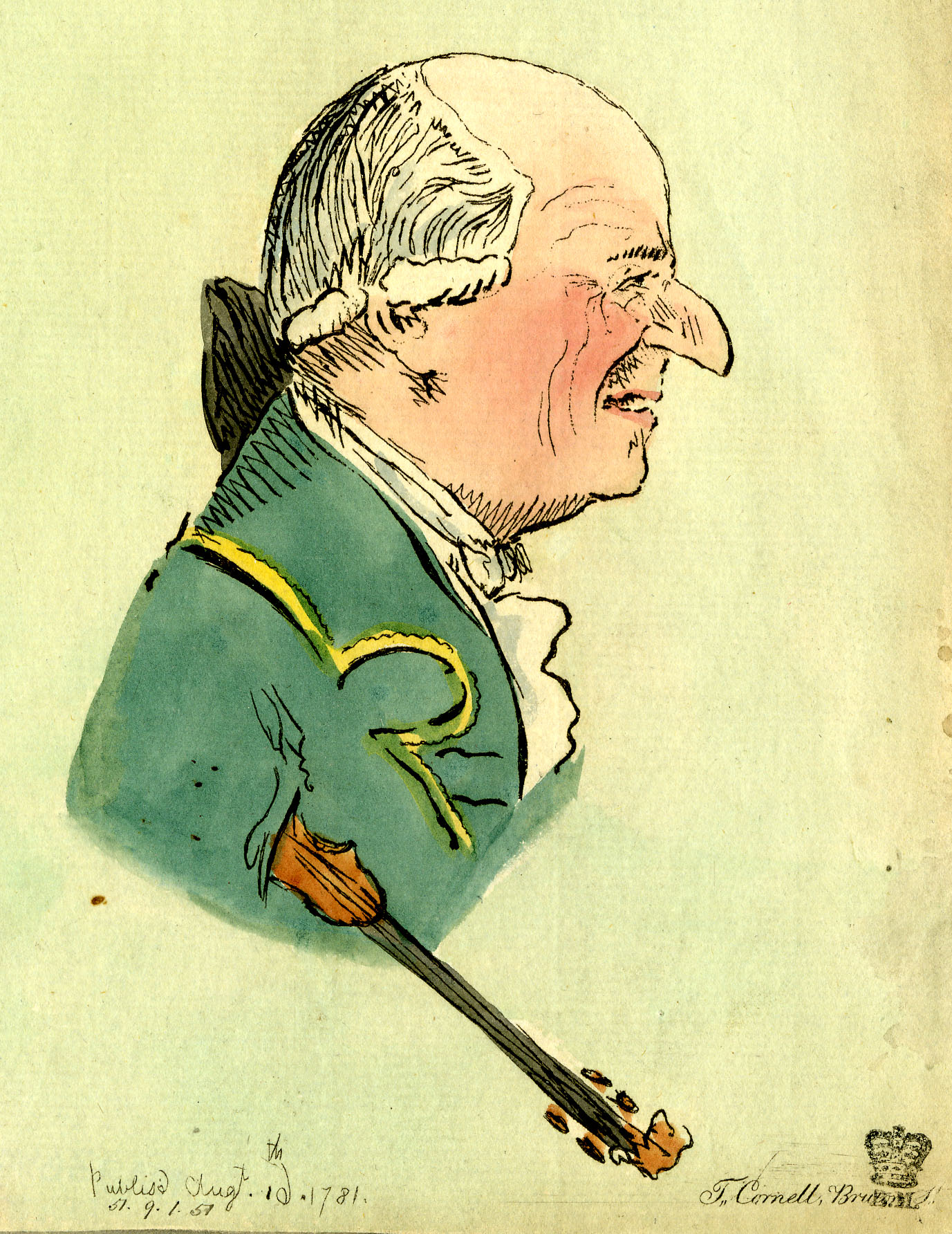
Gallini in a hand-coloured etching of 1781

Giovanni Andrea Battista Gallini (born Florence, Grand Duchy of Tuscany, 7 January 1728, died London, 5 January 1805), later known as Sir John Andrew Gallini, was an Italian dancer, choreographer and impresario who was made a "Knight of the Order of the Golden Spur" by the Pope following a successful performance.

He was the grandson of Domenico Gallini, his father was Luca Gallini and his mother was Maria Umilta Agostini, the daughter of Giovanni Agostini. Gallini was trained in Paris by François Marcel and emigrated to England at an unknown date, though he had been performing at the Académie Royale de Musique. By 17 December 1757 he was dancing at Covent Garden Theatre. Between 1758 and 1766 he performed and served as director of dances at the King's Theatre now Her Majesty's Theatre, Haymarket (the opera house), except for an interval at Covent Garden in late 1763 and 1764. He ceased to perform in public at the end of the 1766 season.

In a campaign to raise the intellectual respectability of dance, on 3 March 1762 Gallini published A Treatise on the Art of Dancing, which was followed by Critical Observations on the Art of Dancing (1770). Dance historians agree that these elegantly printed volumes were largely derivative, citing Weaver, Cahusac, and other sources, but were important statements of philosophy that helped gain Gallini entrée into society.

== Marriage into the aristocracy ==
While teaching dance, at which he was expert, he courted and married privately, on 23 February 1763 at St James's, Westminster, Lady Elizabeth Peregrine Bertie (d. 1804), the daughter of Willoughby Bertie, 3rd Earl of Abingdon. She gave birth to twin sons Francis Cecil Gallini and John Andrea Gallini on 13 October 1766 and later to two daughters, Joyce Ann Gallini and Louise Gallini. Notwithstanding outrage in parts of the fashionable world, her family accepted the match. However, the marriage eventually broke down, and in later years the couple lived apart. In 1766, Norreys Bertie left his estates to Elizabeth's brother Captain Peregrine, charging Hampstead Norreys with an annuity to Elizabeth.

Willoughby Bertie, 4th Earl of Abingdon, was a music patron and composer, as well as a political writer and his brother-in-law. Gallini brought Bertie into contact with J.C. Bach and Carl Friedrich Abel, and he was subsequently very involved in their careers. Gallini was a friend of Haydn's, who may have encouraged Bertie to compose. Haydn went to Vienna, and there he was found by Johann Peter Salomon, the great German-born violinist and impresario who had settled in London, where he gave successful subscription concerts. Salomon had read of Prince Esterházy's death while recruiting singers in Cologne and had hastened to Vienna to engage Haydn, and if possible Mozart as well (but Mozart was already committed to composing Die Zauberflöte and was not free). Salomon was a brilliant businessman and his proposal to Haydn was so attractive that the composer could hardly refuse: 3000 gulden from the great impresario Gallini, director of the King's Theatre in the Haymarket, for a new opera and 100 gulden for each of twenty new instrumental or vocal pieces to be conducted by Haydn in Salomon's subscription concerts. As soon as Haydn set foot on English soil, 5000 gulden (£500 were then the equivalent of 4883 gulden) were to be deposited in Haydn's Viennese bank, Fries & Co.

== Work as an impresario: opera and ballet ==
In addition to the money and property his wife brought him, Gallini, who was famously parsimonious, accumulated a substantial fortune. On 28 June 1774, with Johann Christian Bach and Carl Friedrich Abel, he purchased premises in Hanover Square, where the three men built a splendid concert hall—the Hanover Square Rooms—95 feet by 30. Gallini bought out his partners on 12 November 1776 and continued to operate the hall successfully for the rest of his life, making large sums from series such as the Professional Concert and Academy of Ancient Music, and from masquerades held there.

Not content, in the spring of 1778 Gallini attempted to buy the opera at the King's Theatre, Haymarket. Xenophobia against him coalesced into a bidding war won by Richard Brinsley Sheridan and Thomas Harris, who paid the outlandish price of £22,000 for the enterprise (all of it borrowed). Unfamiliar with opera, they began losing large sums; meanwhile, Gallini embarked on an aggressive campaign to force them out. After seven years of transfers of authority, forced declarations of bankruptcy, feuding trustees, and sheriff's sales, he achieved his wish, though the conditions were far from ideal. He served as trustee for William Taylor, who loathed him, harassed him, and sued him year after year, and he had to operate under a budget cap of £18,000 enforced by the court of chancery. The lord chamberlain, who regarded him as an undesirable foreigner, made him struggle to get a licence to perform.

Surprisingly, Gallini paid more attention to opera than to dance, mounting highly creditable seasons. To supplement the Italian repertory he began to import both works and performers from German houses, and he drew to England such major performers as Gertrud Elisabeth Mara and the castratos, Giovanni Maria Rubinelli and Luigi Marchesi.

Dance required more than a single star, however. Without a major choreographer, even Auguste Vestris's performance seemed less brilliant, and although Jean-Georges Noverre returned at the end of 1787 the talent provided for him to work with was so limited that in February 1789 a riotous audience demanded that better dancers be imported. Even after Marie-Madeleine Guimard consented to a short visit for exorbitant fees, Gallini somehow managed to run up a profit of £4000 in four seasons—though the money went to the theatre's innumerable creditors.

All along, rent from concerts continued to increase Gallini's personal fortune. In 1784, Gallini and Elizabeth bought the manors of Hampstead Norreys and Bothampstead from her brother Peregrine, followed in 1785 by the adjacent manor of Yattendon. He also acquired real estate abroad. Money probably also changed hands when he was awarded the knighthood of the Order of the Golden Spur by the pope in the spring of 1788. He was then popularly styled Sir John Gallini, but English society proved more willing to joke about the title than to recognize it.

The King's Theatre burnt down on 17 June 1789 during evening rehearsals, and the dancers fled the building as beams fell onto the stage. The fire had been deliberately set on the roof, and Gallini offered a reward of £300 for capture of the culprit. With the theatre destroyed, each group laid its own plans for a replacement. Although Gallini schemed to take full control of the business in a new space with a new partner, Robert Bray O'Reilly, by December he had broken away and joined forces with his nemesis William Taylor, who was rebuilding the old theatre. Defying the lord chamberlain, they reopened without a license in the spring of 1791, with Gallini responsible for artistic direction.

Joseph Haydn wrote an opera L'anima del filosofo for Gallini, but the performance was banned. The opera wasn't performed until the 20th century.

Despite the presence of Haydn, the great tenor Giacomo Davide, and the Vestris, father and son, the company lost £9700 in five months. Gallini thereafter dropped out of opera management and contented himself with teaching, at which he was recognized to be superb, and running Hanover Square. He probably lost very little on the new opera venture, since he did collect most of the money he was owed from Taylor.

== Death and legacy ==
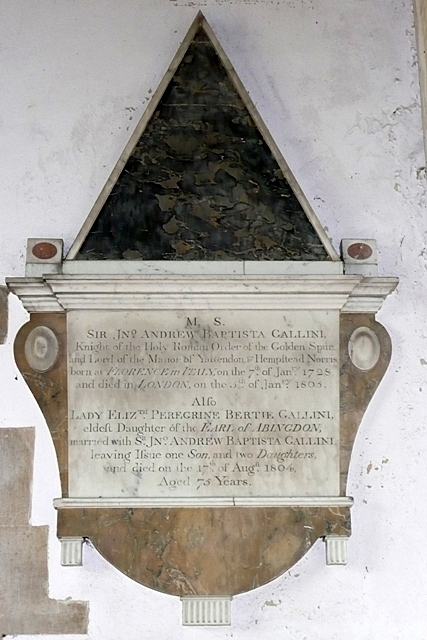
Memorial at St Peter and St Paul's church, Yattendon

He died abruptly at his home in Hanover Square on the morning of 5 January 1805 at the age of seventy-six, survived by his son John Andrea and two daughters, among whom an estate said to be £150,000 was divided. He was buried at St Peter and St Paul's church, Yattendon, Berkshire. Having sought his fortune in England in 1757, Gallini had led the opera ballet, taught a generation of aristocrats to dance and married one of them, made a substantial fortune as impresario of the chief concert venue in London, and proved to be one of the most successful opera managers of the eighteenth century.
