= Bernard Robinson (amateur musician) =

Bernard Wheeler Robinson (6 June 1904 – 7 July 1997) was a physicist on Ernest Rutherford's team at the Cavendish Laboratory in Cambridge, and an influential amateur musician, the founder of the annual Music Camp for amateurs.

== Career ==
Robinson was the son of the Baptist theologian Henry Wheeler Robinson. He studied mathematics and physics at Trinity College, Cambridge, and went on from there to work at the Cavendish Laboratory in the 1920s. After that he worked under Sir William Bragg at the Davy-Faraday Laboratory in London, working on X-ray crystallography. By the late 1930s Robinson was a senior lecturer at the Military College of Science, Woolwich. During the war he worked at the Royal Aircraft Establishment at Farnborough, and for two years at the Ministry of Aircraft Production. From 1945 he designed medical equipment at the Medical Research Council in Hampstead. In 1949 he moved to the National Physical Laboratory at Teddington until his retirement in 1964.

== Music Camp ==
An amateur violinist, Robinson was appointed conductor of the Royal Orchestral Society in 1932. He had already began organising gatherings of fellow amateur musicians from 1927, hiring the Poynders End village hall near Hitchin in Hertfordshire, with participants camping in the nearby fields. This led to his founding of the Bothampstead Music Camp in 1935, which continued annually at the farmland site in Berkshire for the next 30 years. The Chelsea Opera Group was founded at much the same time, and there was some overlap between the two amateur endeavours.

In 1966 Music Camp moved to Speen in Buckinghamshire. Many professional (or future professional) musicians participated in Music Camp over the years, including Dennis Brain, Colin Davis, John Gardner, Peter Pears, Roger Norrington and more. Over the years, the repertoire tackled became more ambitious. Beethoven symphonies were initially tackled, but by the 1980s campers were putting on their own Ring Cycle, and performing complex modern works such as Messiaen's Turangalila Symphony and Chronochromie.

By the 1980s Robinson had largely delegated the organisational work to others. In 1985 he wrote the book An Amateur in Music, expressing his conviction that the amateur is "the mainstay of music".

== Personal life ==
Robinson married the pianist Alice Dodds (nee Bradley-Moore) in 1933, and there was a son. After her death in 1958 he married again, to cellist, Elizabeth Orloff-Davidoff, daughter of Thomas Evelyn Scott-Ellis, 8th Baron Howard de Walden and Margherita van Raalt, on 31 October 1959. From 1963 they were living at Piggots, above High Wycombe, Eric Gill's former house.
