= Henry Peters (British politician) =

British politician

Henry Peters (c. 1763 – 21 December 1827) was the Member of Parliament for Oxford from May 1796 to 1802.

He was the second son of George Peters, a merchant in the Russia Company and was educated at Lincoln's Inn (1777) and St John's College, Cambridge.

He became a banker, partner in the firm of Masterman & Co., and served as a Director of the South Sea Company in 1790. He was backed for Parliament by a group in Oxford opposed to local aristocratic interests and sat as MP for Oxford from 1796 to 1802. He was appointed High Sheriff of Surrey for 1818–19.

He married Charlotte Mary, the daughter of Lt.-Gen. George Morrison of Sion Hill, nr. Barnet, Middlesex, with whom he had 5 sons and 5 daughters.

Parliament of Great Britain
Preceded by Francis Burton; Arthur Annesley	Member of Parliament for Oxford; 1796–1800; With: Francis Burton	Succeeded by Parliament of the United Kingdom
Parliament of the United Kingdom
Preceded by Parliament of Great Britain	Member of Parliament for Oxford; 1801–1802; With: Francis Burton	Succeeded by Francis Burton; John Atkyns-Wright
