= John Marsh (theologian) =

The Rev. Professor John Marsh CBE
- Born: 5 November 1904; Brighton, United Kingdom
- Died: 26 January 1994 (aged 89)
- Education: The Skinners' School, Tunbridge Wells
- Alma mater: University of Edinburgh, Mansfield College, Oxford
- Occupations: Christian minister, theologion, academic
- Children: 3

The Reverend Professor John Marsh CBE, MA, DPhil (5 November 1904 – 26 January 1994) was a theologian, Congregational (later United Reformed) minister and college principal. He was principal of Mansfield College, Oxford from 1953 to 1970 leading it during its transition to a permanent private hall of the University of Oxford.

== Early life ==
Marsh grew up in East Grinstead, West Sussex attending The Skinners' School in Tunbridge Wells. He went on to graduate in philosophy at Edinburgh University.

== Career ==
Marsh had various posts including the first Professor of Christian Theology at the University of Nottingham before being appointed principal at Mansfield College, Oxford in 1953 where he remained until 1970.

Marsh was involved in various aspects of the World Council of Churches and also the establishment of the United Reformed Church.

== Personal life ==
Marsh was married to Gladys Marsh for 59 years with whom he had three children.

== Selected works ==
Author

- The Fulness of Time (Nisbet and Co, 1952)
- The Significance of Evanston (London Independent Press, 1954)
- A Year with the Bible (S.C.M. Press, 1957)
- Amos and Micah (S.C.M. Press, 1959)
- Saint John (Pelican New Testament Commentaries) (Penguin, 1968)
- Jesus in His Lifetime (Sidgwick & Jackson, 1981) ISBN 978-0283986383

Co-editor

- Intercommunion : The Report of the Theological Commission Appointed by the Continuation Committee of the World Conference on Faith and Order, Together with a Selection from the Material Presented to the Commission (SCM Press, 1952) (co-editor with Baillie, D. M)
