= Mansfield College, Oxford =

College of the University of Oxford

Mansfield College
- University of Oxford
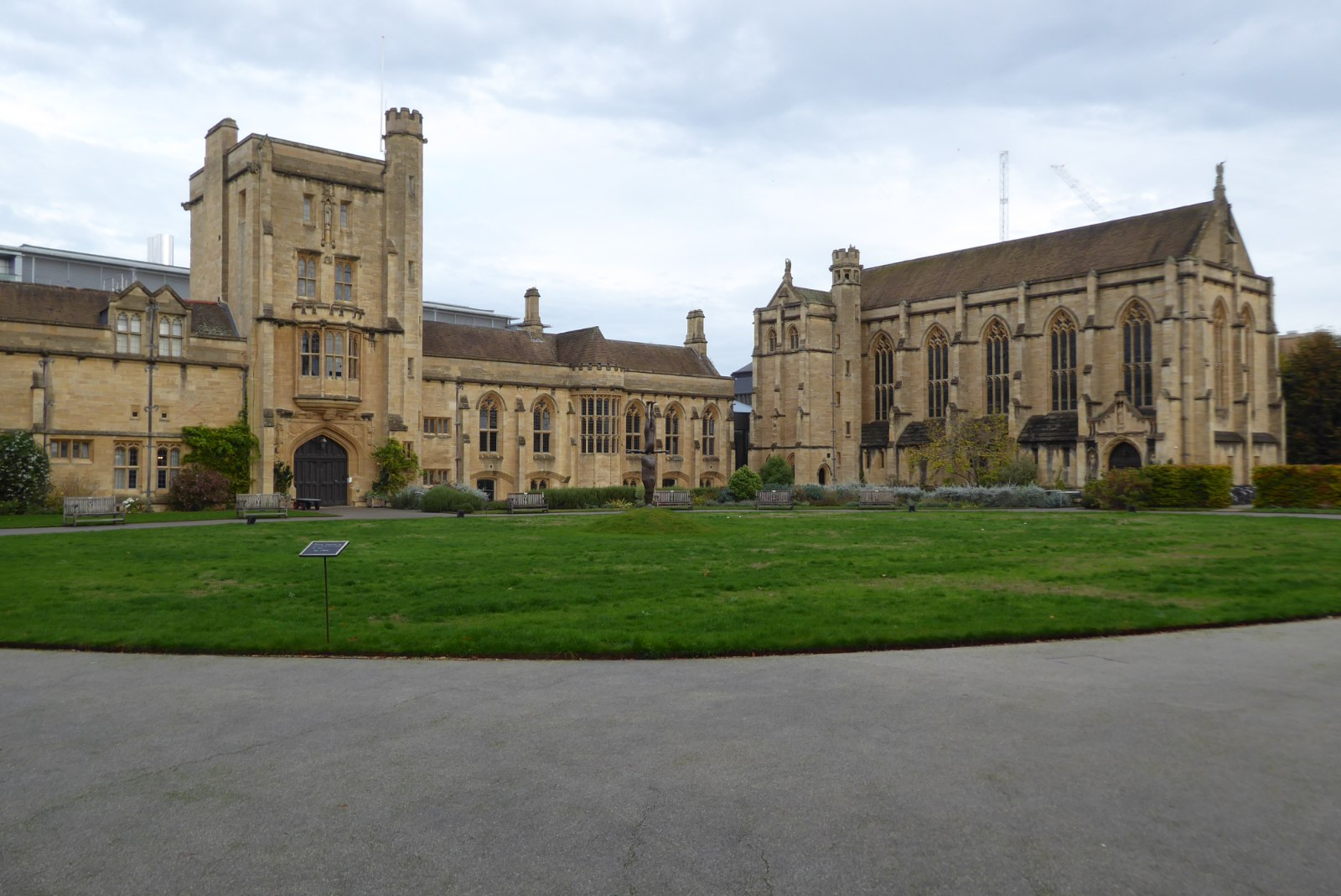
- Mansfield College Quadrangle

- Arms: Gules an open book inscribed DEUS LOCUTUS EST NOBIS IN FILIO in letters sable bound argent edged and clasped or between three cross crosslets or.
- Location: Mansfield Road
- Coordinates: 51.757428°N 1.252876°W
- Latin name: Collegium de Mansfield
- Motto: Nullius boni sine socio iucunda possessio est
- Motto in English: No blessing is truly joyful unless it is shared
- Established: 1838 as Spring Hill College; 1886 as Mansfield College
- Named for: George and Elizabeth Mansfield
- Architect: Basil Champneys
- Sister college: Homerton College, Cambridge
- Principal: Helen Mountfield
- Undergraduates: c.245 (2020–2021)
- Postgraduates: c.145
- Endowment: £32.7 million (2025)
- Website: www.mansfield.ox.ac.uk
- Boat club: Boatclub

Map
- Location within Oxford city centre

Mansfield College, Oxford is a constituent college of the University of Oxford in Oxford, England. The college was founded in Birmingham in 1838 as a college for Nonconformist students. It moved to Oxford in 1886 and was renamed Mansfield College after George Mansfield and his sister Elizabeth. In 1995 a royal charter was awarded giving the institution full college status. The college grounds are located on Mansfield Road, near the centre of Oxford.

As of December 2023, the college comprises approximately 245 undergraduates, 145 graduates and 40 visiting students. There are around 40 fellows.

Helen Mountfield, a barrister and legal scholar, has been the principal of the college since 2018.

== History ==
The college was founded in 1838, under the patronage of George Storer Mansfield (1764–1837) and his two sisters Sarah (1767–1853) and Elizabeth (1772–1847), as Spring Hill College, Birmingham, a college for Nonconformist students. In the nineteenth century, although students from all religious denominations were legally entitled to attend universities, they were forbidden by statute from taking degrees unless they conformed to the Church of England.

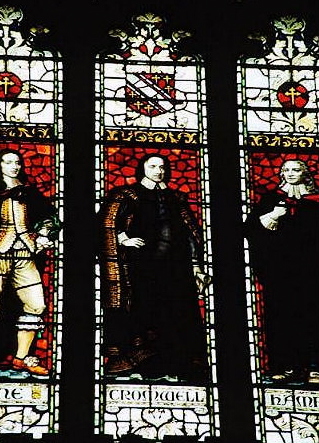
Stained glass window in the college chapel, L-R Sir Henry Vane, Oliver Cromwell and John Hampden

In 1871, the Universities Tests Act abolished all religious tests for non-theological degrees at Oxford, Cambridge and Durham Universities. For the first time the educational and social opportunities offered by Britain's premier institutions were open to some Nonconformists. The Prime Minister who enacted these reforms, William Ewart Gladstone, encouraged the creation of a Nonconformist college at Oxford.

Spring Hill College moved to Oxford in 1886 and was renamed Mansfield College after George Mansfield and his sister Elizabeth. The Victorian buildings, designed by Basil Champneys on a site bought from Merton College, were formally opened in October 1889.

Mansfield was the first Nonconformist college to open in Oxford. Initially the college accepted men only, the first woman (Constance Coltman) being admitted to read for an external degree in 1913.

During World War II, over forty members of staff from the Government Code and Cypher School moved to the college to work on British codes and cyphers.

Like many of Oxford's colleges, Mansfield admitted its first mixed-sex cohort in 1979, having previously not accepted women to read for Oxford degrees.

In 1955 the college was granted the status of permanent private hall within the University of Oxford and in 1995 a royal charter was awarded giving the institution full college status.

=== Nonconformist roots ===
Since the college was first formally integrated into the university structure in 1955, its Nonconformist aspects have gradually diminished. Until 2007 Mansfield trained United Reformed Church (URC) ordinands, who became fully matriculated members of the university and received degrees.

The Nonconformist history of the college is however still apparent in a few of its features. A portrait of Oliver Cromwell hangs in the Senior Common Room and portraits of the dissenters of 1662 hang in the library and the corridors of the main college building, together with portraits of Viscount Saye and Sele, John Hampden, Thomas Jollie and Hugh Peters. The college chapel is unconsecrated, and contains stained glass windows and statues depicting leading figures from Nonconformist movements, including Cromwell, Sir Henry Vane and William Penn. Chapel services are still conducted in a Nonconformist tradition. Over the years attendance at chapel services has declined and the make-up of the general student body no longer reflects the Nonconformist religious origins of the college.

== Grounds ==
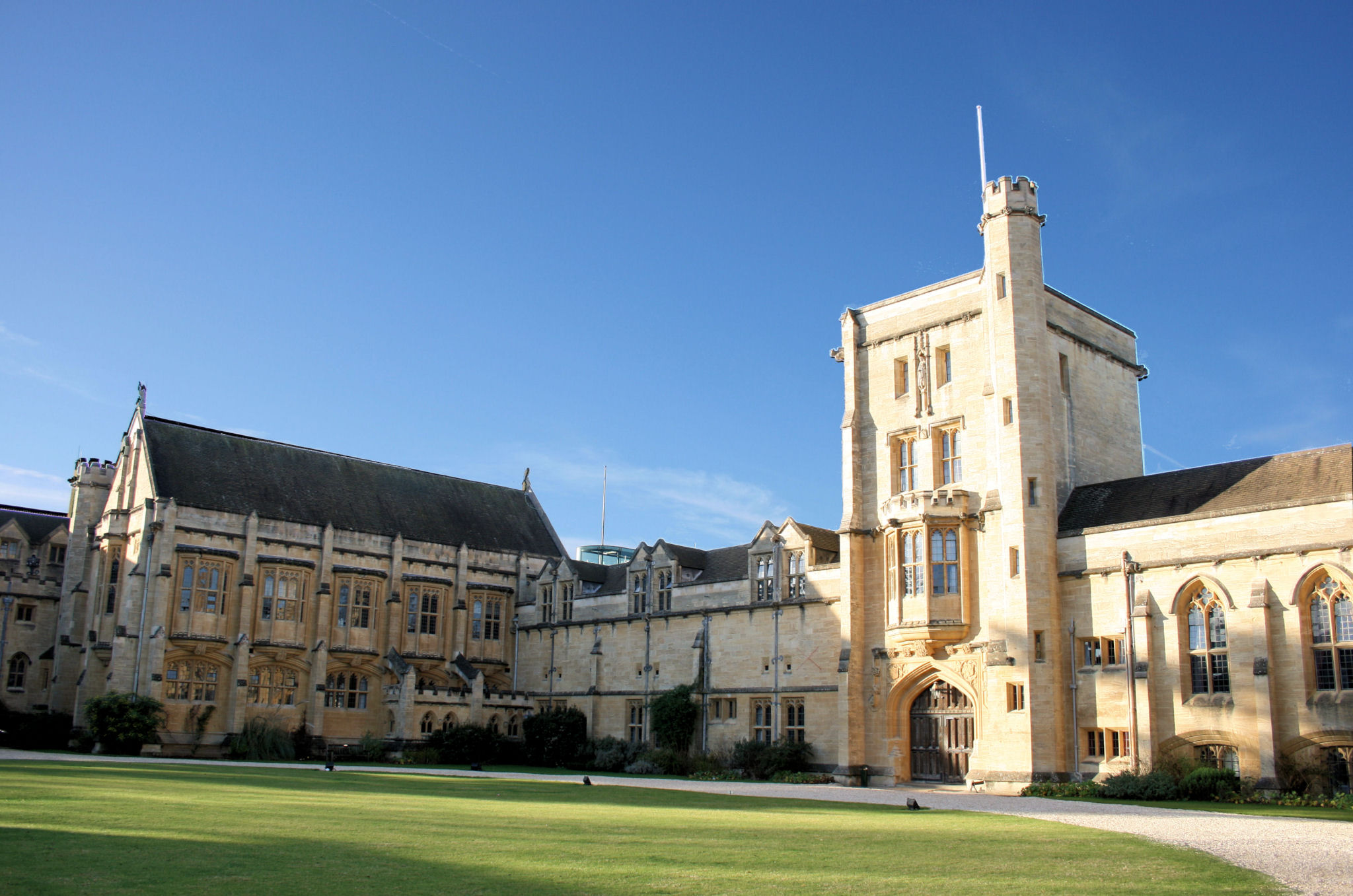
Mansfield College Main Building and JCR with Library on the left.

The grounds of Mansfield College are located on Mansfield Road, near the centre of Oxford, and to the south of the Science Area. The grounds are near the University Parks and the River Cherwell. The college shares a boundary wall with Wadham College.

=== Buildings ===
The main building was designed by architect Basil Champneys, and built between 1887 and 1889. It houses the main college library, the law library and the theology library. It is also home to the college's Junior Common Room, Middle Common Room, and Senior Common Room. The main college building encloses three sides of the large quadrangle, which has a circular lawn. The college also has several other buildings, primarily used for student accommodation, which are opposite the main building. Unusually, Mansfield College is not accessed via the porter's lodge, the college staff maintaining that this is representative of its open and non-conformist ethos. However, early outlines of schematics for the college show an enclosed second quadrangle behind the main building, with the front tower serving as a gatehouse into this area. However, the college's constituent poverty and lack of funds owing to its non-conformist history prevented these plans from being executed. What was planned to be a traditional style porter's lodge can still be found in the main building: on 1902 plans, the tiny room opening directly on to the entrance hall is labelled 'Porter'.

The latest addition to the college's facilities, the Hands Building, was designed by Rick Mather Architects and uses renewable energy sources. It incorporates 74 en-suite study bedrooms, seminar rooms and a 160-seat auditorium that will be used for lectures, as a cinema, moot court and performing arts space. It was nominated for the Royal Institute of British Architects South Regional Awards 2019.

== Academic performance ==
The Norrington Table is an annual ranking of the colleges of the University of Oxford by number and class of degrees awarded. In 2019 Mansfield ranked 5th out of 30 Colleges in the table. The university advises that due to the small number of degrees awarded the rankings should be treated with caution. Mansfield's academic performance, as reflected in the Norrington Table, is currently within the same 10% range as most of the other colleges.

== Student life ==
Mansfield College Boat Club and a number of other college organisations are popular amongst the students, achieving results competitive with the larger colleges. Many of the sports teams are "combined" in partnership with Merton College.

In Oxford tradition, Mansfield College holds regular formal dinners. These take place every Wednesday and Friday in the Chapel Hall.

Mansfield is known for placing emphasis on access, welfare and equality, with over 90% of students coming from a state school background. The college is recognized as a University College of Sanctuary by the UK charity City of Sanctuary, and has launched a fully-funded Sanctuary Scholarship.

== College grace ==
In 2011, Mansfield College adopted two distinct pre-supper graces, one religious and one non-religious, in an effort to be inclusive to persons of different faiths, or none.

Latin	English
Benedictus Benedicat	May the Blessed One Bless
Nullius boni sine socio iucunda possessio est	No good thing is truly joyful unless it is shared

Prior to 2011, the college used the following, specifically Christian grace, adopted in 1953, but originally used by the University College of North Wales, Bangor (now Bangor University):

Omnipotens Deus, clementissime Pater, omnis boni fons, in donis tuis gaudentes nomen tuum magnificamus, per Jesum Christum Dominum nostrum. Translated: Almighty God, Father of mercies and fount of every good, in the enjoyment of thy gifts we bless thy name, through Jesus Christ our Lord.

== People associated with Mansfield College ==
=== Principals ===
- 1886 to 1909: Andrew Martin Fairbairn; first principal of Mansfield College
- 1909 to 1932: William Boothby Selbie
- 1932 to 1953: Nathaniel Micklem
- 1953 to 1970: John Marsh
- 1970 to 1977: George Bradford Caird
- 1977 to 1986: Donald Armstrong Sykes
- 1986 to 1988: Jan Womer
- 1989 to 1996: Dennis John Trevelyan
- 1996 to 2002: David Marquand
- 2002 to 2011: Diana Walford
- 2011 to 2018: Helena Kennedy
- 2018 to date: Helen Mountfield

=== Staff and fellows ===
The theologian Albert Schweitzer was a special lecturer at the college and often performed on the chapel organ. The Rev. John Muddiman, G. B. Caird Fellow in New Testament Theology, and Michael Freeden, director of the Centre for Political Ideologies and founding editor of the Journal of Political Ideologies, are two recently retired (now emeritus) fellows of the college. Dame Jocelyn Bell Burnell, the British astrophysicist known for first discovering radio pulsars, is currently a visiting professor.

Honorary fellows of the college include Jimmy Carter, 39th President of the US; Shami Chakrabarti, former director of the civil rights group Liberty and chancellor of Oxford Brookes University; journalist and economist Will Hutton; politician Paddy Ashdown; actress Dame Maggie Smith; US senator Hillary Clinton; and barrister Helena Kennedy, Baroness Kennedy of The Shaws.

=== Notable alumni ===
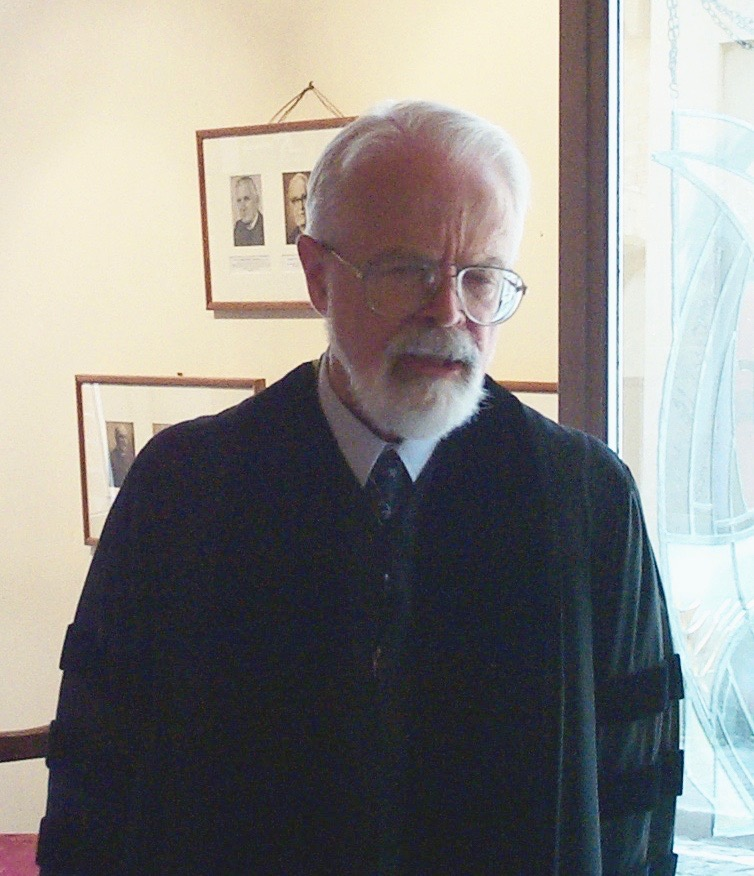
Robert Merrihew Adams, philosopher

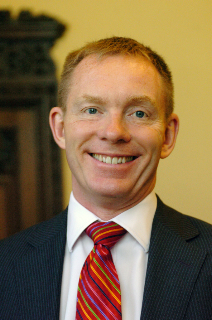
Sir Chris Bryant, MP

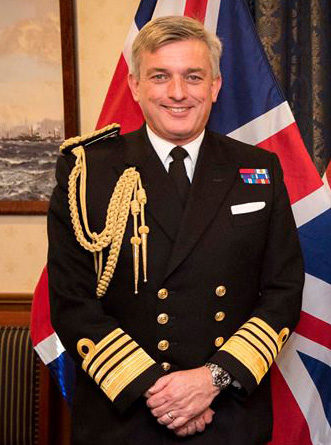
Sir Philip Jones, former First Sea Lord
- Robert Merrihew Adams, philosopher of religion
- Pamela Sue Anderson, philosopher
- Marcus Borg, US academic and theologian
- Sir Chris Bryant, MP
- G. B. Caird, biblical scholar, Senior Tutor, and Principal; later Dean Ireland's Professor of Exegesis of Holy Scripture at the University of Oxford.
- Luke Charters, MP
- Constance Coltman, one of the first women ordained to Christian ministry in Britain
- Paul Crossley, pianist
- Adam Curtis, BAFTA award-winning filmmaker, producer and writer
- Kwesi Dickson, academic, theologian, author and former President of Methodist Church Ghana
- James Dingemans, constitutional lawyer and prosecutor during the Hutton Inquiry
- C. H. Dodd, theologian, chairman of New English Bible translators
- Paul W. Fleming, trade union leader, General Secretary of Equity
- John Glen, politician
- Uri Gordon, anarchist writer and activist
- Colin Gunton, theologian
- Guy Hands, private equity investor, founder of Terra Firma Capital Partners
- Peter Hessler, US writer and journalist
- Charles Silvester Horne, MP, nonconformist author, hymn writer and preacher
- Lincoln Hurst, biblical scholar and film historian
- Sir Philip Jones, Royal Navy Officer, an Admiral, First Sea Lord
- R. Tudur Jones, Welsh nationalist and theologian
- Munira Mirza, former Head of the Policy Unit, 10 Downing Street
- Joe Morris, MP
- Joe Seddon, tech entrepreneur and CEO of Zero Gravity
- Michael Pollan, US author, journalist and activist
- Stephen Pollard, British author and journalist
- Cecil Pugh, GC, Royal Air Force chaplain and George Cross recipient
- H. Wheeler Robinson, Principal of Regent's Park College, Oxford and Old Testament scholar
- Sir Paul Ruddock, co-founder of Lansdowne Partners
- Erik Routley, composer and musicologist
- Justin Rowlatt, TV journalist
- Adam von Trott, member of the German resistance in World War II
- Amos Wilder, US poet and theologian
