= Lincoln Hurst =

American academic

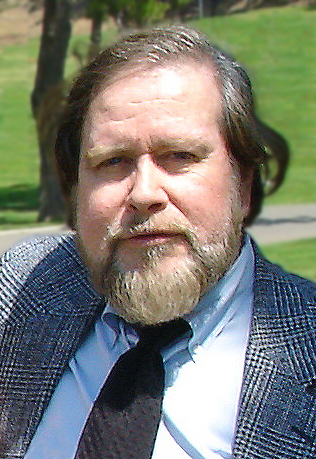
Lincoln Hurst (1946-2008) American biblical scholar and film historian

Lincoln Douglas Hurst (May 6, 1946 – November 11, 2008), also known as L. D. Hurst, was an American scholar of the Bible, religious history and film. He was Emeritus Professor at the University of California, Davis (1983–2006), and adjunct professor at Fuller Theological Seminary, Pasadena, California (1987–2008).

== Life and career ==
Hurst (r.) with the late G. B. Caird, Oxford, November, 1982.

Born in Chicago and raised in Arlington Heights, Illinois, Hurst graduated from Arlington High School, and later received the Bachelor of Arts degree in history from Trinity College (now Trinity International University), Deerfield, Illinois (1969). He was then granted the Master of Divinity (1973) and Master of Theology (1976) degrees from Princeton Theological Seminary (where he worked under the late Bruce M. Metzger) and the Doctor of Philosophy (1982) degree from Oxford University (Mansfield College), England, where he worked under the late G. B. Caird. Anglican Bishop N.T. Wright also did his doctoral work under Caird, and three years after Caird's death Hurst and Wright co-edited a volume in his memory. Hurst also acted as Caird's family-appointed literary executor, insofar as some of Caird's work was incomplete when he died.

Before taking up a post at the University of California, Davis in 1983, he was an instructor at Bloomfield College, New Jersey (1973–74), lecturer (1979–80) and junior dean (1980–81) at Mansfield College, Oxford, and visiting fellow at Princeton Theological Seminary (fall, 1982). He was a lifelong proponent of animal welfare. Committed to preserving the memories of G. B. Caird and Errol Flynn, he spent the final weeks of his life writing about the achievements of both men. Hurst died suddenly from a heart attack in November 2008.

== Areas of activity ==
=== Biblical studies ===
Having written extensively on the Epistle to the Hebrews, Hurst's work also focused on a variety of other topics, including ethics in religion, the Aramaic language of the Gospels and Acts, the Dead Sea Scrolls, the development of early Christian thought about Jesus, New Testament Theology, and the relationship of religion and film. His work had a maverick tendency, with a willingness to take up unorthodox positions. His discussion of Hebrews (Hurst 1990) accordingly is unconcerned about the identity of the unknown author - a common preoccupation - but is rather directed at uncovering the particular religious milieu out of which he or she came. He argued that the author was not a disciple of either Plato or Philo, or that he was a former member of the Qumran community - prevailing views for much of the twentieth century - but rather was a mainstream first century Christian who was heavily influenced by Paul the Apostle and the Jewish Apocalyptic tradition. He also maintained, against virtually all scholars and commentators, that the first chapter of Hebrews is designed to illustrate not the deity of Christ, but his perfect humanity. The first-century writer wishes his readers to know that in Jesus God has restored the human race to its proper predestined place "above the angels" (Psalm 8:4-6; Hurst 1987). His interest in the question of the Historical Jesus led him to question the linguistic techniques by which the majority of scholars have attempted to reconstruct Jesus's original Aramaic words beneath the later Greek gospels (Hurst 1986). The ethical dimensions of Jesus's teaching is another area into which he delved; considering Jesus's ethics to be indissolubly linked to Realized eschatology - the idea (associated with C. H. Dodd) that for Jesus the Kingdom of God had already, in substantial form, arrived in the teaching, life, and death of Jesus (Hurst 1992). A central facet of Christian doctrine since the early centuries of the church has been the Pre-existence of Christ, and this was another area that attracted his attention.

His claim (following G. B. Caird) that Paul the Apostle represents both the earliest and the highest thinking about Jesus in the New Testament (as opposed, for instance, to the Gospel of John) runs counter to the view of the majority of scholars, and in this case he had a notable disagreement with University of Durham theology Professor James Dunn (Hurst, 1986); he and Dunn appeared in the same volume "discussing" the question (Martin and Dodd, 1998). Hurst's interest in the subject of New Testament Theology, sparked by his posthumous completion of G. B. Caird's work of that title, remained a continuing thrust of his research. The messianism of the Dead Sea Scrolls has been widely discussed during the past sixty years in western religious circles; here it has been almost a dogma among scholars that the members of the Qumran community were idiosyncratic in that they expected not one, but two Messiahs. Hurst stood against this idea, claiming that the members of the desert sect held a thoroughly orthodox Jewish belief in one Messiah (Hurst 1999) (there is little evidence that this argument has had any impact on the field). He also explored the influence of Christianity in general, and the Bible in particular, on the films of the twentieth and twenty-first centuries - especially those that use the Bible symbolically in "modern" settings (Hurst 2004).

=== Film History ===
In addition to studies in religion and the Bible, Hurst maintained a long interest in the history of film. For most of his life he studied cinema as an avocation, but in his later years it consumed an increasing amount of his time. For approximately ten years he taught a popular course on film at the University of California, Davis, where his work considered the relationship of film and music and of film and religion. He was an accredited film historian, having appeared in many documentary features on DVD and television, including Britain (BBC) and Australia (ABC), dealing with various aspects of some of the most significant films in American cinematic history. He displayed a special fondness for crime films, having publicly commented on three of what he considered (in addition to The Godfather trilogy) to be among the most historically crucial: Angels with Dirty Faces, The Roaring Twenties and (most significantly) White Heat.

He is seen notably in features accompanying the Warner Brothers DVD releases of the classic 1941 release of "The Maltese Falcon", and in various 'signature collection' DVDs, including those of Humphrey Bogart and Errol Flynn, featuring on the commentaries alongside Martin Scorsese, Eric Lax, Michael Madsen, and Theresa Russell among others. In 2005 he recorded a full-length audio commentary for the Warner Home Video DVD release of the 1939 classic James Cagney crime film, The Roaring Twenties, included in "The Warner Gangsters Collection".

== Selected works ==
=== Books ===
- (with N. T. Wright, ed.), The Glory of Christ in the New Testament: Studies in Christology in Memory of George Bradford Caird. Oxford: Clarendon Press, Oxford, 1987.
- The Epistle to the Hebrews: Its Background of Thought. SNTS Monograph Series No. 65. Cambridge: Cambridge University Press, 1990.
- New Testament Theology, by G. B. Caird, Completed and Edited by L. D. Hurst. Oxford and New York: Oxford University Press, 1994 (Paperback 1995).
- Swashbuckler at the Front: Errol Flynn, the Spanish Civil War, Religion, and Fascism. Lanham, MD: Scarecrow Press (forthcoming).

=== Articles & Essays ===
- "How 'Platonic' are Hebrews viii.5 and ix.23ff.?", Journal of Theological Studies n.s. 34 (1983), pp. 156ff.
- "Eschatology and 'Platonism' in the Epistle to the Hebrews," Society of Biblical Literature Seminar Papers 23, Chico (1984), pp. 41ff.
- "Apollos, Hebrews and Corinth: Bishop Montefiore's Theory Examined," Scottish Journal of Theology 38 (1986), pp. 505ff.
- "The Christology of Hebrews 1 and 2," in Hurst and Wright (eds.), The Glory of Christ in the New Testament (see above), pp. 151ff.
- "The Ethics of Jesus," in Joel B. Green, Scot McKnight, and I. Howard Marshall (eds.), Dictionary of Jesus and the Gospels. Downers Grove: InterVarsity, 1992, pp. 210ff.
- "The Neglected Role of Semantics in the Search for the Aramaic Words of Jesus," Journal for the Study of the New Testament 28 (1986), pp. 63ff. (reprinted in Craig A. Evans and Stanley E. Porter [eds.], The Historical Jesus: A Sheffield Reader. Sheffield: Sheffield Academic Press, 1995, pp. 219ff.)
- "New Testament Theological Analysis," Introducing New Testament Interpretation, ed. Scot McKnight (Grand Rapids, MI: Baker Books, 1989), pp. 133–161.
- "Priest, High Priest," in Ralph P. Martin and Peter H. Davids (eds.), Dictionary of the Later New Testament and Its Developments. Downers Grove: InterVarsity, 1997, pp. 963ff.
- (with Joel B. Green), "Priest, Priesthood," in Joel B. Green, Scot McKnight, and I. Howard Marshall (eds.), Dictionary of Jesus and the Gospels. Downers Grove: InterVarsity, 1992, pp. 633ff.
- "Qumran," in Ralph P. Martin and Peter H. Davids (eds.), Dictionary of the Later New Testament and Its Developments. Downers Grove: InterVarsity, 1997, pp. 997ff.
- "Re-Enter the Pre-Existent Christ in Philippians 2.5-11?", New Testament Studies 32 (1986), pp. 449ff. (reprinted, with new material, as "Christ, Adam, and Pre-Existence Revisited," in Ralph P. Martin and Brian Dodd (eds.), Where Christology Began. Louisville, Ky.: Westminster/John Knox, 1998), pp. 84ff.
- "George Bradford Caird," A Historical Handbook of Major Biblical Interpreters, ed. Donald McKim (Downers Grove, Il: Intervarsity, 1998), 456–462.
- "Did Qumran Expect Two Messiahs?", Bulletin of Biblical Research 9 (1999), pp. 157ff.
- "Foreword," G. B. Caird, Principalities and Powers. Eugene, Or: Wipf and Stock, 2003, pp. 1–9.
- "Six-Gun Savior: George Stevens' 'Shane' and Paul's Letter to the Romans," in Sheila E. McGinn (ed.), Celebrating Romans: Template for Pauline Theology. Essays in Honor of Robert Jewett. Grand Rapids: Eerdmans, 2004, pp. 240ff.
