= Corporate personality =

Concept in Christian theology

Corporate personality is a concept in Christian theology that was articulated by H. Wheeler Robinson. As originally formulated, it dealt with areas of the Old Testament where the relationships between individuals and the groups that they were part of were treated. For example, Achan's family was (at least in some interpretations of the text) collectively punished for a sin that is viewed as primarily Achan's alone. It has since fallen out of favour with theologians, who now favour other interpretations of the Old Testament. However, some theologians still use the idea, construed in a more narrow sense, to explain the use of "ἐν" for "in Christ" (amongst others) in the New Testament writings of Paul the Apostle.

The notion of Old Testament corporate personality encompasses four things:

identification
Individuals are never considered to be isolated from the groups that they belong to, and are often treated as representatives for, or even as wholly identified with, those groups.
extension
The boundaries of the individual are extended to additionally encompass other people that belong to that individual. This extension can be both in space, from a king to a kingdom, and in time, from a parent to his descendants. Examples of extension include Achan (mentioned earlier), Korah (Izhar's son), and David, where a leader is punished or rewarded by punishing or rewarding those whom he leads.
realism
The relationship between the group and the individual is a real one.
oscillation
There exists an oscillation back and forth between the group and the individual.

In Pauline theology, the notion of corporate personality is largely restricted to its representational aspect. Paul's comparison between Jesus Christ and Adam is viewed, by those theologians that adhere to the notion, as an identification of Christ as the king and those people in the kingdom that he leads. Similarly, in his Epistle to the Galatians, Paul speaks of Gentiles being blessed both "in" Abraham^{1} and also "with" him—which these theologians hold to be another example of corporate personality in Paul's writings.

== See also ==
- Collective responsibility

== Footnotes ==
- ^1 "in thee" is the KJV translation of the Greek. The NIV uses the English translation "through you" for "ἐν σοι", on the basis that Paul is directly quoting the promise to Abraham in Genesis 12:3, whose original Hebrew preposition "be" (which was translated to "ἐν" in the Septuagint) is more accurately translated in the instrumental sense of "by means of". Hence "through" rather than "in".
