= The Journal of Theological Studies =

- Discipline: Theology
- Language: English
- Edited by: Graham Gould, Katharine Dell

Publication details
- History: 1899–present
- Publisher: Oxford University Press (United Kingdom)
- Frequency: Biannually

Standard abbreviations
- ISO 4: J. Theol. Stud.

Indexing
- ISSN: 0022-5185 (print); 1477-4607 (web)

Links
- Journal homepage

The Journal of Theological Studies is an academic journal established in 1899 and now published by Oxford University Press in April and October each year. It publishes theological research, scholarship, and interpretation, and hitherto unpublished ancient and modern texts, inscriptions, and documents. Volumes I to L (the Old Series) span 1899 to 1949, while volumes 1 to 71 (the New Series) span 1950 to 2020.

As of 2020, the editors are Graham Gould, who oversees the articles and book reviews in non-biblical fields of study (including patristics, church history, and systematic theology), and Katharine Dell (Reader in Old Testament Literature and Theology, Faculty of Divinity, University of Cambridge and Fellow of St Catharine's College), who oversees articles and book reviews in biblical studies and closely related fields; Dr Courtney Friesen of the University of Arizona is assistant editor.

Previous editors have included the patristic scholars James Bethune-Baker (1904–35), Henry Chadwick (1954–85), and Maurice Wiles (1986–99), and the biblical scholars R. H. Lightfoot (1940–53), Hedley F. D. Sparks (1953–77), G. B. Caird (1978–84), Morna Hooker (1985–2005), John Barton (2006–10), and John Muddiman (2011–12).

== See also ==
- List of theological journals
