= G. B. Caird =

British theologian, biblical scholar and Congregational minister (1917–1984)

G. B. Caird FBA
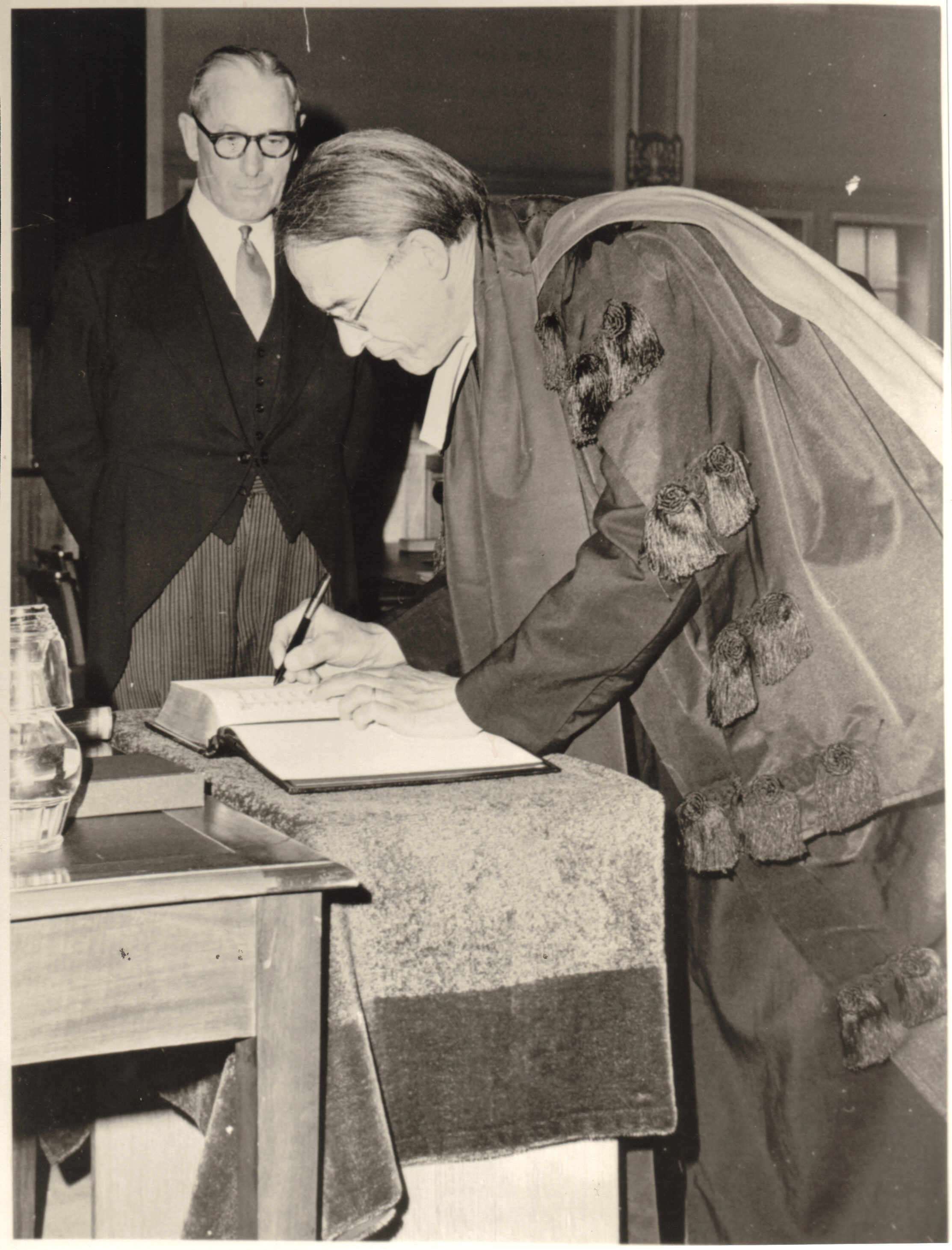
- Caird in 1977
- Born: George Bradford Caird; 17 July 1917; Wandsworth, London, England
- Died: 21 April 1984 (aged 66); Oxford, England
- Education: Peterhouse, Cambridge; Mansfield College, Oxford
- Occupation: Academic
- Notable work: The Language and Imagery of the Bible (1980)
- Title: Professor at University of Oxford
- Spouse: Viola Mary Newport
- Children: 4, including John
- Relatives: Eliza Doolittle (granddaughter)
- Religion: Christian
- Denomination: Congregationalist/United Reformed
- Theological work
- Era: Twentieth century
- Tradition or movement: Congregationalist
- Main interests: Biblical metaphor, imagery and language; New Testament theology; eschatology

George Bradford Caird FBA (17 July 1917 – 21 April 1984), known as G. B. Caird, was a British theologian, biblical scholar and Congregational minister. At the time of his death he was Dean Ireland's Professor of the Exegesis of Holy Scripture at the University of Oxford.

== Life and career ==
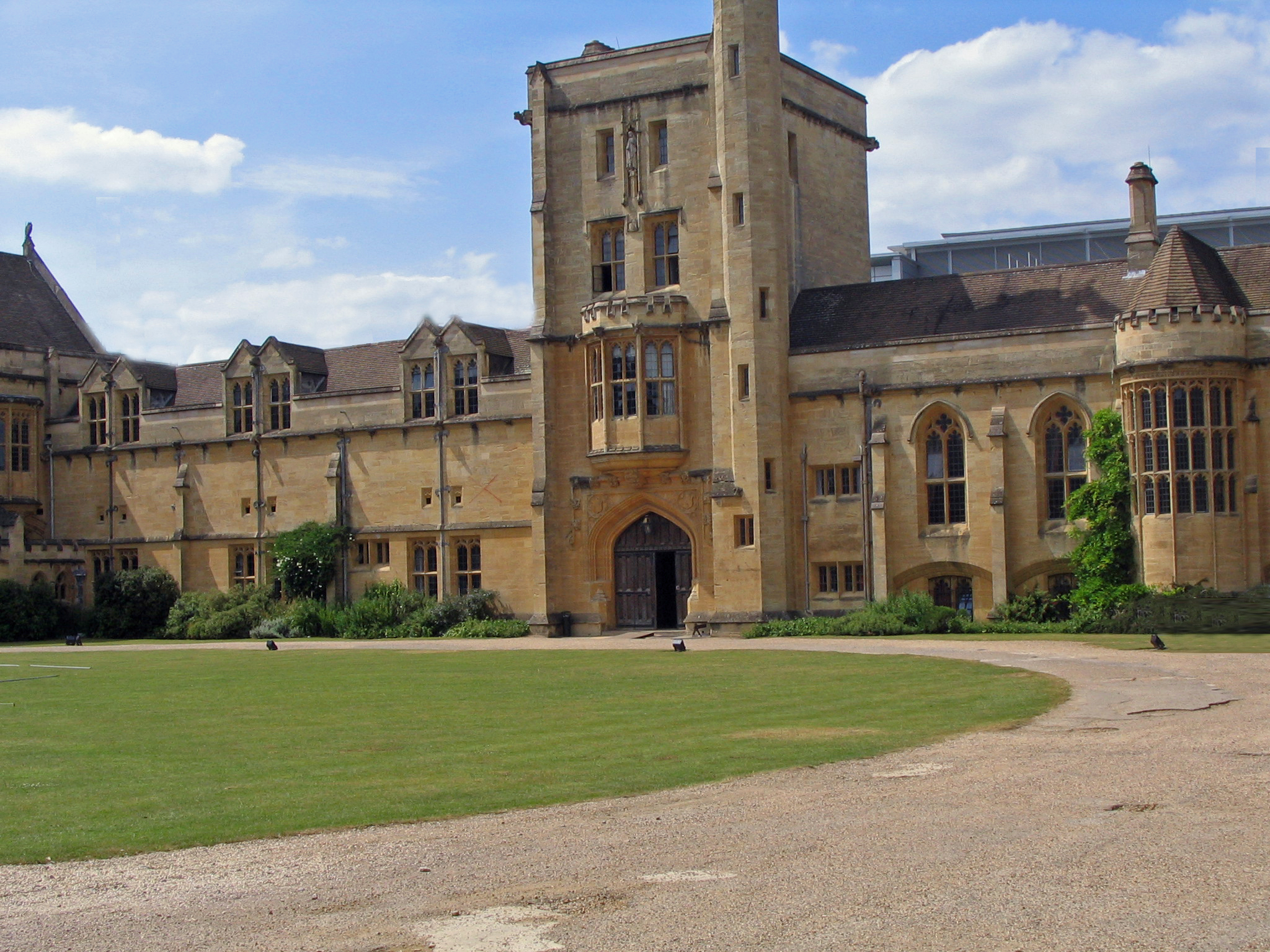
Mansfield College, Oxford: main entrance

Born in Wandsworth, London, England to parents from Dundee, Scotland, George Caird spent his early years in Birmingham, England, where his father was a construction engineer, and where he attended King Edward's School. His university education began at Peterhouse, Cambridge, where, in 1939, he received the B.A. with First-Class Honours in both parts of the Classical Tripos, and distinction in Greek and Latin verse (M.A. 1943). He then left Cambridge to train for the Congregational ministry and study theology at Mansfield College, Oxford. In 1944 he was granted the Oxford D.Phil. for his thesis "The New Testament Conception of Doxa (Glory)".

In 1943 he was appointed minister of Highgate Congregational Church in London. In 1945 he married Viola Mary Newport, known to all as 'Mollie' whom he had met while at Oxford and in 1946 they moved to Canada when he accepted the post of Professor of Old Testament at St. Stephen's College, Edmonton, Alberta. In 1950 he was appointed Professor of New Testament at McGill University, Montreal and, from 1955 was also the Principal of the United Theological College there.

Caird returned to Oxford in 1959, where he worked as Principal of Mansfield College from 1970 to 1977 after serving as Senior Tutor under John Marsh. Because he was non-Church of England, and because Mansfield was still a permanent private hall and had not yet achieved status as a constituent college of the university (see Colleges of the University of Oxford) during this period (1969–1977), Caird was barred from holding an official university lectureship. However, as a compensation he was granted the honorary position of Reader (academic rank) in Biblical Studies, a status somewhere between Senior Lecturer and Professor. And whenever he lectured on the New Testament at Mansfield, students from all over the university came and filled the large lecture hall to capacity. According to Henry Chadwick, "He lectured as he preached, almost always without a note ... with nothing before him but a Greek New Testament, usually upside down, for he knew the text by heart".

In 1975-1976 Caird took on almost full-time administration, serving as Moderator of the United Reformed Church, for which he had already served as its nominee as an invited 'observer' at the Second Vatican Council 1962–65. During his tenure as Moderator he made official visits to various parts of the world including South Africa, Israel and New Zealand. His work in the fields of Old and New Testament (he remains one of the few modern biblical interpreters to have held chairs in both) led to three honorary doctorates as well as the earned Oxford D.D., election to the British Academy (and the granting of its Burkitt Medal for Biblical Studies), and appointment to be the Dean Ireland's Professor and Professorial Fellow at The Queen's College, Oxford. But acceptance of the Dean Ireland's post was not automatic for Caird, according to Mansfield College historian Elaine Kaye. "Although he had been allowed to hold his honorary University post as Reader along with the Principalship of Mansfield, the University was not prepared to allow him to hold this more senior post jointly with Mansfield. It was at once a blow and an honour for the College. For Caird it may have been a difficult decision; but his final choice indicates that the opportunity to spend the remaining years of his career as a scholar and a teacher, rather than an administrator-cum-teacher, was to him, welcome".

In 1980 he won the Collins Religious Book Award for his work The Language and Imagery of the Bible. His final years involved biblical translation as a member of the translation panel of The Revised English Bible, as previously he had been a translator of The New English Bible's Apocrypha. He also co-edited (with Henry Chadwick ) Oxford's The Journal of Theological Studies from 1977 to 1984. In his lifetime he wrote nearly sixty articles, over a hundred book reviews, and six books. Following his resignation as Principal of Mansfield and his taking up of the Dean Ireland's chair, the Cairds left Oxford and moved into the sixteenth century thatched-roof "Brook Cottage" at Letcombe Regis, next to Wantage, Oxfordshire, seventeen miles south-west of Oxford. There they converted the cottage's back storeroom into "the Dusty" - a study for Caird to write in during his imminent retirement; it was there that he was working on his seventh major work, New Testament Theology, when he was felled by a heart attack on Easter Eve, 1984. His funeral was held in Mansfield College Chapel on 28 April, with Principal Donald Sykes delivering the eulogy; a memorial celebration was later conducted (13 October) in The University Church of St. Mary the Virgin, Oxford, with his close friend Henry Chadwick delivering the address.

A Festschrift was at the time in the works, which was subsequently converted into a memorial volume, The Glory of Christ in the New Testament: Studies in Christology in Memory of George Bradford Caird, edited by two of his students, Lincoln Hurst (L. D. Hurst) and Tom Wright (N. T. Wright), and published by Oxford University Press in late 1987.

Shortly after his death, some quick decisions needed to be made, particularly that involving his half-completed New Testament Theology; accordingly, Hurst was appointed Caird's Literary Executor. In addition, his children (see below) set up a foundation, The G. B. Caird Memorial Trust, the proceeds from which might enable (successfully, as it turned out) a new senior position to be set up in his name at Mansfield College: the G. B. Caird Fellow in New Testament Theology. It is currently occupied by Professor Jennifer Strawbridge.

Caird's academic legacy is also seen in that during the course of his career he taught numerous people who went on to garner serious scholarly attention. These include Marcus Borg, Colin Gunton, Lincoln Hurst, David P. Moessner, John Muddiman, Allison Trites, Francis Watson, and N. T. Wright. According to British Old Testament scholar James Barr, Caird was sometimes "practically adored" by students.

The Cairds with Robert Graves (r.), author of "I Claudius." Graves was Professor of Poetry at Oxford; Mollie Caird was an accomplished poet with two volumes of published verse to her credit

While to some Caird could appear austere, even intimidating, "he was in fact full of fun and humour". In his leisure time he enjoyed (most famously) bird-watching, croquet, snooker, music, theatre, reading mysteries, ping pong, chess, and all forms of puzzles — especially the crossword and jigsaw varieties. Music in particular occupied his time: it "was important to him, and he wrote several hymns, some of which were included within standard hymnals such as Congregational Praise and Hymns Ancient and Modern". He and Mollie had four children: James, Margaret (Meg) Laing, John, and George (Geordie). To Caird the home was never just a house: it was a bastion of the family - a center of games, poetry, music, and other cultural activity, where he was, according to Henry Chadwick, "sublimely happy ... it was a microcosm of vigorous debate and breathtaking wit, sparkling with his wife and his three sons and his daughter, whose gifts were a source of deep joy for him. From Mollie he caught his love for bird-watching, and from his children he loved to learn about architecture [James], drama [John], music [Geordie], and medieval philology [Meg]". Also, "no picture of George would be right which omitted his intense affection for his grandchildren."

== Major works ==
Inside Mansfield College Chapel, where Caird often preached. Over the years others who preached there included Albert Schweitzer (who also played the organ), C. H. Dodd, Harold Wilson, C. S. Lewis, Michael Ramsey, Henry Chadwick, William Barclay, Erik Routley, and John A. T. Robinson

Caird's earliest published book, The Truth of the Gospel (1950), is a brief but intense defence of the Christian faith. Some feel that, in terms of its stated purpose, it is more successful than C.S. Lewis's much more vaunted apologetic work Mere Christianity. In 1954 he produced his first sustained work of exegetical scholarship, the treatment of 1 and 2 Samuel in The Interpreter's Bible. His second book, The Apostolic Age (1955), is a succinct historical study of the early church to the end of the first century. Principalities and Powers (1956), while presumably a discussion of one theme of Paul's theology, is actually a summary of that theology on a variety of topics. Caird's first sustained independent commentary, The Gospel of St. Luke, was, as with his previous treatment of 1 and 2 Samuel, full of historical confidence: some reservations notwithstanding, the Old and New Testament writers left behind them sound history. His second commentary, The Revelation of St. John the Divine, resulted in his being awarded the Oxford D.D. Paul's Letters from Prison is a discussion of Colossians, Ephesians, Philippians and Philemon. As usual, Caird's maverick tendencies bubbled to the surface, and produced relatively conservative results in the face of the prevailing mainstream skepticism about the nature and extent of the Pauline writings: Paul, the writer of Colossians and Ephesians, provided wise and far-reaching insights into the universal human experience that will be ignored today at society's peril. The Language and Imagery of the Bible (1980) examined the literary techniques and meanings of the biblical authors.

In addition to these major works Caird provided a number of shorter studies on numerous topics: Septuagintal lexicography (e.g. "Towards a Lexicon of the Septuagint," 1969); the Christian's attitude to war (War and the Christian, 1979; Caird was a lifelong but undemonstrating pacifist) and Apartheid (South Africa: Reflections on a Visit, 1976). Toward the end of his career he was commissioned to write a number of books, including the New International Critical Commentary on The Epistle to the Hebrews and the volume on Paul in OUP's Past Masters series. But these were to take a back seat to his New Testament Theology, intended to be the ultimate statement of his thinking on the New Testament, and on which he had been working for some years. While he did not live to see it finished, it was edited and completed by Lincoln Hurst and published posthumously by the OUP in 1994 (hardback) and 1995 (paperback).

== Significance ==
=== Literary values ===
According to two of his students, what marked out all of Caird's work was an erudite, crisp writing style, a wry humour, and an ability to turn old questions on their heads by posing them in new and memorable ways. "Combining a penetrative knowledge of both Testaments with a rare fastidiousness with words, Caird analysed his texts in a way which for many set a new standard for the field. These traits, coupled with a fertility of imagination and an almost poetic approach to complex theological issues, produced a potent brew which any who took even a small draught were not likely to forget"." His literary ability was outstanding . . . his clear, crisp sentences say more in a few words than some scholars manage in several pages. A slim volume from Caird, easily mistaken for a slight or negligible work, is likely to be an explosive charge, packed with pithy wisdom".

=== Workings of language ===
Caird at a meeting of the Oxford Theology Faculty, 1972. Over the years he helped to guide the university through many changes in the curriculum, including the creation of the Certificate in Theology. This allowed an alternative to the Honour School of Theology for those who wished to pursue the Oxford educational experience

Caird lecturing to the North American Summer sessions, Mansfield College, Oxford, 1975. During the academic year students from colleges across Oxford flocked to hear him discourse on virtually any subject. As Henry Chadwick remarked, "He lectured as he preached, almost always without a note . . . with nothing before him but a Greek New Testament, usually upside down, for he knew the text by heart"

Caird had what seemed to be a bewildering array of interests. Ultimately, however, it was all of a piece: the unifying thread was the variety of ways in which language works. According to N.T. Wright, he loved words, and how human beings enjoy using and abusing them. This is demonstrated, e.g., by his early attraction to Septuagintal lexicography, or his analysis of The Language and Imagery of the Bible. In the latter Caird explored, among many other concerns, the rich variety of metaphor and imagery used by the biblical writers to convey their meanings. Going against much of the modern grain, he insisted that the Old and New Testament writers must be permitted to speak with their own voices and that modern vogues, presuppositions and dogmatic biases must not be permitted to get in the way. He particularly detested recent linguistic theories such as Structuralism, which he saw as sheer lunacy; it was among the "Gaderene precipitations into the Dark Ages". He "believed in the perspicuity of the substance of Holy Scripture, a principle which the medieval schoolmen and the Reformation inherited from St. Augustine, but which the disciples of Rudolf Bultmann have found it notoriously hard to share". Those who read or heard him were well aware that Caird thought British biblical scholarship (that of Dodd in particular) was the last word on the subject, and he found nothing more satisfying than a good joust with German theology. In this regard for over thirty years Bultmann remained his favorite target. Caird's focus on linguistics also inevitably led him into the area of Biblical translation. According to James Barr, since Caird was out of the country at the time, he was unable to contribute to the translation of the New English Bible (begun by his mentor C. H. Dodd in 1946, the year Caird moved to Canada); but he returned to England in time to serve (along with his close friend and colleague C. F. D. Moule) on the translation panel of the New English Bible's Apocrypha in 1961. Caird's views on translation were stated strongly and precisely in almost all of his works, including his articles dealing with the Septuagint and in The Language and Imagery of the Bible. He railed against the "word substitution" method, which he maintained tried to be faithful to the original Hebrew and Greek syntax and vocabulary, but sacrificed intelligibility in English. A frequent target of his wrath in this regard was the Revised Standard Version, which he saw as too wooden literal at crucial points. Caird advocated the "Dynamic equivalence" approach, promoted by, among others, Eugene Nida, wherein "one has to reproduce, not the words of the form of the original, but the meaning of the original as a whole. The New English Bible, according to Caird, was not only the first officially sponsored translation of this kind, but also 'incomparably the best'". To his delight Caird was able to contribute to the translation panel of the Revised English Bible in the last decade of his life, although he died before his work on that project was able to be brought to completion.

=== New Testament theology ===
Caird's overall conception of New Testament thought is seen in his synthetic New Testament Theology, which for him involved presiding over "an apostolic conference on faith and order" (cf. Acts, Gal 2). Here he attempted to allow the New Testament writers "to speak for themselves" on a wide variety of topics (predestination, sin, salvation, the life of the church, eschatology, christology). He avoided using any form of artificial force to press their viewpoints into the arbitrary strictures of a system. The consequent unison of Caird's New Testament conference was therefore similar to that of a choir, sung not in complete harmony but with proper counter-melodies. Yet another integral feature of New Testament Theology was his inclusion as the final chapter of a discussion of the theology of Jesus. For him this was "the starting point and goal of New Testament theology". Although New Testament Theology was published posthumously, Caird's effort had a visible and immediate impact on both sides of the Atlantic. According to Bruce Metzger of Princeton Theological Seminary, it was "vintage Caird" - "a weighty volume whose pages instruct as well as stimulate". John Muddiman, G. B. Caird Fellow in New Testament Theology at Mansfield College, Oxford, saw it as "a tangible monument to the scholarly achievement of George Caird". And, according to C. F. D. Moule of Cambridge, Caird's final work is "a very important book," "brilliant and provocative"; it causes the New Testament "to speak for itself by exact scrutiny and deft interrogation and with a sensitive awareness of the hazards of bridging the time-gap; and the results are fresh and radical".

=== Historical Jesus ===
Caird's career-long preoccupation with the Historical Jesus, known from his commentary on The Gospel of St. Luke and showcased at the end of New Testament Theology, is also reflected in his shorter works Jesus and the Jewish Nation and "Eschatology and Politics: Some Misconceptions," among others. Jesus and the Jewish Nation was one of the groundbreaking works that facilitated a new phase in the study of the subject, according to N. T. Wright, whose book Jesus and the Victory of God is built much on foundations laid by Caird. As with other New Testament specialists who had a strong classical training, Caird was baffled by the skepticism with which gospel commentators and others who write on the Jesus of history have traditionally looked upon their historical sources. Consequently, his work has a refreshing lack of negative presuppositions. As with his teacher C. H. Dodd, he was adamant that the gospels were reliable witnesses not only to the theology of the early church but to the theology of Jesus himself. His claim in particular that Jesus's friction with the Pharisees reflected a legitimate, contemporary, first-century Palestinian debate about "what it means for the nation of Israel to be the holy people of God in a world overrun by gentiles," and that this is profoundly "political," is fundamental to his work on Jesus.

=== Paul the Apostle ===
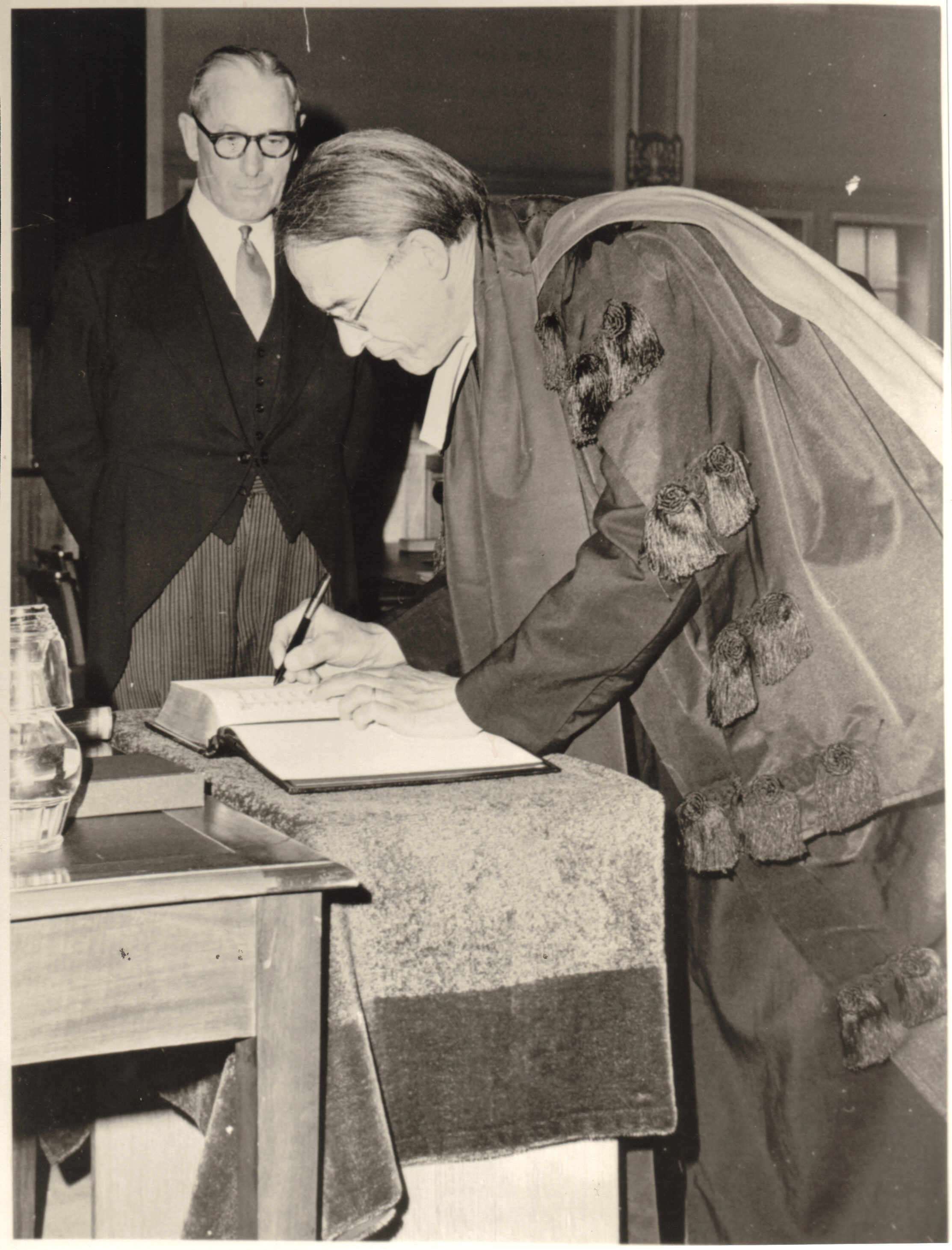
The Queen's College, Oxford, 1977. Caird had just taken up the Dean Ireland's chair, was working on a number of writing projects and supervising research students, and was no longer burdened with the tasks of Oxford college administration. As one commentator remarked, he was at long last "in his element"

Another of Caird's lifelong preoccupations was Paul the Apostle, seen particularly in his works Principalities and Powers, Paul's Letters from Prison, and comments scattered throughout The Language and Imagery of the Bible and New Testament Theology. For Caird Paul has not been given his proper due by modern scholarly opinion in terms of the uniqueness and importance of his contribution to Christianity. As a dyed-in-the-wool Cambridge-trained classicist, Caird saw Paul not so much as a conveyor of supernatural information but as a brilliantly innovative thinker, a skillful interpreter of the scriptures and of the mind of Jesus, or "humanity at its very best". Paul was also a revolutionary, as Caird saw him: one who was fervently committed to the socially convulsive implications of the gospel, especially in such concerns as class divisions within society (including the equality of women), the constant corruption of political and religious authority, and the unity of the Christian church as a rebuke to a warring and fractured world. In all his works Caird never shrank from making clear his unqualified admiration for what he saw as the frequently misunderstood apostle; yet this could hardly be mistaken for hero worship. He could disagree with Paul at times, and "if he had ever seen [him] approaching in the High Street, he wouldn't have treated him with exaggerated deference, nor would he have crossed the street to avoid him. He would probably have invited him to read a paper to his Postgraduate Seminar, and would have felt no embarrassment at taking him into the Senior Common Room for tea beforehand". In certain ways Caird contributed to the debate concerning the New Perspective on Paul, seen perhaps most visibly in an extended review of E. P. Sanders's work Paul and Palestinian Judaism.

=== Eschatology ===
Yet one more of Caird's concerns involved the understanding of Old and New Testament eschatology. It is still largely believed in scholarly circles that Jewish apocalyptic had relinquished all hope for this world and expected an imminent divine intervention as the final thunder-clap of history. Caird saw this as a major distortion. Those who wrote the apocalypses resembled the prophets in that they never let go of their hope in divine interference within the midst of history. Instead, by something called "prophetic camera technique," they used metaphorical imagery that "telescoped" events within history and the ultimate victory of God at the end of time. By such a means this-worldly events were used to elucidate the End, and the End allowed the biblical writers to see historical events in a new and refreshing way. In identical fashion Jesus looked forward to a coming intense testing, for both himself and for his disciples, during his own generation (the near lens), but which pointed to a final ultimate resolution (the far lens). According to Caird, this was just as true for Paul and the author of the Book of Revelation. Hence Caird's The Revelation of St. John the Divine stands as a pristine example of the "Preterist" interpretation of the Apocalypse. For Caird "that which must swiftly come to pass" does not signify the End in the literal sense; it is the end that was imminently confronting the first-century church, encompassing its persecution and potential extinction. Thus, according to Caird, the author of the Apocalypse "no more expects the end of the world than any of the other prophets before him". Such concepts again reveal Caird as clearly standing in the tradition of his teacher, C. H. Dodd, and Dodd's "Realized eschatology." But, through the use of more recent linguistic theory than Dodd had access to, Caird went beyond Dodd's thinking on the subject. At the popular level, Caird's views on eschatology place him at the polar opposite of some best-selling dispensationalist authors such as those who wrote the escapist Left Behind novels; while on a scholarly level, his views have been heavily built upon by some and emphatically disputed by others.

=== Politics: war, women, apartheid, church unity ===
South Africa, 1976. As Moderator of the United Reformed Church, Caird shocked many by directly confronting the South African leaders of the Dutch Reformed Church over their involvement in apartheid.

Caird's writings often stress the integration of theology and politics. Long before it was in vogue, he felt the urgency of including politics in any responsible theological dialogue. This is identifiable early on in Principalities and Powers; there, he repeatedly urged, the unusual phrase meant for Paul his unique take on the political, social, economic and religious power structures of this world. And, as in his work on the historical Jesus, the importance of political concerns in Christianity remains central in his taking on of such varied topics as the modern Christian attitude to war ("War and the Christian"), the status of women in society ("Paul and Women's Liberty"), and apartheid. With regard to the last, his addresses to the South African Dutch Reformed Church (during his tenure in 1975–1976 as Moderator of the United Reformed Church) were later distilled and published as South Africa: Reflections on a Visit. A clarion call for the modern Christian Church's renunciation of racism, it demonstrated that for Caird the gospel, while profoundly religious, is not uniquely religious; it penetrates to all areas of personal and collective human activity. His work as a humanitarian and churchman is perhaps best reflected in Our Dialogue with Rome: The Second Vatican Council and After, which his close friend Henry Chadwick called "a memorable little book" that attempts to bring some order out of the morass of Protestant–Roman Catholic dialogue, "with its unexpected moments of sudden joy and usually more numerous tears".

=== Ultimate assessment ===
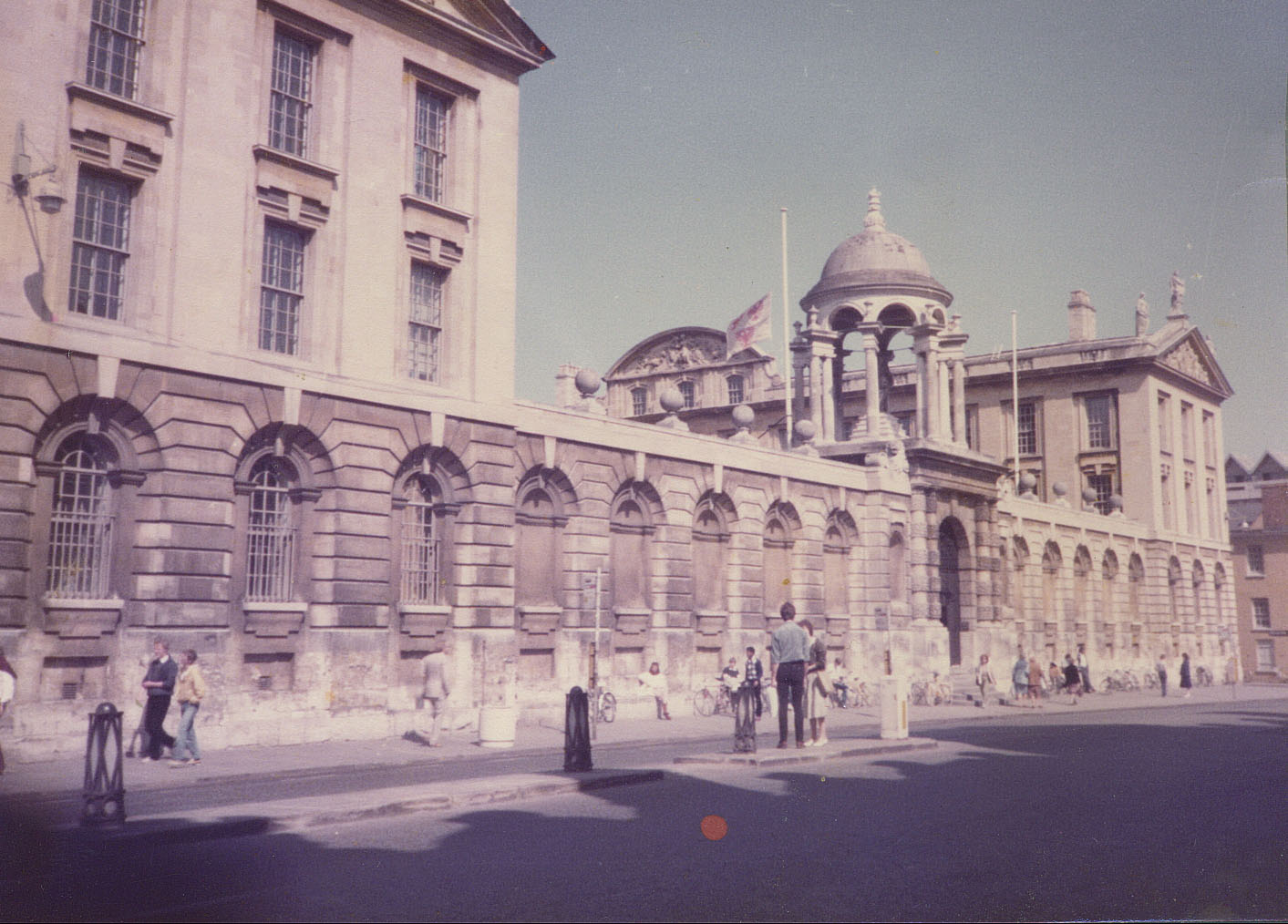
The Queen's College, Oxford, 27 April 1984. The flag is flying at half mast six days after Caird's death.

Caird was a complex figure, which makes any attempt to reduce his life and work into a short survey hazardous. However, taking into account the concerns expressed here, certain things may confidently be said of him—most principally that he was a scholar's scholar, and yet one who was (paradoxically) never a pure academic who enjoyed the sequestered safety of his study. His pastoral temperament was frequently at the fore, and for him it required that he do the double duty of preacher–scholar. "To know George you had to hear him preach, for here became apparent one of the great strengths of his life. It was clearly the same man who conducted advanced seminars and helped graduate students to see through the complexities of their work. Many of those who went to his lectures remarked not only on the vigorous academic discipline they were invited to share, but on the direct relationship they were encouraged to see between honest probing and the preaching of the Gospel" (Donald Sykes). "He understood the task of the exegete to be not only the discernment of the author's original intention but also the elucidation and proclamation of the Gospel of God. Just as he could hardly endure sermons without intellectual content, so his lectures were truly evangelical".

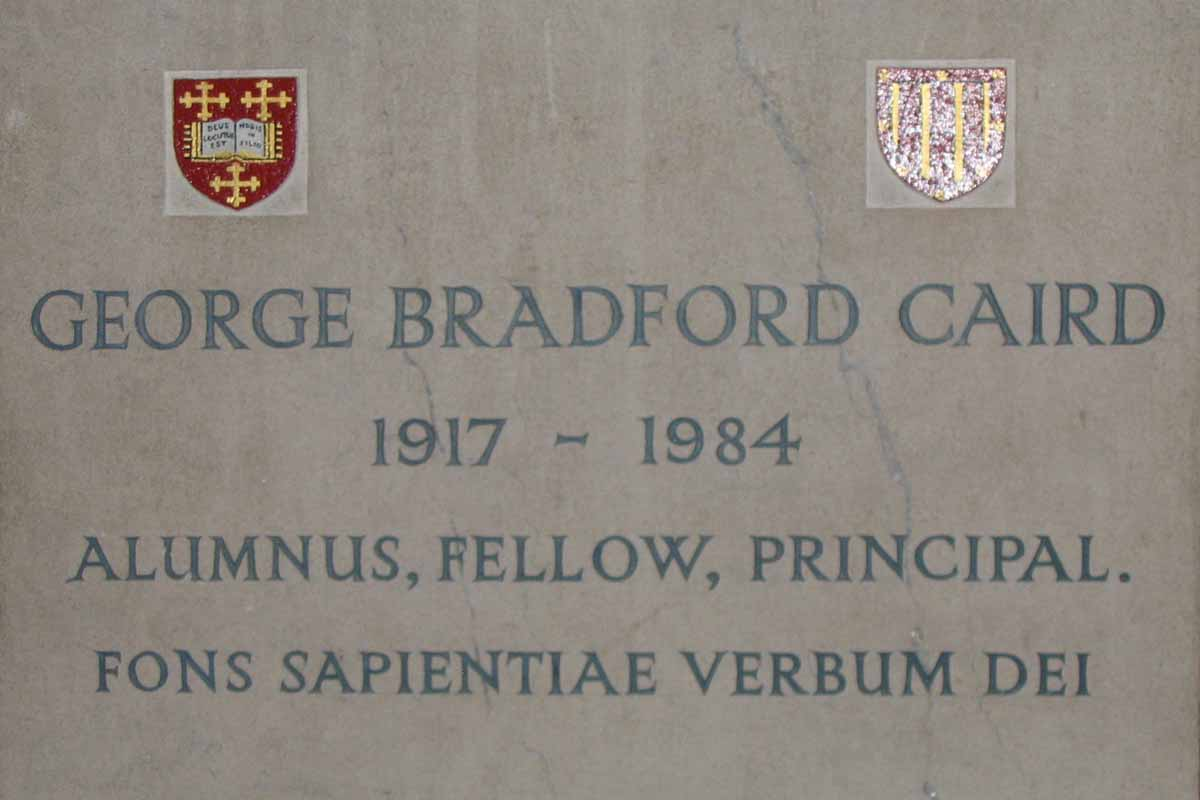
Memorial pillar in the chapel of Mansfield College, Oxford

Caird would probably have appreciated the Latin inscription (chosen by his wife Mollie) in Mansfield College Chapel: "Fons sapientiae verbum Dei" ("The word of God is the fountain of wisdom") (Jesus ben Sirach 1:5; so Caird's translation for the New English Bible).

On a scholarly level it may be said of Caird that, "despite his independence, [he] belonged to and typified a marked tradition within British scholarship. Points of similarity with C. H. Dodd, less often with T. W. Manson, are frequent. What Caird displayed in a highly illuminating way is the manner in which theological conviction, literary values, and historical reasoning worked together in that current of learning . . . in this respect the rethinking of Caird's thoughts can be, and is, a contribution to the whole intellectual history of an era". And finally, on a personal level, "those who knew him will never forget that tall figure who seemed to walk faster than anyone else, black Oxford gown trailing him in the breeze, who always spoke in public without notes, and who—perhaps as a fitting symbol of his life—always seemed to be out of the lecture hall before his listeners had written down his last word or had had the opportunity to consider the meaning of what they had just heard".

== Bibliography ==
G. B. Caird's works are arranged alphabetically by title.

=== Books and commentaries ===
- The Apostolic Age (Essex and London: Duckworth, 1955).
- The Christian Hope, Theological Collections, 13 (London: Society for Promoting Christian Knowledge, 1970), 19 ff.
- The Gospel of St. Luke (Pelican Gospel Commentaries; Harmondsworth: Penguin, 1963).
- with D. E. Jenkins, Jesus and God (London: The Faith Press, 1965).
- Jesus and the Jewish Nation (London: University of London, Athlone Press, 1965).
- The Language and Imagery of the Bible. Foreword by N. T. Wright (Grand Rapids: Eerdmans, 1997 [1980]).
- New Testament Theology, Completed and Edited by L. D. Hurst (Oxford: Clarendon, 1994).
- Paul's Letters from Prison (Oxford: Oxford University Press, 1976).
- Principalities and Powers (Oxford: Clarendon, 1956; reprinted Eugene, Or: Wipf and Stock, 2003, with a new Foreword by L. D. Hurst)
- by W. H. Cadman, ed. G. B. Caird, The Open Heaven (Oxford: Basil Blackwell, 1969).
- Our Dialogue With Rome: The Second Vatican Council and After (London: Oxford University Press, 1967).
- The Revelation of St John the Divine (2d ed.; London: A & C Black, 1985 [1966]).
- with G. W. Briggs and N. Micklem, The Shorter Oxford Bible (London: Oxford University Press, 1951).
- The Truth of the Gospel (London: Oxford University Press, 1950).

=== Articles and essays ===
- "Ben Sira and the Dating of the Septuagint," Studia Evangelica, 4, ed. E. A. Livingstone (Berlin, 1982), 95 ff.
- "The Bible and the Word of God," Christian Confidence, Theological Collections, 14 (London, 1970), 105 ff.
- "Biblical Classics: VIII. James Denney: The Death of Christ," Expository Times 90 (1978-9), 196 ff.
- "Biblical Exegesis and the Ecumenical Movement," in John E. Booty (ed.), The Divine Drama in History and Liturgy: Essays Presented to Horton Davies on His Retirement from Princeton University (Allison Park, Pa. 1984), 203 ff.
- "C. H. Dodd," A Handbook of Christian Theologians, ed. Martin E. Marty and Dean G. Peerman (Cleveland, 1965), 320 ff.
- "Charles Harold Dodd, 1884-1973," The Proceedings of the British Academy, 60 (1974), 497–510; offprint (1975), 3-16.
- "Christian Ethics and Nuclear Warfare," Christus Victor 102 (1958), 4 ff.
- "The Christological Basis of Christian Hope," in G. B. Caird (ed.), The Christian Hope, Theological Collections, 13 (London, 1970), 19 ff.
- "The Chronology of the New Testament," The Interpreter's Dictionary of the Bible (Nashville, 1962), i. 599 ff.
- "The Descent of Christ in Ephesians 4: 7-11," Studia Evangelica, 2, ed. F. L. Cross (Berlin, 1964), 535 ff.
- "The Development of the Doctrine of Christ in the New Testament," in N. Pittinger (ed.), Christ for Us Today (London, 1968), 66 ff.
- "Eschatology and Politics: Some Misconceptions," in Johnston R. McKay and James F. Miller (eds.), Biblical Studies: Essays in Honour of William Barclay (London, 1976), 72 ff., 202 ff.
- "Everything to Everyone: The Theology of the Corinthian Epistles," Interpretation 13 (1959), 387 ff.
- "The Exegetical Method of the Epistle to the Hebrews," Canadian Journal of Theology 5 (1959), 44 ff.
- "Expounding the Parables: I. The Defendant (Matthew 5: 25 f.; Luke 12: 58 f.)," Expository Times 77 (1965-6), 36 ff.
- "The Glory of God in the Fourth Gospel: An Exercise in Biblical Semantics," New Testament Studies 15 (1969), 265 ff.
- "He Who for Men their Surety Stood," Expository Times 73 (1961-2), 24 ff.
- "Health," in The Quality of Life, Report of the British Association Study Group on Science and the Quality of Life, ed. Harford Thomas (London, 1979), 21 ff.
- "Homoeophony in the Septuagint," in R. Hamerton-Kelly and R. Scroggs (eds.), Jesus, Greeks and Christians: Essays in Honor of William David Davies (Leiden, 1976), 74 ff.
- "Introduction and Exegesis to I and II Samuel," in G. A. Buttrick, et al. (eds.), The Interpreter's Bible (Nashville, 1953), ii. 855 ff.
- Introduction to Paul S. Minear's Matthew, the Teacher's Gospel, British ed. (London, 1984).
- "Jesus and Israel: The Starting Point for New Testament Christology," Christological Perspectives: Essays in Honor of Harvey K. McArthur, ed. Robert F. Berkey and Sarah Edwards (New York: Pilgrim Press, 1982), 58 ff.
- "John, Letters of," The Interpreter's Dictionary of the Bible (Nashville, 1962), ii. 946 ff.
- "Judgement and Salvation: An Exposition of John 12: 31-2," Canadian Journal of Theology 2 (1956), 231 ff.
- "Just Men Made Perfect," in Charles S. Duthie (ed.), Resurrection and Immortality: Aspects of Twentieth Century Christian Belief (London: Samuel Bagster & Sons, Ltd., 1979), 89 ff. reprinted from The London Quarterly and Holborn Review.
- "The Kingship of Christ," Expository Times 73 (1961-2), 248 ff.
- "Les Eschatologies du Nouveau Testament," Revue d'Histoire et de Philosophie Religieuses 49 (Paris, 1969), 217 ff.
- Major review of E. P. Sanders, Paul and Palestinian Judaism (Philadelphia, 1977), in Journal of Theological Studies NS 29 (1978), 540 ff.
- "The Mind of Christ: IV. Christ's Attitude to Institutions," Expository Times 62 (1951), 259 ff.
- "The New Testament," in D. T. Jenkins (ed.), The Scope of Theology (Cleveland, 1965), 39 ff..
- "The New Testament Concept of Salvation," Tantur Yearbook (1976-7), Tantur, Jerusalem, 19 ff.
- "New Wine in Old Wine-Skins: I. Wisdom," Expository Times 84 (1973), 164 ff.
- "On Deciphering the Book of Revelation" ("I. Heaven and Earth;" "II. Past and Future;" "III. The First and the Last;" "IV. Myth and Legend"); Expository Times (1962-3), 13 ff.; 51 ff.; 82 ff.; 103 ff.
- "The One and the Many in Mark and John," in Horton Davies (ed.), Studies of the Church in History: Essays Honoring Robert S. Paul on his Sixty-Fifth Birthday (Allison Park, Pa. 1983), 39 ff.
- "Paul and Women's Liberty," Bulletin of the John Rylands Library 54 (1972), 268 ff.
- "Paul the Apostle," in J. Hastings (ed.), Dictionary of the Bible, rev. edn. by F. C. Grant and H. H. Rowley (New York, 1963), 731 ff.
- "Paul's Theology," in J. Hastings (ed.), Dictionary of the Bible, rev. edn. by F. C. Grant and H. H. Rowley (New York, 1963), 736 ff.
- "Perfection and Grace," in C. R. Young, R. A. Leaver, and J. H. Litton (eds.), Duty and Delight: Routley Remembered, memorial vol. for Eric Routley (Carol Stream, Ill. 1985), 21 ff.
- "Predestination: Romans 9-11," Expository Times 68 (1956-7), 324 ff.
- "Recent Articles on Biblical Interpretation," Interpretation 6 (1952), 458 ff.
- "Reconciliation and Man: The Freedom of the New Man," Reformed and Presbyterian World 31 (1970), 56 ff.
- "Reformed-Roman Catholic Study Commission," Reformed World 31 (1971), 243 ff.
- "Relations with Roman Catholics: A Congregationalist View," in B. Leeming (ed.), Towards Christian Unity (London, 1968).
- "Saint Paul the Apostle," Encyclopædia Britannica, 15th edn. (Chicago, 1972 and 1974), xiii. 1090 ff.
- "Samuel," Encyclopædia Britannica (Chicago, 1962; repr. 1972), xix. 984.
- "Son by Appointment," in William C. Weinrich (ed.), The New Testament Age: Essays in Honor of Bo Reicke (Macon, Ga. 1984), 73 ff.
- "The Study of the Gospels" (three articles: "I. Source Criticism;" "II. Form Criticism;" "III. Redaction Criticism"), Expository Times 87 (1975-6), 99 ff.; 137 ff.; 168 ff.
- "Towards a Lexicon of the Septuagint I," Journal of Theological Studies 19 (1968), 453 ff.
- "Towards a Lexicon of the Septuagint II," Journal of Theological Studies 20 (1969), 21 ff.
- "The Transfiguration," Expository Times 67 (1955-6), 291 ff.
- "Uncomfortable Words: II. Shake off the Dust from Your Feet (Mk. 6: 11)," Expository Times 81 (1969–70), 40 ff.
- "The Will of God in the Fourth Gospel," Expository Times 72 (1960-1), 115 ff.

=== Book reviews ===
- "Alexander Nairne's 'The Epistle of Priesthood'," Expository Times 72 (1960-1), 204 ff.
- “Background of the New Testament and Its Eschatology,” Canadian Journal of Theology 3 (1957), 54 ff.
- “Bible and Gospel,” Scottish Journal of Theology 23 (1970), 364 ff.
- “The Cambridge History of the Bible, vol. 1: From the Beginnings to Jerome,” Expository Times 82 (1970), 55 ff.
- “Christian Words,” Expository Times 92 (1981), 152 ff.
- “A Chronology of Paul’s Life,” Journal of Theological Studies NS 31 (1980), 170 ff.
- “Colossians: The Church’s Lord and the Christian’s Liberty – An Expository Commentary with a Present-Day Application,” Journal of Theological Studies NS 24 (1973), 552 ff.
- “A Commentary of the Epistle of Peter and of Jude,” Expository Times 81 (1970), 151 ff.
- “Commentary of the Gospel According to St. John,” Expository Times 80 (1969), 171 ff.
- “Commentary on Romans,” Theology 84 (1981), 221 ff.
- “Commentary on the Documents of Vatican II, vol. 1,” Church Quarterly 1 (1968), 85 ff.
- “Commentary on the Documents of Vatican II, vol. 2,” Church Quarterly 1 (1968), 177 ff.
- “The Community of the Beloved Disciple,” Theology 83 (1980), 146 ff.
- “Dialogue: The State of the Church Today,” Church Quarterly 1 (1968), 85 ff.
- “Die Apostelgeschichte: Übersetz und eklart,” Journal of Biblical Literature 83 (1964), 86 ff.
- “Die Christologie der Apokalypse des Johannes,” Journal of Theological Studies NS 15 (1964), 141 ff.
- “The Early Church: Studies in Early Christian History and Theology,” Canadian Journal of Theology 3 (1957), 129 ff.
- “Einigkeit im Glauben und in der Lehre,” Journal of Theological Studies NS 33 (1982), 253 ff.
- “Ephesians, Baptism and Pentecost: An Inquiry into the Structure and Purpose of the Epistle to the Ephesians,” Scottish Journal of Theology 22 (1969), 225 ff.
- “The Epistle of Saint Paul to the Philippians,” Expository Times 91 (1980), 123 ff.
- “Essays in New Testament Interpretation,” Scottish Journal of Theology 36 (1983), 415 ff.
- “Essays on Typology,” Canadian Journal of Theology 4 (1958), 139 ff.
- “From First Adam to Last: A Study in Pauline Theology,” Expository Times 74 (1963), 228 ff.
- “Gemeinde und Gemeindeordnung im Neuen Testament,” Journal of Theological Studies NS 11 (1960), 392 ff.
- “The Gospel of Mark,” Scottish Journal of Theology 31 (1978), 291 ff.
- “The Gospel Tradition,” Theology 75 (1972), 41 ff.
- “The Gospels and the Jesus of History,” Expository Times 80 (1969), 107 ff.
- “Glory of God and the Transfiguration of Christ,” Congregational Quarterly 29 (1949), 362 ff.
- “Grammatik des Neutestamentlichen Griechisch: Bearb von Rehkopf,” Journal of Theological Studies NS 28 (1977), 139 ff.
- “A Handbook of the Gospels,” Canadian Journal of Theology 3 (1957), 279 ff.
- “Hebrews and Hermeneutics,” Journal of Theological Studies NS 31 (1980), 594 ff.
- “Hebrews and Hermeneutics,” Journal of Theological Studies NS 32 (1981), 248 ff.
- “Henochs Zehnwochenapokalypse und offene Probleme der Apokalyptikforschung,” Journal of Theological Studies NS 31 (1980), 144 ff.
- “The Human Reality of Sacred Scripture,” Ecumenical Review 18 (1966), 481ff.
- “Ignatius von Antiochien und die Paulusbriefe,” Journal of Theological Studies NS 20 (1969), 618 ff.
- “The Interpretation of Matthew,” Theology 87 (1984), 380 ff.
- “Israel in the Apostolic Church,” Expository Times 81 (1970), 333 ff.
- “Jesus and His Coming: The Emergence of a Doctrine,” Canadian Journal of Theology 5 (1959), 66 ff.
- “Jesus and the Son of Man,” Expository Times 77 (1965), 78.
- “Jesus and the Transformation of Judaism,” Journal of Theological Studies NS 33 (1982), 252 ff.
- “The Johannine Epistles,” Expository Times 86 (1974), 57 ff.
- “Kerygma and Comedy in the New Testament: A Structuralist Approach to Hermeneutic,” Journal of Theological Studies NS 28 (1977), 544 ff.
- “Le Mirage de I’Eschatologie,” Journal of Theological Studies NS 32 (1981), 492 ff.
- “Ministre de Jésus-Christ ou le Sacerdoce de l’Évangile,” Journal of Theological Studies NS 18 (1967), 478 ff.
- “Miscellanea Neotestamentica, vol. 1 & 2,” Journal of Theological Studies NS 31 (1980), 170ff.
- “Modern Concordance to the New Testament,” Expository Times 88 (1977), 314 ff.
- “Myth and History in the Book of Revelation,” Expository Times 91 (1980), 219 ff.
- “Neotestamentica et Semitica: Essays in Honor of Matthew Black,” Expository Times 81 (1970), 171.
- “New International Dictionary of New Testament Theology, vol. 3,” Expository Times 92 (1981), 151 ff.
- “New Testament Essays,” Theology 84 (1973), 274 ff.
- “Paolo e gli Arconti a Corinto,” Journal of Theological Studies NS 29 (1978), 543 ff.
- “Paul and Palestinian Judaism: A Comparison of Patterns of Religion,” Journal of Theological Studies NS 29 (1978), 538 ff.
- “Peter: Disciple, Apostle, Martyr,” Expository Times 73 (1962), 297.
- “Philippians,” Scottish Journal of Theology 31 (1978), 293 ff.
- “Pre-Existence, Wisdom, and the Son of Man: A Study of the Idea of Pre-Existence in the New Testament,” Expository Times 84 (1973), 312 ff.
- “Problem of History in Mark,” Journal of Biblical Literature 76 (1957), 318 ff.
- “Rechtfertigung bei Paulus: Studien zur Struktur und zum Bedeutungsgehalt des Paulinschen Rechtfertigungsbegriffs,” Journal of Theological Studies NS 24 (1973), 555 ff.
- “Redactional Style in the Marcan Gospel,” Expository Times 90 (1978), 72 ff.
- “Responsibility for Evil in the Theodicy of IV Ezra,” Journal of Theological Studies NS 31 (1980), 292 ff.
- “Romans: New Century Bible,” Expository Times 85 (1974), 249.
- “Salvation in History,” Expository Times 79 (1967), 43.
- “Significance of Satan: New Testament Demonology and Its Contemporary Relevance,” Journal of Theological Studies NS 13 (1962), 381 ff.
- “Structural Analysis of Narrative,” Journal of Theological Studies NS 28 (1977), 544 ff.
- “Studies in the Acts of the Apostles,” Canadian Journal of Theology 3 (1957), 119 ff.
- “Studies in the New Testament, vol. 2,” Journal of Theological Studies NS 30 (1979), 289 ff.
- “The Macmillan Bible Atlas,” Journal of Theological Studies NS 31 (1980), 290 ff.
- “The Meaning of Righteousness in Paul: A Linguistic and Theological Inquiry,” Journal of Theological Studies NS 24 (1973), 555 ff.
- “The Messianic Secret,” Theology 87 (1984), 380 ff.
- “The Mysterious Parable: A Literary Study,” Journal of Theological Studies NS 29 (1978), 533 ff.
- “The New Temple: The Church in the New Testament,” Scottish Journal of Theology 22 (1969), 377 ff.
- “The New Testament Christological Hymns: Their Historical Religious Background,” Expository Times 83 (1972), 153 ff.
- “The New Testament in Historical and Contemporary Perspective: Essays in Memory of G. H. C. Macgregor,” Journal of Theological Studies NS 18 (1967), 188.
- “The Origin and Intention of the Colossian Haustafel,” Journal of Theological Studies NS 25 (1974), 176 ff.
- “The Passion Narrative of St. Luke: A Critical and Historical Investigation,” Expository Times 83 (1972), 379 ff.
- “The Powers That Be: Earthly Powers and Demonic Rulers in Romans 13:1-7,” Journal of Theological Studies NS 12 (1961), 85 ff.
- “The Purpose of the Biblical Genealogies with Special Reference to the Setting of the Geologies of Jesus,” Journal of Theological Studies NS 21 (1970), 159 ff.
- “The Revelation of St. John the Divine,” Expository Times 76 (1964), 48.
- “The Sayings of Jesus in the Churches of Paul: The Use of the Synoptic Tradition in the Regulation of Early Church Life,” Journal of Theological Studies NS 23 (1972), 483 ff.
- “The Spirit-Paraclete in the Gospel of John,” Journal of Theological Studies NS 22 (1971), 576 ff.
- “The State in the New Testament,” Canadian Journal of Theology 4 (1958), 208 ff.
- “The Temptation and the Passion: The Markan Soteriology,” Expository Times 77 (1966), 300 ff.
- “The Theme of Jewish Persecution of Christians in the Gospel According to St. Matthew,” Expository Times 79 (1968), 238 ff.
- “The Theological Tendency of Codex Bezae Cantabrigensis in Acts,” Expository Times 78 (1967), 237.
- “The Theology of Vatican II,” Church Quarterly 1 (1968), 85 ff.
- “Theology of the Gospels,” Expository Times 78 (1967), 171 ff.
- “Type and History in Acts,” Expository Times 76 (1964), 80.
- “Under-estimated Theological Books: Alexander Nairne’s ‘Epistle of Priesthood’,” Expository Times 72 (1961), 204 ff.
- “Understanding the New Testament,” Journal of Biblical Literature 78 (1959), 168 ff.
- “Who is Jesus of Nazareth: Dogma,” Ecumenical Review 18 (1966), 481ff.
- “Word and Faith,” Expository Times 75 (1963), 76 ff.
- “The Word of God and Mankind,” Church Quarterly 1 (1968), 177 ff.

=== Lectures, studies, and other writings ===
- Christianity and Progress, the twenty-sixth Shaftesbury Lecture, (London: The Shaftesbury Society, 1971).
- The New Testament View of Life (Inaugural Lecture) (Montreal: McGill University Press, 1951).
- with J. Johansen-Berg, South Africa: Reflections on a Visit (London: The United Reformed Church in England and Wales, 1976).
- The Unity We Seek: II, Making It Visible (London: The British Council of Churches, 1964).
- War and the Christian (Surrey: The Fellowship of Reconciliation, 1979).
- The Word for Today (Sackville, NB, Canada: Mount Allison University Press, 1979).
