= John Muddiman =

British theologian (1947–2020)

The Reverend John Muddiman
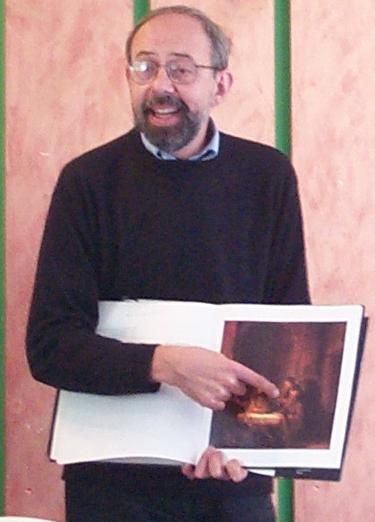
- Muddiman in 2006 explaining The Supper at Emmaus by Rembrandt van Rijn
- Occupations: Academic and clergyman

Academic background
- Education: King Edward VI School, Southampton
- Alma mater: Keble College, Oxford; Selwyn College, Cambridge; Westcott House, Cambridge
- Doctoral advisor: G. B. Caird

Academic work
- Discipline: Theology

John Muddiman (1947 – 5 December 2020) was a British academic and Anglican priest. He was the G. B. Caird Fellow in New Testament Theology at Mansfield College, Oxford, from 1990 until his retirement in 2012.

== Early life and education ==
Muddiman was educated at King Edward VI School, Southampton. He studied at Keble College, Oxford and Selwyn College, Cambridge, and trained for Holy Orders at Westcott House, Cambridge. He studied for his DPhil under the supervision of G. B. Caird.

== Career ==
=== Ordained ministry ===
Muddiman was ordained in the Church of England as a deacon in 1972 and as a priest in 1973. He studied for his doctorate, while simultaneously serving as Chaplain of New College, Oxford. He was a non-stipendiary priest at the Church of St Mary and St Nicholas, Littlemore from 1997 to 2012. He died on 5 December 2020, after a short illness.

=== Academic career ===
Amongst his academic works, he has produced a critically acclaimed examination of authorship in the Epistle to the Ephesians. Moreover, along with John Barton, he has co-edited the Oxford Bible Commentary, a particular favourite amongst undergraduate theologians. His most recent work is a study of the authenticity of the Pauline Epistles. He was co-editor of the Journal of Theological Studies from 2010 to 2012 (succeeding John Barton as biblical editor and being succeeded in turn by Katherine Southwood).
