= Willoughby Bertie, 3rd Earl of Abingdon =

English landowner and Tory politician

Willoughby Bertie, 3rd Earl of Abingdon (28 November 1692 – 10 June 1760), of Wytham Abbey, Berkshire and Rycote, Oxfordshire, was an English landowner and Tory politician who sat briefly in the House of Commons in 1715.

== Early life ==
Bertie was the son of James Bertie of Stanwell in Middlesex and Elizabeth Willoughby, and nephew of Montagu Venables-Bertie, 2nd Earl of Abingdon. He matriculated at Corpus Christi College, Cambridge on 27 November 1707.

== Career ==
The Berties were Tories, with a strong electoral interest in Westbury, where the Earls of Abingdon were lords of the manor. At the 1715 general election in January, Bertie stood for one of the two seats; the mayor of Westbury as returning officer returned two Tories, Bertie and Francis Annesley, while the constable returned two Whigs, George Evans and Charles Allanson. The Whigs had been sponsored by Lord Cowper to challenge the Bertie interest. The return for Bertie and Annesley was initially accepted on 28 March 1715 and they were declared elected, but on petition, a number of their voters were disfranchised, and Evans (who had since been created Baron Carbery) and Allanson were declared elected on 1 June. Bertie did not stand for Parliament again, although at the 1722 election, his father James was returned with Annesley.

== Later life and legacy ==
Bertie married Anna Maria Collins in August 1727 in Florence. In 1743, he succeeded his uncle as Earl of Abingdon. He remained a staunch Tory, as he declined to join the Oxfordshire association in defence of the Hanoverian succession during the Jacobite rising of 1745.

Bertie died on 10 June 1760. He and his wife had nine children:

1. Lady Elizabeth Peregrine Bertie (1728–1804), married Sir John Gallini
2. Lady Jane Bertie (c. 1730 – 25 February 1791), married Thomas Clifton of Westby, Clifton and Lytham
3. Lady Bridget Bertie (1732 – 9 December 1760), unmarried
4. James Bertie, Lord Norreys (25 September 1735 – 12 October 1745), killed in a fire at Rycote
5. Lady Anne Eleanora Bertie (c. 1737 – 19 April 1804), married Philip Wenman, 7th Viscount Wenman
6. Willoughby Bertie, 4th Earl of Abingdon (1739/40–1799)
7. Hon. Peregrine Bertie (of Weston-on-the-Green) (1741–1790)
8. Lady Mary Bertie (12 November 1746 – 22 July 1826), married Miles Stapleton (d. 1809)
9. Lady Sophia Bertie (6 November 1748 – 1760), unmarried

In 1764, the trustees of his estate sold some of his manors in Oxfordshire: Wendlebury to Sir Edward Turner, 2nd Baronet, and Chesterton to George Spencer, 4th Duke of Marlborough. In Wiltshire, Marden was sold to George Willy and Patney to Robert Amor.

Parliament of Great Britain
Preceded by Henry Bertie; Francis Annesley	Member of Parliament for Westbury; 1715; With: Francis Annesley	Succeeded by The Lord Carbery; Charles Allanson
Peerage of England
Preceded by Montagu Venables-Bertie	Earl of Abingdon; 1743–1760	Succeeded by Willoughby Bertie
