= Willoughby Bertie, 4th Earl of Abingdon =

English peer and music patron

The Right Honourable The Earl of Abingdon
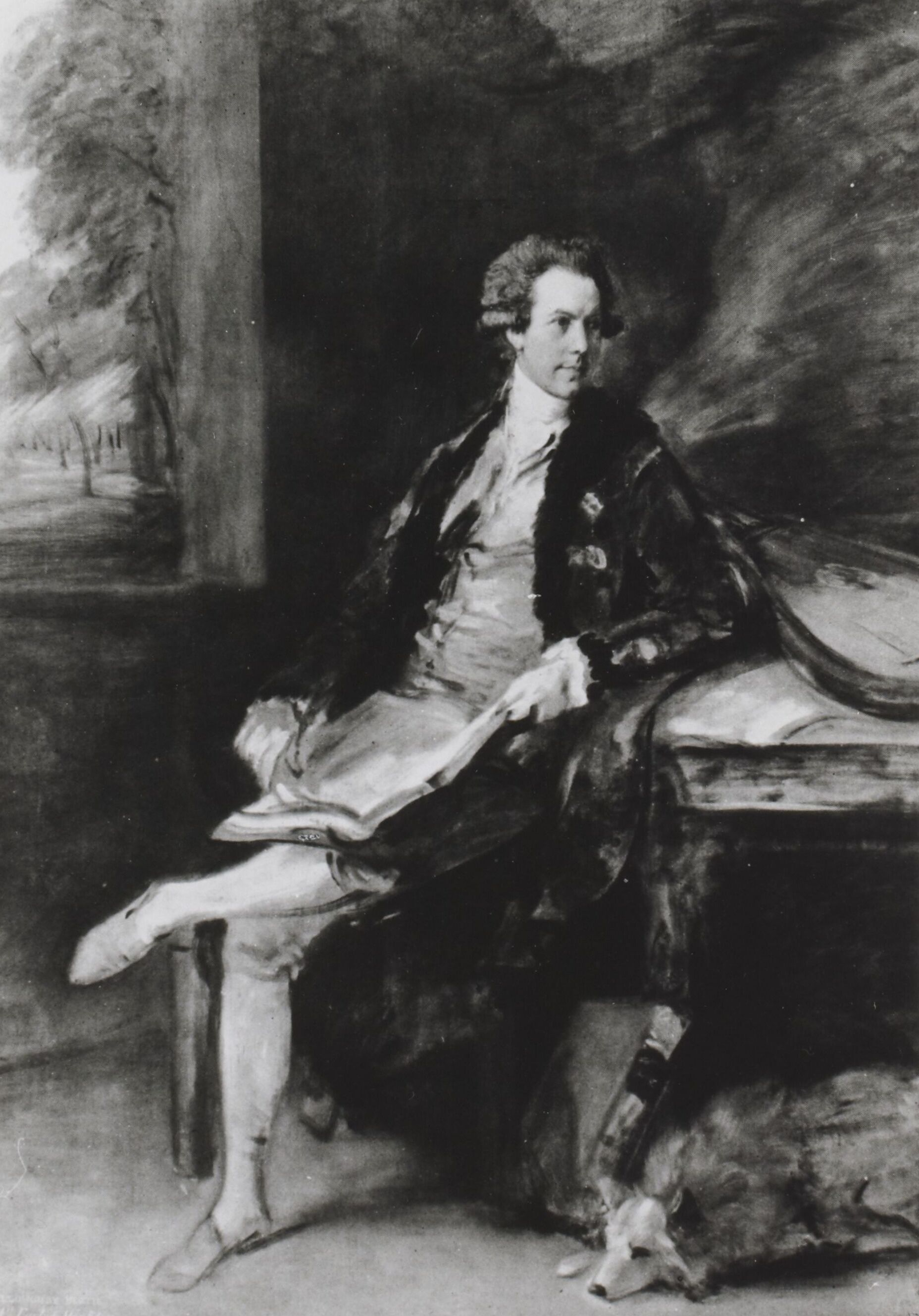
- Born: 16 January 1740; Lincolnshire, England
- Died: 26 September 1799 (aged 59); Great Britain
- Spouse: Charlotte Warren
- Children: 7

Willoughby Bertie, 4th Earl of Abingdon (16 January 1740 – 26 September 1799), styled Lord Norreys from 1745 to 1760, was an English peer and music patron. Bertie was born in Gainsborough, Lincolnshire, the second eldest son of Willoughby Bertie, 3rd Earl of Abingdon and Anna Maria Collins. On 29 January 1759, he matriculated at Magdalen College, Oxford and received his MA on 29 May 1761.

Bertie was a music patron and composer, as well as a political writer. His brother-in-law Giovanni Gallini brought him into contact with J.C. Bach and Carl Friedrich Abel, and he was subsequently very involved in their careers. During his time in England (1791–1792, 1794–1795), Abingdon was a patron of Haydn's, who may have encouraged him to compose. Abingdon is credited with the composition of one hundred and twenty musical works.

He and his family lived at Rycote in Oxfordshire and in 1769 he funded the construction of the Swinford Toll Bridge across the River Thames near Eynsham. Bertie bred the famous racehorse Potoooooooo, considered one of the finest racehorses of the 18th century. The unusual name came from instructions to his stable boy to write the horse's intended name, Potato, on its feed bin, and the boy instead wrote out "Pot" with eight o's. The joke greatly amused Bertie and he decided to make the name official.

Abingdon earned himself the reputation of a political maverick. His obituary in the Gentleman's Magazine remarked that "his frequent speeches in the House of Peers were peculiarly eccentric". An outspoken critic of Lord North and his administration, he rigorously defended the liberties of the American colonies, yet denounced the French Revolution as a threat to "the Peace, the Order, the Subordination, the Happiness of the whole habitable Globe." He argued that the movement for the abolition of the slave trade was simply the result of a "new philosophy" inspired by the new French republic.

When his elder brother James died in a fire at Rycote in 1745, Bertie became his father's heir, succeeding him as 4th Earl of Abingdon on 10 June 1760. In 1761, he sold the manor of West Lavington, Wiltshire to Robert Palmer and Thomas Walker, and in 1762, he sold the manor of Frilsham, Berkshire to George Amyand.

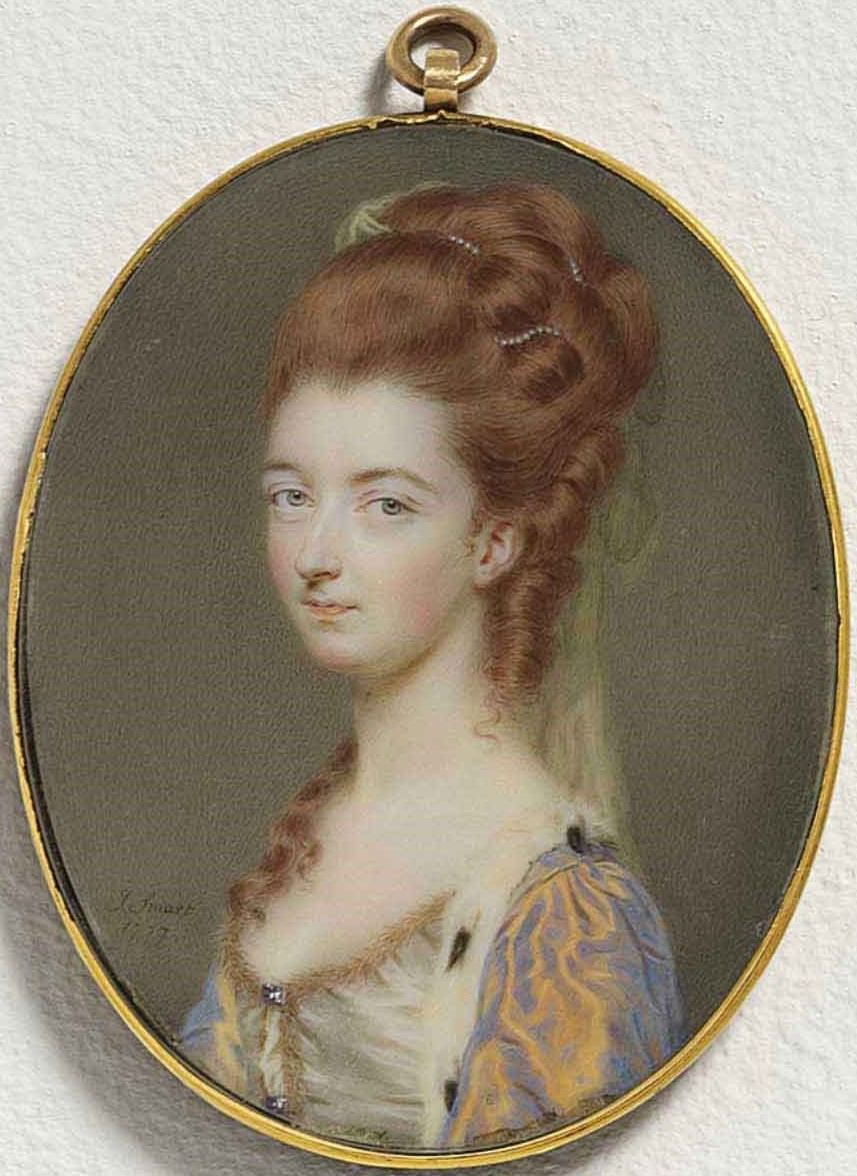
Portrait of Charlotte Warren by John Smart, circa 1777

He married Charlotte Warren, daughter of Admiral Sir Peter Warren, on 7 July 1768. Lady Abingdon died on 28 January 1794. They had seven children:

- Willoughby Bertie, Lord Norreys (8 February 1779 – 20 February 1779)
- Willoughby Bertie, Lord Norreys (born 9 April 1781), died in infancy
- Montagu Bertie, 5th Earl of Abingdon (30 April 1784 – 16 October 1854)
- Capt. Hon. Willoughby Bertie (24 June 1787 – 19 December 1810), married Catherine Jane Saunders on 26 November 1808, lost commanding HMS Satellite; posthumous son Willoughby Vere Bertie (20 April 1811 – 26 July 1812)
- Lady Caroline Bertie (17 October 1788 – 12 March 1870), married Charles John Baillie-Hamilton on 23 January 1821
- Hon. Peregrine Bertie (30 July 1790 – 17 October 1849)
- Rev. Hon. Frederic Bertie (12 February 1793 – 4 February 1868), married on 17 October 1795 to Lady Georgiana Anne Emily Kerr, daughter of Lord Mark Kerr

Abingdon was plagued by financial problems from the moment he inherited the earldom. With his own extravagant lifestyle doing little to alleviate his problems, he died insolvent in 1799. Much of his estate at Westbury, Wiltshire, was sold off over a period from 1777 until his death. The manor of Weston-on-the-Green in Oxfordshire, which he inherited from his brother Captain Peregrine Bertie in 1790, was entailed by Peregrine as a secundogeniture and passed to his younger sons, eventually becoming the property of the Rev. Frederic Bertie.

Abingdon Square Park in Manhattan is named after him and/or his wife. The park is located with the former 300-acre estate of his father-in-law, Sir Peter Warren.

Peerage of England
Preceded by Willoughby Bertie	Earl of Abingdon; 1760–1799	Succeeded by Montagu Bertie
