= Speen, Buckinghamshire =

Village in Buckinghamshire, England

Coordinates: 51.691°N 0.784°W

Speen
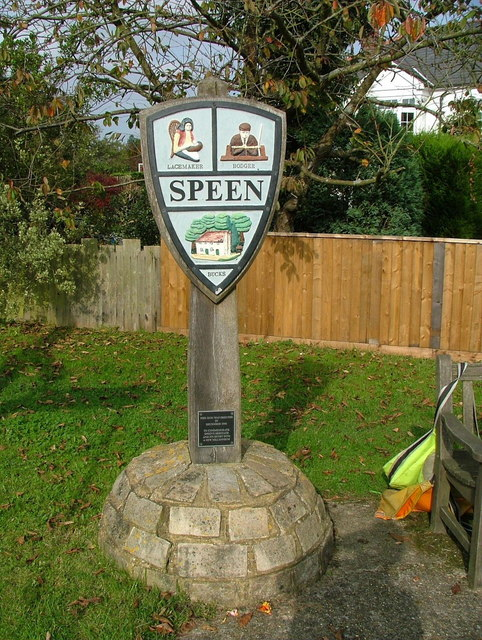
- Speen village sign depicting local trades

- Location within Buckinghamshire
- OS grid reference: SU845995
- Civil parish: Lacey Green
- Unitary authority: Buckinghamshire
- Ceremonial county: Buckinghamshire
- Region: South East
- Country: England
- Sovereign state: United Kingdom
- Post town: PRINCES RISBOROUGH
- Postcode district: HP27
- Dialling code: 01494
- Police: Thames Valley
- Fire: Buckinghamshire
- Ambulance: South Central
- UK Parliament: Mid Buckinghamshire

Speen is a village in the Chiltern Hills, an Area of Outstanding Natural Beauty, situated in the civil parish of Lacey Green, in Buckinghamshire, England.

The centre of the village (depicted by the village sign) is 3 miles (5 km) south-east of Princes Risborough, and 5 miles (8.0 km) north of High Wycombe. The village is a short distance from Hampden House, originally owned by John Hampden and a further distance from Chequers, the country residence of the Prime Minister.

The village has an annual fete which is usually held on the first weekend of July and a bi-annual arts festival which consists of entertainment shows, a theatre production and general activities on Speen Playing Field.

== History ==
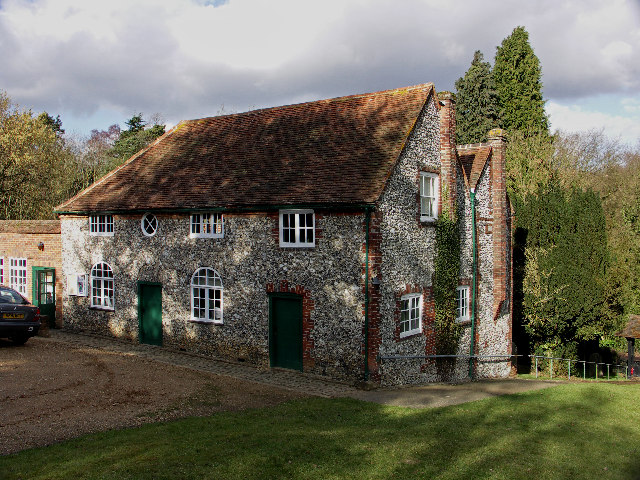
Baptist Church, Speen

The village name originates from Anglo Saxon. The exact meaning is unclear, but possibly meaning 'wood-chip place'. The name of the village corresponds to the location of the hamlet in the Chiltern Forest where trees were regularly felled.

The Baptist church was built by men of the village in 1802. The flints were apparently collected in their aprons by local women from surrounding fields, helped by their children. It is a Grade II listed building.

== Surrounding Lands and Population ==
The village is in the style of a traditional 18th century village. Its surroundings consists of a mixture of woodland and agricultural fields. Due to the geographical location of the village no railway station was built. There are approximately 165 houses in the village which had a population at the time of the 2011 census of 637 and has an estimated population of 654 in 2019.

== Speen Festival ==
The village hosts the Speen Festival, a culture and arts festival, in the September of odd-numbered years.

The first Speen Festival, in 2001, was based on a festival called The Leaves of Time, held in 1999 to celebrate the passing of the millennium.

== Notable residents ==
- In 1928 the artist Eric Gill moved to Pigotts at Speen, where he set up a printing press, and lettering workshop and alternative community. He is buried in the Baptist churchyard.
- The composer Edmund Rubbra lived at Valley Cottage, Highwood Bottom, Speen, for many years following his marriage in 1933.
- Ishbel Peterkin, the eldest daughter of Ramsay MacDonald, bought and then ran the pub, The Old Plow, for 17 years.
- In the 1960s physicist Bernard Robinson bought Pigotts and in 1966 and transferred his amateur Music Camp there.
