= Bothampstead =

Hamlet in Berkshire, England

Coordinates: 51.48°N 01.28°W

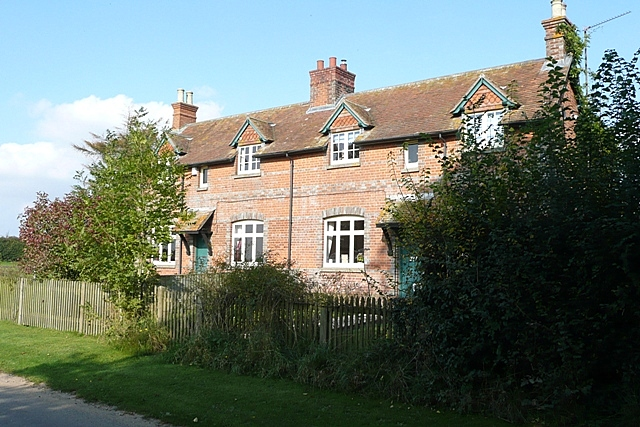
- Bothampstead Cottages

- Location within Berkshire
- OS grid reference: SU5076
- Shire county: Berkshire
- Region: South East
- Country: England
- Sovereign state: United Kingdom
- Police: Thames Valley
- Fire: Royal Berkshire
- Ambulance: South Central

Bothampstead is a hamlet in the English county of Berkshire, and within the civil parish of Hampstead Norreys. It consists of several houses and a farm. The word Bothampstead means "of two parts". Therefore, there is an upper and lower Bothampstead containing a few houses respectively.

The manor of Bodenhampstead was owned in succession by the De la Beches and the Langfords, and later by the families of Norris and Bertie. Subsequent owners included the Gallinis, Mathews and Pocock families. In the 19th Century Mr I.H Pocock sold the manor to George Palmer, MP for Reading.

== Music Camp ==
The Malthouse, Bothampstead was the site of Music Camp, an influential annual gathering of amateur musicians who tackled challenging repertoire with the aid of many professional (or future professional) musicians - including Dennis Brain, Colin Davis, John Gardner, Peter Pears and many more. It was founded by the physicist Bernard Robinson in 1935. Two camps of 10 days each summer took place there most years before the event moved to Pigotts in Speen, Buckinghamshire in 1966. His son Nicholas Wheeler Robinson (1937-2022), was a teacher who carried on Music Camp activities in Buckinghamshire. Nick Robinson wrote a memoir of his father's life.
