= Raffalovich =

Raffalovich is a surname. Notable people with the surname include:

- Arthur Raffalovich (1853-1921), Russian financier and economist
- Elena Raffalovich (1842-1918), Russian educator
- Marc-André Raffalovich (1864–1934), French poet and writer
- Sophie Raffalovich (1860–1960), writer and Irish nationalist
