= Cork Free Press =

Nationalist newspaper in Ireland

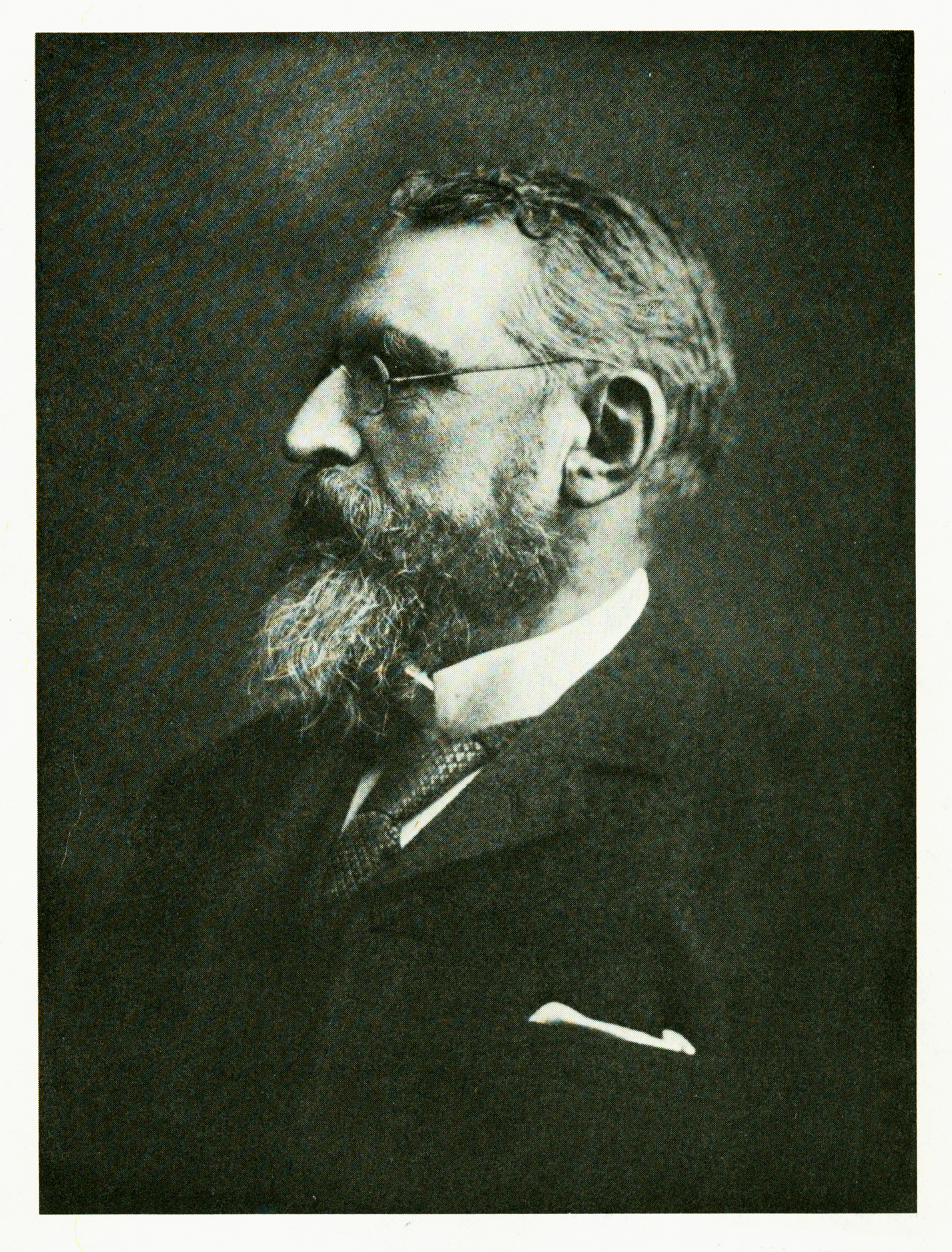
William O'Brien MP publisher of three newspapers

The Cork Free Press (11 June 1910 – 9 December 1916) was a nationalist newspaper in Ireland, which circulated primarily in the Munster region surrounding its base in Cork, and was the newspaper of the dissident All-for-Ireland League party (1909–1918). Published daily from June 1910 until 1915, and weekly in 1915–16, it was the third of three newspapers founded and published within a decade by William O'Brien MP. It developed a unique approach to the national question and to the social issues of the day, with a pronounced conciliatory view to achieving Home Rule for the whole of Ireland. It displayed a favourable attitude towards the Sinn Féin movement. Its main rival newspapers were the Cork Examiner and the Freeman's Journal.

== The Irish People ==
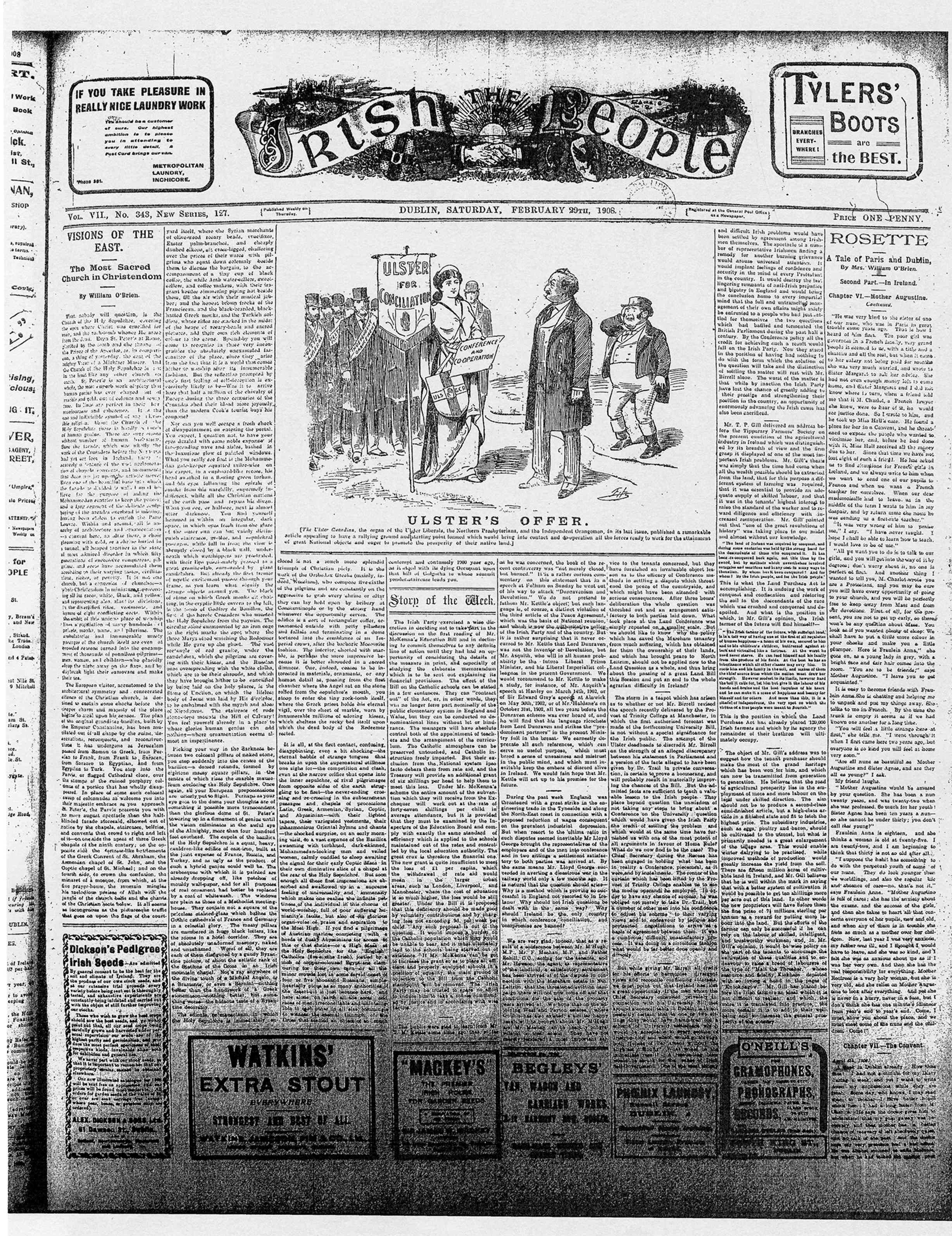
The Irish People newspaper issue February 1908 with Ulster's offer

The Irish People (16 September 1899 – 7 November 1903), was the first of three newspapers published by William O'Brien. Its object to support his new agrarian reform organisation, the United Irish League. It was a Dublin based politically oriented weekly newspaper, its managing editor Tim McCarthy, previous editor of the Freeman's Journal. The paper was financed principally by William O'Brien's wife Sophie, sister of poet and socialite Marc André Sebastian Raffalovich and daughter of the Russian Jewish banker, Hermann Raffalowich, domiciled in Paris. The Irish People ceased publication abruptly with O'Brien's resignation from public life on 4 November 1903, after he had been alienated from the Irish Parliamentary Party . He had successfully negotiated and won the Land Purchase (Ireland) Act 1903 which settled the age-old Irish Land Question, but denounced in an Irish party attack launched by John Dillon MP rejecting his policy of conciliation with landlords. The paper's editor Tim McCarthy only learnt of his demise a day later. As a future editor of the Belfast Irish News he later became one of O'Brien's bitterest critics. The machinery of the Irish People was bought by John O'Donnell MP and moved to Galway, where he set up the Connaught Champion (1904–1911).

The Irish People (30 September 1905 – 27 March 1909) was re-published in Cork after O'Brien's return to public life in 1904, its editor John Herlihy. The paper aimed at furthering O'Brien's concept of national conciliation and promoting full-scale implementation of the Land Act, by encouraging tenant land purchase and extolling its benefits. This through an alliance with the Land and Labour Association which had become the Munster base for O'Brien's renewed political activities. The Irish People, O'Brien's prime political media, propagated from 1906 the cottage building programmes won under the 1906 Labourer (Ireland) Act. Its editorials, usually penned by D. D. Sheehan MP, condemned in regular rhetorical exchanges with the Irish party's Freeman's Journal, the party's relentless campaign against land purchase.

The Irish People ceased publication finally in March 1909 when O'Brien travelled abroad to recover from the December 1908 Baton Convention sickened by Devlinite thuggery and corruption, but not before it praised Sinn Féin as honest youngsters, who could yet be won over by a great new national movement.

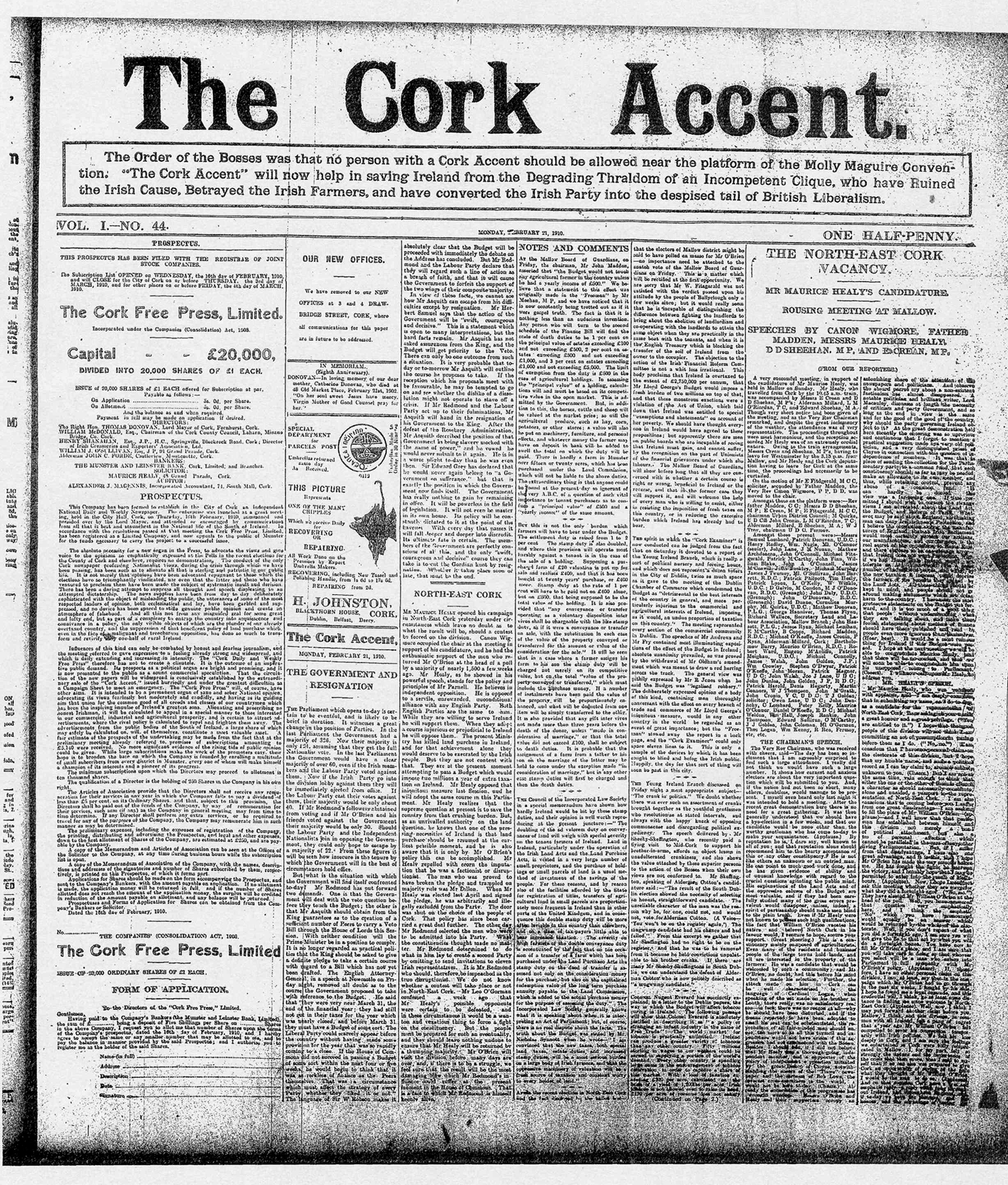
The Cork Accent newspaper February 1910

== The Cork Accent ==
The Cork Accent (1 January 1910 – 10 June 1910) appeared on O'Brien's return at the end of the year. The short-lived Cork Accent carried the following explanation of the title in every issue:

The Order of the Bosses was that no person with a Cork Accent should be allowed near the platform of a Molly Maguire Convention.
The Cork Accent will now help in saving Ireland from the Degrading Thraldom of an Incompetent Clique, who have ruined the Irish Cause,
Betrayed the Irish Farmers, and have converted the Irish Party into the despised tail of British Liberalism.

In its first editorial, it condemned the Cork Examiner as representing a Delvinite form of Catholic Orangism. Further issues covered the resounding success of the eight O'Brienite Independent Nationalists returned in the January 1910 general election, (soon to become O'Brien's new national movement, the All-for-Ireland League), as well as the political stalemate in the House of Commons. In February a fund was launched at Cork City Hall for the publication of a new full-scale daily paper, the Cork Free Press.

== Cork Free Press ==
C O R K ~ F R E E ~ P R E S S
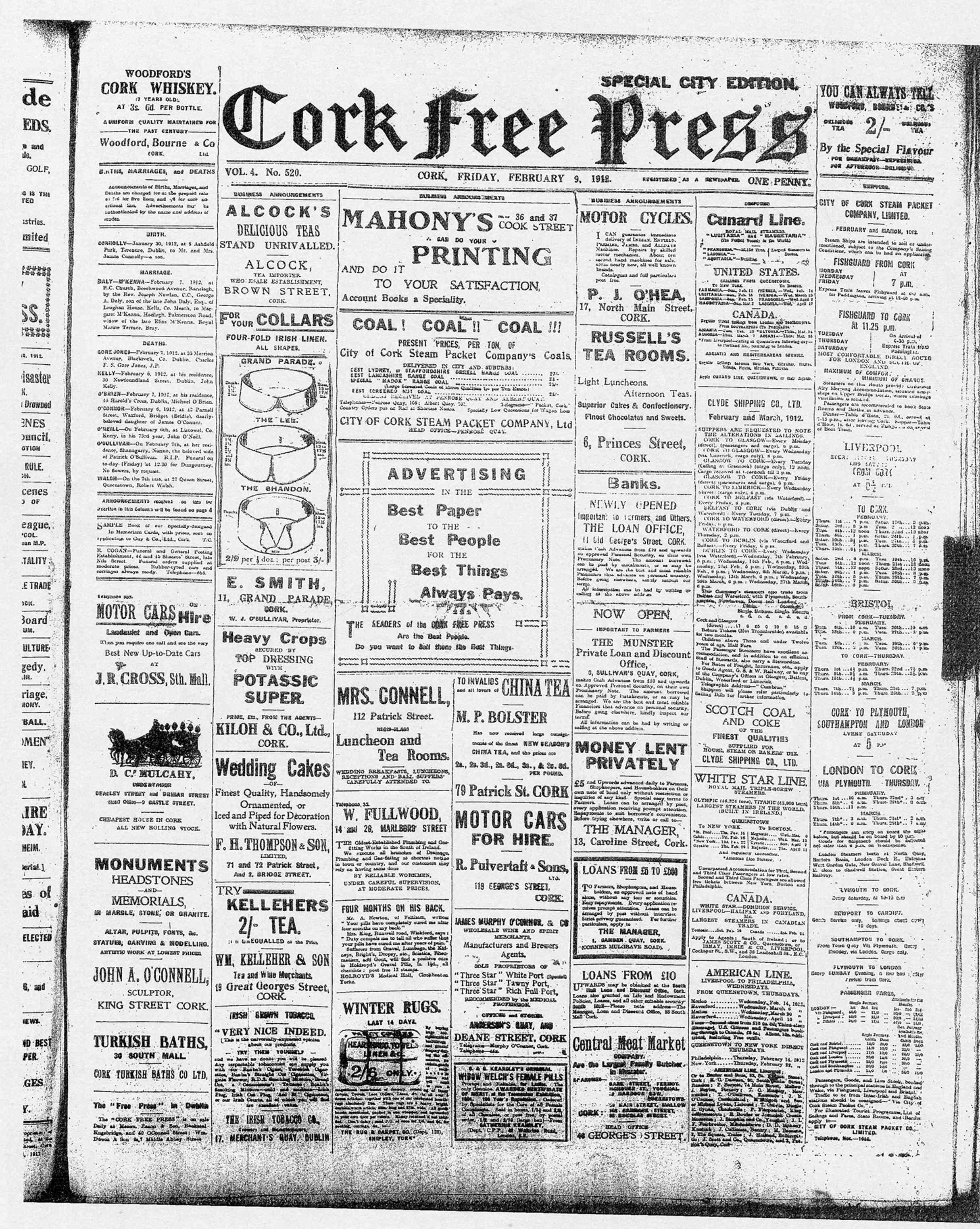
- Typical issue dated 9 February 1912
- Type: Newspaper
- Format: Broadsheet
- Founder: William O'Brien MP
- Editor: Frank Gallagher
- Founded: 11 June 1910
- Ceased publication: 1916
- Political alignment: All-for-Ireland League

The Cork Free Press made its appearance on 11 June 1910, with John Herlihy as the first of three editors. The opening issue carried a splendid leading article by the founding member and staunch supporter of the All-for–Ireland League, Canon Sheehan of Donerail, cautioning against the Protestant class being replaced by a newly rising "Catholic Ascendancy". The League held its public inaugural meeting in March, and from July all issues had one central theme, to promote the conciliatory principles of the League in achieving Home Rule, with extensive coverage of election meetings in preparation for the December elections. It regularly attacked the Irish Party for allying with 'socialists, secularists and land nationalisers'. The Redmondite controlled Freeman's Journal countered by rebuking the O'Brienite Independents as dissident factionists. The Cork Free Press continually accused the Redmonite Cork Examiner of supporting the disreputable Ancient Order of Hibernians.

Soon after the appearance of the Cork Free Press, however, Herlihy fell out with O'Brien. He had decided to replace the linotype printing machines with newly developed monotype technology, certainly more suitable for book publishing, but not for high-volume newspaper publishing. The Cork Free Press became notorious for misprints, and Herlihy was fired. He unsuccessfully sued for unfair dismissal, was then active as a journalist in London and in the mid-1930s, one year editor of the Irish Press. Herlihy's successor was Hugh Art O'Grady, eldest son of Standish James O'Grady, a young Trinity graduate who was sincerely in accord with All-for-Ireland aspirations. The December 1910 general election saw the League victorious in Cork, returning eight MPs, but elsewhere succumbed to clerical opposition. With Home Rule in the offing, the paper reflected the outrage of O'Brien and his party colleagues when Redmond gave way to partition under pressure from Sir Edward Carson, after specific concessions were published in the January 1914 edition of the paper which O'Brien claimed were acceptable to Ulster, to enable it to come in on an All-Ireland Home Rule agreement.

The Redmondites saw themselves as achieving Home Rule, the All-for-Ireland League saw them as having achieved partition. When World War I broke in August 1914, Home Rule was set aside. The Cork Free Press published O'Brien's reasoning for giving support to Irish participation in the war, by telling readers that the war had welded the Irish together and to secure All-Ireland Home Rule it was necessary to join Britain and the Allies in their hour of need. This was so very much in accord with O'Grady's own martial enthusiasm that he eventually decided to resign his post in 1915 and enlist in the war.

The London correspondent of the Cork Free Press at the time was Frank Gallagher, a Cork native and from 1915 its third editor, who though himself a separatist, personally admired O'Brien. He had attempted to dissuade O'Brien from his decision to support the war, as he was rightly worried about the negative effects it would have on circulation and on the League, particularly since rising losses and paper shortages forced the paper to become a weekly in mid-1915.

== Lean to Sinn Féin ==
After the Rising in 1916, Gallagher contacted O'Brien in London to discuss the attitude of the Cork Free Press to it. He found that O'Brien attributed it to Larkinites. Gallagher said the staff would walk out unless the paper took a more favourable attitude. O'Brien capitulated and soon developed an admiration for the insurgents' idealism and their desperation at possible consequences. O'Brien's Cork Free Press soon began to present an altogether favourable attitude towards Sinn Féin, practically becoming a Sinn Féin organ. Though the paper continued to point out the lesson that physical force had been proved useless and that what was needed was a united constitutionalism. The editorials took on a distinctly heroic view of the rebels and damned Redmond and the Irish MPs for their anti- Sinn Féin utterances.

The editorial in the issue of 30 September 1916 betrayed all the hesitance about embracing Sinn Féin that had distinguished O'Brien's attitude over the years: "It is to the Sinn Féin party that Ireland must now look to mould the future of her people". This mirrored Gallagher's separatist aspirations and that of most of the paper's staff. The quasi-separatist attitude of the Cork Free Press increased sales, though paper shortage and lack of capital left its financial position hopeless.

== Suppressed ==
The paper suffered closure because soon after the appointment of Lord Decies as Chief Press Censor for Ireland. Decies warned the press to be careful about what they published. Such warnings had little effect when dealing with such papers as the Cork Free Press.

It was suppressed after Gallagher accused the British authorities of lying about the conditions and situation of republican prisoners in the Frongoch internment camp.

Finally, when in December 1916, O'Brien ceased publication of the Cork Free Press, he lost the last effective link with his constituents. To keep the paper alive since 1910 had cost £30,000 of his wife's savings. In the 1918 general elections, the All-for-Ireland League MPs stood down in favour of Sinn Féin. Frank Gallagher was subsequently founding editor of The Irish Press and director of publicity for Éamon de Valera (1931–35).
