= Blackfriars =

Blackfriars, derived from Black Friars, a common name for the Roman Catholic Dominican Order of friars, may refer to:

== England ==
- Blackfriars, Bristol, a former priory in Bristol
- Blackfriars, Cambridge, an active Dominican priory in Cambridge
- Blackfriars, Canterbury, a former priory in Canterbury, Kent
- Blackfriars, Derby, a former priory in Derby
- Blackfriars, Exeter, a former priory in Exeter, Devon
- Blackfriars, Gloucester, a former priory in Gloucester
- Blackfriars, Greater Manchester, an inner city area of Salford named after a former priory
- Blackfriars, Hereford, a former priory in Hereford
- Blackfriars, Ipswich, a former priory in Ipswich, Suffolk
- Blackfriars, King’s Lynn, a former priory in King’s Lynn, Norfolk
- Blackfriars, Lancaster, a former Priory in Lancaster
- Blackfriars, Leicester, a former priory in Leicester
- Blackfriars, London, site of a former priory in the City of London
- Blackfriars, Newcastle upon Tyne, a former priory in Tyne and Wear
- Blackfriars, Norwich, a former priory in Norwich, Norfolk - the most complete Dominican priory complex to survive the reformation
- Blackfriars, Oxford, an active Dominican priory and Hall of the University of Oxford, Oxfordshire
- Blackfriars, Thetford, a former priory in Thetford, Norfolk
- Blackfriars, Worcester, a former priory in Worcester later the site of a shopping centre named after it
- Holy Cross Priory, Leicester, an active Dominican priory in Leicester
- St Dominic’s Priory, Newcastle, a recently active Dominican Priory in Newcastle

== Scotland ==
- Blackfriars, Montrose, a former priory at Montrose, Scotland
- Blackfriars, Perth, a former priory at Perth, Scotland

== Other uses ==
- "Blackfriars" (Neverwhere), a 1996 television episode
- Blackfriars Peak, a mountain in Alberta, Canada

=== Australia ===
- Blackfriars Primary School (1885–1905), now a campus of University of Technology Sydney
- Blackfriars Priory School, a Dominican school in Prospect, South Australia

=== England ===
- Blackfriars station, a railway station in the City of London
- Blackfriars Theatre, the name of two theatres which once stood in London
- Blackfriars Arts Centre, an arts centre in Boston, England
- Blackfriars Bridge, a bridge over the River Thames in London
- Blackfriars Bridge, Manchester, a bridge over the River Irwell in Manchester
- Blackfriars Bridge railway station a former London railway station named after the London bridge.
- New Blackfriars, a theological journal formerly called Blackfriars

=== Scotland ===
- Blackfriars, the name of a house at Robert Gordon's College, Aberdeen

=== Elsewhere ===
- Blackfriars Playhouse, the American Shakespeare Center's theatre in Staunton, Virginia
