= Adolph Jensen =

Danish economist and statistician

- Born: July 15, 1866
- Died: May 24, 1948 (aged 81)
- Education: Århus University
- Scientific career
- Fields: Statistics
- Workplaces: Danish Ministry of Finance

Adolph Ludvig Otto Jensen (15 July 1866 – 24 May 1948) was an economist and statistician of international standing, and from 1913 to 1936 the head of the Statistics Department of the Danish Ministry of Finance.

== Career ==
Jensen studied Politics at Århus University, 1885–1892, under Harald Westergaard. From 1896 to 1936, he worked at the Department of Statistics of the Danish Ministry of Finance, becoming head of the department in 1913. He took an active part in international research into statistics, as well as statistical research into economic and social issues.

== Publications ==
- The chapter on "The Scandinavian Nations" in volume 4 of A History of Banking in all the Leading Nations (1896; reprinted 1971).
- "The History and Development of Statistics in Denmark", in The History of Statistics, collected and edited by John Koren (Published for the American Statistical Association by the Macmillan Company of New York, 1918), pp. 201–214.
- "Report on the Representative Method in Statistics", Bulletin de l'Institut International de Statistique 22 (1925), 359–380
- "Purposive Selection", Journal of the Royal Statistical Society 91:4 (1928), 541–547.
- "Horoscope of the Population of Denmark", Bulletin de l'Institut International de Statistique, 25 (1931), 41–49.
- "Migration Statistics of Denmark, Norway and Sweden", in International Migrations, Volume II: Interpretations, ed. Walter F. Willcox, National Bureau of Economic Research, 1931.
- Befolkningsspørgsmaalet i Danmark, 1939.
- Tallenes Tale, 1941.
