= Soeda =

Soeda or Soyeda (Japanese: 添田) is a Japanese surname. Notable people with the surname include:

== People ==
- Azenbō Soeda (1872-1944), Japanese enka singer and lyricist
- Juichi Soyeda (1864-1929), Japanese banker
- Go Soeda (born 1984), Japanese tennis player
