= New Ireland (newspaper) =

Irish Nationalist weekly newspaper

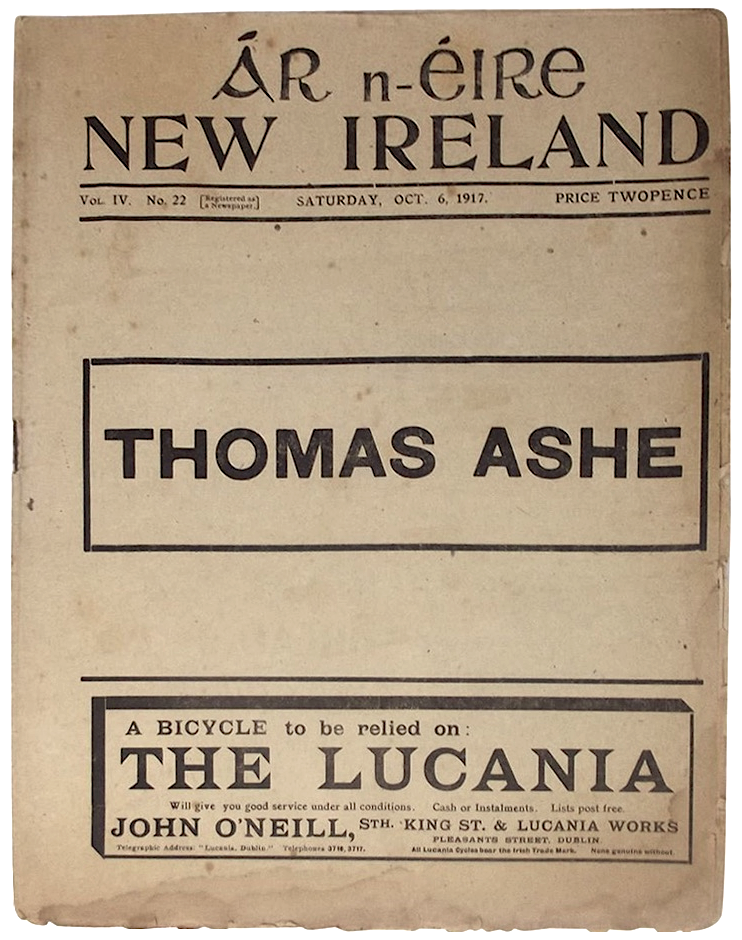
Front page of 6 October 1917 issue featurung the obituary notice of Thomas Ashe on hunger strike

Ár n-Éire New Ireland was an Irish Nationalist weekly newspaper published between 1915 and 1922. It was edited by Patrick Little who edited An Phobalcht and became a Fianna Fail TD.

It was published from 13 Fleet Street, Dublin, and published during the 1916 Rising. The author and future editor of the Irish Press Frank Gallagher worked as a journalist for the New Ireland. Others who made contributions to the content of the New Ireland included James McNeill (brother of Eoin, and second Governor-General of the Irish Free State) and Laurence Patrick Byrne. The paper would have supported the Irish Parliamentary Party but became more pro-Sinn Féin as time went on. The paper supported a number of charity initiatives such as the Dublin Infant Aid Society.
