= Bloody Sunday (1887) =

Protest in London against the Conservative government

- Part of the Irish Home Rule movement
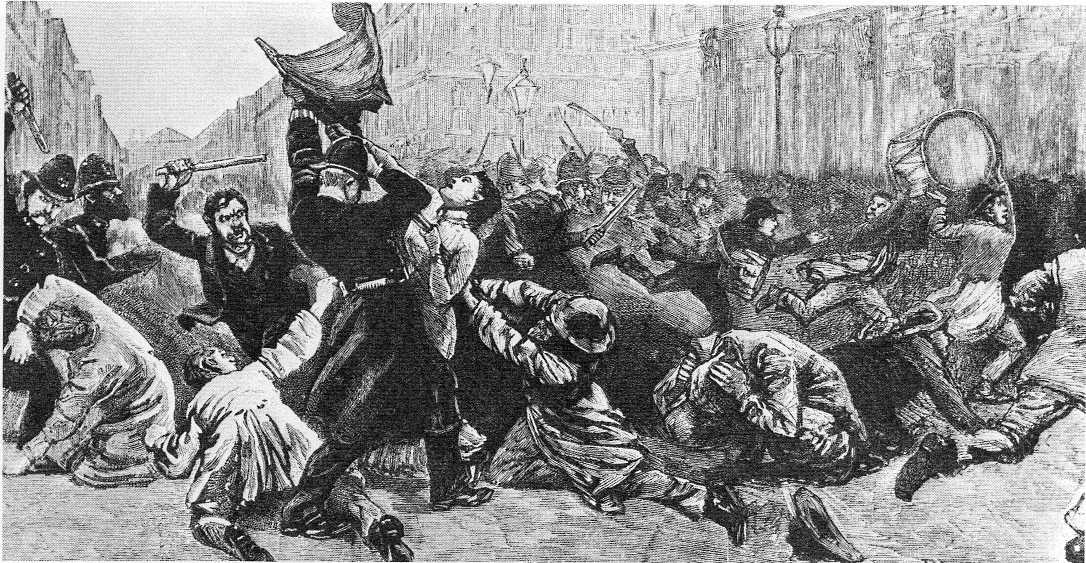
- Engraving from The Graphic (published 19 November 1887) depicting a policeman being clubbed by a demonstrator as he wrests a banner from "a Socialist woman leader, one Mrs. Taylor", while other people are covering their heads to protect themselves from raised police batons.
- Date: 13 November 1887
- Location: Trafalgar Square, London, England
- Caused by: Coercion in Ireland; Unemployment in Ireland; Arrest and imprisonment of William O'Brien; Long Depression
- Goals: Home Rule in Ireland; Release of William O'Brien
- Methods: Political demonstration

Parties
Social Democratic Federation; Irish National League; Fabian Society; Unaffiliated marchers	Metropolitan Police; British Army

Lead figures
John Burns; William Morris; Annie Besant; Cunninghame Graham	Charles Warren

Number
10,000–30,000 (est.)	Metropolitan Police: 2,000 British Army: 400

Casualties
- Injuries: 75 badly injured (all sides)
- Arrested: 400

Bloody Sunday was an event which took place in London, England on 13 November 1887, when a crowd of marchers protesting about unemployment and the Irish Coercion Acts, as well as demanding the release of MP William O'Brien, clashed with the Metropolitan Police. The demonstration was organised by the Social Democratic Federation and the Irish National League. Violent clashes took place between the police and demonstrators, many "armed with iron bars, knives, pokers and gas pipes". A contemporary report noted that 400 were arrested and 75 people were badly injured, including many police, two policemen being stabbed and one protester bayonetted.

== Background ==
Prime Minister William Gladstone's espousal of the cause of Irish home rule had split the Liberal Party and made it easy for the Conservatives to gain a majority in the House of Commons. The period from 1885 to 1906 was one of Tory dominance, with short intermissions. Coercion Acts were the answer of British governments perturbed by rural unrest in Ireland, and they involved various degrees of suspension of civil rights. Although one purpose of the 13 November demonstration was to protest about the handling of the Irish situation by the Conservative government of Lord Salisbury, it had a much wider context.

The Long Depression, starting in 1873 and lasting almost to the end of the century, created difficult social conditions in Britain—similar to the economic problems that drove rural agitation in Ireland. Falling food prices created rural unemployment, which resulted in both emigration and internal migration. Workers moved to the towns and cities in thousands, eroding employment, wages and working conditions. By November 1887, unemployed workers' demonstrations from the East End of London had been building up for more than two years. There had already been clashes with the police and with the members of upper-class clubs in Pall Mall, adjoining Trafalgar Square. The square was seen symbolically as the point at which the working-class East End met the upper-class West End of London, a focus of class struggle and an obvious flashpoint.

This attracted the attention of the small but growing socialist movement – the Marxists of both the Social Democratic Federation (SDF) and Socialist League, and the reformist socialists of the Fabian Society. Police and government attempts to suppress or divert the demonstrations also brought in the radical wing of the Liberal Party and free speech activists from the National Secular Society.

The working class in British cities contained many people of Irish birth or origin. London, like industrial areas of northern England and western Scotland, had a large Irish working class, concentrated in the East End, where it rubbed shoulders with increasing numbers of Jews from Eastern Europe.

== Demonstration of 13 November 1887 ==
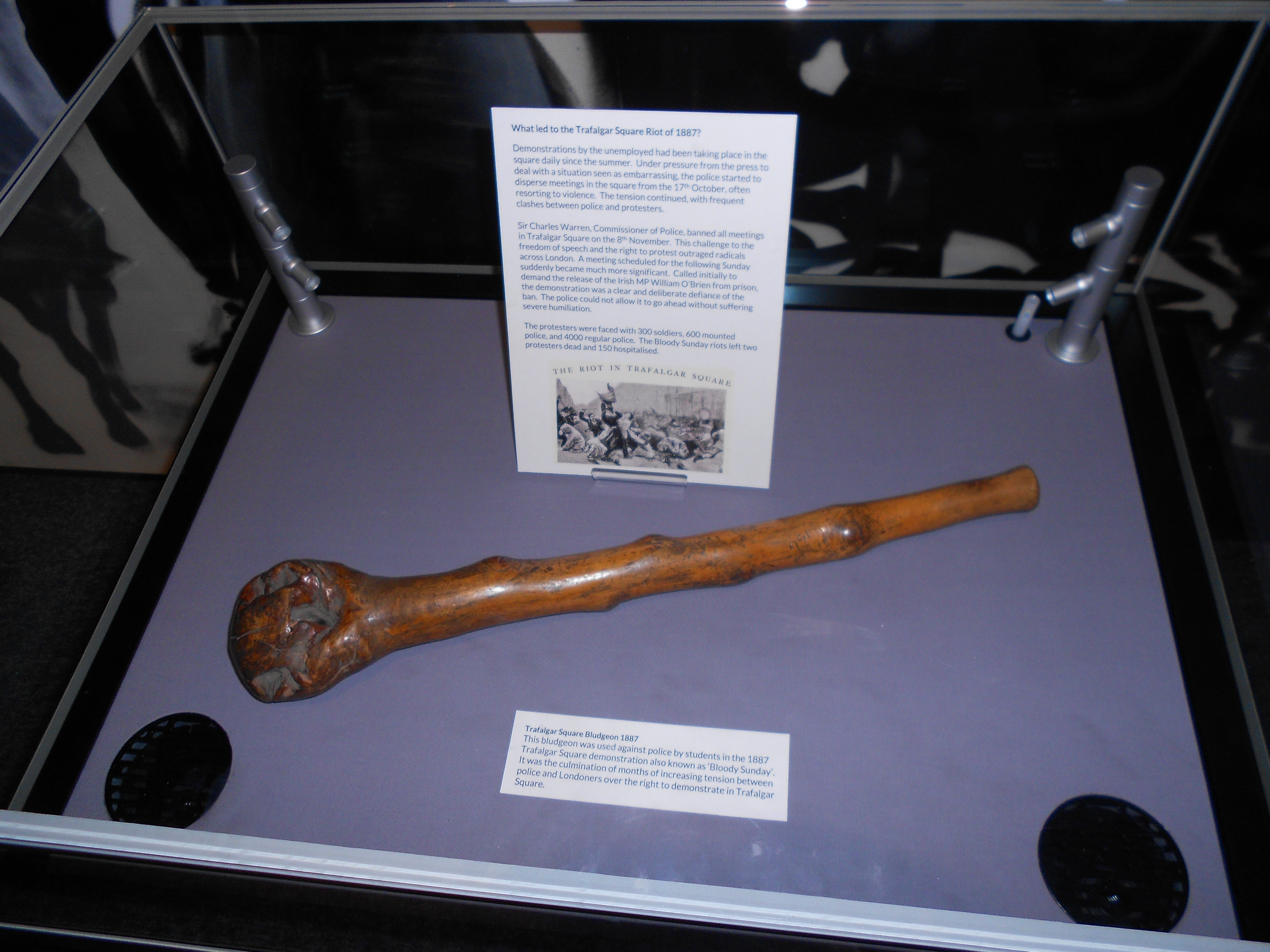
One of the bludgeons used by the rioters

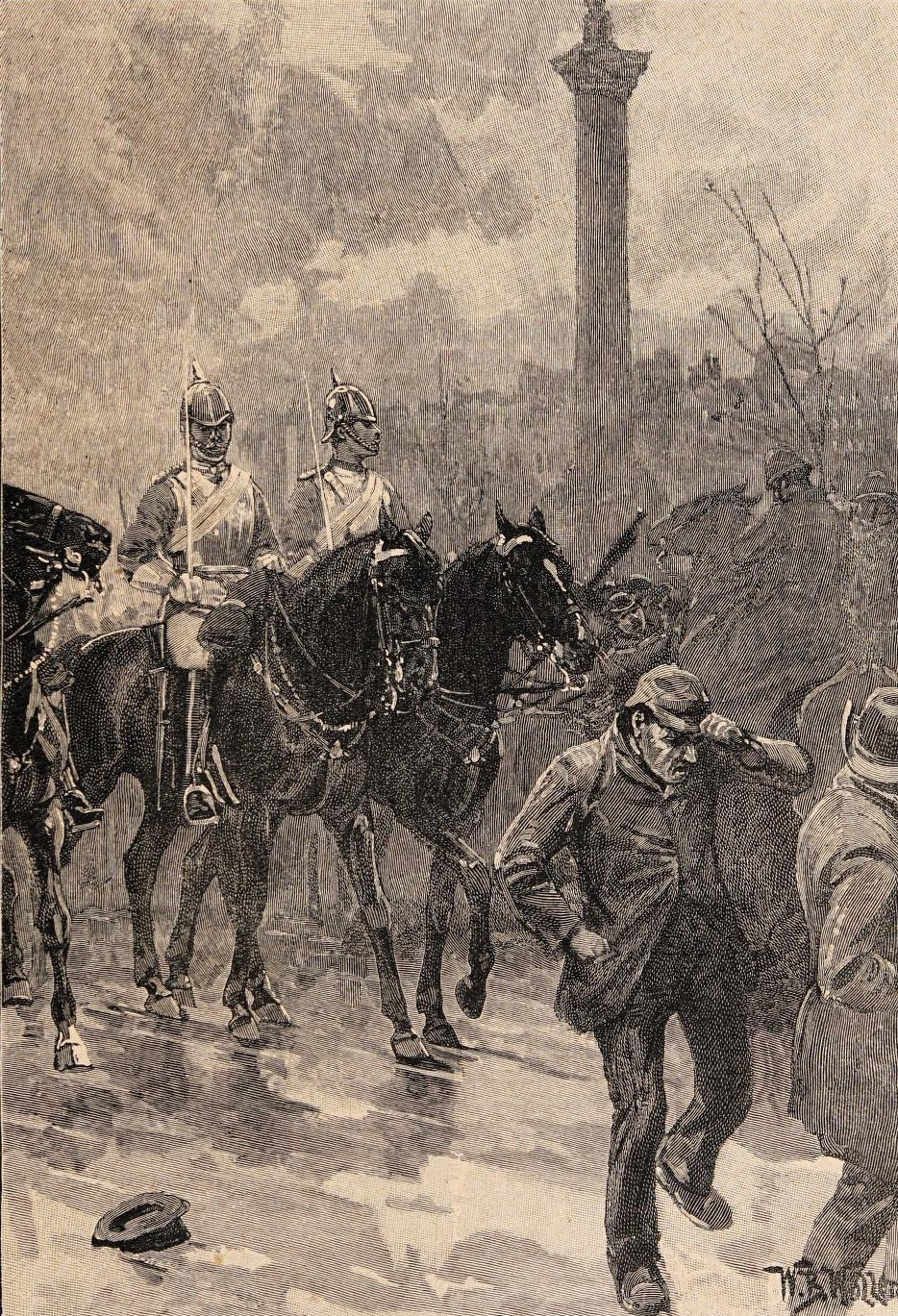
The Life Guards Holding Trafalgar Square

Some 30,000 people, "mostly respectable spectators", encircled Trafalgar Square as at least 10,000 protesters marched in from several different directions, led by (among others) Elizabeth Reynolds, John Burns, William Morris, Annie Besant and Robert Cunninghame-Graham, who were primarily leaders of the Social Democratic Federation. Also marching were the Fabian playwright George Bernard Shaw, Eleanor Marx, and Charlotte Wilson.

There were approximately 14,000 police officers for 5.5 million Londoners. Two thousand police and 400 troops were deployed to halt the demonstration. Burns and Cunninghame-Graham were arrested and imprisoned for six weeks. Annie Besant, who was a Marxist, Fabian and secularist, spoke at the rally and offered herself for arrest, but the police declined to do so. Of the 400 arrested, 50 were detained in custody.

At some point James Compton Merryweather, head of the firm Merryweather & Sons, and a Conservative supporter, offered to use a 400-gallons-per-minute steam fire engine as a water cannon of the day to clear the rioters from Trafalgar Square. However the Commissioner of the Metropolitan Police, Sir Charles Warren, declined.

In the fighting, many protestors were injured by police truncheons and under the hooves of police horses. Police Commissioner Warren had obtained from the army 400 soldiers; the infantry were marched into position with fixed bayonets but were not ordered to engage, and the cavalry were not ordered to draw swords. An Australian newspaper, of conservative political orientation, reported that the wounds received by the protestors were less severe than those of the constables.

== Aftermath ==
The following Sunday, 20 November, saw another demonstration and more casualties. According to a report in the partisan Socialist Review, among them was a young clerk named Alfred Linnell, who was run down by a police horse, dying in hospital a fortnight later from complications of a shattered thigh.

The funeral of Linnell on 18 December provided another focus for the unemployed and Irish movements. William Morris, leader of the Socialist League, gave the main speech and "advocated a holy war to prevent London from being turned into a huge prison". A smaller but similar event marked the burial of another of those killed, W. B. Curner, which took place in January. The release of those imprisoned was celebrated on 20 February 1888, with a large public meeting. Henry Hyndman, leader of the SDF, violently denounced the Liberal Party and the Radical MPs who were present.

The events of Bloody Sunday were witnessed by William Morris and the story recounted in his Utopian novel News from Nowhere (1890) as the protagonist William Guest discusses a "muddled account" of the 1887 riots.

== See also ==
- Belgian strikes of 1886

== Bibliography ==
- Thompson, E. P. William Morris: Romantic to Revolutionary, Merlin Press, London, 1977
- Taylor, Anne. Annie Besant: A Biography, Oxford University Press, 1991 (also US edition 1992) ISBN 0-19-211796-3
