= Laurence Patrick Byrne =

Irish journalist and literary critic

- Born: 1888
- Died: 1939 (aged 50–51)
- Occupation: Journalist

Laurence Patrick Byrne (1888–1939) was an Irish journalist and literary critic who wrote extensively on the Irish Literary Revival under the pen name Andrew E. Malone. Born and raised in Dublin, he worked for the Irish Agricultural Wholesale Society and Irish Agricultural Co-operative Society and was involved in the New Ireland journal run by Patrick Little, whom he introduced to co-operative managers from revolutionary Russia.

Kevin O'Shiel described Byrne as politically "a stable middle-of-the road man" and an admirer of "English Liberalism". He stood unsuccessfully for the Labour Party in the 1925 Seanad election.

== Bibliography ==
- Malone, Andrew E. (June 1918). "Irish Labour in War Time". Studies: An Irish Quarterly Review. 7 (26). Irish Province of the Society of Jesus: 319–327. JSTOR 30092667.
- Malone, Andrew E. (June 1919). "Co-operation in Italian Industry". The Irish Monthly. 47 (552). Irish Jesuit Province: 308–314. JSTOR 20505316.
- Malone, Andrew E. (June 1924). "The Plays of Lady Gregory". Studies: An Irish Quarterly Review. 13 (50). Irish Province of the Society of Jesus: 247–258. JSTOR 30087200.
- Malone, Andrew E. (September 1926). "A Great Irish Industry Messrs. Arthur Guinness, Son & Co., Ltd.: I. The History of the Industry". Studies: An Irish Quarterly Review. 15 (59). Irish Province of the Society of Jesus: 441–453. JSTOR 30082869.
- Malone, Andrew E. (March 1927). "A Great Irish Industry. Messrs. Arthur Guinness, Son & Co., Ltd.: II. Organisation, Management and Control". Studies: An Irish Quarterly Review. 16 (61). Irish Province of the Society of Jesus: 115–126. JSTOR 30094031.
- Malone, Andrew E. (September 1927). "A Great Irish Industry. Messrs. Arthur Guinness, Son & Co., Ltd.: III. The Labour Policy". Studies: An Irish Quarterly Review. 16 (63). Irish Province of the Society of Jesus: 465–476. JSTOR 30093802.
- Malone, Andrew E. (1928). "The Tardy Irish Drama". The English Journal. 17 (6): 469–480. doi:10.2307/803695. ISSN 0013-8274. JSTOR 803695.
- Henderson, Elmer J.; O’Neill, Joseph E.; Lynch, William F.; Malone, Andrew E. (1929). "The Conservatism of J. M. Barrie". Thought. 4 (1): 126–141. doi:10.5840/thought19294150. ISSN 0040-6457.
- Malone, Andrew E. (1929). The Irish Drama. New York: Scribner's Sons. OCLC 645005846.
- Malone, Andrew E. (1929). Donn Byrne: An Irish Realist. Sampson Low, Marston. OCLC 17293806. (about Brian Oswald Donn-Byrne)
- Malone, Andrew E. (1929). "Party Government in the Irish Free State". Political Science Quarterly. 44 (3). Academy of Political Science: 363–378. doi:10.2307/2142840. ISSN 0032-3195. JSTOR 2142840.
