= Frank Gallagher (author) =

Irish journalist, author & Volunteer (1893-1962)

Francis David Gallagher (1893–1962), also known by the pseudonym David Hogan, was an Irish journalist, author and Volunteer. Born in Cork, he was the son of James J. Gallagher, secretary to Dwyer & Co. Ltd. He was educated at Presentation Brothers College, Cork, Cork and for a short period at University College Cork.

== Journalist ==
As a young journalist, Gallagher was initially employed as London correspondent of William O'Brien's Cork Free Press, subsequently its final editor, though himself a separatist, personally admired O'Brien. The paper suffered closure in 1916 soon after the appointment of Lord Decies as Chief Press Censor for Ireland. Decies warned the press to be careful about what they published. Such warnings had little effect when dealing with such papers as the Cork Free Press. It was suppressed after Gallagher accused the British authorities of lying about the conditions and situation of Irish Republican prisoners in the Frongoch internment camp. Gallagher also contributed to the nationalist newspaper New Ireland.

== Volunteer ==
Following the Easter Rising of 1916, he joined the IRA, becoming an Officer in the 3rd battalion of the Dublin Brigade. Gallagher collaborated with Erskine Childers to publish the Irish Bulletin alongside the Republican publicity staff and fought alongside Éamon de Valera during the Irish War of Independence. Gallagher served as director of publicity for Sinn Féin in the days leading up to their landslide victory in the 1918 United Kingdom general election in Ireland Gallagher and Robert Brennan were the significant contributors to the Irish Bulletin which was produced at this time. He wrote several short stories for de Valera under various pseudonyms. Gallagher served long stints in prison due to his IRA involvement and went on many hunger strikes (the shortest lasting three days, the longest 41). In the 1920s Gallagher and thousands of other Irish Republican prisoners went on hunger strike to protest their internment without charges/trials and prison conditions. (See: 1923 Irish hunger strikes). Gallagher led approximately 100 interned men on a successful 14 day hunger strike demanding Prisoner of War status or release (they were released). In his day to day journal while on hunger strike, Gallagher writes about his motivations on the first day of the strike (April 5, 1920) in Mountjoy Prison on (Easter Monday): "There is a queer happiness in me. If it were not so quiet in this cell and in the whole jail, I would sing and call out in sheer gaiety of spirit...The fight is on, the fight that now can have but one ending...triumph and freedom, something done for liberty and the rights of all men."

== Later life ==
In December 1931, Gallagher was prosecuted by an Irish Free State Military tribunal for Seditious libel for publishing articles alleging Gardaí had mistreated the opponents (i.e. Anti-Treaty republicans) of the Irish Free State government, this was facilitated by Amendment No. 17 of Constitution of the Irish Free State, he was convicted and fined £50.

Prior to the establishment of Fianna Fáil, in the 1920s Gallagher contributed to An Phoblacht, the weekly newspaper of the Republican movement. He was subsequently de Valera's director of publicity and editor of The Irish Press in 1931 and was appointed deputy director of Radio Éireann in 1936. He would later serve as the director of the Government Information Bureau from 1939 to 1948 and again through 1951–54. Gallagher has composed numerous short stories, biographies and historical pieces.

From 1954 he worked at the National Library of Ireland up until his death on 16 July 1962, at which time he was working on a biography of de Valera. Portions of it were published posthumously as The Anglo-Irish Treaty (1965). Gallagher's implacable hostility to the Anglo-Irish Treaty inevitably colours his analysis; but despite his belief that de Valera was entirely in the right in the ensuing conflict, he makes impressive efforts to be fair to those who negotiated the Treaty, especially Arthur Griffith. He published Days of Fear (1928) and under the pseudonym 'David Hogan', The Four Glorious Years (1953).
