= A History of Banking in All the Leading Nations =

A History of Banking in all the Leading Nations
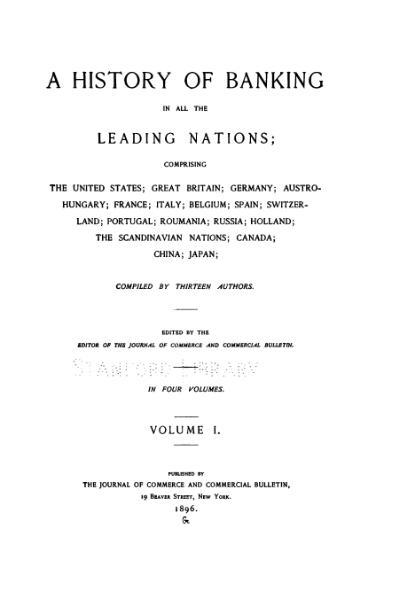
- Title page of volume 1 of A History of Banking in all the Leading Nations
- Author: thirteen authors; edited by William Dodsworth
- Language: English
- Subject: History of banking
- Publisher: The Journal of Commerce
- Publication date: 1896 (reprinted 1971)
- ISBN: 0-678-00554-0

A History of Banking in all the Leading Nations, first published in 1896 by The Journal of Commerce, is a four-volume history of banking in North America, Europe, China and Japan. At the time of publication it was described as "the largest and most expensive treatise on banking yet published". Thirteen authors contributed to the work, all of whom were considered "eminent as bankers, financiers and political economists". The title page bears the notice "Edited by the Editor of The Journal of Commerce and Commercial Bulletin" (i.e. William Dodsworth).

The first volume, dedicated to the history of banking in the United States, was written by William Graham Sumner (who in many library catalogues is mistakenly listed as the editor of the series).

The second volume contains a history of banking in Great Britain, by Henry Dunning Macleod, and in the Russian Empire, by Antoine E. Horn, editor of the Journal de St.-Pétersbourg, as well as a contribution on "Savings Banks in the United States" by John P. Townsend, president of the Bowery Savings Bank.

The third volume provides contributions on the history of banking in the "Latin Nations" by Pierre des Essars (covering France, Italy, Spain, Belgium, Switzerland and Portugal), in Alsace-Lorraine by Arthur Raffalovich, and in Canada by Byron Edmund Walker.

The fourth volume contains chapters on banking in Germany and Austria-Hungary by Max Wirth, in The Netherlands by Richard van der Borght, in the Scandinavian nations (Denmark, Sweden, and Norway) by the Danish economist and statistician Adolph Jensen, on Japan by Juichi Soyeda, and on China by Thomas R. Jernigan, American consul general in Shanghai.
