= Soeda Juichi =

Japanese banker (1864–1929)

Juichi Soyeda
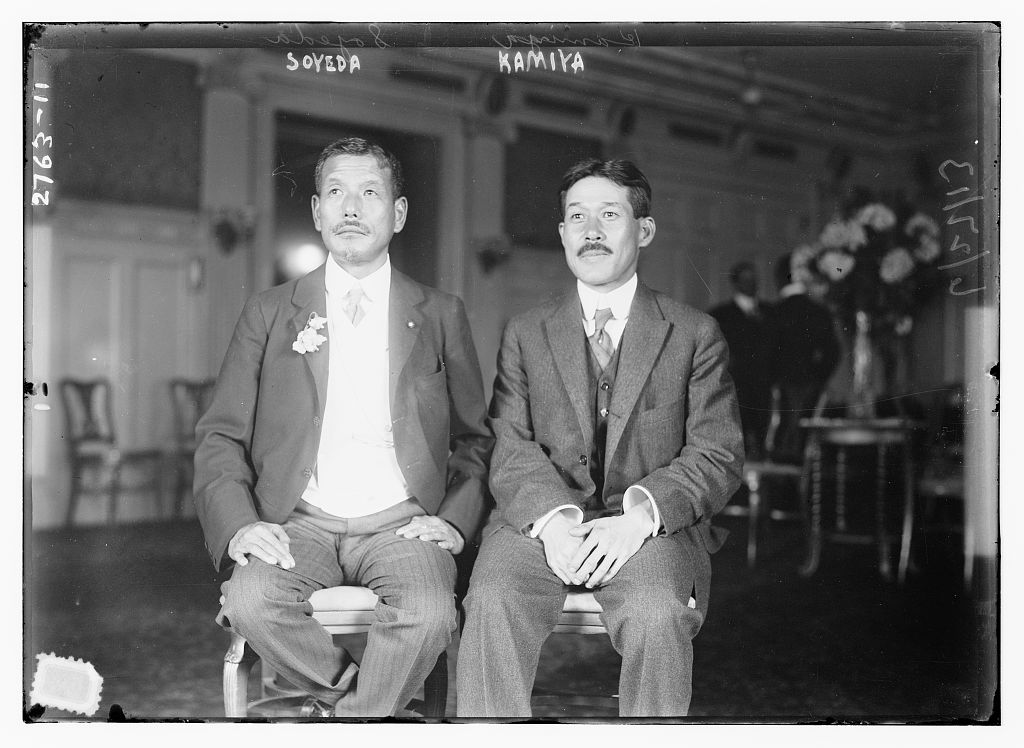
- Born: September 15, 1864; Fukuoka, Japan
- Died: July 4, 1929 (aged 64); Japan
- Education: Tokyo Imperial University; Cambridge University; University of Heidelberg
- Occupations: Lawyer, civil servant, economist

Soeda Juichi (添田 壽一; September 15, 1864 – July 4, 1929), also referred to as Juichi Soyeda, was a Japanese lawyer, senior civil servant and academic economist. In 1913 he was delegated by the Tokyo Chamber of Commerce in Japan to study the California Alien Land Law of 1913.

== Biography ==
He was born in Fukuoka on September 15, 1864. He graduated from School of Politics and Economics at Tokyo Imperial University in 1884, and continued his studies at Cambridge University and University of Heidelberg, He returned to Japan in 1887. That same year he was appointed councilor in the Japanese Treasury Department, and then successively private secretary, secretary, and Director of Superintendence Bureau, in the same department; became its Vice-Minister in 1898; shortly afterwards he resigned his post and became lecturer of economics and public finance at Tokyo Imperial University and several other institutions; in 1899, was appointed president of the Bank of Formosa; then chairman of Japan Credit Mobilier Commission, and in 1902, was made president of the newly established Japan Credit Mobilier. He was for many years Japan correspondent of the Economic Journal. He took an active part in Japanese monetary reform work, including the adoption of the gold standard in 1897. In 1913, he visited the United States as representative of the Tokyo Chamber of Commerce, in connection with the California Alien Land Law of 1913.

He died on July 4, 1929.

== Publications ==
- A survey of the Japanese question in California (1913)
- A History of Banking in Japan. 2002 reprint; first published in 1896 as one part of A History of Banking in all the Leading Nations, "edited by the editor of the Journal of Commerce and Commercial Bulletin" (i.e. William Dodsworth).
