= William O'Brien (Irish nationalist politician) =

Irish nationalist journalist and politician

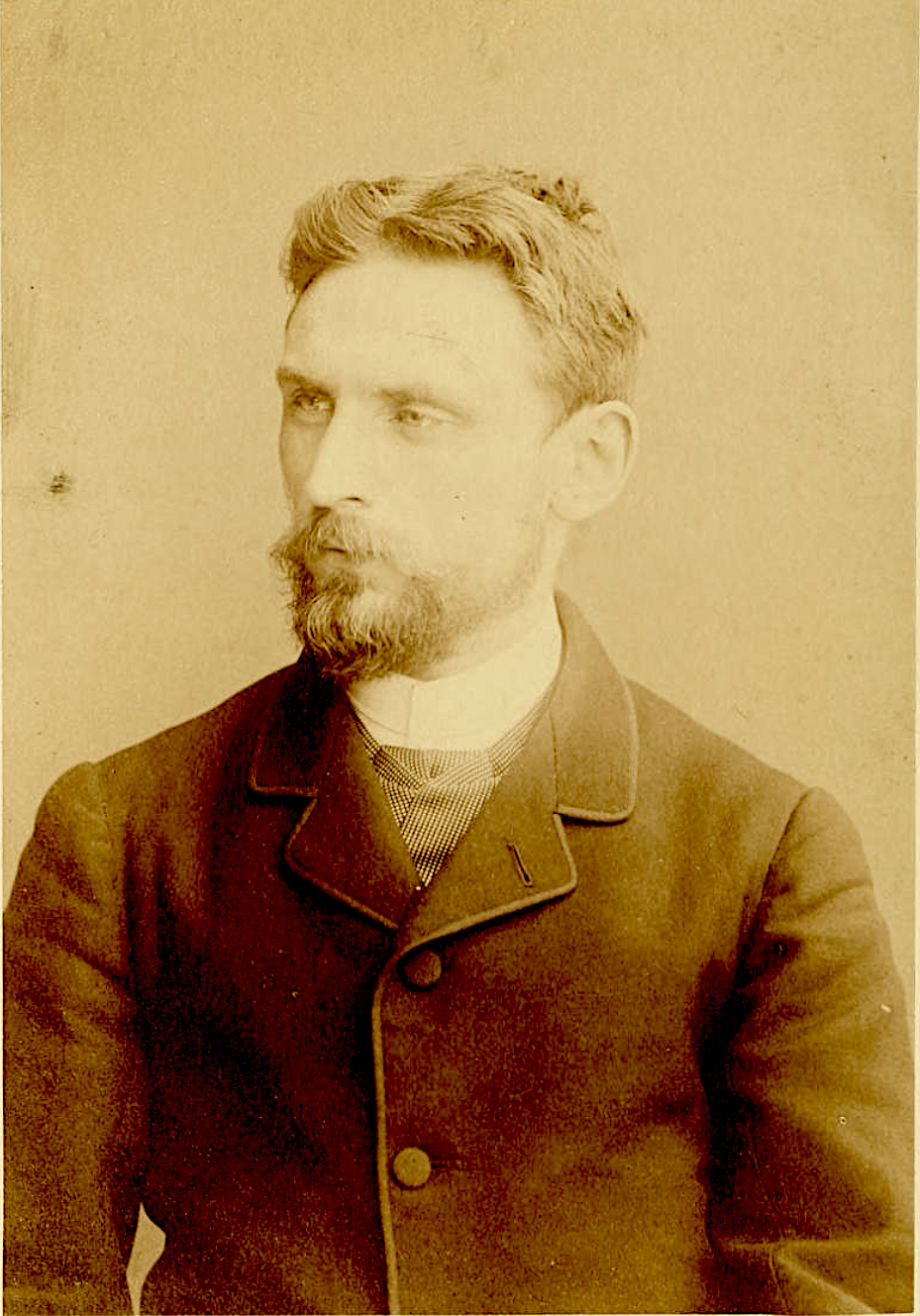
- O'Brien c. 1887

Member of Parliament
- In office 27 January 1910 – 25 November 1918
- Preceded by: William Abraham
- Succeeded by: Liam de Róiste; J. J. Walsh
- Constituency: North East Cork (1910); Cork City (1910–1918)
- In office 19 August 1904 – 1909
- Preceded by: Himself
- Succeeded by: Maurice Healy
- Constituency: Cork City
- In office 4 October 1900 – 1 January 1904
- Preceded by: Maurice Healy
- Succeeded by: Himself
- Constituency: Cork City
- In office 16 May 1887 – 1895
- Preceded by: Edmund Leamy
- Succeeded by: J. F. X. O'Brien
- Constituency: North East Cork (1887–1892); Cork City (1892–1895)
- In office 24 January 1883 – 1886
- Preceded by: William Moore Johnson
- Succeeded by: Thomas Russell
- Constituency: Mallow (1883–1885); Tyrone South (1885–1886)

Personal details
- Born: 2 October 1852 Mallow, County Cork, Ireland
- Died: 25 February 1928 (aged 75) London, England
- Party: Irish Parliamentary Party; United Irish League; Irish National Federation; All-for-Ireland League

William O'Brien (2 October 1852 – 25 February 1928) was an Irish nationalist, journalist, agrarian agitator, social revolutionary, politician, party leader, newspaper publisher, author and Member of Parliament (MP) in the House of Commons of the United Kingdom of Great Britain and Ireland. He was particularly associated with the campaigns for land reform in Ireland during the late 19th and early 20th centuries as well as his conciliatory approach to attaining Irish Home Rule.

== Family, education ==
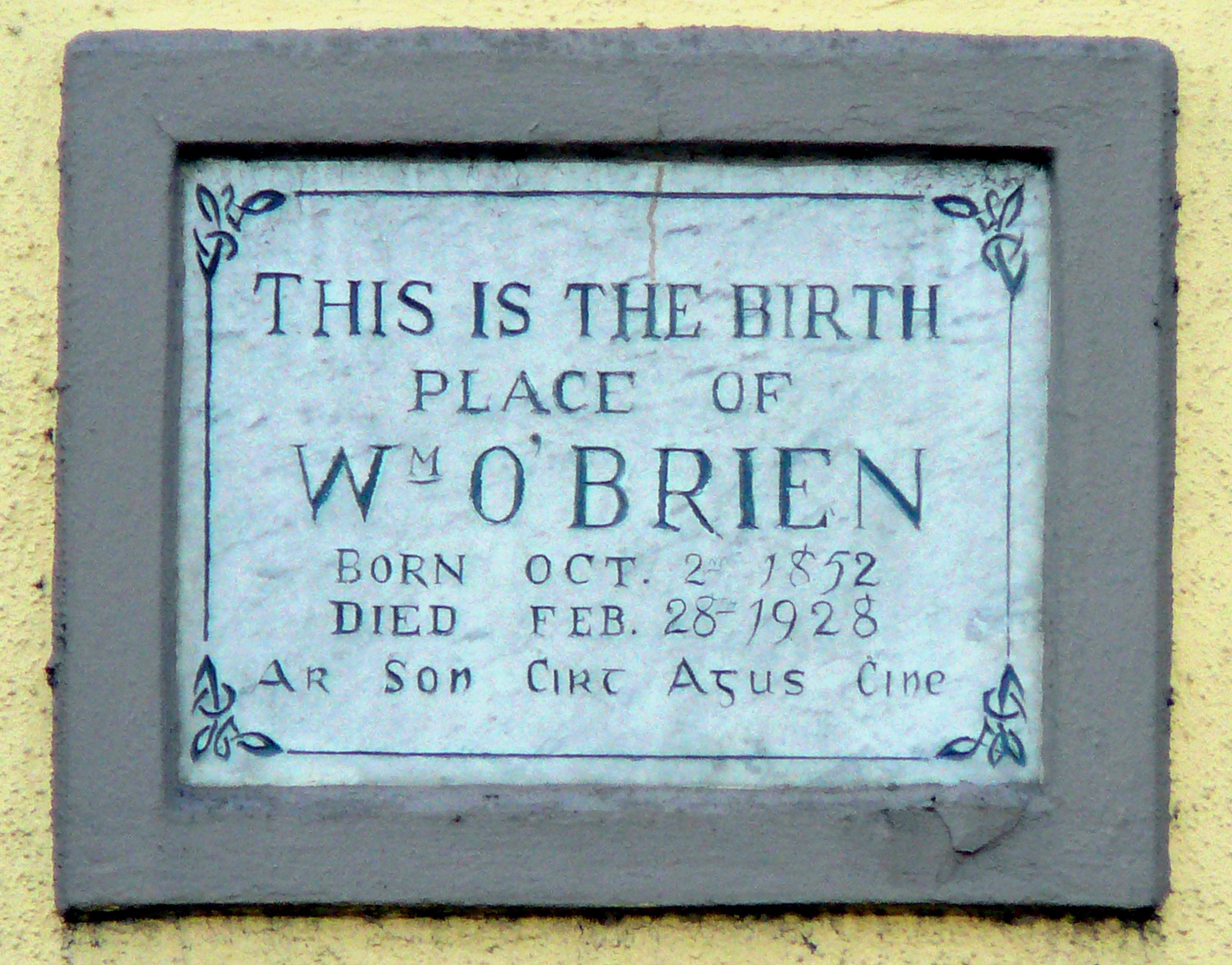
Birthplace plaque, Thomas Davis Street, Mallow, County Cork

William O'Brien was born at Bank Place in Mallow, County Cork, as the second son of James O'Brien, a solicitor's clerk, and his wife Kate, the daughter of James Nagle, a local shopkeeper. On his mother's side, he was descended from the distinguished Norman family of Nagles, long settled in the vicinity of Mallow giving their name to the nearby Nagle Mountains. He was also linked through his mother with the statesman Edmund Burke's mother's family, as well as with the poet Edmund Spenser's family. The Nagles however, no longer held the status or prosperity they once had. In the same month thirty-eight years earlier Thomas Davis was born in Mallow. O'Brien's advocacy of the cause of Irish Independence was to be in the same true tradition of his esteemed fellow townsman. Following in his footsteps he acknowledged the existence of many strands of Irishness.

O'Brien shared his primary education with a townsman with whom he was later to have a close political connection, Canon Sheehan of Doneraile. He enjoyed his secondary education at the Cloyne diocesan college, which resulted in his being brought up in an environment noted for its religious tolerance. He greatly valued having had this experience from an early age, which strongly influenced his later views on the need for such tolerance in Irish national life.

== Early journalism ==
Financial misfortune in 1868 caused the O'Brien family to move to Cork City. A year later his father died, and the illness of his elder and younger brother and his sister resulted in him having to support his mother and siblings. Always a prolific writer, it quickly earned him a job as a newspaper reporter, first for the Cork Daily Herald. This was to be the primary career which first attracted attention to him as a public figure. He had begun legal studies at Queen's College, later University College Cork, but although he never graduated, he held a lifelong attachment to the institution, to which he bequeathed his private papers.

== Political origins ==
From an early age O'Brien's political ideas, like most of his contemporaries, were shaped by the Fenian movement and the plight of the Irish tenant farmers, his elder brother having participated in the rebellion of 1867. It resulted in O'Brien himself becoming actively involved with the Fenian brotherhood, resigning in the mid-1870s, because of what he described in 'Evening Memories' (p. 443–4) as "the gloom of inevitable failure and horrible punishment inseparable from any attempt at separation by force of arms".

As a journalist, his attention was attracted in the first place to the suffering of the tenant farmers. Now on the staff of the Freeman's Journal, after touring the Galtee Mountains around Christmas 1877 he published articles describing their conditions. They are generally acknowledged as the earliest example of investigative journalism in Ireland. They later appeared in pamphlet form. With this action, he first displayed his belief that only through parliamentary reform and with the new power of the press that public opinion could be influenced to pursue Irish issues constitutionally through open political activity and the ballot box. Not least of all, responding to the hopes of the new Irish Home Rule movement.

== United Ireland Editor ==
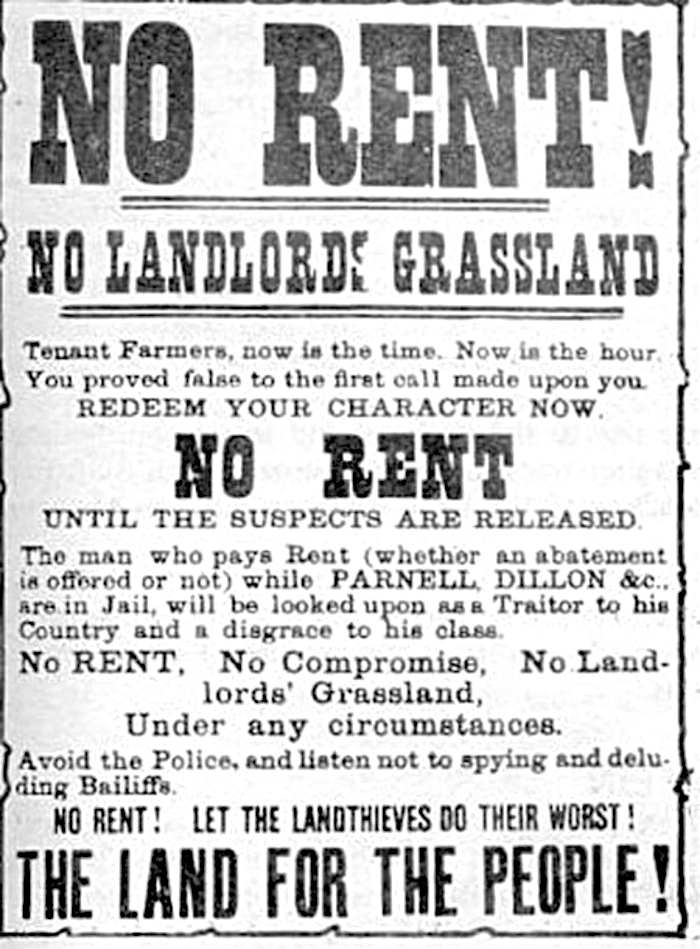
Land War manifesto

In 1878 he met Charles Stewart Parnell MP at a Home Rule meeting. Parnell recognised his exceptional talents as a journalist and writer, influencing his rise to becoming a leading politician of the new generation. He subsequently appointed him in 1881 as editor of the Irish National Land League's journal, United Ireland. His association with Parnell and the Irish Parliamentary Party (IPP) led to his arrest and imprisonment with Parnell, Dillon, Willie Redmond and other nationalist leaders in Kilmainham Gaol that October.

During his imprisonment until April 1882 he drafted the Land War No Rent Manifesto – a rent-withholding scheme personally led by O'Brien, escalating the conflict between the Land League and Gladstone's government.

== Agitator and MP ==
From 1883 to 1885 O'Brien was elected MP for Mallow. Following the abolition of that constituency he represented Tyrone South from 1885 to 1886, North East Cork from 1887 to 1892, and Cork City from 1892 to 1895 and from 1901 to 1918, in the House of Commons. There were three periods of absence: 1886–87, from 1895 to 1900, and eight months in 1904. Amid the turmoil of Irish politics in the late 19th century he was frequently arrested and imprisoned for his support for various Land League protests. With John Dillon and Timothy Harrington, he was a member of League's "the de facto military council".

In 1884, through the newspaper United Ireland he incited a sensational homosexual scandal involving officers at Dublin Castle.

In 1887 O'Brien, author, in 1882, of the No Rent Manifesto helped to organise a rent strike with John Mandeville during the Plan of Campaign at the estate of Lady Kingston near Mitchelstown, County Cork. On 9 September, after an 8,000-strong demonstration led by John Dillon MP, three estate tenants were shot dead, and others wounded, by police at the town's courthouse where O'Brien had been brought for trial with Mandeville on charges of incitement under a new Coercion Act. This event became known as the Mitchelstown Massacre. Later that year, thousands of demonstrators marched in London to demand his release from prison and clashed with police at Trafalgar Square on Bloody Sunday (13 November).

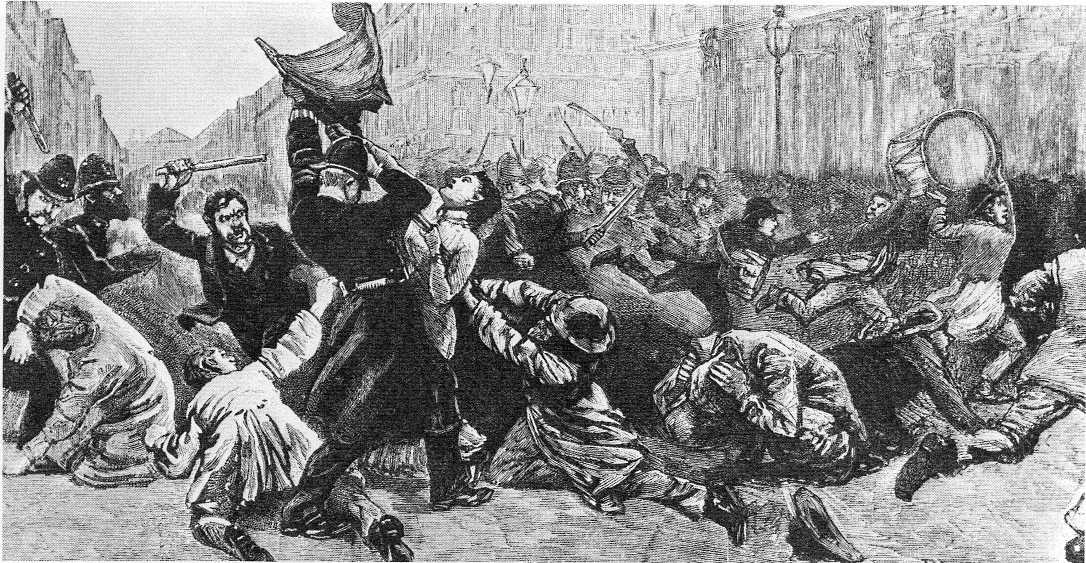
Bloody Sunday (1887)

Even in prison, O'Brien continued his protests, refusing to wear prison uniform in 1887. Being left without clothes, a Blarney tweed suit was smuggled in. He occasionally wore this much-publicised suit in the Commons when confronting his incarcerator, Arthur Balfour. His imprisonment also inspired protests – notably the 1887 'Bloody Sunday' riots in London. In 1889 he escaped from a courtroom but was sentenced in absentia for conspiracy. He fled to America accompanied by Dillon who was on bail, then to France where both held negotiations with Parnell at Boulogne-sur-Mer over the leadership of the party. When these broke down, both returned to Folkestone giving themselves up, subsequently serving four months in Clonmel Gaol and Galway Gaol. Here O'Brien began to reconsider his political future, having already been prosecuted nine times over the years, using the time to write an acclaimed novel, a Fenian romance with a land reform theme set in 1860: When We Were Boys, which was published in 1890.

== Marriage, reorientation ==
In 1890 he married Sophie Raffalovich, sister of the poet Marc André Sebastian Raffalovich and the economist Arthur Raffalovich, and daughter of the Russian Jewish banker, Hermann Raffalowich, domiciled in Paris. It was to mark a major turning point in O'Brien's personal and political life. His wife brought considerable wealth into the marriage, enabling him to act with political independence and providing finances to establish his own newspapers. His wife (1860–1960) who survived him by over 30 years, gave him considerable moral and emotional support for his political pursuits. Their relationship added to his life an abiding love for France and attachment to Europe, where he often retired to recuperate.

By 1891 he had become disillusioned with Parnell's political leadership, although emotionally loyal to him he tried to persuade him to retire after the O'Shea divorce case. On Parnell's death that year and the ensuing IPP split, he remained aloof from aligning himself with either faction, either the rump Parnellite Irish National League (INL) led by John Redmond MP or with the anti-Parnellite Irish National Federation (INF) group under John Dillon, although he saw the weight of strength in the latter. O'Brien worked hard in the 1893 negotiations leading to the passage by the Commons of Gladstone's Second Home Rule Bill; however, the Bill was rejected by the Lords.

== United Irish League ==
Distancing himself from the party turmoils, he retired from Parliament in 1895, settling for a while with his wife near Westport, County Mayo, which enabled him to experience at first-hand from his Mayo retreat the distressed hardship of the peasantry in the West of Ireland, trying to eke out an existence in its rocky landscape.

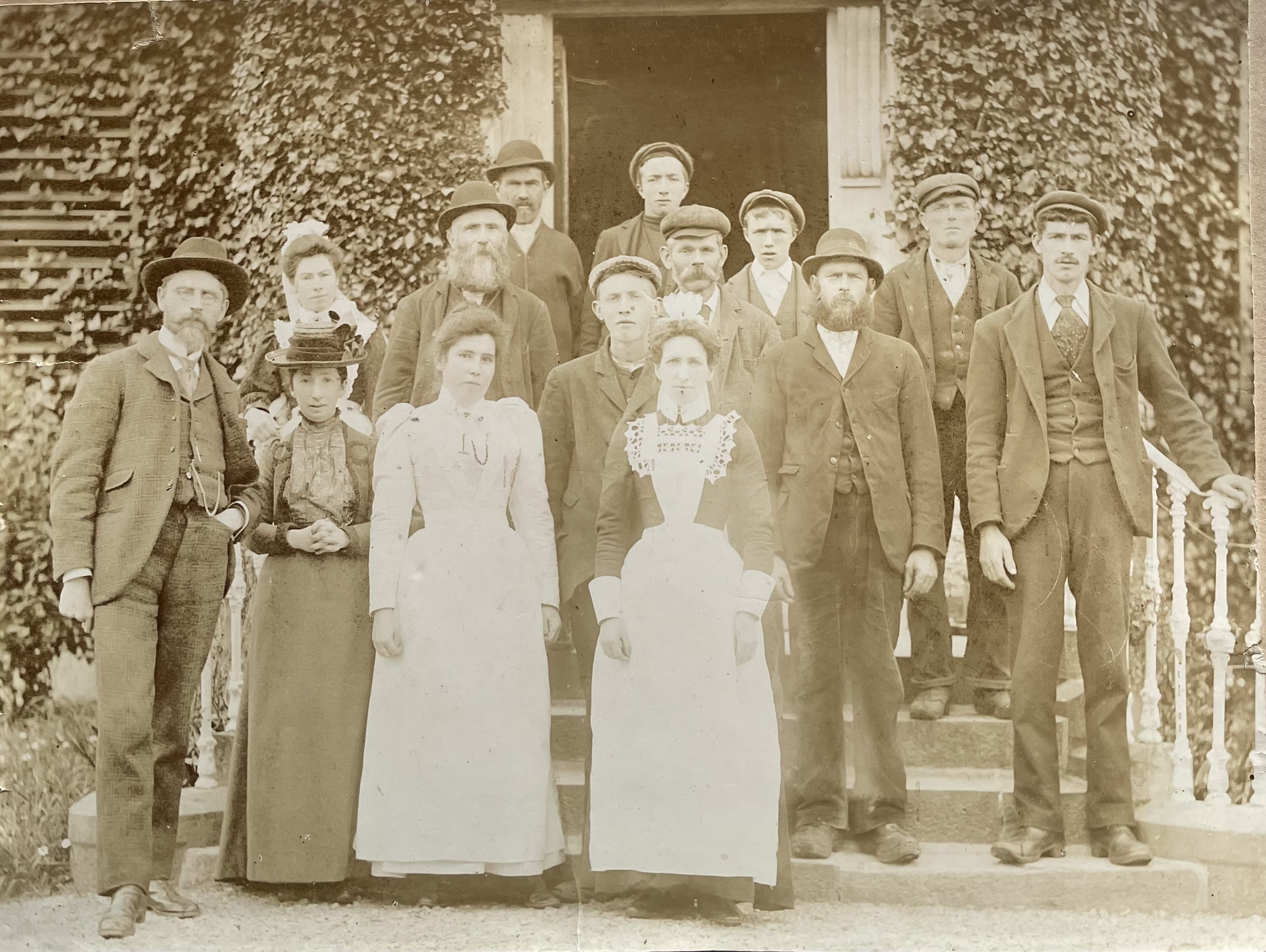
William O'Brien, Sophie Raffalovich O'Brien and their staff at Mallow Cottage, Clooneen, Westport, County Mayo

Believing strongly that agitational politics combined with constitutional pressures were the best means of achieving objectives, O'Brien established on the 16 January 1898 the United Irish League (UIL) at Westport, with Michael Davitt as co-founder and John Dillon present. It was to be a new grass-roots organisation with a programme to include agrarian agitation, political reform and Home Rule. It coincided with the passing of the revolutionary Local Government (Ireland) Act 1898 which broke the power of the landlord-dominated "Grand Juries", passing for the first time absolute democratic control of local affairs into the hands of the people through elected Local County Councils.

The UIL was explicitly designed to reconcile the various parliamentary fragments existing since the Parnell split, which proved very popular, its branches sweeping over most of the country organised by its general secretary John O'Donnell, dictating to the demoralised Irish party leaders the terms for reconstruction, not only of the party but the nationalist movement in Ireland. The movement was backed by O'Brien's new newspaper The Irish People.

Around 1900 O'Brien, an unbending social reformer and agrarian agitator, was the most influential and powerful figure within the nationalist movement, although not formally its leader. His UIL was by far the largest organisation in the country, comprising 1150 branches and 84,355 members. The result of the rapid growth of his UIL as a national organisation in achieving unity through organised popular opinion, was to effect a quick defensive reunion of the discredited IPP factions of the INL and the INF, largely fearing O'Brien's return to the political field. He can nevertheless be regarded as the architect of the settlement of 1900. The unity under John Redmond disturbed O'Brien, as it resulted in most of the ineffective party candidates being re-elected in the 1900 general election, preventing the UIL from using its power in the pre-selection of candidates. Within a few years, the IPP was, however, to tactically adjunct the UIL under its wing manoeuvering it out of O'Brien's control.

== Land Act architect ==
O'Brien next intensified the UIL agitation for land purchase by tenant farmers, pressing for compulsory purchase. He formed an alliance with constructive unionists which resulted in the calling of the December 1902 Land Conference, an initiative by moderate landlords led by Lord Dunraven for a settlement by conciliatory agreement between landlord and tenant. The tenant representation was led by O'Brien, the others were John Redmond, Timothy Harrington and T. W. Russell for the Ulster tenants. After six sittings all eight tenants' demands were conceded (one with compromise), O'Brien having guided the official nationalist movement into endorsement of a new policy of "conference plus business". He followed this by campaigning vigorously for the greatest piece of social legislation Ireland had yet seen, orchestrating the Land Purchase (Ireland) Act 1903 through parliament, which effectively ended landlordism, solving the age-old Irish Land Question.

The Act's agreement on land purchase between tenants and landlords resulted in a rush of landlords to sell and of tenants to buy. Though the Act was approved by Redmond, his deputy Dillon disliked the Act because he opposed any co-operation with landlords, while Michael Davitt objected to peasant proprietorship under the Act, demanding land nationalisation. Together with Thomas Sexton editor of the party's Freeman's Journal, all three campaigned against O'Brien, fiercely attacking him for putting Land Purchase and Conciliation before Home Rule. O'Brien appealed to Redmond to suppress their opposition but his call went unheeded. Declaring that he was making no headway with his policy, he resigned his Parliamentary seat in November 1903, closed down his paper the Irish People and left the party for the next five years. It was a serious setback for the party. It also turned once intimate friends into mortal enemies. His Cork electorate, however, insisted on pushing through his re-election eight months later in August 1904. O'Brien had failed in his intention of shocking the party to its senses.

During 1904 O'Brien had already embarked on advancing full-scale implementation of the Act in alliance with D. D. Sheehan MP and his Irish Land and Labour Association (ILLA) when they formed the Cork Advisory Committee to help tenants in their negotiations. Their collaboration became the new organisational base for O'Brien's political activities. This new alliance aggravated the Dillonite section of the IPP further. Determined to destroy both of them "before they poison the whole country", Dillon and the party published regular denunciations in the Freeman's Journal, then coupéd O'Brien's UIL with the appointment of its new secretary, Dillon's chief lieutenant, Joseph Devlin MP, Grandmaster of the Ancient Order of Hibernians, Devlin eventually gaining organisational control over the entire UIL and IPP organisations.

O'Brien had in the meantime engaged with the Irish Reform Association, together with Sir Anthony MacDonnell, a Mayo Catholic originally appointed by Wyndham, and head of the Civil Service in Dublin Castle, anxious to do something for Ireland. MacDonnell helped the reform group to draft a scheme on the possible extension of the principle of self-government for Ireland. On 31 August 1904 the Reform Association released a preliminary report calling for the devolution of larger powers of local government for Ireland. The limited scheme was quickly and equally condemned by O'Brien's opponents, who regarded it nevertheless as a step in the right direction.

== Macroom programme ==
After the financing of tenant land purchase, tenant farmers were now proud proprietors largely in control of local government. The next issue was to provide extensive rural housing for the tens of thousands of migrant farm labourers struggling to survive in stone cabins, barns or mud hovels. This was a long-standing demand by the ILLA branches and D.D. Sheehan. In 1904 O'Brien then joined forces with Sheehan's ILLA organisation, identifying himself with labourer's grievances and Sheehan's demand for agricultural labourers' housing, who up to then were dependent on limited provision of cottages by local County Councils or landowners at unfavourable terms.

Following large demonstrations addressed by O'Brien and his friends during 1904 which fought and won the field in Charleville and Macroom (County Cork), Kilfinane and Dromcolliher (County Limerick), Tralee and Castleisland (County Kerry), Scariff (County Clare), Goolds Cross (County Tipperary) and Ballycullane (County Wexford), a breakthrough occurred when a scheme was made public at "the largest labour demonstration ever held in Ireland" (Cork Examiner), a memorable rally in Macroom on Sunday 11 December 1904 addressed by William O'Brien. Preaching a gospel of social justice, his concepts became known as the Macroom programme. O'Brien grasped the prime importance of its principles and measures when during 1905 he pressed and negotiated together with support from Sir Anthony MacDonnell (the Under-Secretary for Ireland) for what was subsequently carried into law and after the January 1906 general election became the ground-breaking Labourers (Ireland) Act 1906.

== Housing drive ==
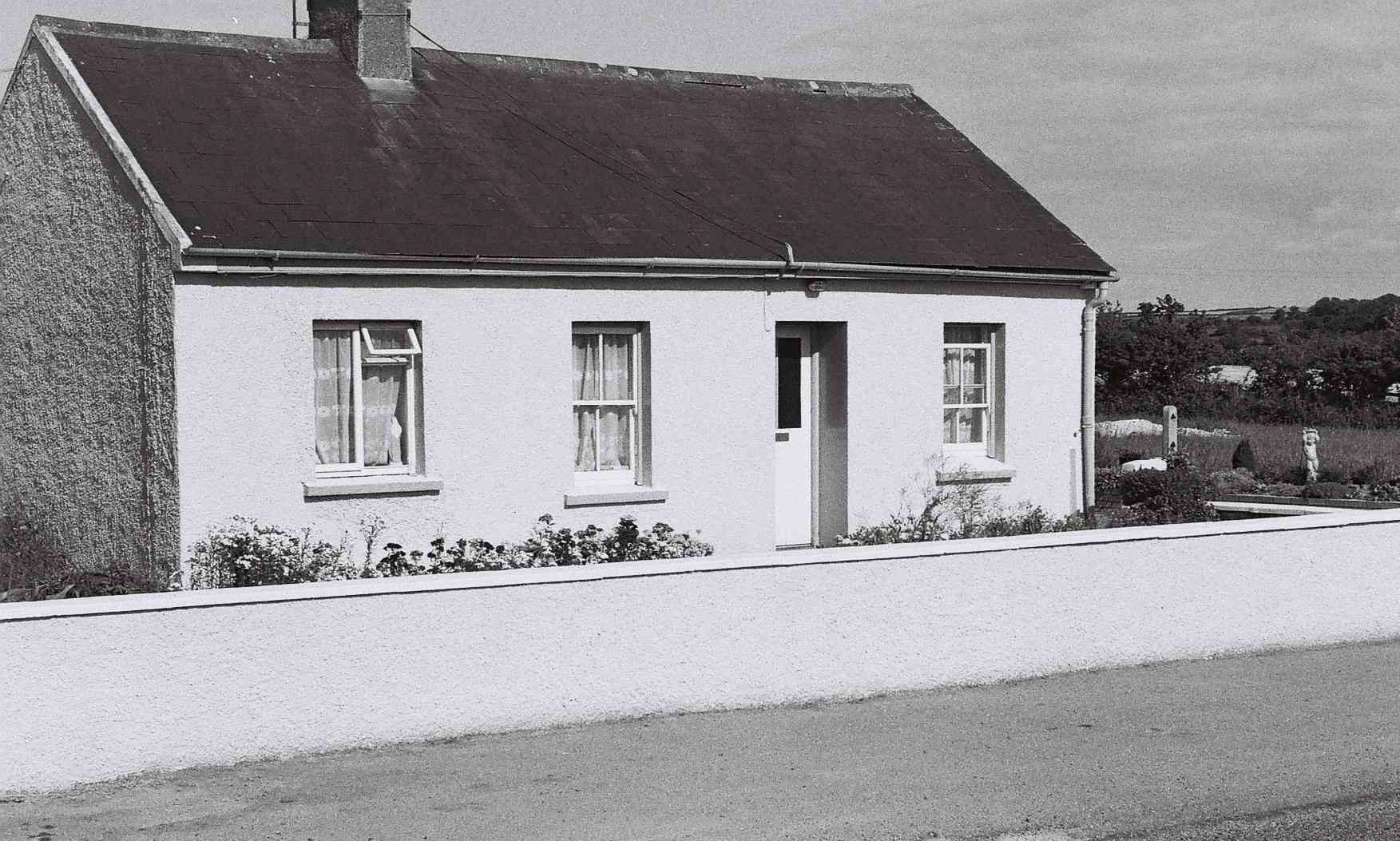
Labourers Act cottages

The second phase of the Labourers Acts (1906–1914) began after the 1906 Labourers Housing Act, long demanded by the ILLA, was implemented, for which both the Redmondite and O'Brienite factions were zealous in claiming credit. The labourer-owned cottages erected by the Local County Councils brought about a major socio-economic transformation, by simultaneously erasing the previous inhuman habitations. O'Brien saying that the Labourers Acts – "were scarcely less wonderworking than the abolition of landlordism itself". In 1904 Davitt going so far as to declare the foreseen Labourers Act constituted – "a rational principle of state Socialism". This Act had enormous positive long-term consequences for rural Irish society.

The so-called 'Labourers Act' provided large-scale funding for extensive state-sponsored housing to accommodate rural labourers and others of the working classes. The programme financed and produced during the course of the next five years, the erection of over 40,000 working-class cottages, each on an acre of land, a complete 'municipalisation' of commodious dwellings dotting the rural Irish countryside. This unique social housing programme unparalleled anywhere else in Europe brought about an unsurpassed agrarian revolution, changing the face of the Irish landscape, much to O'Brien's expressed delight.

Renewed publication of O'Brien's newspaper The Irish People (1905–1909) exalting the cottage building, its editorials equally countermanding the IPPs' "Dublin bosses" attempts to curtail the programme, fearing settled rural communities would no longer be dependent on Party and Church. Munster took full advantage, erecting most of the cottages, and additional funding provided for a further 5,000 houses under Birrell's Labourers (Ireland) Act 1911. The bulk of the labourers' cottages were erected by 1916, resulting in a widespread decline of rampant tuberculosis, typhoid and scarlet fever.

== Turbulent times ==
In the interest of political unity, O'Brien and other excluded MPs temporarily rejoined the Parliamentary Party when Redmond summoned a unity meeting in the Mansion House, Dublin in April 1908. Later that year, during negotiations for additional funding of land purchase under an amending bill, Redmond called a further UIL National Convention for 9 February 1909 in Dublin to regulate the issues, claiming the bill over-burdened the British Treasury and the ratepayers. Over 3000 delegates attended. Devlin had the hall filled in advance with forces of his 'militant Mollies', so that when O'Brien and his followers tried to speak in favour of the bill, they were battened into silence. The convention was then dubbed the 'Baton' Convention by O'Brien. It was "probably the stormiest meeting ever held by constitutional nationalists".

The bill eventually passed into law as Birrell's Land Purchase Act 1909, but fell far short in its financial provisions.

As an outcome of the "Baton Convention" O'Brien felt himself again driven from the party. He foresaw that the IPP, undermined by the AOH, was on a fatal radical path which would frustrate any All-Ireland Home Rule settlement. As a countermeasure, he set about establishing a new League, which was to build on the success his combined "doctrine of conciliation" with "conference plus business" achieved during the 1902 Land Conference with landlords and the ensuing 1903 Land Purchase Act. Following his engagement with the Irish Reform Movement 1904-5 and support of the 1907 Irish Council Bill which he viewed as a step in the right direction, or "Home Rule by instalments", he firmly believed all moderate unionists could still be won over to All-Ireland Home Rule. For many nationalists on the other hand, the adoption of a conciliatory approach to the "hereditary enemy" involved too sharp a deviation from traditional thinking.

== All-for-Ireland League ==
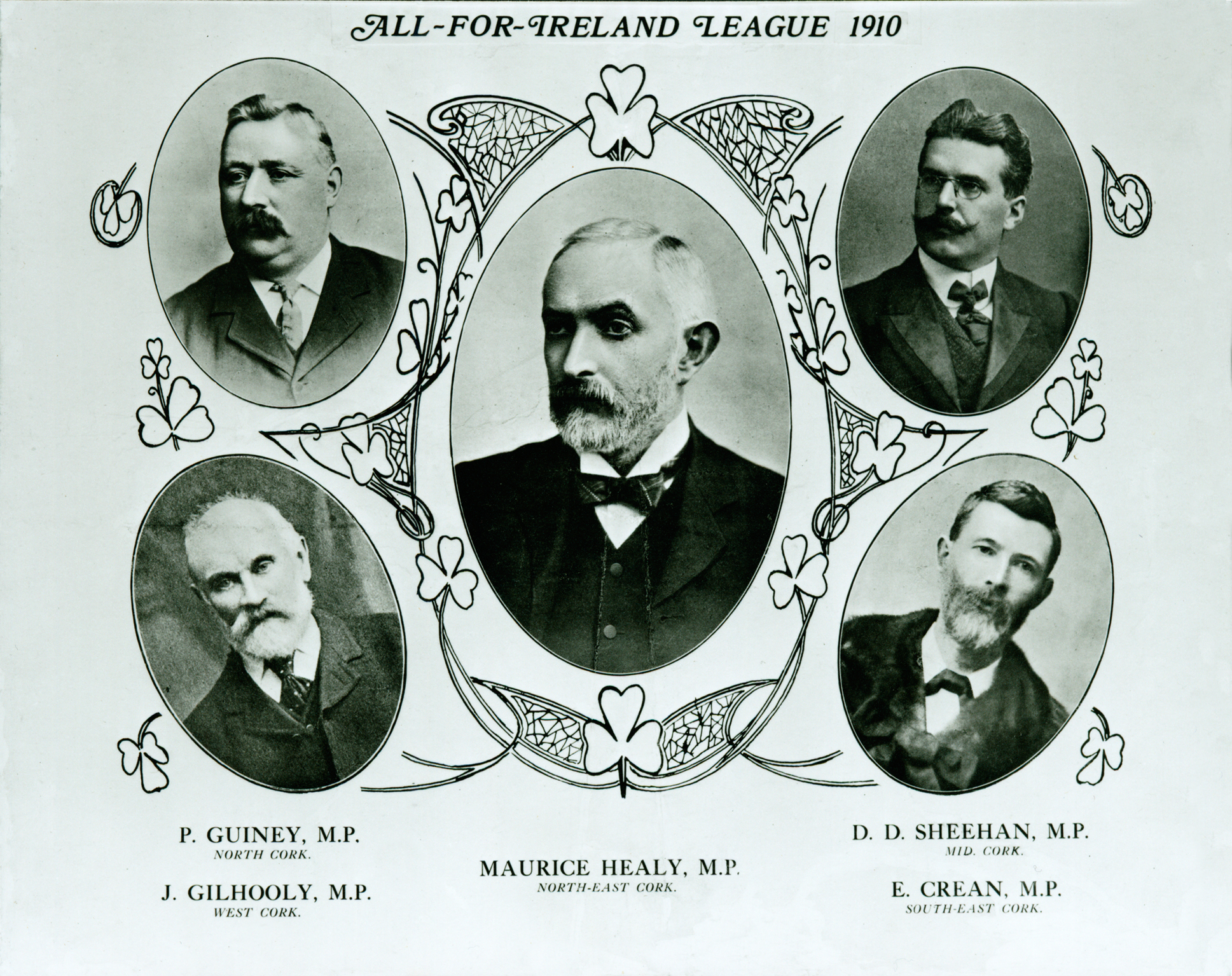
All-for-Ireland League group portrait of five of its Independent Members of Parliament, 1910. These are: Patrick Guiney (North Cork), James Gilhooly (West Cork), Maurice Healy (North East Cork), D. D. Sheehan (Mid Cork), and Eugene Crean (South East Cork). The other MPs elected in January 1910 were: William O'Brien (Cork city), John O'Donnell (South Mayo) and Timothy Michael Healy (North Louth).

In March 1909 he inaugurated the All-for-Ireland League (AFIL) in Kanturk with James Gilhooly MP as chairman and D. D. Sheehan honorary secretary. The AFIL's political objective was the attainment of an All-Ireland parliament with the consent rather than by the compulsion of the Protestant and Unionist community, under the banner of the "Three Cs", for Conference, Conciliation and Consent as applied to Irish politics. The League was supported by many prominent Protestant gentry, leading landlords and Munster business figures. The political activist Canon Sheehan of Doneraile was also a founder member and wrote in a very long editorial for the first issue of the League's new newspaper its political manifesto.

Ill-health striking O'Brien, he departed for Florence, Italy to recuperate, returning for the January 1910 general election, in which the Cork electorate returned eight "O'Brienite" MPs. Throughout 1910 his AFIL movement opposed an Irish Party supported by the Catholic clergy. It returned eight independent AFIL MPs in the December 1910 general election to be O'Brien's new political party. From July 1910 until late 1916 O'Brien published the League's newspaper, the Cork Free Press. Election results published by it showed Independents throughout Ireland had won 30% of votes cast.

O'Brien saw it opportune for a cooperative understanding with Arthur Griffith's moderate Sinn Féin movement, having in common – attaining objectives through "moral protest" – political resistance and agitation rather than militant physical-force. Neither O'Brien nor Griffith advocated total abstentionism from the Commons, and regarded Dominion Home Rule, modelled on Canada or Australia, as acceptable. Although Griffith favoured cooperation, a special Sinn Feín executive council meeting called to consider cooperation regretted it was not possible because its constitution would not allow it. In the following years O'Brien and his party continued to associate themselves with Griffith's movement both in and out of parliament. In June 1918 Griffith asked O'Brien to have the writ moved for his candidacy in the East Cavan by-election (moved by AFIL MP Eugene Crean) to which Griffith was elected with a sizeable majority.

== Home Rule stance ==
On 2 November 1911 O'Brien proposed full Dominion status similar to that enjoyed by Canada, in an exchange of views with Asquith, as the only viable solution to the "Irish Question". Home Rule became technically assured after a new Home Rule bill was introduced in 1912 with the IPP holding the balance of power at Westminster. During the 1913–14 Parliamentary debates on the Third Home Rule Bill, O'Brien, alarmed by Unionist resistance to the bill, opposed the IPP's coercive "Ulster must follow" policy, and published in the Cork Free Press end of January 1914 specific concession, including a suspensory veto right, which would enable Ulster join a Dublin Parliament "any price for an United Ireland, but never partition". William O'Brien resigned his seat as MP again for a fourth time in January and re-stood to test local support for his policies after the All-for-Ireland League suffered heavy defeats in the Cork City municipal elections.

After the opening of Parliament in February 1914 the threat of rebellion in Ulster gave O'Brien the opportunity to make an eloquent speech on 24 February calling for generous concessions towards Ulster, but warning he would 'strenuously oppose exclusion'. When the Ulster Volunteers armed in April to resist likely "Rome Rule", Redmond's Irish Volunteers armed likewise to ensure enactment of all-Ireland self-government. During the final stages of the second reading and debate on the Third Home Rule Bill in the House of Commons, which was accompanied by Asquith's guarantee that it would never be enforced without an Amending Bill enacting the exclusion of the six Ulster counties with a Protestant majority, O'Brien made a powerful lengthy speech on 1 April 1914 reiterating at length his proposals to enable Ulster to remain within an All-Ireland settlement, by means of a suspensory veto upon any bill passed by a Dublin Parliament, amongst other rights and protections. Stating "I condemn and abhor with all my heart the preparations of the Ulster Volunteers for even the possibility of slaughter between Irishmen and Irishmen". Otherwise, Ireland once divided would remain divided and 'the line on which you are presently travelling will never bring you anything except division and disaster'.

Opposing O'Brien's proposals and initiatives, the Redmond-Dillon-Devlin (IPP-UIL-AOH) hardline alliance remained uncompromising with their standpoint – "no concessions for Ulster". In the Commons on 25 May O'Brien stated that "we are ready for almost any conceivable concession to Ulster that will have the effect of uniting Ireland, but we will struggle to our last breath against a proposal which will divide her, and divide her eternally, if Ireland's own representatives are once consenting parties . . ." O'Brien and his followers held true to their pledge and abstained from the final vote passing the Government of Ireland Act 1914, denouncing the bill as a "ghastly farce" and ultimately as a "partition deal" after Sir Edward Carson, leader of the Ulster Unionist Party forced through an amendment mandating the partition of Ireland. The Irish Nationalists' confrontation course with Ulster had ended in a fiasco.

With the outbreak and involvement on 4 August 1914 of Ireland in World War I, Asquith proposed a Suspensory Bill for the Home Rule Bill. It received Royal Assent simultaneously with its counterpart, the Government of Ireland Act 1914, on 18 September. Although the two controversial Bills had now finally reached the statute books, the Suspensory Act ensured that Home Rule would be postponed for the duration of the conflict. In the debate on 15 September in the House of Commons concerning the Suspensory Bill, O'Brien made it again clear "that while we are prepared to pay almost any other price for a general national settlement, there is one price which some of us, at all events, will never in any possible circumstances consent to pay, and that is the dismemberment of our ancient Irish nation". He concluded by turning to 'our fellow countrymen in Ulster' in proposing to secure for them a position of undiminished citizenship in this Empire under some projected scheme of federalism.

== Last crusade ==
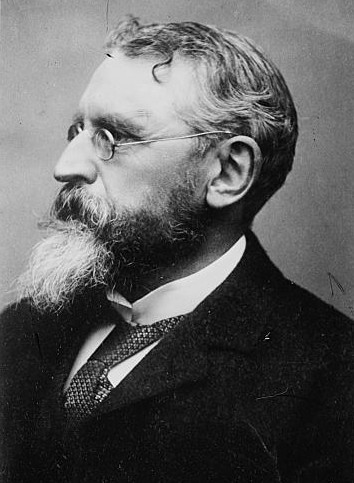
William O'Brien in 1917

O'Brien saw the outbreak of World War I in August as an opportunity to undertake a last crusade to preserve at any price the unity of Ireland, by uniting the Green and Orange in a common cause, declaring himself on the side of the Allied and Britain's European war effort. O'Brien was the first Nationalist leader to call on Irish Volunteers for the front. Towards the end of August, he had an interview with Lord Kitchener, Secretary of State for War, and laid before him a scheme for raising an Irish Army Corps embracing all classes and creeds, South and North. Kitchener (incidentally a Protestant and born in County Kerry) favoured the idea. O'Brien immediately summoned a meeting held in the Cork Town Hall under the auspices of the All-for-Ireland League on 2 September, the hall packed with an enthusiastic audience of men and women. In a speech that far exceeded Redmond's in favour of its adherence to England's cause, he said:

We are taking to-night – I don't conceal it from myself – one of the most momentous decisions in our history. If we make up our minds, for heaven's sake let there be no half-heartedness, let there be no qualifications or reservations. We have got to be honest friends or honest enemies of England. It won't do merely to say that we are willing to fight for Belgium, or to fight for Ireland, or to fight for France, much though we love those gallant nations (cheers). We have got to go further and to say, without putting a tooth in it, that we are ready to fight for England as well, in England's way (cheers). And in fighting England's battle in the particular circumstance of this war, I am convinced to the heart's core that we are fighting the most effective battle in all the ages for Ireland's liberty (cheers) as well as to save our towns and our homes and our women and children from the grip of the most appalling horde of brutes in human shape that ever cursed this earth since Atilla met his doom at the hands of eternal justice (cheers).

O'Brien later wrote: "Whether Home Rule is to have a future will depend upon the extent to which the Nationalists in combination with Ulster Covenanters, do their part in the firing line on the fields of France". He stood on recruiting platforms with the other National leaders and spoke out encouragingly in favour of voluntary enlistment in the Royal Munster Fusiliers and other Irish regiments.

== Changing tides ==
O'Brien, alarmed at the increased activity of Sinn Féin in 1915, predicted the danger of a potential republican eruption, culminating in the IRB 1916 Rebellion, in which however Sinn Féin were not involved. He was forced to cease publication of his Cork Free Press in 1916 soon after the appointment of Lord Decies as Chief Press Censor for Ireland. Decies warned the press to be careful about what they published. Such warnings had little effect when dealing with such papers as the Cork Free Press. It was suppressed after its republican editor, Frank Gallagher, accused the British authorities of lying about the conditions and situation of republican prisoners in the Frongoch internment camp.

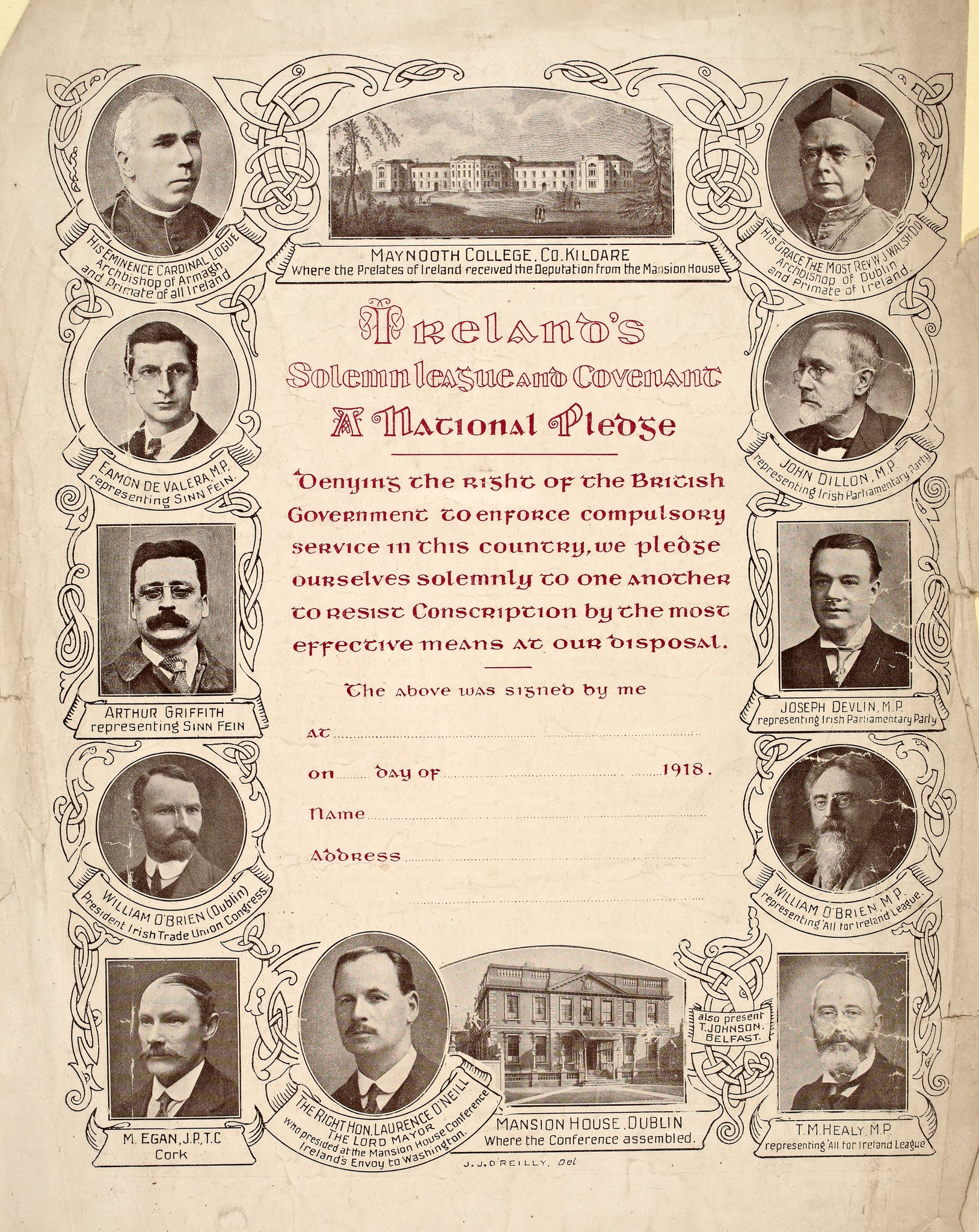
Ireland's Anti-Conscription Pledge, 1918

O'Brien accepted the Rising and the ensuing changed political climate in 1917 as the best way of ridding the country of IPP and AOH stagnation. Home Rule had been lost in 1913, an inflexible IPP long out of touch with reality, reflected by Britain's two failed attempts to introduce Home Rule in 1916 and again in 1917. O'Brien refused to participate in the Irish Convention after southern unionist representatives he had proposed were turned down. During the Convention Redmond belatedly adopted O'Brien's policy of accommodating Unionist opposition both from the North and from the South. But it was ten years too late. Had he joined O'Brien earlier and carried the Irish Party with him, it is probable that Ireland's destiny would have been settled by evolution. The Convention ended in failure as O'Brien predicted when Britain attempted to link the enactment of Home Rule with conscription.

During the anti-conscription crisis in April 1918 O'Brien and his AFIL left the House of Commons and joined Sinn Féin and other prominentaries in the mass protests in Dublin. Seeing no future for his conciliatory political concepts in a future election, he believed Sinn Féin in its moderate form had earned the right to represent nationalist interests. He and the other members of his All-for-Ireland League party stood aside putting their seats at the disposal of Sinn Féin, whose candidates returned unopposed in the December 1918 general elections. In an address to the election he had said:

We cannot subscribe to a programme of armed resistance in the field, or even of permanent withdrawal from Westminster; but to the spirit of Sinn Féin, as distinct from its abstract programme, the great mass of independent single-minded Irishmen have been won over, and accordingly they ought now to have a full and sympathetic trial for enforcing the Irish nation's right of self-determination.

O'Brien disagreed with the establishment of a southern Irish Free State under the Treaty, still believing that Partition of Ireland was too high a price to pay for partial independence. He wrote in 1923, "It is now obvious enough that, had the Irish Council Bill been allowed to pass in 1907, the Partition of Ireland would never have been heard of." Retiring from political life, he contented himself with writing and declined Éamon de Valera's offer to stand for Fianna Fáil in the 1927 general election. He died suddenly on 25 February 1928 while on a visit to London with his wife at the age of 75. His remains rest in Mallow, and one of the principal streets in the town bears his name to this day, as does Great William O'Brien Street in Cork. His head-bust overlooks the town Council's Chamber Room and a portrait of O'Brien hangs in University College Cork.

In 1920 Arthur Griffith said of O'Brien:

The task of William O'Brien's generation was well and bravely done, had it not been so the work we are carrying out in this generation would have been impossible. In that great work none of Parnell's lieutenants did so much as William O'Brien.

== Works ==
O'Brien's books, a number of which are collections of his journalistic writings and political speeches, include:

- Christmas on the Galtees (1878) Ballybeg Village Irish Christmas
- When we were boys (1890)
- Irish Ideas (1893) Irish Ideas (1893)
- A Queen of Men, Grace O'Malley (1898)
- Recollections (1905)
- An Olive Branch in Ireland, and Its History. London: Macmillan. 1910.
- The Irish Cause and "The Irish Convention" . Dublin: Maunsel & Company, Limited. 1917.
- The Downfall of Parliamentarianism (1918)
- Evening Memories (1920)
- The Responsibility for Partition (1921)
- The Irish Revolution and how it came about. London: Allen & Unwin. 1923.
- Edmund Burke as an Irishman (1924)

== Sources ==
- Bradley, Dan (1988). "Farm Labourer Organisations in co. Cork before 1919". Farm Labourers: Irish Struggle, 1900-1976. Athol Books. ISBN 978-0-85034-038-9.
- Costello, Peter (1999). Dublin Castle in the Life of the Irish Nation. Wolfhound Press. ISBN 978-0-86327-610-1.
- Ferriter, Diarmaid (2010). The Transformation Of Ireland 1900-2000. Profile Books. ISBN 978-1-84765-081-8.
- Jackson, Alvin (2003). Home Rule: An Irish History, 1800-2000. Oxford University Press. p. 103. ISBN 978-0-19-522048-3.
- King, Carla (2009). Michael Davitt. Dublin: University College Dublin Press. ISBN 9781910820964.
- Lyons, F.S.L. (1968). John Dillon : a biography. London: Routledge & K. Paul. OCLC 644163112.
- MacDonagh, Michael (1928). The Life of William O'Brien, the Irish Nationalist: A Biographical Study of Irish Nationalism, Constitutional and Revolutionary. London: Ernst Benn. ISBN 9780598548351.
- Martin, Peter (2006). Censorship in the Two Irelands, 1922-39. Irish Academic Press. ISBN 978-0-7165-2829-6.
- Maume, Patrick (1999). The long gestation: Irish nationalist life 1891-1918. Gill & Macmillan. ISBN 9780717127443.
- McKay, Enda (1992). "The Housing Of The Rural Labourer, 1883-1916". Saothar. 17. Irish Labour History Society: 27–38. JSTOR 23197339.
- Miller, David W. (1973). "Land for the People". Church, State, and Nation in Ireland, 1898-1921. University of Pittsburgh Press. ISBN 978-0-8229-1108-1.
- O'Brien, Joseph V. (1976). William O'Brien and the Course of Irish Politics, 1881-1918. University of California Press. ISBN 978-0-520-02886-9.
- O'Donovan, John (2013). "Daniel Desmond (D. D.) Sheehan and the Rural Labour Question in Cork (1894–1910)". In Casey, Brian (ed.). Defying the Law of the Land: Agrarian Radicals in Irish History. History Press Limited. ISBN 978-1-84588-801-5.
- O'Donovan, John (2014). "The All-for-Ireland League and the Home Rule debate, 1910–14". In Doherty, Gabriel (ed.). The Home Rule Crisis 1912-14. Cork: Mercier Press. ISBN 978-1-78117-245-2.
- Potter, Matthew (2011). The Municipal Revolution in Ireland: A Handbook of Urban Government in Ireland Since 1800. Irish Academic Press. ISBN 978-0-7165-3082-4.
- Sheehan, D. D. (1921). Ireland Since Parnell. London: D. O'Connor.

Parliament of the United Kingdom
Preceded by William Moore Johnson	Member of Parliament for Mallow; 1883–1885	Constituency abolished
New constituency	Member of Parliament for Tyrone South; 1885–1886	Succeeded by Thomas Russell
Preceded by Edmund Leamy	Member of Parliament for North East Cork; 1887–1892	Succeeded by Michael Davitt
Preceded by Martin Flavin	Member of Parliament for Cork City; 1892–1895	Succeeded by J. F. X. O'Brien
Preceded by Maurice Healy	Member of Parliament for Cork City; 1900–1904	Vacant
Vacant	Member of Parliament for Cork City; 1904–1909	Succeeded by Maurice Healy
Preceded by William Abraham	Member of Parliament for North East Cork; 1910	Succeeded by Maurice Healy
Preceded by Maurice Healy	Member of Parliament for Cork City; 1910–1918	Succeeded by Liam de Róiste; J. J. Walsh
