= Richard van der Borght =

German economist and statistician (1861–1926)

Richard van der Borght (1861–1926) was a German academic economist and statistician.

== Life ==
Van der Borght was born in Potsdam on 18 January 1861. After studying first Theology and then Politics in Halle, Van der Borght in 1884 became syndic of the Chamber of Commerce in Aachen. From 1892 to 1900 he held the Chair of National Economics at the Technischen Hochschule Aachen. For two years (1898–1900) he was a member of the Prussian House of Representatives. In 1901 he became a privy councillor, and from 1904 to 1912 served as Chairman of the Kaiserliches Statistisches Amt (Imperial Office of Statistics) in Berlin. He died in Berlin on 18 April 1926.

== Works ==
- Die wirtschaftliche Bedeutung der Rhein-Seeschiffahrt (Cologne, 1892) Available from the University of Cologne
- Handel und Handelspolitik (Leipzig, 1900). Available on Internet Archive
- "A History of Banking in All the Leading Nations; comprising the United States; Great Britain; Germany; Austro-Hungary; France; Italy; Belgium; Spain; Switzerland; Portugal; Roumania; Russia; Holland; the Scandinavian nations; Canada; China; Japan; by Sumner, William Graham, 1840-1910; Macleod, Henry Dunning, 1821-1902; Horn, Antoine E; Townsend, John Pomeroy, 1832-1898; Des Essars, Pierre; Raffalovich, Arthur, 1853-1921; Walker, Byron Edmund, Sir, 1848-1924; Wirth, Max, 1822-1900; Borght, R. van der (Richard), 1861-1926; Jensen, Adolph Ludwig Otto, 1866-; Soyeda, Juichi; Jernigan, Thomas R." (Internet Archive)

== Sources ==
- Kürschners Deutscher Gelehrten-Kalender, 1926, p. 168f.
- Friedrich-Wilhelm Henning, "Richard van der Borght (1861–1926)" in Wolfhard Weber (ed.), Rheinische und Westfälische Handelskammersekretäre und -syndici vom 18. bis zum Anfang des 20. Jahrhunderts. (Rheinisch-Westfälische Wirtschaftsbiographien 15; 1994), pp. 23–42.
- Friedrich Zahn, "van der Borght, Richard. 1861–1926", Bulletin de l’Institut International de Statistique 23.1 (1928), pp. 327–330. (Gallica)
