= Sophie Raffalovich =

Odessa-born Irish author and nationalist

Sophie Raffalovich O'Brien
- Sophie Raffalovich
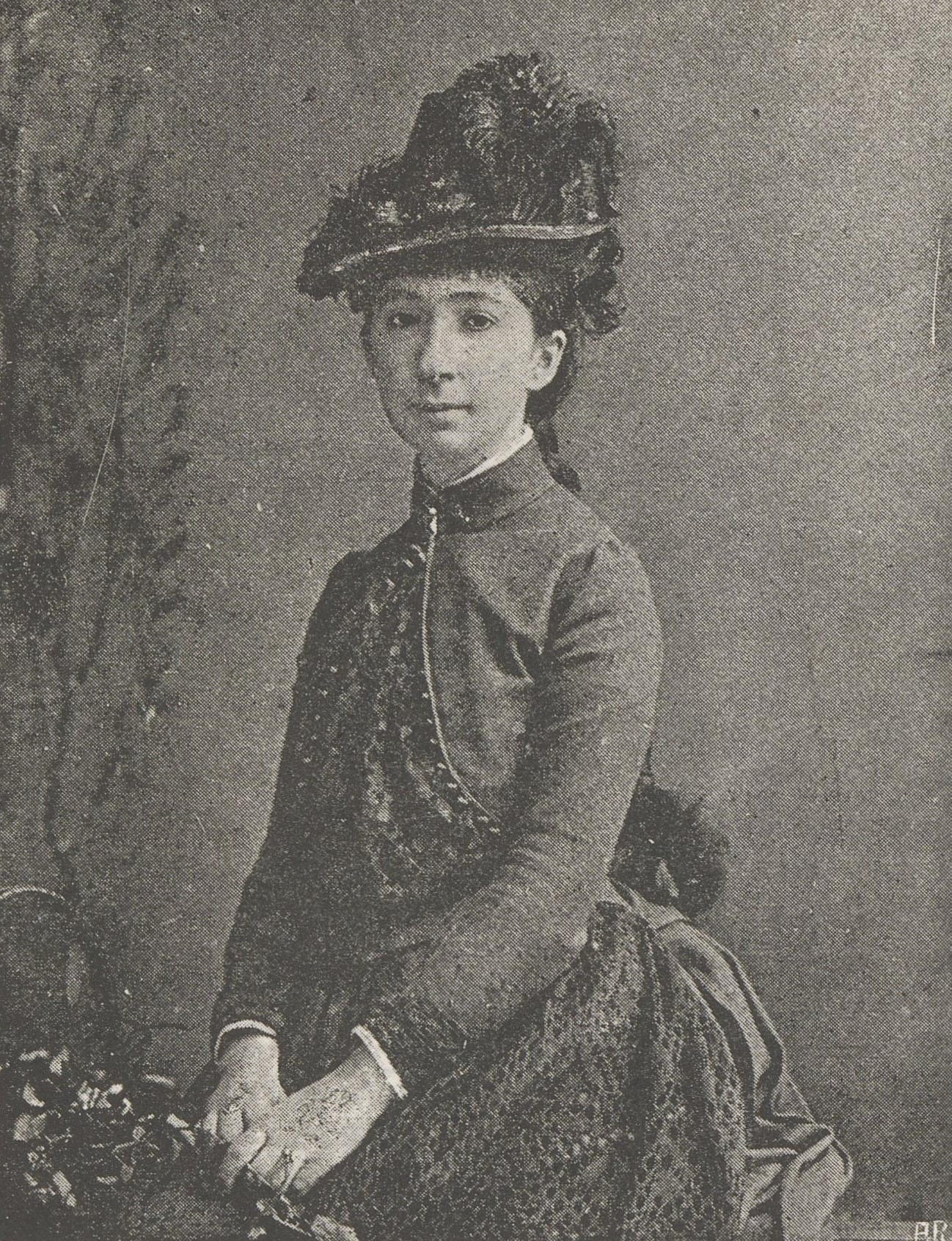
- Born: 15 January 1860; Odessa
- Died: 8 January 1960 (aged 99); Neuilly

Sophie Raffalovich O'Brien (1860–1960), was a writer and Irish nationalist.

== Early life and education ==
Born Sophie Raffalovich on 15 January 1860 in Odessa to Herman and Marie Raffalovich. Her father was a banker, with two sons, Marc-André and Arthur. The family was Jewish and moved in 1864 to France due to pressure to convert religion. Her father would have to travel back to Odessa for business and spent half of each year there. Marie was a political republican interested in the arts and sciences and held popular salons in France. She was close friends with physiologist Claude Bernard. Raffalovich grew up aware of her advantages and studied political economy. She translated works on the lives of Cobden and Lord Shaftesbury. Her brother André's held literary salons in London where she would act as hostess.

== Irish question ==
Stories and details about William O'Brien's highly publicised arrests during the Plan of Campaign led both the mother and daughter to become interested in Ireland and the political situation there. Raffalovich began to write to O'Brien and eventually met him in 1889. After a brief courtship they were engaged. Raffalovich converted to Catholicism. This was a disappointment to her father but her own writings show that she did not do this purely for the marriage. Her brothers both followed her to this end. While she gave up her childhood religion, Raffalovich did not give up her Jewish identity.

She married O'Brien on 11 June 1890 and the wedding was attended by Charles Stewart Parnell, a major gathering of the Irish party before they split later in the year. Raffalovich moved to Ireland with her husband after the wedding and was accepted quickly into the social groups. She was particularly close with Anne Deane and Henrietta Mitchel Martin. Her husband relied heavily on Raffalovich as a funding source, secretary and nurse during the periods of his career where his health was poor. She was the financial accountant and they lived as simply as possible so they could give as much to the poor as possible.

In 1895 O'Brien refused to pay off debts incurred during the 'Plan of Campaign', choosing instead to go bankrupt. The couple retired to a cottage in Westport, County Mayo where they worked together on farming, dog breeding and writing. They supported local fisheries financially where possible. Raffalovich wrote a couple of novels which describe the time.

While based in Westport Raffalovich, with local nuns, founded various craft industries and ensured the availability of markets in Paris for the lace locally produced. She worked with Sister Mary Eustace Eaton of the Harold's Cross Hospice for the Dying and wrote a biography of her life in 1923. Having had no children and with her husband unwilling to adopt, Raffalovich chose to support girls who still lived with their families but lacked other advantages.

The results of the Irish Famines were still visible among the people in Connacht while the couple were living there and they were actively involved in local relief work in 1897–1898. O'Brien was clear that land redistribution was the means for ameliorating the situation and Raffalovich became the primary backer of the United Irish League. It was this that lead to the initial reunion of the Irish Parliamentary Party in 1900, though O'Brien left once more only 3 years later. Raffalovich continued to fund his political activities despite the heavy financial expense when he founded the daily newspaper, the Cork Free Press.

When they moved to Bellevue House, Mallow, County Cork in 1912 Raffalovich took on local charity work again and wrote extensively on both religious and political topics for the newspapers including a women's column on women's education and women's involvement in local government for the Cork Free Press. Despite her work on women's rights, Raffalovich was not a suffragist. She did not believe in a woman's right to vote. Although her husband was in favour of it and she appeared with him when he spoke, she never supported it and refused to allow her name to be added to the electoral register when women won the right to vote.

Raffalovich's mother continued to live in France and Raffalovich felt very connected to the country where she had grown up. The couple supported the allied cause and Raffalovich had no pity for Sinn Féin when they seemed to endanger the allied war effort. Her husband was less unforgiving and they had to disagree on the topic. The war eliminated what wealth Raffalovich had through the loss of the family investments in Russia and Germany. Her finances had supported her husband's political career and that career also ended with the 1918 election.

== After politics ==
For about ten years the couple lived in retirement until O'Brien died in 1928. Raffalovich felt it was her duty to ensure his memory was intact and she spent some years working through the papers and documents he left behind. She worked with his biographer, Michael MacDonagh and published some of his work. She donated his papers to both University College Cork and the National Library of Ireland.

She was awarded a Doctor of Letters in February 1938 from the National University of Ireland for this work.

In earlier years Raffalovich had considered that she would join her friend's convent if her husband died but in 1933 she realised she was too old for such a change and that her home in Cork was too large for her alone, she moved back to France near Amiens, to live with sisters Fernande and Lucie Guilmart who had been pupils of the Amiens orphanage and school she had supported since the 1880s. She and the sisters had become friends when they visited her in Ireland in the early 1930s. They took care of her afterwards. Raffalovich called them ‘the best daughters a childless old woman could have’.

Raffalovich was still living in France when it was invaded by Germany during the Second World War. The sisters ensured her escape with them to the region near the Pyrenees. Éamon de Valera prevented a public collection of funds to help the three women who had been reduced to near destitution by events. He claimed the government would provide for her but sent a single amount of £150 through the Irish consulate to Vichy. Paul O'Dwyer ensured a collection of money through the New York Irish. However she was extremely impoverished by the end of the war though she continued to live with the Guilmart sisters this time at Neuilly-St Front, near Soissons. Lucie died in 1957; Fernande outlived her. She died at Neuilly on 8 January 1960.

== Bibliography ==
- John Bright et Henry Fawcett (writing as Sophie Raffalovich), Paris, (1886)
- Under Croagh Patrick (1904)
- Rosette: a romance of Paris and Dublin (1907)
- Her Unseen friends (1912)
- In Mallow (1920)
- Sister Mary Eustace (1923)
- Silhouettes d’Autrefois (1926)
- Golden Memories (1929)
- Around Broom Lane (1931)
- My Irish friends (1937)
