= Marc-André Raffalovich =

French poet (1864–1934)

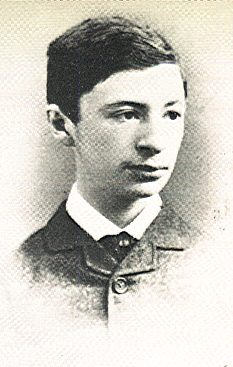
Marc-André Raffalovich circa 1880

Marc-André Raffalovich (11 September 1864 – 14 February 1934) was a French poet and writer on homosexuality, best known today for his patronage of the arts and for his lifelong relationship with the English poet John Gray, and for his conversion to Catholicism.

== Early life ==
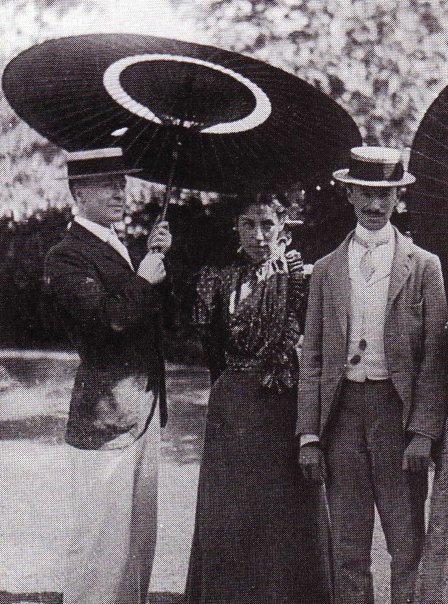
John Gray and Marc-André Raffalovich with a friend

Raffalovich was born into a wealthy Jewish family, which moved from Odessa to the French capital, Paris, in 1863. His brother, Arthur, became a noted Parisian financier and economist. André went up to study in Oxford in 1882 before settling down in London and opening a salon in the 1890s. Oscar Wilde attended, calling the event a saloon rather than a salon. This is where Raffalovich met the love and companion of his life, John Gray. In 1890, his sister Sophie married the Irish nationalist politician William O'Brien (1852–1928).

== Writings ==
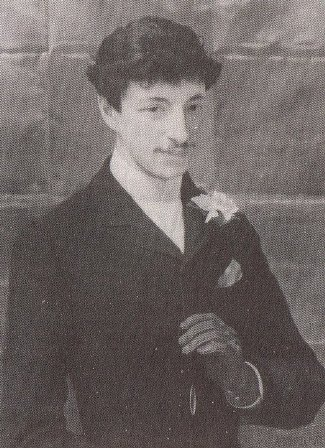
Marc-André Raffalovich

In 1894, Raffalovich started to contribute on the subject of homosexuality (unisexualité, as he called it) to the Archives de l'Anthropologie Criminelle, a prestigious review founded in Lyon by Alexandre Lacassagne, a pioneer criminologist and professor of forensic medicine. He soon became recognised as an expert in the field, engaging in correspondence with other researchers throughout Europe.

His magnum opus, Uranisme et unisexualité: étude sur différentes manifestations de l'instinct sexuel was published in 1896. In 1897, he started working on Annales de l'unisexualité, and les Chroniques de l'unisexualité with the aim of cataloguing everything published on the subject of homosexuality. These have proved useful to historians to this day.

From 1927 to 1929 Raffalovich contributed articles to the Dominican journal Blackfriars under the pseudonym Alexander Michaelson, recalling writers and artists he had known. He commented, too, on modern writers, among them E. B. C. Jones, whom he considered typical of "our clever (in the worst sense of the word) – too clever – women novelists, so sensitive to the charms of nature and of art, of human relationships and of animal favourites, so obtuse, so stupid in the vicinity of sin." He mocked the "immoral theories" implied by one of her novel's endings: "Remove chastity from the virtues, exalt conceit, and then write Helen and Felicia." (Jones was Robbie Ross's niece.)

== Conversion ==
In 1896, under the influence of John Gray, Raffalovich embraced Catholicism and joined the tertiary order of the Dominicans as Brother Sebastian in honour of Saint Sebastian. At the same time Gray was ordained a priest. In 1905, Gray was appointed to the parish of St Patrick in the working class Cowgate area of Edinburgh. Raffalovich followed and settled down nearby, purchasing No. 9, Whitehouse Terrace. He contributed greatly to the cost of St Peter's Church in Morningside, Edinburgh, of which Gray was appointed the first parish priest. In Whitehouse Terrace, Raffalovich established a successful salon. His guests included Henry James, Lady Margaret Sackville, Compton Mackenzie, Max Beerbohm and Herbert Read.

== Theories ==
There is a close link between Raffalovich's views on homosexuality and his Catholic beliefs. In contrast to then-current theories of sexual inversion, according to which a man was a homosexual because he had a female soul in a male body and a woman was lesbian because she had a male soul in a female body, and which thus essentially reproduced heterosexuality, Raffalovich's view of "unisexuality" held that it consisted of attraction to the same sex, closer to the modern conception of homosexuality. He wrote of gay men, "As men, they love men; but they affirm that were they women they would love women." He made the distinction between the born and the chosen inverts. He believed the former worth considering while the latter he thought to be mired in vice and perversion.

Raffalovich drew, however, a difference with heterosexuality based on the idea of vice and virtue. He regarded a heterosexual's destiny as marriage and starting a family, whereas a homosexual's duty, he believed, was to overcome and transcend his desires with artistic pursuits and spiritual – even mystical – friendships.

These views led him to clash with Magnus Hirschfeld and the members of the Scientific Humanitarian Committee, with Raffalovich accusing them of being propagandists for moral dissolution and of wanting to destroy whole generations. He even supported Germany's Paragraph 175 as a way to prevent total moral chaos.

Raffalovich's failure to reconcile his homosexuality and the Roman Catholic religion he accepted as true pushed him further into his criticism of the early gay liberation movement; in 1910, he finally stopped commenting altogether on the subject which had occupied such a place in his life. Instead, he focused on his Edinburgh salon and his support of young artists.

He died in 1934, the same year as his now platonic friend, John Gray.

== Bibliography ==
Note: Most of Raffalovich's non-fiction writings are available online from the "Archives d'anthropologie criminelle" (AAC) as *.jpg files.

- 1884 Cyril and Lionel, and other poems. A volume of sentimental studies, Kegan Paul & Co., London 1884, 102 pp.
- 1885 Tuberose and meadow-sweet [poems]. D. Boque, London 1885, pp. 120.
- 1886 In fancy dress [poems], Walter Scott, London 1886, pp. 148.
- 1889 It is thyself [poems], Walter Scott, London 1889, pp. 146.
- 1890 A willing exile. A novel, F. V. White & Co., London 1890, 2 voll.
- 1894 Quelques observations sur l'inversion, "AAC", n. 50, IX 1894, pp. 216–218.
- 1894 L'éducation des invertis, "AAC", n. 54, IX 1894, pp. 738–740.
- 1895 The thread and the path [poems], David Nutt, London 1895, pp. 106.
- 1895 L'uranisme. Inversion sexuelle congenitale. Observations at conseils, "AAC", X 1895, pp. 99–127.
- 1895 Uranism, congenital sexual inversion. Journal of Comparative Neurology, 5(1) pp 33–65, https://doi.org/10.1002/cne.910050103
- 1895 John Addington Symonds, "AAC", X 1895, pp. 241–244.
- 1895 L'inversion sexuelle, "AAC", X 1895, pp. 325–332.
- 1895 A propos du Roman d'un inverti et de quelques travaux récents sur l'inversion sexuelle, "AAC", X 1895, pp. 333–336.
- 1895 L'affaire Oscar Wilde, "AAC", X 1895, pp. 445–477.
- 1895 Homosexualité et hétérosexualité, trois confessions, "AAC", X 1895, pp. 748–758.
- 1896 Unisexualité anglaise, "AAC", XI 1896, pp. 429–431.
- 1896 Uranisme et unisexualité: étude sur differentes manifestations de l'instinct sexuel, Storck, Lyon & Masson, Paris 1896, 363 pp.
- 1897 Annales de l'unisexualité, "AAC", XII 1897, pp. 87–102 e 185–224. (.pdf).
- 1903 L'affaire du prince de Bragance, "AAC", XVIII 1903, pp. 159–161.
- 1903 A propos de l'affaire Shakespeare-Bacon, "AAC", XVIII 1903, pp. 662–665.
- 1904 Les groupes uranistes à Paris et à Berlin, "AAC", n. 132, XIX 1904, pp. 926–936.
- 1905 A propos du syndacat des uranistes, "AAC", XX nn. 136/137, pp. 283–286.
- 1906 Sur Richard Burton, "AAC", XXI 1906, pp. 474–479.
- 1907 Chroniques de l'unisexualité, "AAC", XXII 1907, pp. 606–632 e 767–786. (.pdf).
- 1907 Des mariages entre hommes, "AAC", XXII 1907, pp. 267–268.
- 1909 Chronique de l'unisexualité, "AAC", XXIV 1909, pp. 353–391.
- 1910 L'amour homosexuel, & The origine [sic] and development of the moral ideas, par E. Westermarck (chap. XLIII), "AAC", XXV 1910, pp. 291–295 e 295–305.

== Sources ==
- Marc-André Raffalovich
- Cardon, Patrick, A homosexual militant at the beginning of the century: Marc Andre Raffalovich, "Journal of Homosexuality", XXV 1993 (1–2), pp. 183–191.
- Cardon, Patrick, Discours littéraire et scientifiques fin de siècle : Les Archives d'Anthropologie Criminelle du Dr Lacassagne de Lyon, 1886–1914, Université de Provence, 1984.
- Cardon, Patrick, Discours littéraire et scientifique fin-de-siècle. La discussion sur les homosexualités dans la revue du Dr Lacassagne, Les Archives d’anthropologie criminelle (1886–1914) – autour de Marc-André Raffalovich –, Paris: Orizons, 2008, collection « homosexualités »
- Cardon, Patrick, Un pionnier de l'homoliberté. Avec Marc-André Raffalovitch, l'homosexualité cessait d'être une inversion monstrueuse de l'hétérosexualité. Numéro 389 du 12 octobre 1989 du journal Gai Pied Hebdo (France)
- McCormack, Jerusha Hull, "John Gray: Poet, Dandy, & Priest", University Press of New England, Hanover, N.H., 1991.
- McCormack, Jerusha Hull, The Man Who was Dorian Gray, St. Martin's Press, New York, 2000.
- Rosario, Vernon, L'Irrésistible ascension du pervers, EPEL "les grands classiques de l'érotologie moderne", 2000 (chapitre 3).
- Sewell, père Brocard (dir.), Two friends: John Gray and André Raffalovich: essays. Biographical and critical, Saint Albert's Press, Aylesford (Kent) 1963.
- Sewell, père Brocard, Footnote to the Nineties: a memoir of John Gray and André Raffalovich, Cecil and Emilia Woolf, London 1968. ISBN 0-900821-01-9.
- Aldrich R. & Wotherspoon G., Who's Who in Gay and Lesbian History, from Antiquity to WWII, Routledge, London, 2001
