= Michael MacDonagh (author) =

Irish author and journalist

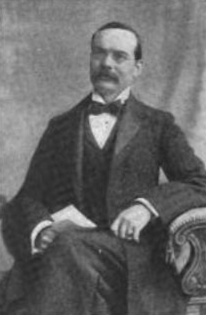
- In The Sketch, 28 December 1898
- Born: 26 August 1860; Limerick, Ireland
- Died: 27 February 1946 (aged 85); London, England
- Occupations: Journalist, writer
- Spouse: Mary Josephine (m. 1888; died 1924)
- Children: 1

Michael MacDonagh (26 August 1860 – 27 February 1946) was an Irish author and journalist. From 1894 until 1933 he wrote for The Times as a member of their parliamentary and reporting staff.

== Early life and career ==
He was born in Limerick and educated at the Christian Brothers' School. He began writing for the Freeman's Journal when he was 21, and was their special correspondent for eight years. In 1887 he was appointed as sketch writer in the House of Commons.

He joined The Times in 1894 and reported on major events such as Queen Victoria's Diamond Jubilee and the Boer War. He also wrote campaign articles for the paper during general elections.

As well as his work for The Times, MacDonagh contributed articles to magazines on his favourite subjects of Irish history and literature, and parliamentary procedures and traditions. He authored biographies of James Warren Doyle, Daniel O'Connell and William O'Brien, and was a supporter of the Irish Home Rule movement. Before the First World War the leader of the Irish Nationalist Party, John Redmond, had promised MacDonagh the office of Clerk of the Irish House of Commons but subsequent events prevented his appointment. His ideal was a united Ireland, loyal to the crown and inside the Commonwealth, and he opposed the partition of Ireland between north and south.

MacDonagh was one of the first members of the Institute of Journalists and he was a founder of the Irish Literary Society, for which he later served as vice-president. In 1924 he was elected chairman of the Press Gallery. He also wrote entries for the Dictionary of National Biography.

== Personal life ==
In 1888 he married Mary Josephine (d. 1924) and they had one son. The Times said MacDonagh was a "staunch Roman Catholic, and one of the most tolerant of men".

MacDonagh died at his home in London on 27 February 1946.

== Works ==
- Irish Graves in England: A Series of Articles (Dublin: Evening Telegraph Office, 1888).
- Bishop Doyle "J.K.L.": A Biographical and Historical Study (London: T. Fisher Unwin, 1896).
- The Book of Parliament (London: Isbister, 1897, 1917).
- Irish Life and Character (London: Hodder & Stoughton, 1898).
- Parliament—Its Romance, Its Comedy, Its Pathos (Westminster: P.S. King & Son, 1902).
- The Life of Daniel O'Connell (London: Cassel & Co, 1903).
- The Viceroy's Post-bag; Correspondence, Hitherto Unpublished, of The Earl of Hardwicke, First Lord Lieutenant of Ireland, After the Union (London: John Murray, 1904).
- The Reporters' Gallery (London: Hodder and Stoughton, 1913).
- The Speaker of the House of Commons (London: Methuen, 1914).
- The Irish at the Front (London: Hodder and Stoughton, 1916).
- The Irish on the Somme; Being the Second Series of "The Irish at the Front" (London: Hodder and Stoughton, 1917).
- The Home Rule Movement (Dublin: Talbot Press; London: T. F. Unwin, 1920).
- The Pageant of Parliament Vol.1 (London: T. F. Unwin, 1921).
- The Life of William O'Brien, the Irish Nationalist: A Biographical Study of Irish Nationalism, Constitutional and Revolutionary (London: Ernest Benn, 1928).
- Daniel O'Connell and the Story of Catholic Emancipation (London: Burns, Oates & Washbourne Ltd, 1929).
- The English King: A Study of the Monarchy and the Royal Family, Historical, Constitutional and Social (London: Ernest Benn, 1929).
- In London during the Great War (London: Eyre and Spottiswoode, 1935).
