= Arthur Raffalovich =

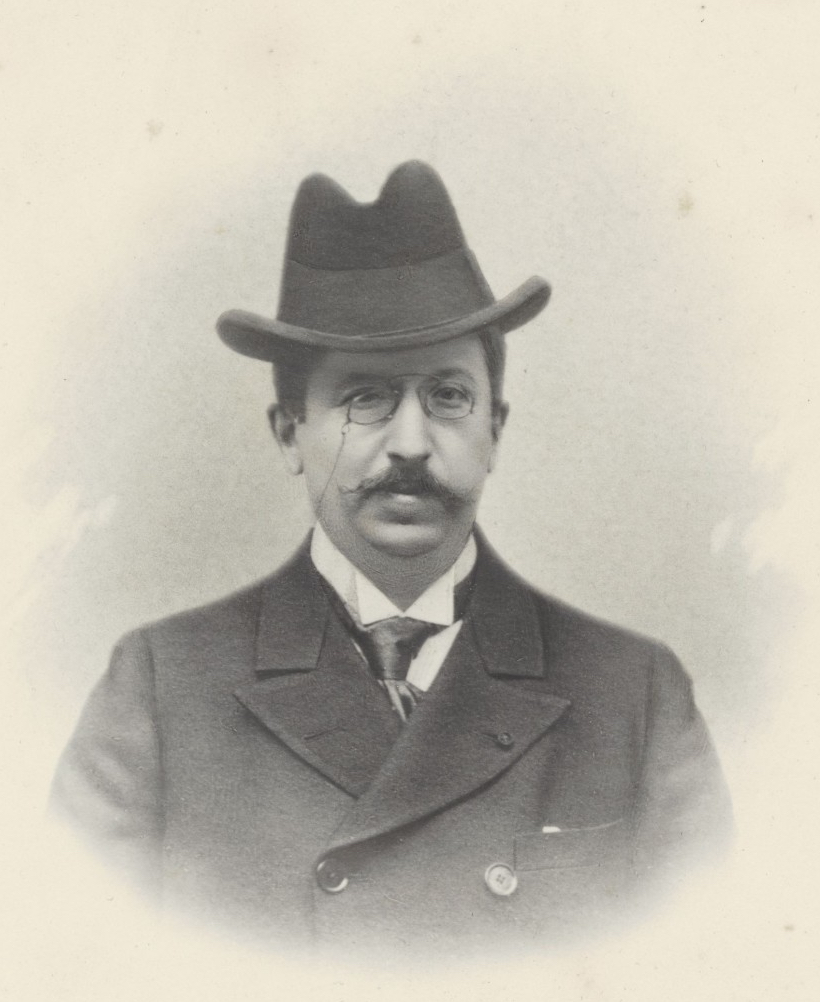
Arthur Raffalovich

Arthur Germanovich Raffalovich (born Odessa, 1853; died Paris, 1921) was a Russian financier and economist.

== Life ==
Raffalovich was born in Odessa in 1853, the son of a wealthy Jewish merchant, Hermann Raffalovich, but the family moved to Paris when he was a child. Arthur lived most of his life in Paris, where he died on 24 December 1921. His brother, Marc-André Raffalovich, was a poet and a writer on homosexuality, and his sister, Sophie, married and supported the Irish M.P. William O'Brien.

He was at various times private secretary to Count Shuvalov, financial editor of the Journal des Débats, chairman of the Russian Chamber of Commerce in Paris, Commercial Attaché to the Russian Imperial Embassy in Paris, and the Russian state's financial agent in London. Under Sergei Witte, he was a councillor of the State Council of Imperial Russia.

Raffalovich was a corresponding member of the Institut de France.

== Bibliography ==
Besides reviews in the Journal des Économistes and an annual overview of financial markets under the title Le marché financier (1893–1920), Raffalovich wrote or contributed to the following books and reports.

- Le logement de l'ouvrier et du pauvre. 1887.
- Les Finances de la Russie, 1887-1889. 1889.
- A History of Banking in all the Leading Nations. 1896.
- Mémoire sur la Conférence de La Haye. 1899.
- Les crises commerciales et financières depuis 1889. 1900.
- The State Monopoly of Spirits in Russia and its Influence on the Prosperity of the Population. 1901.
- Trusts, Cartels et Syndicats. Paris 1903, 2e. Ed.
- Le Système de banque en Angleterre. 1911.
- Russia: Its Trade and Commerce. 1918.
- La Détresse de la Russie: Ce que les Bolcheviks ont fait des finances publiques. 1919.
- Le Problème financier russe: La dette publique de la Russie. 1922.
