= William Dodsworth (editor) =

William Dodsworth (1827–1910) was a financial journalist and expert, and from 1893 to 1910 president and editor of the Journal of Commerce and Commercial Bulletin.

== Life ==
Dodsworth was born in England in 1827 and immigrated to the United States as a young man. Together with Newton F. Whiting he bought the Daily Commercial Bulletin in 1870, buying out his partner in 1881. He modernized the plant with linotype machines and in 1893 acquired the Journal of Commerce, consolidating the two papers under a joint title.

As a recognised financial expert he was influential both on policy in Washington and on investment decisions on Wall Street.

He died at his home in Englewood, New Jersey, on February 8, 1910.

== Works ==
- Social Inequalities and Modern Socialism (New York, 1894)
- Cheap Money. A Talk between Sam Silver, Frank Fiat and Ben Banks (n.p., 1895)
- The Treasury Question: Its Origin and Solution (New York, 1896)
- (editor), A History of Banking in all the Leading Nations (4 vols., New York, 1896; reprinted 1971)
- Our Legal Tender System: Its Evils and Their Remedy (New York, 1897)
