= Lancaster Blackfriars =

Friary in Lancashire, England

Coordinates: 54.04827°N 2.79737°W

Lancaster Friary was a friary in Lancashire, England. The buildings were approximately where Dalton Square is found today. It was active between 1260 and 1539 . Nothing remains. Two archaeological trenches were dug in 1981 and 1994; they exposed some tiles and wall footings.
