= Blackfriars, Montrose =

Mendicant Friary Of the Dominican Order

Church of the Blessed Virgin Mary, Montrose
Monastery information
- Order: Dominican
- Established: 13th century (1st); 1518 (2nd)
- Disestablished: 1571
- Diocese: Diocese of Brechin

People
- Founder(s): Alan Durward (1st); James V, John Stewart, Duke of Albany, Patrick Panter (2nd)

The Church of the Friars Preachers of the Blessed Virgin Mary, Montrose, commonly called Blackfriars, was a mendicant friary of the Dominican Order founded in the 13th century at Montrose, Scotland. The Chronica Extracta claimed that it was founded by Alan Durward. It was however abandoned at some point in the 14th century. In the early 16th century it was alleged that the house had fallen into disuse because it had been burned during a war, perhaps the Wars of Scottish Independence, and neglected thereafter.

On 14 November 1516, John Stewart, Duke of Albany, acting in the name of King James V of Scotland, authorised Patrick Panter, Abbot of Cambuskenneth, to re-institute the house. On 18 May 1517, Pope Leo X granted Albany's petition to transfer the property of St Mary's Hospital to the friary. The papal bull of erection was issued on 5 June 1518. The house had a prior, a sub-prior, and at least eight ordinary friars. The friars appear to have resided at the hospital as much if not more than they did at their former house.

The black friars of Montrose, like mendicants everywhere else in Scotland, were targeted during the lead up to the Scottish Reformation. A letter by Francis II of France and Mary, Queen of Scots, dated 22 February 1559, confirmed the decision of the lords of the secret council to eject the friars and restore the hospital. King James VI of Scotland granted the property and remaining revenues of the friars to the burgh of Montrose on 1 January 1571.
