= Bulletin of the International Statistical Institute =

- Discipline: Statistics
- Language: English

Publication details
- Frequency: Biennial

Standard abbreviations
- ISO 4: Bull. Int. Stat. Inst.

Indexing
- ISSN: 0373-0441
- OCLC no.: 405746725

Bulletin of the International Statistical Institute (Bulletin de l'Institut international de statistique) was a journal that published the proceedings of the biennial International Statistical Institute World Statistics Congresses. It first appeared in 1886. It last appeared in 2012, being subsumed by webpage listings of all abstracts and some papers presented.
