= Freke =

Freke is a surname, and may refer to:

- John Freke (disambiguation)
- Nathan Freke (born 1983), British Formula Ford champion
- Sir Percy Freke, 2nd Baronet (1700–1728), Irish politician
- Percy Freke (politician, died 1707), Irish politician
- Percy Evans Freke (1844–1931), Irish ornithologist and entomologist
- Timothy Freke (born 1959), British author of books on religion and mysticism
- Freke baronets, descended from Percy Freke

== See also ==
- Geri and Freki
