= George Evans =

George Evans may refer to:

== Arts and entertainment ==
- George "Honey Boy" Evans (1870–1915), American songwriter and entertainer
- George Evans (bandleader) (1915–1993), English jazz bandleader, arranger and tenor saxophonist
- George Evans (singer) (born 1963), Canadian-American jazz vocalist
- George Evans, pseudonym of Frederick Schiller Faust (1892–1944), American author known as Max Brand
- George Bird Evans (1906–1998), American author, artist and dog breeder
- George Ewart Evans (1909–1988), Welsh-born schoolteacher, writer and folklorist
- George Evans (cartoonist) (1920–2001), American comic book artist

== Politics ==
- George Evans (1655–1720), Anglo-Irish politician
- George Evans, 1st Baron Carbery (c. 1680–1749), Anglo-Irish politician
- George Evans, 2nd Baron Carbery (died 1759), British politician and Irish peer
- George Evans, 3rd Baron Carbery (died 1783), Anglo-Irish peer
- George Evans, 4th Baron Carbery (1766–1804), British politician
- George Evans (American politician) (1797–1867), American congressman
- George Evans (Australian politician) (1802–1868), politician in Victoria, Australia
- George Henry Evans (1805–1855), American radical reformer
- George Hampden Evans (died 1842), Irish politician
- George S. Evans (1826–1883), Texas Ranger, miner, businessman and political official

== Sports ==
- Rosser Evans (George Rosser Evans, 1867–?), Wales international rugby union player
- George Evans (rugby league) (1941–2015), Australian rugby league player
- George Evans (footballer, born 1864) (1864–1947), English football player (Manchester United)
- George Evans (footballer, born 1935) (1935–2000), Welsh football player
- George Evans (footballer, born 1994), English football player
- George Evans (footballer, born 2005), English football player
- Chick Evans (coach) (1901–1976), American football, basketball, and baseball coach
- George Evans (basketball) (born 1971), American basketball player
- George Evans (cricketer) (1915–1965), Australian cricketer

== Other ==
- George Evans (antiquary) (1630–1702), English antiquary
- George Evans (explorer) (1780–1852), Australian explorer
- George Essex Evans (1863–1909), Australian journalist
- George Evans (VC) (1876–1937), British Army officer
- Sir George de Lacy Evans (1787–1870), British general
- George Roche Evans (1922–1985), American Catholic bishop
