= James Chatterton =

James Chatterton may refer to:

- Jim Chatterton (1864–1944), baseball player
- Sir James Chatterton, 1st Baronet (died 1806), MP for Baltimore and Doneraile, Ireland
- Sir James Chatterton, 3rd Baronet of the Chatterton baronets
- James Chatterton (cricketer) (1836–1891), British cricketer
- James Charles Chatterton (1794–1874), British Army officer and politician

== See also ==
- Chatterton (disambiguation)
