= Percy Freke =

Percy Freke may refer to:

- Sir Percy Freke, 2nd Baronet (1700–1728), member of parliament in the Irish House of Commons
- Percy Freke (politician, died 1707), his grandfather, Irish politician, member of parliament in the Irish House of Commons
- Percy Evans Freke (1844–1931), Irish ornithologist and entomologist
