= Freke baronets of West Bilney (1713) =

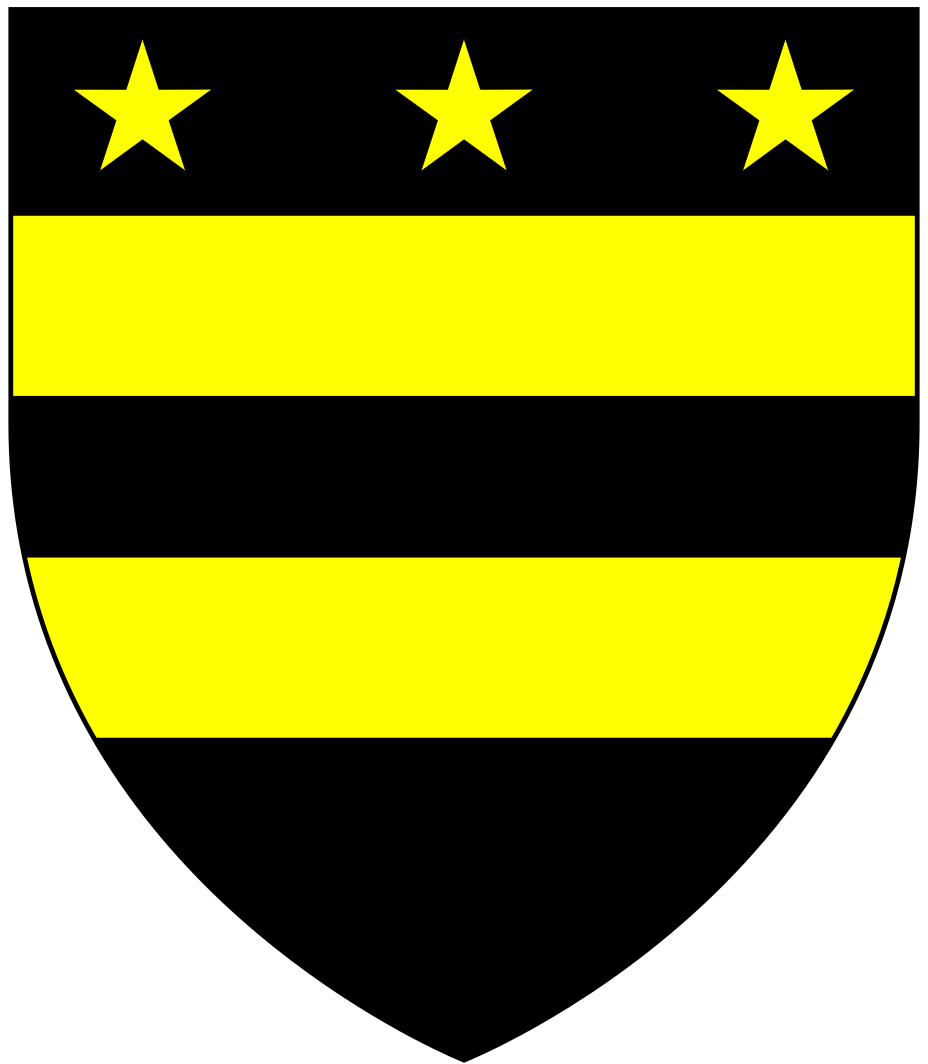
Escutcheon of the Freke baronets of West Bilney

The Freke baronetcy, of West Bilney in the County of Norfolk, was created in the Baronetage of Great Britain on 4 June 1713 for Ralph Freke. The title became extinct on the death of the 3rd Baronet in 1764.

== Freke baronets, of West Bilney (1713) ==
- Sir Ralph Freke, 1st Baronet (1675–1717)
- Sir Percy Freke, 2nd Baronet (1700–1728)
- Sir John Redmond Freke, 3rd Baronet (c. 1707–1764)

== Extended family ==
Grace, the daughter of Sir Ralph Freke and sister of the 2nd and 3rd Baronets, married in 1741 John Evans (died 1777) of Bulgaden Hall, County Limerick, the second son of the 1st Baron Carbery. The baronetcy of Freke of Castle Freke was created in 1768 for their son John; and his son inherited the barony of Carbery.

== Notes ==
Baronetage of Great Britain
Preceded by O'Carroll baronets	Freke baronets of West Bilney; 4 June 1713	Succeeded by Crosse baronets
