= John Evans-Freke =

John Evans-Freke may refer to:

- John Evans-Freke, 6th Baron Carbery (1765–1845), Anglo-Irish politician and peer
- Sir John Evans-Freke, 1st Baronet (1744–1777), Anglo-Irish politician

== See also ==
- John Evans Freke-Aylmer (1838–1907), British army officer, businessman and politician
