= Jocelyn Deane =

Irish politician

Member of Parliament for Helston
- In office 1780

Member of Parliament for Baltimore
- In office 1771–1780

Personal details
- Born: July 1749 Ireland
- Died: 19 November 1780 (aged 31) Lyon, France
- Parent: Robert Deane (father)

Jocelyn Deane JP (July 1749 – 19 November 1780) was an Irish politician.

== Biography ==
He was the third son of Sir Robert Deane, 5th Baronet and his wife Charleton Tilson, second daughter of Thomas Tilson. Deane was a justice of the peace and represented Baltimore in the Irish House of Commons from 1771 until his death in 1780. In the latter year he had stood also for Helston in the British House of Commons, however the election was disputed caused by a double return. Before his case was to be heard, Deane died near Lyon, having been on the way to Nice to recover his health in the Mediterranean climate. In 1781, he was declared elected.

Parliament of Ireland
| Preceded by Sir John Evans-Freke, 1st Bt; Richard Tonson | Member of Parliament for Baltimore; 1771–1780; With: Sir John Evans-Freke, 1st Bt 1771–1777; William Evans 1777–1780 | Succeeded by William Evans; James Chatterton |
Parliament of Great Britain
| Preceded by Francis Cockayne Cust; Philip Yorke | Member of Parliament for Helston; 1780; With: Philip Yorke | Succeeded by Richard Barwell; Philip Yorke |
