= William Abraham Chatterton =

Irish baronet

William Chatterton
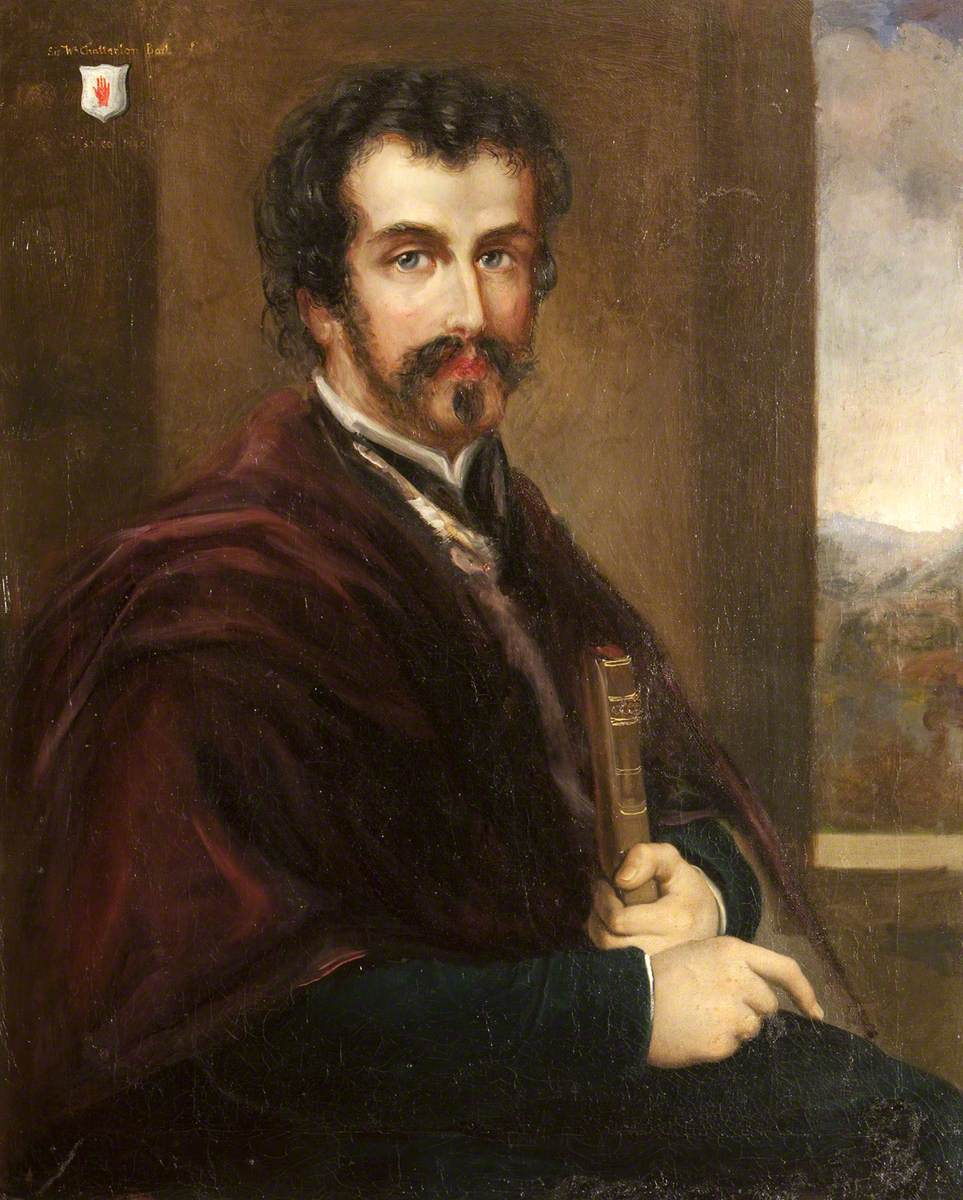

2nd Baronet of Castle Mahon
- Reign: 9 April 1806–1855
- Predecessor: Sir James Chatterton, 1st Baronet
- Successor: James Charles Chatterton
- Born: 5 August 1794
- Died: 1855 (aged 60–61)
- Noble family: Chatterton
- Spouse: Henrietta-Georgiana Iremongor
- Father: Sir James Chatterton, 1st Baronet
- Mother: Rebecca Lane

Sir William Abraham Chatterton, 2nd Baronet (1794–1855) was an Irish baronet.

Chatterton was educated at Trinity College, Dublin. He was succeeded by his brother Sir James Charles Chatterton, 3rd Baronet.

== Arms ==
Coat of arms of William Abraham Chatterton

Notes
Granted 1 July 1801 by Chichester Fortescue (Ulster).
Crest
An antelope's head erased Argent horned Or and pierced through the neck with an arrow.
Escutcheon
Or a lion head erased Azure between three mullets Gules.
Motto
Loyal A Mort

Baronetage of the United Kingdom
Preceded by Sir James Chatterton, 1st Baronet	Baronet (of Castle Mahon); 9 April 1806–1855	Succeeded by Sir James Charles Chatterton, 3rd Baronet
