= John Redmond Freke =

Irish baronet (??–1764)

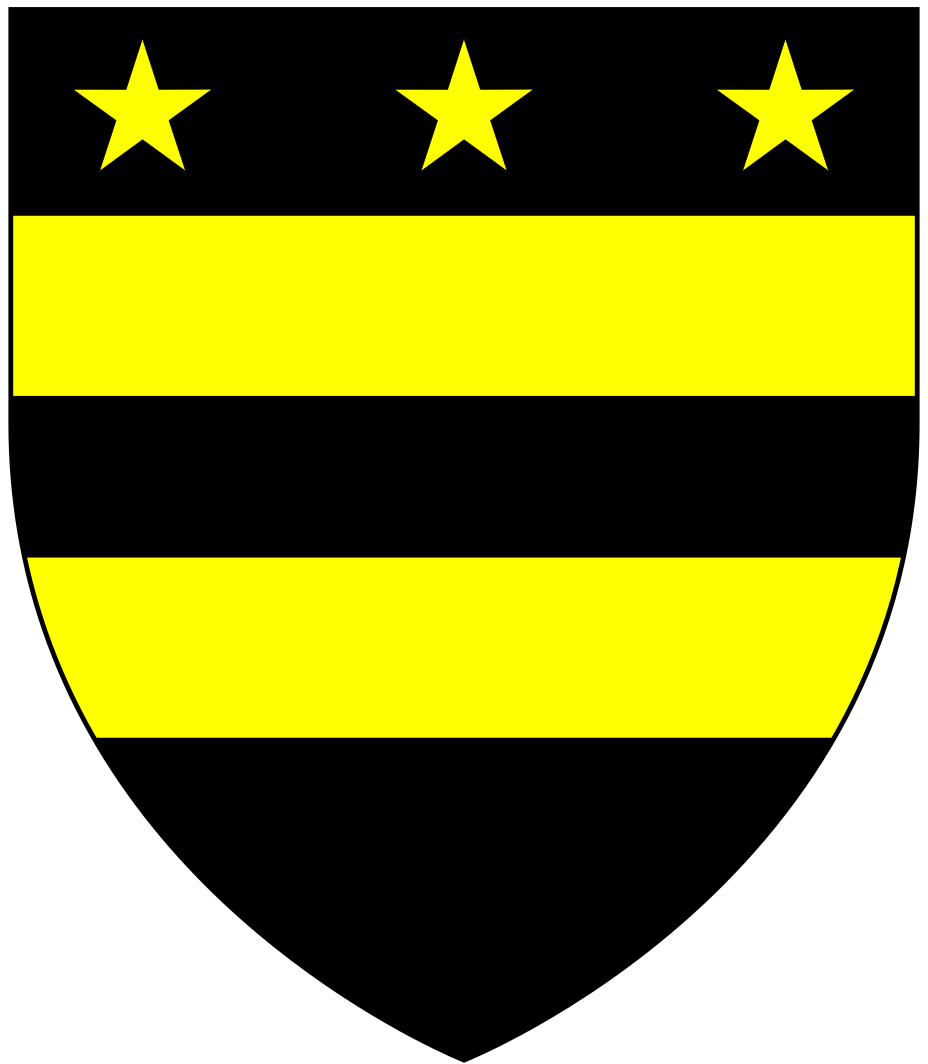
Arms of Freke: Sable, two bars or in chief three mullets of the last

Sir John Redmond Freke, 3rd Baronet (died 13 April 1764) was a baronet in the Baronetage of Great Britain and a member of parliament in the Irish House of Commons.

He was the younger son of Sir Ralph Freke, 1st Baronet, by his wife Elizabeth, the daughter of Sir John Meade, 1st Baronet. Elizabeth Meade's mother was Elizabeth Redman, the daughter and co-heir of Colonel Daniel Redman of Ballylinch, County Kilkenny. John Redmond Freke succeeded to the baronetcy bestowed on his father on 10 April 1728, on the death of his elder brother Percy, the second baronet.

He was M.P. for Baltimore (a constituency previously represented by his grandfather Percy Freke) from 1728 until 1760, and for the city of Cork from 1761 until his death. He was Sheriff of Cork in 1750, and Mayor of Cork in 1753.

He married Mary Brodrick, the fourth daughter and co-heir of the Hon. St John Brodrick (died 1728), (eldest son of Alan Brodrick, 1st Viscount Midleton) by Anne Hill, the sister of Trevor Hill, 1st Viscount Hillsborough, and Arthur Hill-Trevor, 1st Viscount Dungannon. She died at Castle Freke, County Cork, on 20 June 1761, and was buried at Midleton, County Cork. He died without issue on 13 April 1764, and the baronetcy became extinct. His estate was inherited by his sister Grace, who had married Hon. John Evans, a younger son of George Evans, 1st Baron Carbery.

Parliament of Ireland
Preceded by Sir Percy Freke, 2nd Bt; Richard Tonson	Member of Parliament for Baltimore; 1728–1761; With: Richard Tonson	Succeeded by William Clements; Richard Tonson
Preceded by Thomas Newenham; Emanuel Pigott	Member of Parliament for Cork City; 1761–1764; With: John Hely-Hutchinson	Succeeded by John Hely-Hutchinson; William Brabazon Ponsonby
Baronetage of Great Britain
Preceded by Percy Freke	Baronet of West Bilney; 1728–1764	Extinct
