= George Evans, 2nd Baron Carbery =

British politician

George Evans, 2nd Baron Carbery (died 2 February 1759), known until 1749 as Hon. George Evans, was a British politician. Like his father, he represented Westbury as a Whig. Evans entered the British House of Commons in 1734 as a supporter of the Walpole administration. He was in financial difficulties by 1743, and did not stand for election again in 1747. Succeeding his father as an Irish peer in 1749, he sat in the Irish House of Lords until his death a decade later.

== Biography ==
Evans was the eldest son of George Evans, 1st Baron Carbery and his wife Anne. On 23 May 1732, he married Hon. Frances FitzWilliam (d. 30 July 1789), the second daughter of Richard FitzWilliam, 5th Viscount FitzWilliam and Frances Shelley. Upon their marriage, Evans was given the Laxton Hall estate of his mother, worth £1,100 per year, and an annuity on the family's Irish estates worth £1,400 per year. Evans and his wife had four children:

- George Evans, 3rd Baron Carbery (d. 1783)
- John Evans, 5th Baron Carbery (1738–1807)
- William Evans, died young
- Hon. Frances Anne Evans (d. 12 July 1802), married Edward Warter Wilson, of Bilboa House, on September 1756, and afterwards married Eleazar Davy, of Ubbeston Hall, Suffolk

At the 1734 election, Evans stood for Westbury as a Whig, together with John Bance. They narrowly defeated James Bertie and William Phipps, (Note: Probably William Phipps of Heywood, Wiltshire.) Tory candidates backed by the Earl of Abingdon. Bance joined the opposition Whigs, while Evans, though he voted against ratifying the Convention of Pardo in 1739, was afterwards classed as a Government supporter.

In the 1741 election, the Abingdon interest supported Norreys Bertie and Bance; Evans and Joseph Townsend stood as Government Whigs, and defeated their opponents with large majorities. Evans continued to support the administration throughout the following Parliament. By September 1743, he was in financial difficulties. His creditors included the Earl of Egmont, to whom he owed over £900 on an annuity of £200 per year dating from 1734.

Evans did not stand at the 1747 election. He succeeded his father as Baron Carbery in 1749 and took his seat in the Irish House of Lords. His financial affairs continued to deteriorate: by 1758, of £5,000 per year from his Irish estates, only £1,000 was available to him, the rest going to service his debts. Lord Carbery died on 2 February 1759 and was succeeded by his eldest son George.

== Notes ==
Parliament of Great Britain
Preceded by Francis Annesley; John Hoskins Gifford	Member of Parliament for Westbury; 1734–1747; With: John Bance 1734–1741; Joseph Townsend 1741–1747	Succeeded by John Bance; Paul Methuen
Peerage of Ireland
Preceded by George Evans	Baron Carbery; 1749–1759	Succeeded by George Evans
