= Sir John Evans-Freke, 1st Baronet =

Anglo-Irish politician

Sir John Evans-Freke, 1st Baronet (1744 – 20 March 1777) was an Anglo-Irish politician.

Born John Evans, he was the son of Hon. John Evans, a younger son of George Evans, 1st Baron Carbery, and Grace, daughter and heiress of Sir Ralph Freke, 1st Baronet. Between 1768 and his death he sat in the Irish House of Commons as the Member of Parliament for Baltimore. He was created a baronet, of Castle Freke in the Baronetage of Ireland, in 1768. Evans later assumed the surname of Freke. Upon his death, his title passed to his son, John Evans-Freke, who inherited the family peerage in 1807.

Parliament of Ireland
Preceded by William Clements; Richard Tonson	Member of Parliament for Baltimore; 1768–1777; With: Richard Tonson (1768–1771); Jocelyn Deane (1771–1777)	Succeeded by William Evans; Jocelyn Deane
Baronetage of Ireland
New creation	Baronet (of Castle Freke); 1768–1777	Succeeded by John Evans-Freke
