= Francis Annesley (1663–1750) =

Irish lawyer and politician

Francis Annesley, FRS (October 1663 – 7 April 1750) was an Irish lawyer and politician who sat in the Irish House of Commons between 1692 and 1714, in the English House of Commons from 1705 to 1708 and in the British House of Commons between 1708 and 1734.

== Early life ==
Annesley was the eldest son of the Hon. Francis Annesley of Castlewellan, County Down and his wife Deborah Jones, daughter of Henry Jones, Bishop of Meath. He entered Trinity College, Dublin in 1679 and qualified BA in 1682 and LL.B. and LL.D in 1725. He was admitted at the Inner Temple in 1684 and remained in London during the conflict in Ireland. He was called to the bar in 1690. He made a financially beneficial marriage to Elizabeth Martin, the daughter of Joseph Martin, a London merchant, on 5 July 1695. In 1700 he became a Director of the New East India Company. He was elected a Fellow of the Royal Society in 1704.

== Political career ==
Annesley was originally an Irish country whig and sought to protect Protestant interests against both Catholic and Scottish Presbyterian influences. He was elected MP for Downpatrick in the Parliament of Ireland in 1695, sitting until he was expelled in 1703. He was a Commissioner of inquiry into forfeited estates in Ireland from 1699 to 1700, and a trustee for sale from 1700 to 1703.

At the 1705 Annesley was returned unopposed as English MP for Preston. He was returned unopposed as MP for Westbury on Lord Abingdon's interest at the 1708 general election. He was elected there in a contest in 1710 and returned unopposed in 1713. He was also MP for Downpatrick for a third time from 1713 to 1714.

At the 1715 general election, he was initially seated as MP for Westbury after a double return, but was unseated on petition two months later. In October 1716 he was appointed one of the trustees of Lord Bolingbroke's forfeited personal estate. He regained his seat at Westbury in 1722 and retained in it 1727. He voted against the Administration in that Parliament. He did not stand at the 1734 general election

== Later life and legacy ==
Annesley married again twice. In July 1732 he married Elizabeth Gomeldon, widow of William Gomeldon of Summerfield Hall, Kent and daughter of John Cropley of Rochester, Kent. He subsequently married Sarah Lady Fowler, the widow of Sir Richard Fowler, 2nd Baronet, of Harnage Grange, Shropshire and daughter of William Sloane of Portsmouth, Hampshire.

Annesley died in 1750. He had seven sons and two daughters by his first wife. One of his sons was William Annesley, 1st Viscount Glerawly.

Parliament of England
Preceded by Charles Zedenno Stanley; Sir Cyril Wyche	Member of Parliament for Preston; 1705–1708; With: Edward Rigby 1705–1706; Arthur Maynwaring 1706–1708	Succeeded by Henry Fleetwood; Arthur Maynwaring
Parliament of Great Britain
Preceded by Henry Bertie; Robert Bertie	Member of Parliament for Westbury; 1708–1715; With: Henry Bertie 1708–1715	Succeeded by The Lord Carbery; Charles Allanson
Preceded by The Lord Carbery; Charles Allanson	Member of Parliament for Westbury; 1722–1734; With: James Bertie 1722–1723; The Lord Carbery 1723–1727; John Gifford 1727–1734	Succeeded by Hon. George Evans; John Bance
