= Chatterton baronets =

Extinct baronetcy in the Baronetage of the United Kingdom

The Chatterton Baronetcy, of Castle Mahon, in the County and City of Cork, was a title in the Baronetage of the United Kingdom. It was created on 3 August 1801 for James Chatterton, member of the Irish House of Commons for Doneraile (1783) and Baltimore (1781), who also held the offices of King's Serjeant, and Keeper of the State Papers. His family had come to Ireland in the time of Elizabeth I: Thomas Chatterton received a grant of land at Ardee in 1573. The family subsequently moved to County Cork.

The first Baronet had two sons, who each inherited the title in turn. The third Baronet, James Charles, served as MP for County Cork from 1849 to 1852 and as High Sheriff of County Cork for 1851; he was also a distinguished soldier who as a young officer had fought in the Peninsular War and at the Battle of Waterloo, later becoming a General in the British Army. His only son died in infancy, and the baronetcy became extinct on his death in 1874.

== Chatterton baronets, of Castle Mahon (1801) ==
- Sir James Chatterton, 1st Baronet (died 9 April 1806)
- Sir William Abraham Chatterton, 2nd Baronet (5 August 1794 – 1855)
- Sir James Charles Chatterton, 3rd Baronet (1794 – 5 January 1874)

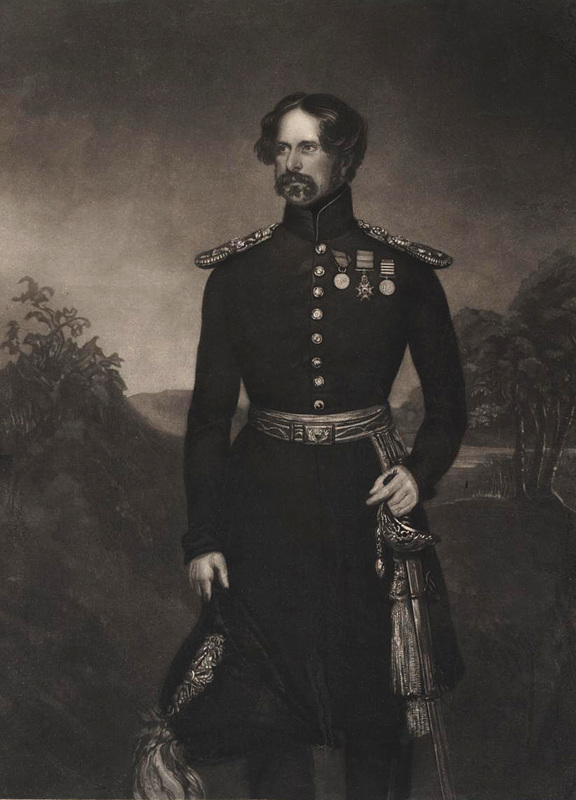
Sir James Charles Chatterton, 3rd Baronet

== Arms ==
Coat of arms of Chatterton baronets
Notes Granted 1 July 1801 by Chichester Fortescue (Ulster). Crest An antelope's head erased Argent horned Or and pierced through the neck with an arrow. Escutcheon Or a lion head erased Azure between three mullets Gules. Motto Loyal A Mort

Baronetage of the United Kingdom
Preceded by Keane baronets	Chatterton baronets of Castle Mahon; 3 August 1801	Succeeded by Hardinge baronets
