= Ralph Freke =

Irish baronet (c.1675–1717)

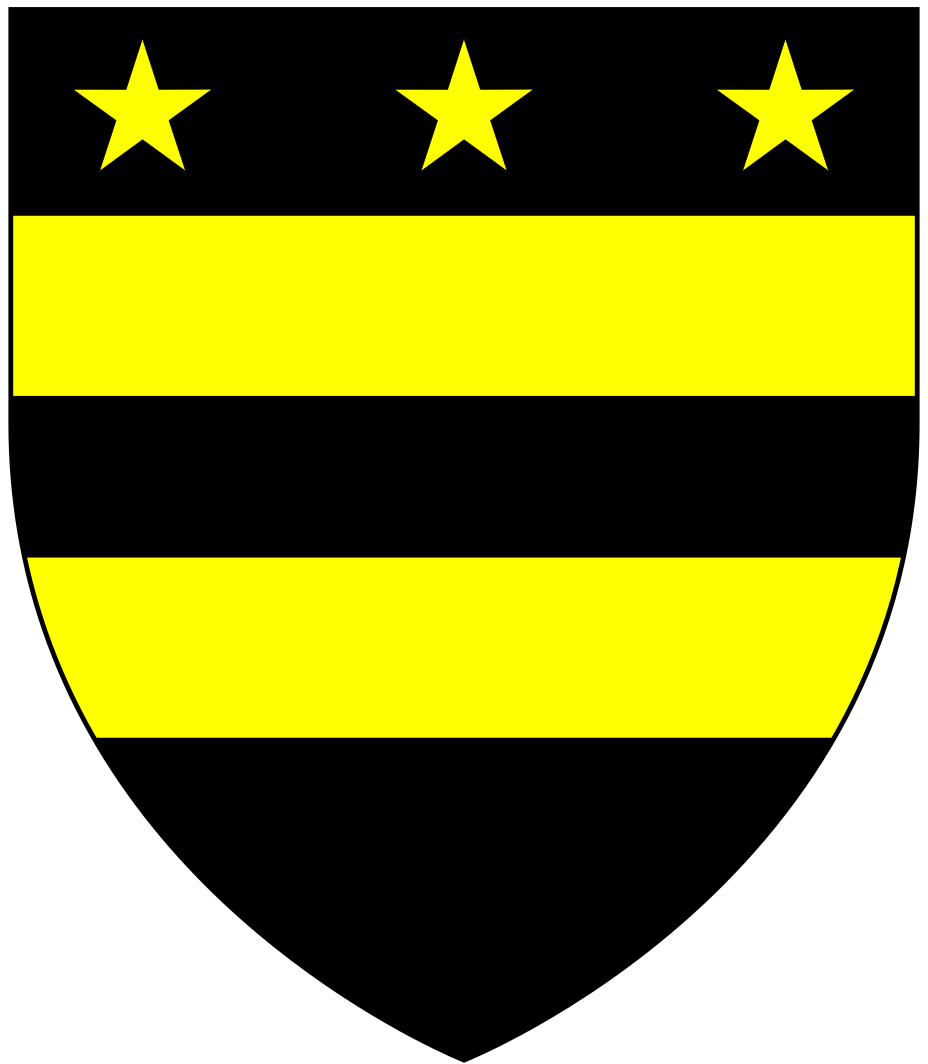
Arms of Freke: Sable, two bars or in chief three mullets of the last

Sir Ralph Freke, 1st Baronet (c. 1675 – 1717) of West Bilney, Norfolk, and Rathbarry (afterwards Castle Freke), County Cork, was a baronet in the Baronetage of Great Britain and a Member of Parliament in the Irish House of Commons.

He was the son and heir of Percy Freke, of Rathbarry, by Elizabeth, the daughter of Ralph Freke of Hannington, Wiltshire and Cicely Culpepper. Percy Freke was the son of Arthur Freke and his wife Dorothy, and was named after his maternal grandfather, Sir Percy Smith of Youghal, County Cork. Percy Freke purchased the estate of West Bilney in Norfolk, was High Sheriff of County Cork in 1694, and was the Member of Parliament in the Irish House of Commons for Clonakilty in 1692–93 and 1695–99, and the member for Baltimore from 1703 until his death in May 1707.

Ralph Freke's mother, Elizabeth Freke, lived from 1641 to 1714. Like other aristocratic women of the time, she cultivated a collection of medical and culinary recipes. From these medical recipes, she would make medicine to treat herself, her son, and her husband in times of sickness. These medicines were used to treat general health concerns, like weakness, as well as specific ailments. she also kept a diary, which chronicles her rather turbulent family life.

Ralph Freke was born after 1673, and was Member of Parliament in the Irish House of Commons for Clonakilty over three parliaments from 1703 until his death in 1717. He was High Sheriff of County Cork in 1709, and was created a baronet on 4 June 1713.

He married Elizabeth, the daughter of Sir John Meade, 1st Baronet and his second wife Elizabeth Redman, daughter of Colonel Daniel Redman of Ballylinch Castle, on 5 March 1699. After his death in 1717, the baronetcy was inherited by his eldest son, Percy; his widow remarried James King, 4th Baron Kingston. His second son, Ralph, died unmarried in 1727, and his third son, John Redmond, also died without issue. The Freke estate was eventually inherited by Ralph Freke's only daughter Grace, who married Hon. John Evans, a younger son of George Evans, 1st Baron Carbery, and his wife Anne Stafford of Laxton, Northamptonshire.

Baronetage of Great Britain
New creation	Baronet (of West Bilney); 1714–1717	Succeeded by Percy Freke
