= John Hoskins Gifford =

British politician

John Hoskins Gifford (c.1693 – 1744), of Beaminster, Dorset, and Boreham, near Warminster, Wiltshire, was a British Tory politician who sat in the House of Commons between 1713 and 1734.

== Biography ==
Gifford was the second son of William Gifford of Beaminster, Dorset, and Horsington, Somerset and his wife Mary Hoskins, daughter of John Hoskins of Beaminster. He matriculated at Wadham College, Oxford on 7 December 1710, aged 17, and was admitted at Middle Temple in 1710. In 1713, he succeeded to the family estates in Wiltshire and Somerset on the death of his brother Benjamin Gifford, M.P.

At the 1713 general election Gifford was returned as Tory Member of Parliament for Bridport but did not stand in 1715 or 1722. At the 1727 election, he was returned as MP for Westbury on the interest of Lord Abingdon and survived a petition against the return. In Parliament he voted against the army estimates in 1732 and the Excise Bill in 1733. He did not stand in 1734.

Gifford married Elizabeth Watts, daughter of Nicholas Watts of Cucklington, Somerset in December 1731. He died without issue in August 1744.

Parliament of Great Britain
Preceded by Thomas Strangways; William Coventry	Member of Parliament for Bridport; 1713–1715; With: William Coventry	Succeeded by John Strangways; William Coventry
Preceded by The Lord Carbery; Francis Annesley	Member of Parliament for Westbury; 1727–1734; With: Francis Annesley	Succeeded by Hon. George Evans; John Bance
