= George Evans, 3rd Baron Carbery =

Irish peer (died 1783)

George Evans, 3rd Baron Carbery (died 1783), known as Hon. George Evans from 1749 to 1759, was an Irish peer. He probably built the house later enlarged as the present Laxton Hall.

He was the eldest son of George Evans, 2nd Baron Carbery and his wife Frances FitzWilliam, daughter of Richard FitzWilliam, 5th Viscount FitzWilliam. He succeeded his father in the title in 1759, and inherited an estate heavily encumbered by his father's debts, and family settlements: he complained in 1760 that of his first half-year's rent, he had to pay £1,000 to his mother and £4,000 to his brother John and sister Frances. On 7 February 1760, he married Lady Juliana Noel (died 18 December 1760), the third daughter of Baptist Noel, 4th Earl of Gainsborough and Elizabeth Chapman. They had one daughter:

- Hon. Juliana Evans (1760 – 20 May 1807), married Edward Hartopp-Wigley, of Dalby House, Leicestershire, on 16 April 1782

After the death of Lady Juliana, Carbery married Elizabeth Horton (died 14 June 1789), daughter of Christopher Horton of Catton Hall, Derbyshire, on 13 December 1762. They had one son:

- George Evans, 4th Baron Carbery (1766–1804)

He probably commissioned W. D. Legg to design the new house at Laxton after 1778. He also held estates in County Limerick, where Jeremiah Jackson was his agent in the 1760s and 1770s.

By 1782, he was nearly blind, and rendered an invalid by gout. After having once refused Hartopp's suit, Carbery's daughter eloped with him, to Carbery's surprise and indignation, although Hartopp, in the end, made a good marriage settlement on her. Carbery died the following year, on 26 May 1783, and was succeeded by his son George. He left the unentailed portion of his Irish estates to his daughter in the event that George died without heirs, a contingency that came to pass in 1804.

Peerage of Ireland
Preceded by George Evans	Baron Carbery; 1759–1783	Succeeded by George Evans
