= Peter Evans-Freke, 11th Baron Carbery =

Peter Ralfe Harrington Evans-Freke, 11th Baron Carbery
- Born: March 20, 1920
- Died: July 28, 2012 (aged 92)
- Occupations: peer, landowner
- Known for: owner of Castle Freke (1970–2012)
- Title: 11th Baron Carbery

Peter Ralfe Harrington Evans-Freke, 11th Baron Carbery (20 March 1920 – 28 July 2012) was the 11th Baron Carbery of Castle Freke from 1970 until his death at the age of 92 in 2012.

== Life ==
He was born in 1920 and his uncle John "JC" Carbery, the 10th Baron, was a noted aviator.

Evans-Freke was educated at Downside, a Benedictine boarding school in Somerset. He later joined the Royal Engineers and during the Second World War saw active service behind enemy lines in Burma, where he took part in raids to destroy Japanese infrastructure. He then served in British India and ended his military service with the rank of captain.

Following World War II, he became a director of an equine and livestock insurance company.

He married firstly Joyzelle, an Australian, and they had three sons and two daughters. In a marriage which lasted more than sixty years, they were frequent visitors to Lourdes.

On 25 December 1970, he succeeded an uncle in the family peerage and baronetcy.

He had an interest in agriculture, music and poetry. He was a Traditionalist Catholic, and became a Military Knight of Malta, one of the most prominent military orders of the Roman Catholic Church.

Following his wife's death in 2006, he married again, remaining with his second wife, Elisabeth, until his death in July 2012.

His body was entombed in the ancient family vault, the crypt of the ruined chapel of Castle Freke in West Cork, following a funeral ceremony and Tridentine Mass at the church in Rathbarry. His remains were placed next to those of his first wife, who was interred there in 2006. It was the first time the vault at Castle Freke had been opened since 1852. His religious beliefs were reflected in the placing of a rosary on his coffin for the Mass.

He was outlived by his second wife, Elisabeth, Lady Carbery, and his five children, and was succeeded by his son Michael Evans-Freke, 12th Baron Carbery.

Peerage of Ireland
Preceded by John Evans-Freke	Baron Carbery; 1970–2012	Succeeded by Michael Evans-Freke
