= Castlefreke =

Village in County Cork, Ireland

Castlefreke Ráth an Bharraigh Rathbarry
- Village
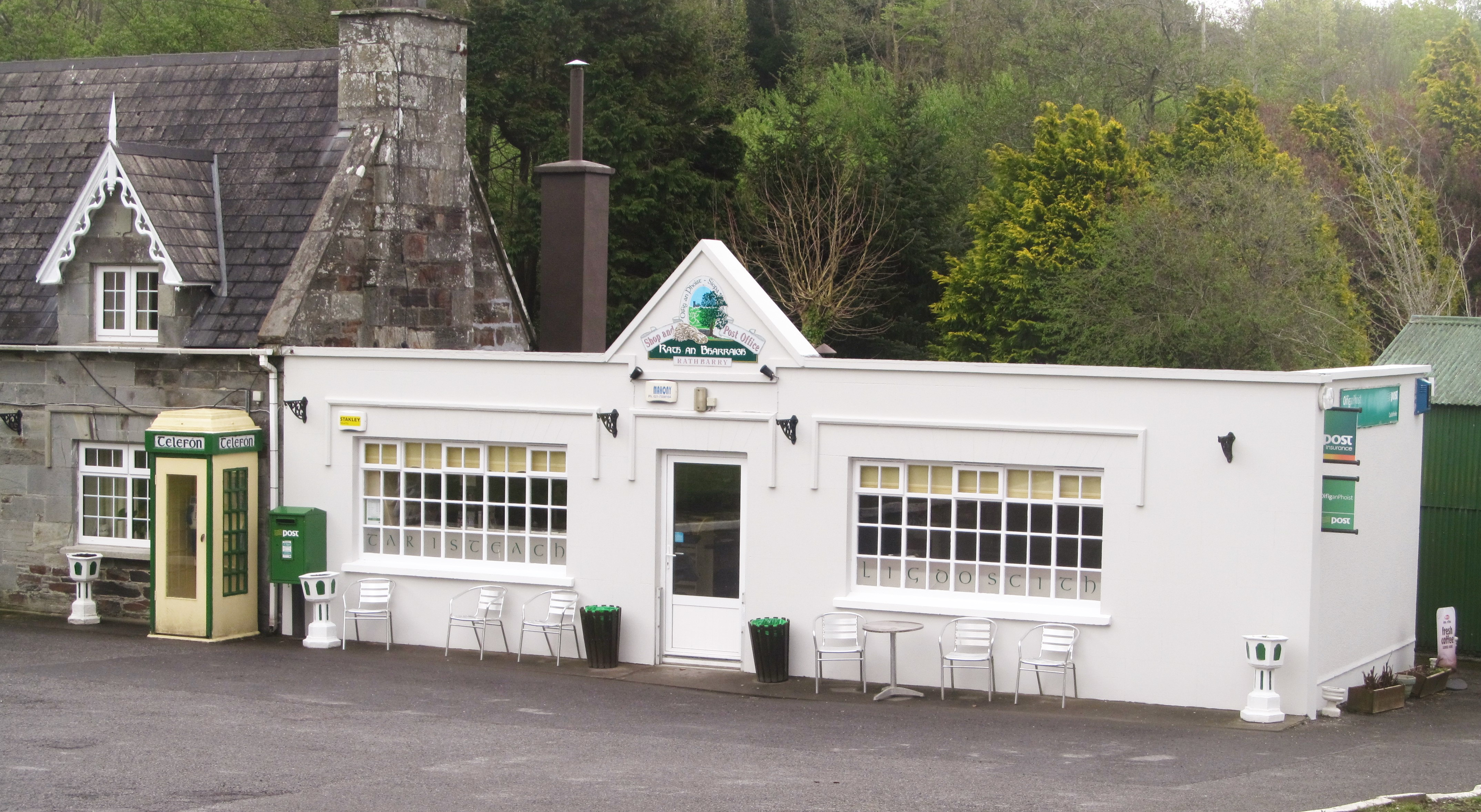
- Rathbarry shop and post office

- Location in Ireland
- Coordinates: 51°34′21″N 8°57′49″W
- Country: Ireland
- Province: Munster
- County: County Cork
- Time zone: UTC+0 (WET)
  - Summer (DST): UTC-1 (IST (WEST))

Castlefreke, also known as Rathbarry (Irish: Ráth an Bharraigh), is a townland and village in County Cork, Ireland. The townland is located in the civil parish of Rathbarry on the R598 regional road, to the east of Rosscarbery.

== Name ==
The townland takes its common Irish language name (Ráth an Bharraigh or 'Rathbarry' meaning "fort of the Barrys") and its official English language name ('Castlefreke') from a large castle and estate in the area. Built in the 15th century, this castle was originally associated with the Barry family and known as Rathbarry. Acquired by the Freke family in the 17th century, the castle and its estate was renamed to become known as Castle Freke.

The village is still commonly known as Rathbarry, while the nearby townland, woods and dune system are commonly known as Castlefreke.

== Village ==
Rathbarry village has won several awards, including "Ireland's tidiest village" in the 1999 national Tidy Towns Competition and the overall "Ireland's best kept town" award in a 2017 all-island competition.

To the south and west of Rathbarry village are a beach, Long Strand, and a Coillte managed woodland, Castlefreke Woods. Behind Long Strand beach is a natural sedimentary lagoon, Kilkeran Lake, and a dunes system, Castlefreke Dunes. The lake and dunes form a protected Special Area of Conservation.

== Castle ==
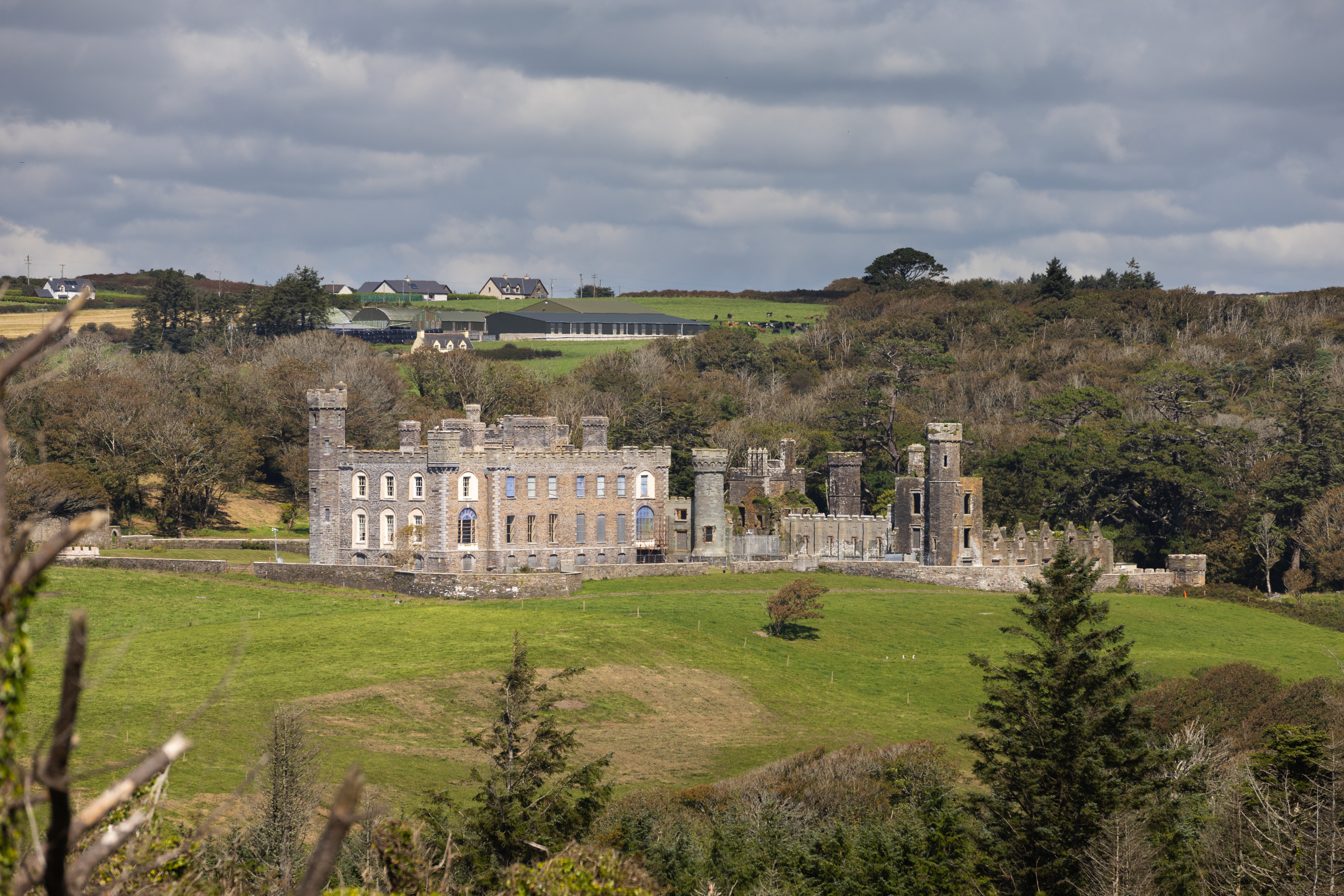
View of Castle Freke from one of the Castlefreke trekking routes

The large castle and estate which dominates the area was originally the site of a 15th-century tower house that was owned by the Barry family.

The Freke family, who arrived in Ireland in the seventeenth century, acquired a number of estates in West Cork, including the former Barry castle. In 1642, during the Eleven Years' War, the Freke family were forced to defend the castle from Confederate Irish forces during a sustained siege.

Following an intermarriage with members of the Evans family, the combined Evans-Freke dynasty became Barons of Carbery in the early 18th century. The original 15th-century tower house was damaged by fire and other events, and John Evans-Freke, 6th Baron Carbery built a new castle on the estate in 1780. The older (Barry) fortification was incorporated into the estate's farm buildings.

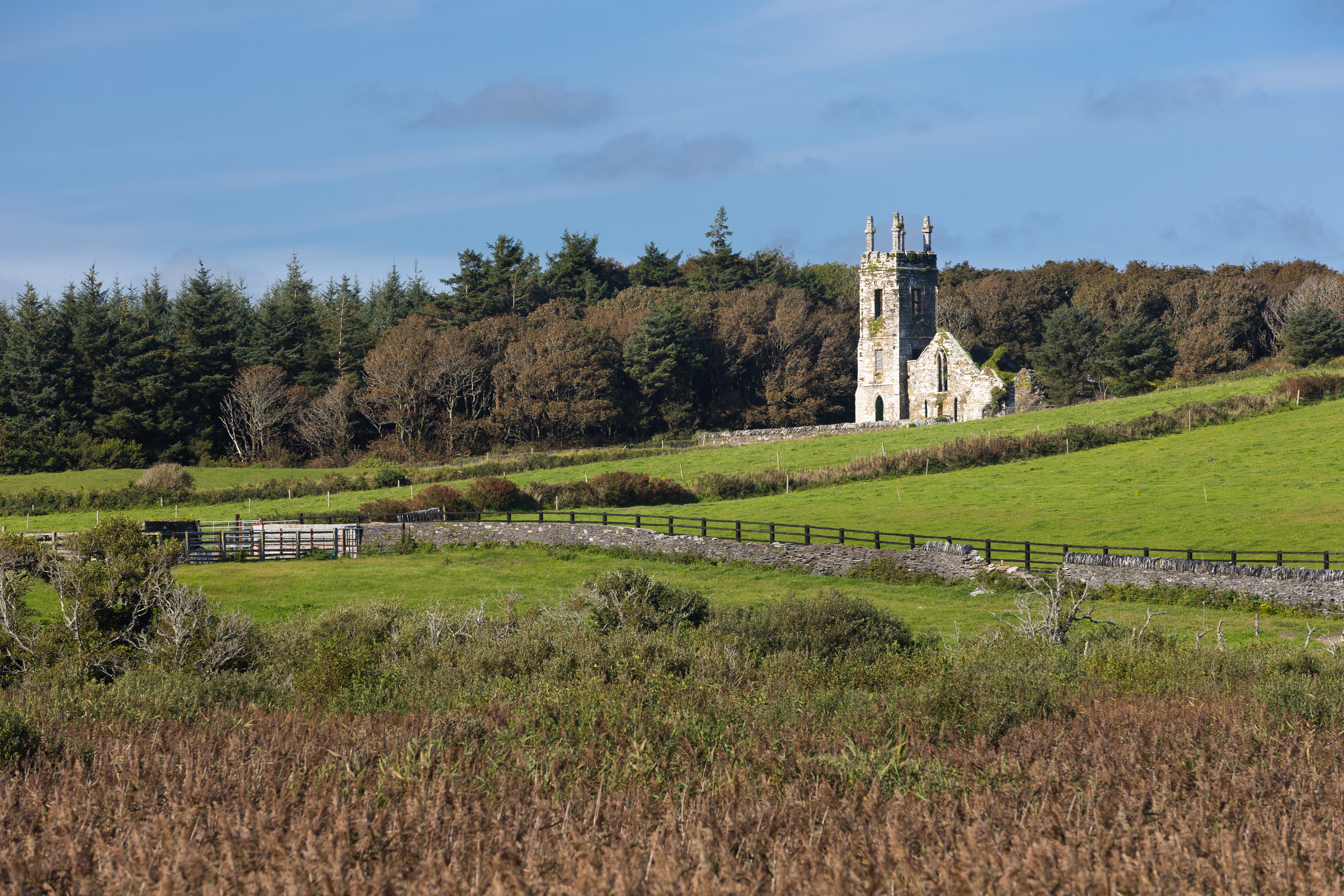
Church ruins

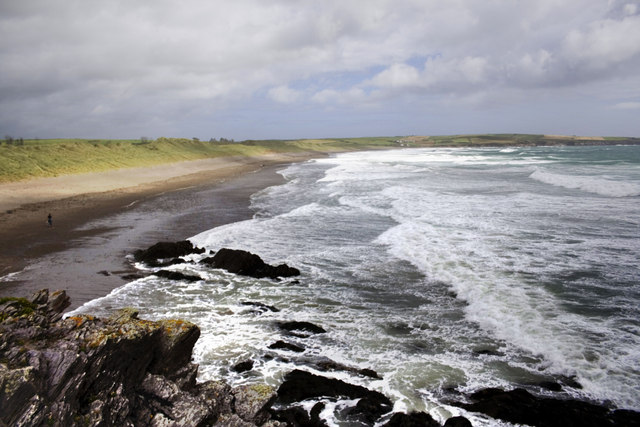
Castlefreke's dune system, behind Long Strand beach, is a Special Area of Conservation

Following a fire in the early 20th century, Castle Freke was sold by John Evans-Freke, 10th Baron Carbery, and the estate and its lands passed to the Irish Land Commission. The building was used as a military barracks during The Emergency (WWII) before being partially dismantled in the 1950s. Remaining as a ruin for several decades, the castle was purchased in 2005 by a descendant of the Evans-Freke family, who (as of 2019) was restoring the building.

The demesne is surrounded by a well-preserved wall of rubble stone which runs uninterrupted for several kilometers. The ruins of two churches, one dating to at least 17th century and another to the 19th century, together with an adjacent graveyard, are located on the castle's demesne.

A 30-feet cross dedicated to Baron Carbery, the highest memorial cross in Ireland, is located on a hill which is traversed by a local walking trail.

== See also ==
- Freke baronets
