= O'Carroll baronets =

The O'Carroll baronetcy, of Denton, Yorkshire, was a title in the Baronetage of Great Britain that was apparently created in or before 1712 for the military commander Daniel O'Carroll, although there is no official record of its creation.

The 1st Baronet later became a Lieutenant-General in the British Army. The 4th Baronet was British Resident at Saxe-Weimar. The title became either extinct or dormant on the death of the 6th baronet in 1835.

== O'Carroll baronets, of Denton (1712?) ==
- Sir Daniel O'Carroll, 1st Baronet (died 1750)
- Sir Daniel O'Carroll, 2nd Baronet (c. 1717–1758)
- Sir John O'Carroll, 3rd Baronet (1722–c.1780)
- Sir John Whitley O'Carroll, 4th Baronet (died 1818)
- Sir Jervoise O'Carroll, 5th Baronet (died 1831)
- Sir John Whitley Christopher O'Carroll, 6th Baronet (died 1835)

Baronetage of Great Britain
Preceded by Calverley baronets	O'Carroll baronets of Denton c.1712	Succeeded by Freke baronets
