= Elizabeth Freke =

English memoirist, poet and cookery writer

Elizabeth Freke (1641–1714) was an English memoirist and poet, known for her diaries and remembrances, but also for a collection of recipes covering medicine and cooking. Her poetry includes a dramatic dialogue between Eve and the Serpent of Eden.

== Family and life ==
Elizabeth Freke was born in 1641 in Hannington, Wiltshire into the wealthy Royalist household of Ralph Freke and Cicely Culpeper. Her mother, one of the eight daughters of Sir Thomas Colepeper of Hollingbourne, died when she was just seven years old, leaving her the eldest woman in the house of her four sisters (including Frances, later Lady Norton). She was brought up mainly by an aunt in Kent. Her father was a lawyer in London, England who had an estate in both Kent and Wiltshire in later years. The estate also belonged to Elizabeth's maternal aunt.

In 1672, Freke married at the age of 30 her second cousin, Percy Freke of Rathbury Castle, County Cork, Ireland, after seven years of courtship. The wedding took place "withoutt my deer Fathers Consentt or knowledg. In A most dreadfull Raynie day." At the time, this was considered to be a relatively late age for a woman to marry and start a family. They were believed to have married for love in Covent Garden.

On 2 June 1675 she gave birth to their only son Ralph Freke. The marriage between Elizabeth and Percy was not very happy and often the topic of diary entries. In fact, they did not live in the same household for much of their marriage. She was estranged from her son due to their living apart for months at a time. Elizabeth spent most of her time in a Norfolk estate given to her by her father. At one point later in the marriage, Percy returned to Ireland and left Elizabeth with her son and scarcely any money. She then left to visit her sister until 1685, and her son shortly after fell ill with smallpox, but recovered. In 1704, Percy came to live with Elizabeth in Norfolk, but due to illness, he died in her arms two years later.

== Reparation of the Church of St. Cecilia and excommunication ==
Elizabeth Freke had an unsteady relationship with her husband as he financially drained her of her resources. She increasingly used her remaining resources for her involvement with the church of St Cecilia, spending personal time and money for its repair. As she grew more involved, she began to assert her dominance on the church, as she felt that she had gained the control from her financial contributions. On 14 February 1713, Charles Trimnell, the Bishop of Norwich, instructed the vicar of Gayton to bar her from the church entirely. He excommunicated her in 1714.

== Collections ==
Elizabeth Freke was a devoted reader and a known collector of medical writings and other literature. Freke's inventory of medical writings was quite grand, and based on one of her notebooks, she had more than 100 titles collected. She stored these books in her residence located in Bilney, Norfolk in two separate rooms. In those storages, she had books not just about medicine, but also books relating to religion, history, and other subjects. One of the books in her inventory was a thick vellum-bound folio-sized book containing a plethora information that varied. The book was used from both ends, one side was written about Culinary information and when the book was flipped to the other side, there was information regarding medicine. In between the book she had information such as medical reading notes, remembrances, and copies of letters. Although she collected much writing about medical knowledge, she didn't limit herself to just that, but other forms of knowledge as well

== Poetry ==
Four works of poetry by Elizabeth Freke have survived. Three of these are highly dramatic dialogues, one of them between Eve and the Serpent of Eden.

== Death and burial ==
In reference to her death, Elizabeth Freke had initially wanted to be buried next to her husband in the vault she had supported. As a result of her banishment from the church, she was not permitted to do such a thing. She was buried in Westminster Abbey when she died in 1714 at age 69.

== Elizabeth Freke's Book of Common Prayer ==
This common prayer book was given to West Bilney church in 1710 and is the oldest book remaining from St Cecilia's Church. After the death of her husband, she presented the church of West Bilney with his bible and communion plate. Elizabeth Freke noted this gift as being to "my church of West Bilney", as if it were her own.

The book was leather-bound with a piece on the front engraved with a classical temple with statues of saints. The Latin words "Domus Orationis," or "House of Prayer" are also written. There are decorated pictorial squares throughout the book which highlight its expense and quality. The book was relatively small as it lacks metrical psalms. The book has been since repaired in 1964.

There was an ongoing dispute in regard to her efforts within the church and her failure to pay tithes. She believed that she had donated enough by paying the curate and for the upkeep of the church. A few years later, she was officially banished from the church and died the following year.

== The Freke Papers ==
The Freke Papers refers to the two manuscript books that Elizabeth created. In these books, she completes many diary entries that give us an insight into how she lived her life. Also within these manuscript books, she wrote notes from published medical books to which she had access, and other recipe books she found. She collected medical remedies from these recipe books and published medical writings from her findings. With her knowledge of these precedented examples, she prepared some of her own remedies as she consulted with other physicians and medical practitioners of the time. She even kept a personal inventory list of the ingredients for her medical recipes, along with the remedies themselves. It is known that she had stockpiles of many common 'cure-all' recipes of the time like Aqua Mirabolus, Ague Water, Poppy Water, and Cowslip Wine.

These recipe books were passed down from family members and Elizabeth continued to add her own writings to them. The original manuscript books are currently at the British Library under archives and manuscripts, but there is a published version edited by Mary Carbery called Mrs. Elizabeth Freke, Her Diary 1671 to 1714. Carbery transcribed from Elizabeth's original manuscripts and rewrote her entries in chronological order, leaving out some of Elizabeth's collected recipes and all of her inventory lists.
