= Frances, Lady Norton =

English religious poet and prose writer

Frances, Lady Norton (née Freke; 1644 – 20 February 1731) was an English religious poet and prose writer who primarily wrote about grief and particularly the loss of her daughter, Grace Gethin. She was a sister of the memoirist Elizabeth Freke.

== Life ==
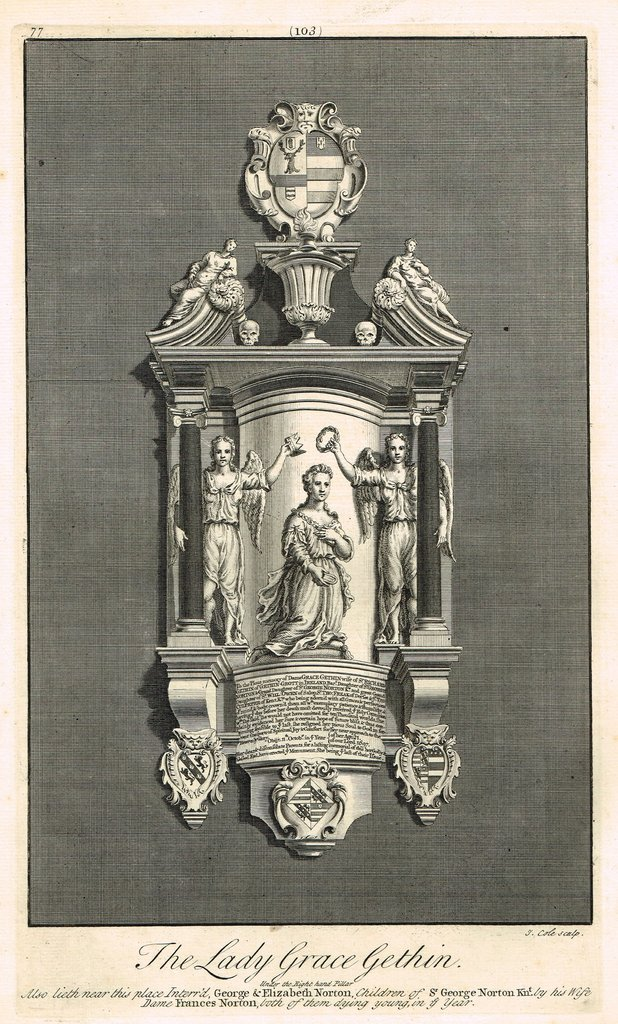
Lady Grace Gethin's memorial in Westminster Abbey. She is flanked by her mother and a friend

She was born Frances Freke, daughter of Ralph Freke and Cicely Culpepper, daughter of Sir Thomas Colepeper of Hollingbourne, in Oxford, and married Sir George Norton in 1672. This George Norton was the son of Sir George Norton who hid Charles II at the time of the regicide of Charles I. The couple had three children, but only one, Grace, survived infancy.

Grace died aged twenty-one, and Frances Norton went into a deep state of grief. Monuments to her daughter were created at Hollingbourne Church and in the south transept of Westminster Abbey. She published a collection of Grace's own writings, Reliquae Gethinianae, in 1699, and in 1705 she wrote two tracts on grieving and consolation. These were The Applause of Virtue and Memento mori, or, Meditations on Death, which were sold together in a quarto. They were dedicated to two women who had helped Lady Norton in her grief and who had themselves experienced a recent loss. The books are pious and collect together consoling thoughts from Christian, Classical, and philosophical literature. In 1714, she produced A miscellany of poems, compos'd, and work'd with a needle, on the backs and seats &c. of several chairs and stools. According to near contemporaries, Frances Norton did a great deal of needlepoint work on furniture in Abbots Leigh (where the Norton estate was). She composed her own short poems, almost always with a pious theme, for such embroidery.

In 1710 she was so ill that her family were wrongly informed of her death, but she recovered. In 1715, her husband died. She married his cousin, Colonel Ambrose Norton, in 1718, and, when he died, married a man named William Jones in 1724. She outlived her third husband by a few years and was buried in Westminster Abbey.
