= Kilkeran Lake =

Lake in County Cork, Ireland

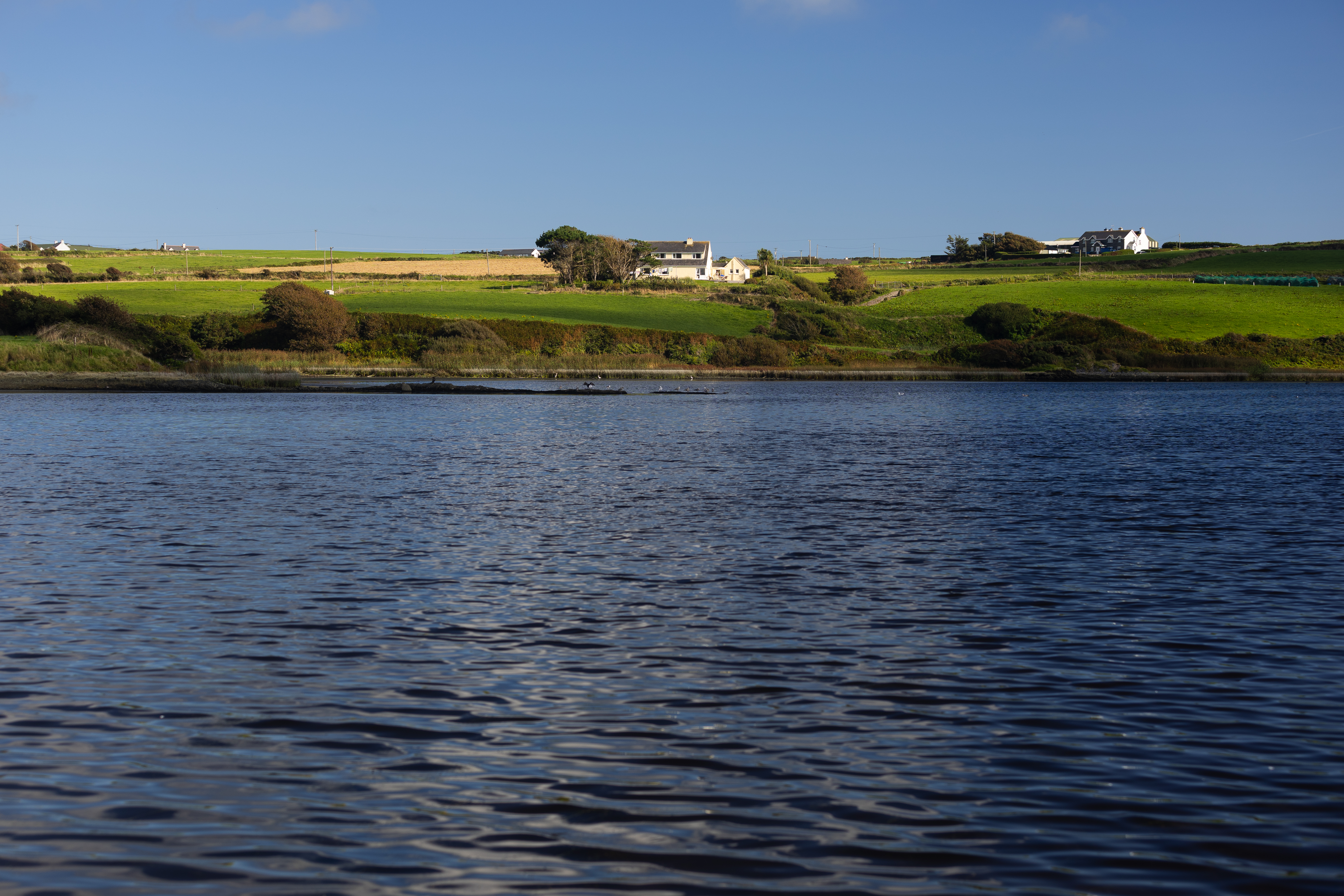
- Kilkeran Lake, view from the western side

- Location in Ireland
- Location: Ireland
- Coordinates: 51°33′29″N 8°57′17″W
- Lake type: sedimentary lagoon
- Primary outflows: Long Strand River and Glandore Bay
- Basin countries: Ireland
- Surface area: 16 ha (40 acres)
- Max. depth: 3 m (9.8 ft)

Kilkeran Lake is a natural sedimentary lagoon in the townland of Castlefreke in County Cork, Ireland. Its southern shore is approx. 300 meters away from the ocean shore of the Glandore Bay, and separated by the Long Strand beach, a system of dunes, and a road. The Long Strand River connects it to the ocean.
