= Michael Evans-Freke, 12th Baron Carbery =

Michael Peter Evans-Freke, 12th Baron Carbery (born 11 October 1942), is a peer in the Peerage of Ireland.

He was educated at Downside School, Christ Church, Oxford (MA, 1969), the University of Strathclyde (MBA), and King's College London (PGCE).

The son of Peter Evans-Freke, 11th Baron Carbery, and Joyzelle Mary Binnie, he succeeded to the peerage upon his father's death in 2012. The heir apparent to the title is his son, Hon. Dominic Ralfe Cecil Evans-Freke (born 1969).

Peerage of Ireland
Preceded by Peter Evans-Freke	Baron Carbery; 2012–present	Incumbent; Heir apparent: Hon. Dominic Evans-Freke
