= John Freke =

John Freke may refer to:

- John Freke (MP) (c. 1591–1641), English politician
- John Freke (surgeon) (1688–1756), English surgeon
- John Redmond Freke (d. 1764), politician in Ireland
