= Grace Gethin =

English essayist

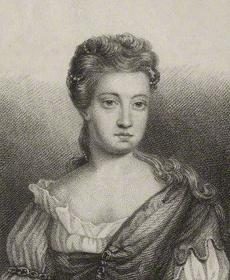
- 1699 engraving
- Born: 1676
- Died: 1697 (aged 20–21)
- Writing career
- Genre: Essayist

Grace Gethin (née Norton; 1676–1697) was an English essayist. She died young and her parents paid for memorials to her.

== Life ==
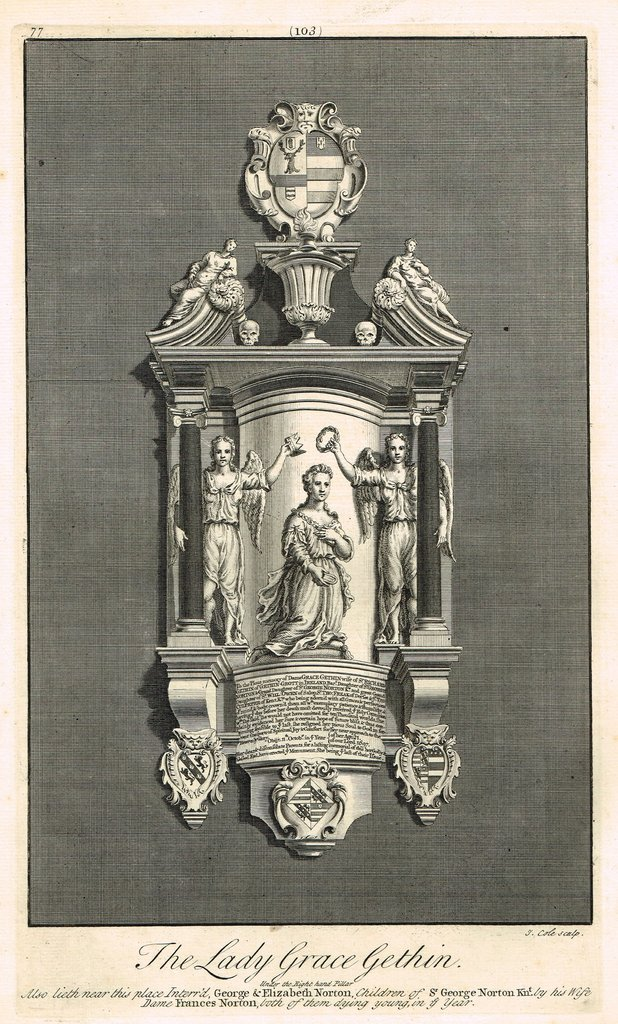
Grace Gethin memorial in Westminster Abbey, 1723 engraving

Gethin was born in 1676, probably at Abbotsleigh. She was the last child of Frances Norton, Lady Norton and her husband Sir George Norton. They had already had two children who had died young.

Gethin married an Irish aristocrat, Sir Richard Gethin, 2nd Baronet, of Gethinsgrott, County Cork. They had no children. After her death, her widower remarried Sarah Farnham, by whom he had at least one son, the third Sir Richard. He died in 1709, aged 35.

She died aged 21 after taking communion the day before. She was buried in Hollingbourne Church where there is a memorial to her. Her parents paid for another memorial in Westminster Abbey and a sermon to be read every Ash Wednesday to remember her life. Her mother wrote books about her grief.

After her death, 29 essays were published with her as the nominal author. Later analysis reveals that Francis Bacon's words appear without attribution in a quarter of them.
