= John Evans, 5th Baron Carbery =

Irish peer

John Evans, 5th Baron Carbery (1738 – 4 March 1807), known until 1804 as Hon. John Evans, was an Irish peer.

Evans was the second son of George Evans, 2nd Baron Carbery and his wife Frances. He married Emilia Crowe (died 6 January 1806) on 15 April 1759; she was his first cousin once removed, the daughter of his father's aunt Emilia. They had four children:

- Emily Frances Evans (7 December 1759 – 1771)
- Maj. Hon. John William Evans (31 March 1763 – 31 December 1804) was commissioned an ensign in the 52nd Regiment of Foot on 27 June 1780. He was promoted to a lieutenancy in 1781. In 1791, Lt. Evans led the forlorn hope of the storming party that took Bangalore. Promoted to captain in 1792, he was probably with the regiment when it landed at Negombo to occupy Ceylon. On 23 July 1799, he exchanged into the 19th Regiment of Foot. He was promoted to a major on 1 January 1800. In April 1802, he was appointed commandant at Calpentyn, but was detached in 1803 to join Hay MacDowall's forces in the attack on Kandy. Evans led the advance guard that entered the city after its abandonment by Sri Vikrama Rajasinha. Returning to Calpentyn, he was appointed commander of Mannar on 8 October 1803. In March 1804, he took command at Arippu during the absence of Major Beaver, and in October, went from Mannar to the coast of Ceylon for three months. He died at Jaffna on 31 December, probably while returning to Mannar.
- Hon. Frances Dorothea Evans (3 July 1764 – ?), married William Preston in 1789
- Hon. Maria Juliana Evans (29 September 1769 – June 1847), married Thomas Barry of Leigh's Brook, Meath, on 12 February 1796

He died on 4 March 1807, without surviving male issue, and was succeeded by his first cousin once removed, Sir John Evans-Freke, 2nd Baronet.

Peerage of Ireland
Preceded by George Evans	Baron Carbery; 1804–1807	Succeeded by John Evans-Freke
