= Baltimore (Parliament of Ireland constituency) =

Pre-1801 Irish constituency

- Former borough constituency for the Irish House of Commons
- County: County Cork
- Borough: Baltimore

1614–1801
- Replaced by: Disfranchised

Baltimore was a potwalloper constituency represented in the Irish House of Commons from 1614 to 1801.

== Borough ==
This constituency was a parliamentary borough based in the town of Baltimore in County Cork.

=== Potwalloper ===
A potwalloper (sometimes potwalloner or potwaller) is an archaic term referring to a borough constituency returning members to the British House of Commons before 1832 and the Reform Act created a uniform suffrage. Several potwalloper constituencies were also represented in the Irish House of Commons, prior to its abolition in 1801. A potwalloper borough was one in which a householder had the right to vote if he had, in his house, a hearth large enough to boil, or wallop, a cauldron, or pot. The electors for Baltimore were tenants at will of the Freke family.

== History ==
In the Patriot Parliament of 1689 summoned by King James II, Baltimore was represented with two members.

== Members of Parliament, 1613–1801 ==
Baltimore, Incorporated 25 March 1613.

- 1613–1615
  - 1613 Sir Thomas Crooke, 1st Baronet
  - 1613 Henry Piers
- 1634–1635
  - 1634 Lott Peere, absent in England and replaced 1634 by James Travers
  - 1634 Edward Skipwith,
- 1639–1641
  - 1639 Bryan Jones
  - 1639 Henry Knyveton
- 1661–1666
  - 1661 Sir Nicholas Purdon
  - 1661 Richard Townsend

=== 1689–1801 ===
Election	First MP	Second MP
1689	Daniel O'Donovan	Jeremiah O'Donovan
1692	Thomas Beecher	Edward Richardson
1703	Thomas Beecher	Percy Freke
1707	Thomas Beecher	Edward Riggs
1709	Francis Langston	Edward Riggs
1713	Richard Barry	Michael Beecher
1715	William Southwell	Michael Beecher
1721	Sir Percy Freke, 2nd Bt	Michael Beecher
1727	Sir Percy Freke, 2nd Bt	Richard Tonson
1728	Sir John Freke, 3rd Bt (Note: Also elected for Cork City in 1761, for which he chose to sit)	Richard Tonson
1761	William Clements	Richard Tonson
1768	Sir John Evans-Freke, 1st Bt	Richard Tonson
1771	Sir John Evans-Freke, 1st Bt	Jocelyn Deane
1777	William Evans	Jocelyn Deane
1781	William Evans	James Chatterton
1783	Viscount Sudley	Richard Longfield
1790	Sir John Evans-Freke, 2nd Bt	Richard Grace
1798	Sir John Evans-Freke, 2nd Bt	George Evans-Freke
1801	Disenfranchised	

== Bibliography ==
- O'Hart, John (2007). The Irish and Anglo-Irish Landed Gentry: When Cromwell came to Ireland. Vol. II. Heritage Books. ISBN 978-0-7884-1927-0.
- Johnston-Liik, E. M. (2002). History of the Irish Parliament, 1692–1800, Publisher: Ulster Historical Foundation (28 February 2002), ISBN 1-903688-09-4
- T. W. Moody, F. X. Martin, F. J. Byrne, A New History of Ireland 1534-1691, Oxford University Press, 1978
- Tim Cadogan and Jeremiah Falvey, A Biographical Dictionary of Cork, 2006, Four Courts Press ISBN 1-84682-030-8
- Leigh Rayment's historical List of Members of the Irish House of Commons. Cites: Johnston-Liik, Edith Mary (2002). The History of the Irish Parliament 1692-1800 (6 volumes). Ulster Historical Foundation.
