= Sir James Chatterton, 1st Baronet =

Irish lawyer and politician

James Chatterton
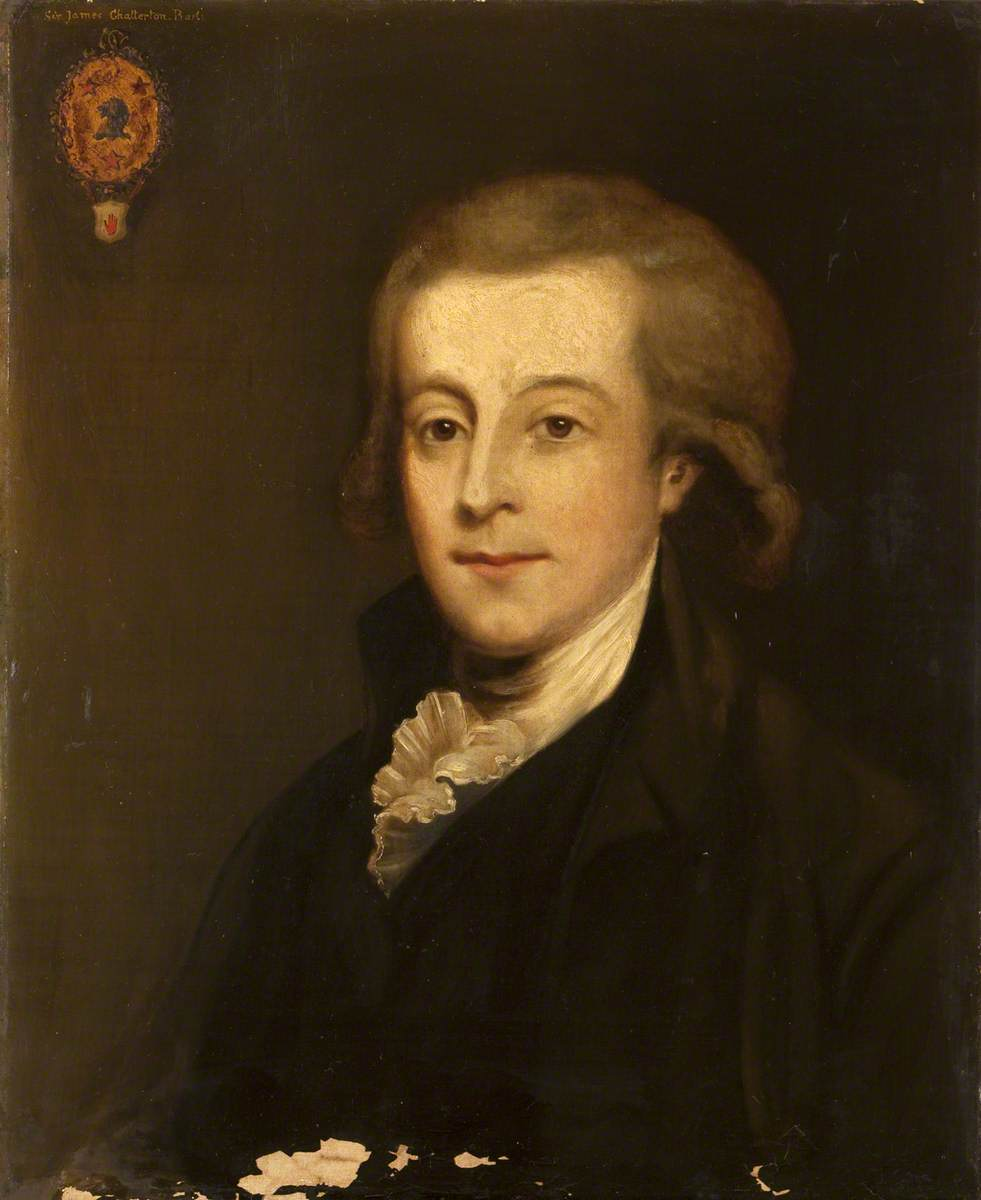

1st Baronet
- In office 1801–1806
- Succeeded by: William Abraham Chatterton

Member of the Irish Parliament for Baltimore
- In office 1781

Member of the Irish Parliament for Doneraile
- In office 1783–1797

Personal details
- Died: 9 April 1806
- Spouse: Rebecca Lane
- Children: 5, including William and James

Sir James Chatterton, 1st Baronet (died 9 April 1806), was an Irish lawyer and politician, and the first of the Chatterton Baronets of Castle Mahon.

== Life ==
He was the eldest son of Abraham Chatterton (died 1776), of Cork City, and his wife Martha Roche, daughter of Edmund Roche of Trabolgan. The Chatterton family had settled in Ireland during the reign of Elizabeth I. Thomas Chatterton, the founder of the Irish branch of the family, was granted an estate at Ardee in County Louth in 1573. The family later acquired lands in County Cork.

Chatterton entered the Middle Temple in 1770 and was called to the Bar in 1774. He sat in the Irish House of Commons, first for Baltimore in 1781, and then for Doneraile from 1783 to 1797. He was created a baronet in 1801, presumably as a reward for supporting the Act of Union 1800. He was appointed Third Irish Serjeant in 1791 and Second Serjeant in 1793; he held the latter office until his death. He was also Keeper of the State Papers in Ireland: this office was apparently a sinecure.

== Family ==
In 1790 Chatterton married Rebecca Lane (died 17 February 1838), daughter of Abraham Lane of Cork, by whom he had five children. Their first son, Sir William Abraham Chatterton (5 August 1794 – 1855), married on 3 August 1824, Henrietta-Georgiana, only child of the Reverend Lascelles Iremongor, Prebendary of Winchester. He died without issue in 1855. His widow subsequently married Edward Heneage Dering of the Coldstream Guards on 1 June 1859.

On William's death, his brother James succeeded to the baronetcy.

The three daughters of the marriage were:

- Anne, who married the Reverend Richard Dickson, of Vermont, County Limerick, and died in 1835
- Martha, who married A. E. Orpen, M. D. and died on 24 January 1857
  - Their only daughter, Rebecca-Dulcibella, was married on 18 July 1867 to Marmion-Edward Ferrers of Baddesley Clinton, Warwickshire.
- Rebecca, who in 1826 married Charles Wedderburn Webster of the 12th Royal Lancers and died on 22 June 1858

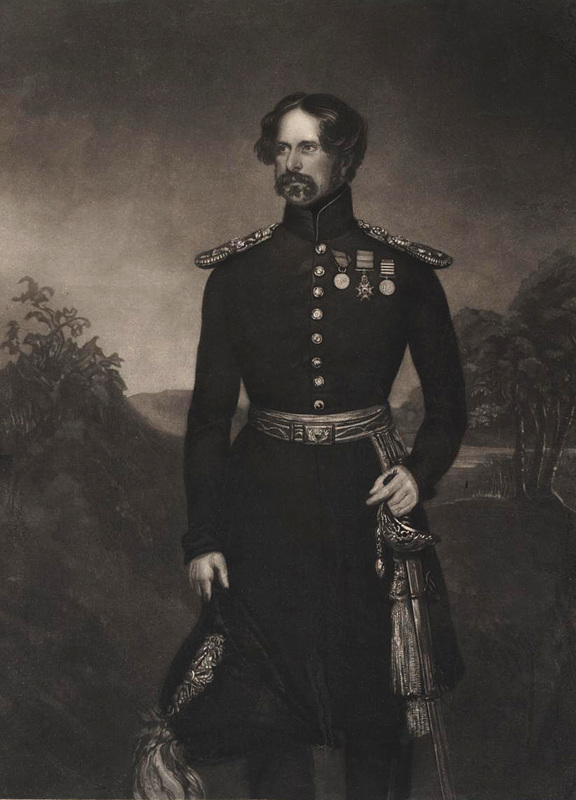
His younger son, Sir James Chatterton, 3rd Baronet

== Arms ==
Coat of arms of Sir James Chatterton, 1st Baronet
| Notes Granted 1 July 1801 by Chichester Fortescue (Ulster). Crest An antelope's head erased Argent horned Or and pierced through the neck with an arrow. Escutcheon Or a lion head erased Azure between three mullets Gules. Motto Loyal A Mort |

Baronetage of the United Kingdom
| New creation | Baronet (of Castle Mahon); 1801–1806 | Succeeded by William Chatterton |
