= John Evans-Freke, 6th Baron Carbery =

Anglo-Irish politician and peer

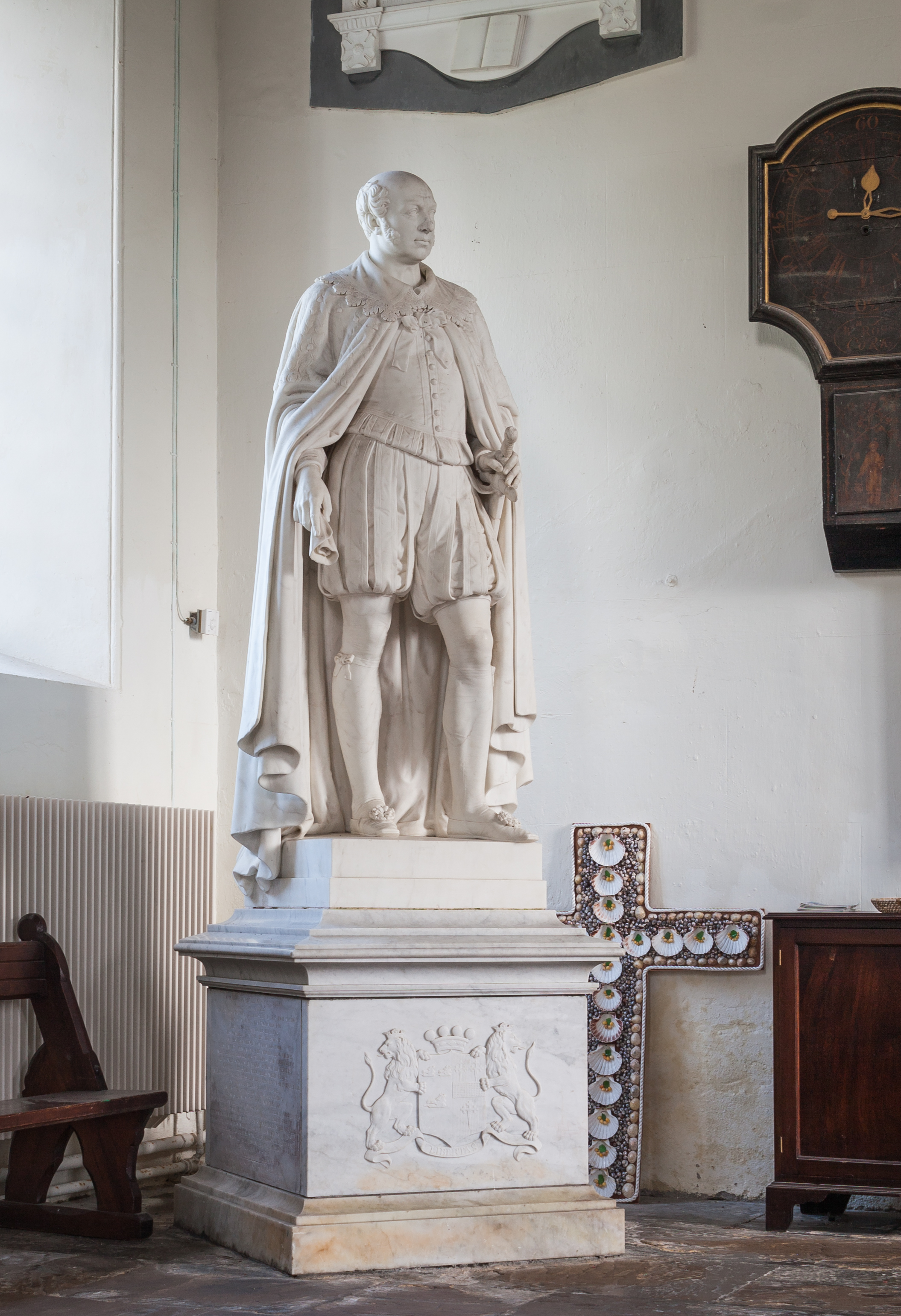
Marble statue of John Evans-Freke in St Fachtna's Cathedral, created in 1848 by Guillaume Geefs.

John Evans-Freke, 6th Baron Carbery (11 November 1765 – 12 May 1845), known as Sir John Evans-Freke, 2nd Baronet between 1777 and 1807, was an Anglo-Irish politician and peer.

He was the son of Sir John Freke, 1st Baronet. In 1777 he succeeded to his father's baronetcy. He served in the Irish House of Commons as the Member of Parliament for Donegal Borough between 1783 and 1790. He then represented Baltimore from 1790 to 1800. On 4 March 1807 he succeeded his first cousin once removed, John Evans, as Baron Carbery, and in 1824 was elected to the House of Lords as an Irish representative peer.

On 25 January 1783, he married his cousin, Lady Catherine Charlotte Gore, the third daughter of Arthur Gore, 2nd Earl of Arran. He died without surviving male issue, and was succeeded in his titles by his nephew, George Evans-Freke.

Parliament of Ireland
Preceded by Henry Hatton; Viscount Sudley	Member of Parliament for Donegal Borough; 1783 – 1790; With: Henry Hatton	Succeeded by William Downes; Humphrey Butler
Preceded by Viscount Sudley; Richard Longfield	Member of Parliament for Baltimore; 1790 – 1800; With: Richard Grace (1790-1798); George Evans-Freke (1798-1800)	Succeeded by Constituency disenfranchised
Political offices
Preceded by The Earl of Farnham	Representative peer for Ireland; 1824–1845	Succeeded by The Earl Erne
Peerage of Ireland
Preceded by John Evans	Baron Carbery; 1807–1845	Succeeded by George Evans-Freke
Baronetage of Ireland
Preceded by John Freke	Baronet (of Castle Freke); 1777–1845	Succeeded by George Evans-Freke
