= All Saints Church, Hollingbourne =

Coordinates: 51.265109°N 0.640833°E

All Saints church, Hollingbourne
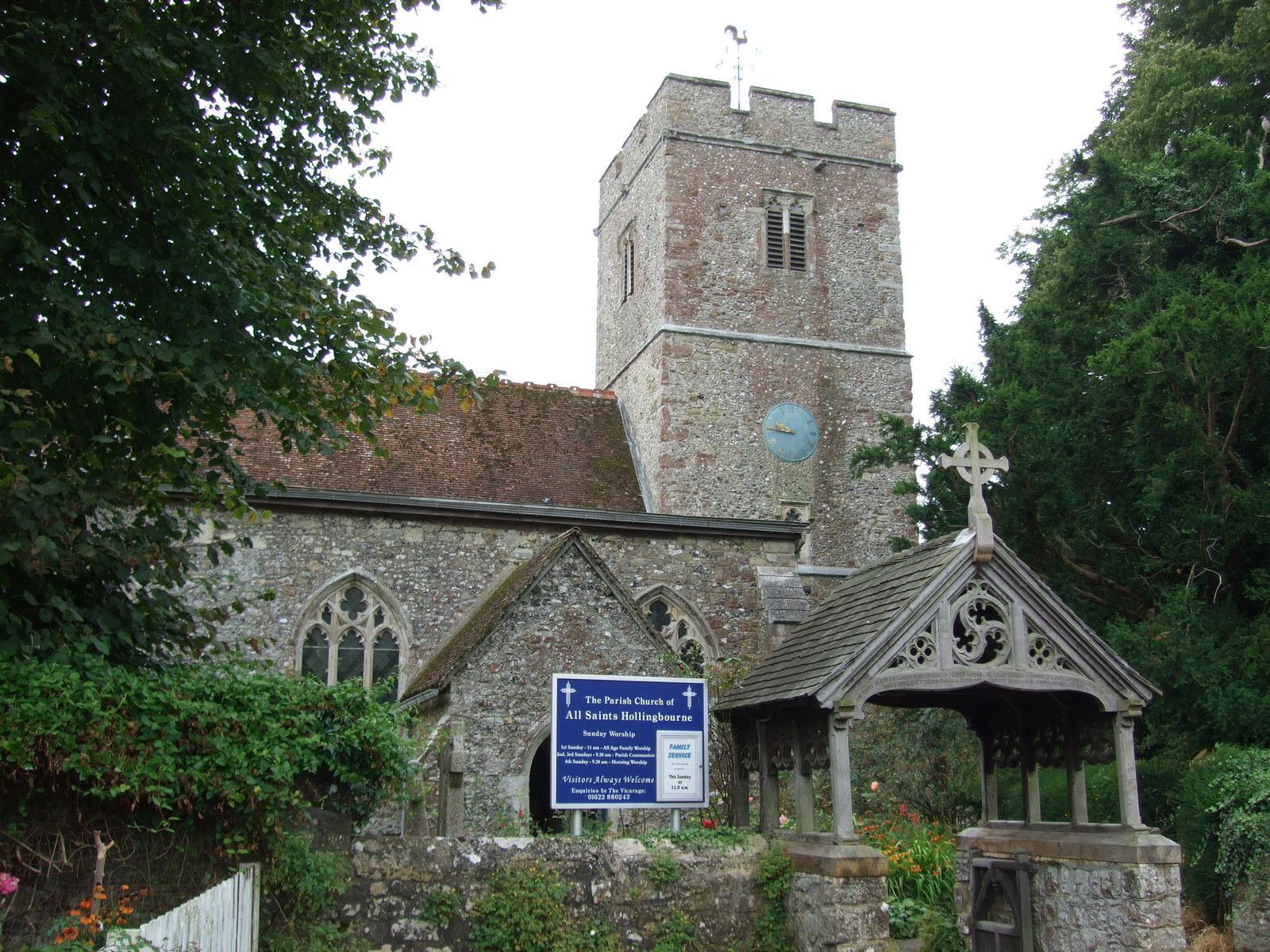

- Location within Kent
- OS grid reference: TQ 84336 55085
- Location: Hollingbourne, Kent
- Country: England
- Denomination: Anglican

History
- Status: Parish church

Architecture
- Functional status: Active
- Heritage designation: Grade I
- Designated: 26 April 1968
- Completed: 14th, 15th, 17th, 19th and 20th centuries

Administration
- Province: Canterbury
- Diocese: Canterbury
- Archdeaconry: Maidstone
- Deanery: North Downs

All Saints Church is a parish church in Hollingbourne, Kent. It was begun in the 14th century and is a Grade I listed building. The church contains numerous monuments to the local Culpeper family.

== Building ==
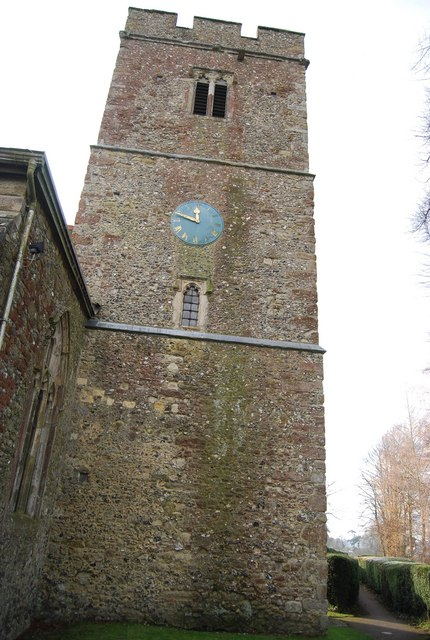
The tower is constructed in three stages.

The church was begun in the 14th century and was altered and extended in the 15th century, in 1638, 1869 and 1903. The church is constructed of flint and ashlar stone work and has plain tiled roofs. It was restored in 1876 by George Gilbert Scott, Jr. and is a Grade I listed building.

The nave is adjoined by aisles on the north and south sides and the chancel has a chapel on its north side and a vestry to its south. The west tower comprises three stages. A moulded string course with gargoyles is topped by a battlemented parapet. Single-light cinquefoil headed windows are located on the first stage above the west doorway and on each side of the second stage. The belfry windows are similar, but two-lighted.

The north aisle is late 14th century and contains three three-lighted traceried windows, the easternmost one with a trefoiled head. The attached porch is constructed of flint with a moulded stone coping, inner and outer doorways, and trefoil-headed windows to the sides. The north aisle and the porch are both buttressed. The north chapel has an ashlar stone plinth and a battlemented parapet. Its east window is three-lighted with a segmental head. The chancel is late 14th century and was probably rebuilt after the earthquake of 1382. The east end contains a three-lighted window with cinquefoil-heads and tracery. The north and south walls of the chancel each contain two-lighted windows.

The south aisle is early 14th century with a moulded stone plinth. Buttresses are positioned on the south-west corner and on the south wall. The west end wall contains a three-lighted window and three two-lighted arched and traceried windows are located between the buttress on the south wall. The vestry was built in 1903 and continues the south aisle's moulded plinth. It contains a doorway on the east side and a two-lighted window on the south side.

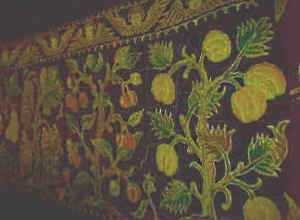
The Culpeper Needlework is embroidered with fruit and cherubs

Internally, the nave is separated from the aisles on each side with 14th-century arcades of three bays of pointed arches with octagonal columns; those to the north being later. The chapel is accessed by steps up from the north aisle and sits above a vault which partly extends under the east end of the north aisle. The nave has a crown post roof with moulded posts and chamfered tie beams. The chancel roof is of simple rafters and the roofs of the aisles are lean-tos. The font is octagonal on an octagonal stem and octagonal base. The pulpit is 17th century and hexagonal. The pews were installed by George Gilbert Scott, Jr.

The vestry contains the Culpeper needlework, a 17th-century embroidery on velvet associated with the Culpeper family, thought previously to have been an altar cloth, but now believed to be a funeral pall.

== Monuments and memorials ==
The church contains numerous monuments and memorials to the Culpeper family, owners of Leeds Castle and Hollingbourne Manor. These include Francis and Johanna Culpeper (d. 1591 and 1597), Philippa Culpeper (d. 1630), Elizabeth Culpeper (d. 1638) and the first, third and fourth Barons Colepeper: John Colpeper (d. 1660), John Colepeper (d. 1719) and Cheny Colepeper (d. 1725). Other memorials include those to Martin Barnham (d. 1610, father of Sir Francis Barnham), Dame Grace Gethin (d. 1697), Samuel Plummer (d. 1705), Baldwin Duppa (d. 1737) and Baldwin Duppa (d. 1764). The memorials for the third and fourth barons and for the two members of the Duppa family are by John Michael Rysbrack.

The churchyard contains a number of Grade II listed 17th-, 18th- and 19th-century table tombs.

== See also ==
- Grade I listed buildings in Maidstone
