= Sir James Chatterton, 3rd Baronet =

British Army general

General Sir James Chatterton GCB Bt KH
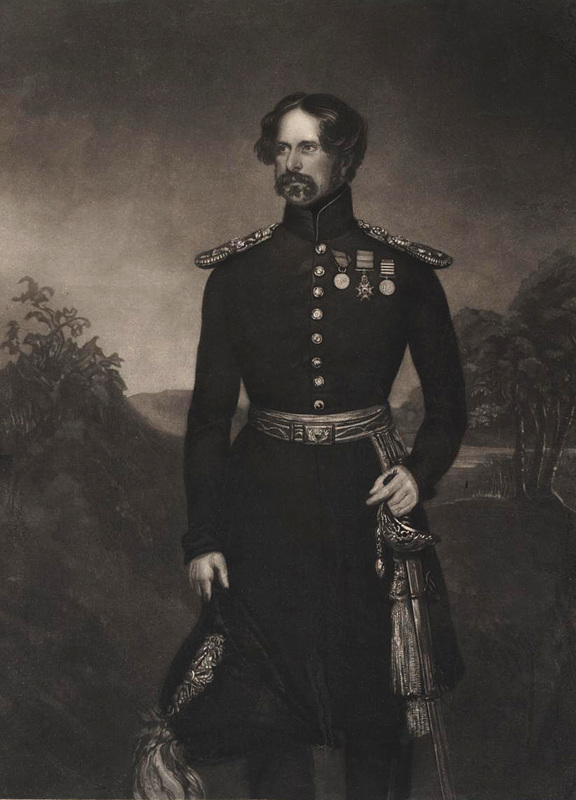
- Chatterton when colonel of the 5th Royal Irish Lancers (1858–1868)
- Born: James Charles Chatterton; 10 December 1794
- Died: 5 January 1874 (aged 79)

General Sir James Charles Chatterton, 3rd Baronet, GCB, KH (10 December 1794 – 5 January 1874) was a British Army officer and politician; he was the third and last of the Chatterton baronets of Castle Mahon. He fought during both the Peninsular and Waterloo Campaigns, later becoming Member of Parliament (MP) for Cork, Ireland.

== Life ==
The second son of Sir James Chatterton, 1st Baronet, and his wife Rebecca Lane, he joined the 12th Light Dragoons in 1809 and took part in the subsequent Peninsular War (1807–1814). He saw action at the sieges of Ciudad Rodrigo and Badajoz and the battles of Salamanca, Vittoria, Nivelle and the Nive as well as other minor actions. For his services in the Peninsular, Chatterton received the Army Gold Medal with seven clasps.

In June 1815 he fought at the battles of Quatre Bras and Waterloo then took part in the subsequent advance on and capture of Paris. After hostilities ceased he remained in France with the Army of Occupation.

At the 1838 Coronation of Queen Victoria, Chatterton commanded the 4th Dragoon Guards, and received a special gold medal. At the Duke of Wellington's funeral he carried the "Great Banner," at the Queen's request, "in consideration of his long, faithful, and distinguished services".

Chatterton sat as MP for Cork from 1831–45 and from 1849–52; he was High Sheriff from 1851-2. A 33° degree Freemason, in 1849 he was installed as Provincial Grand Master of South Munster.

In 1855 he succeeded to the Chatterton baronetcy on the death of his brother William Abraham, 2nd Baronet. He was Colonel of the 5th Royal Irish Lancers from 1858 to 1868.

== Family ==
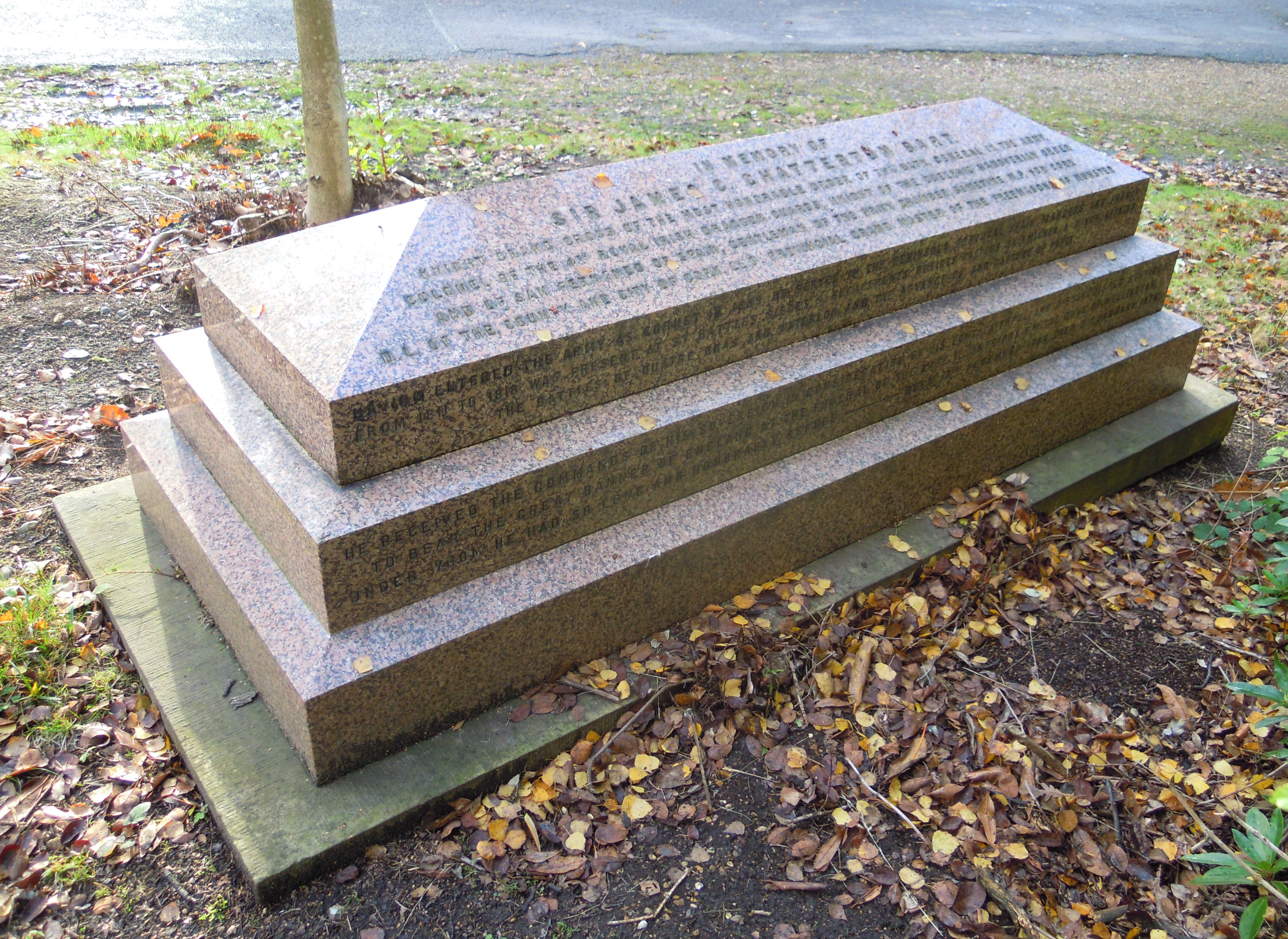
Chatterton's tomb in Brookwood Cemetery

In 1825 he married Anne, youngest daughter of James Atkinson of Lendale, Yorkshire, and had a son who died in infancy, James-William-Acheson (1826-1827). On his death the title became extinct.

He is buried with his wife in Brookwood Cemetery.

== Arms ==
Coat of arms of Sir James Chatterton, 3rd Baronet
Notes Granted 1 July 1801 by Chichester Fortescue (Ulster). Crest An antelope's head erased Argent horned Or and pierced through the neck with an arrow. Escutcheon Or a lion head erased Azure between three mullets Gules. Motto Loyal A Mort

Parliament of the United Kingdom
Preceded by Daniel Callaghan; Herbert Baldwin	Member of Parliament for Cork City; January – April 1835; With: Joseph Leycester	Succeeded by Daniel Callaghan; Herbert Baldwin
Preceded by Daniel Callaghan; William Trant Fagan	Member of Parliament for Cork City; 1849 – 1852; With: William Trant Fagan (1849–1851); Francis Murphy (1851–1852)	Succeeded by William Trant Fagan; Francis Murphy
Baronetage of the United Kingdom
Preceded by William Chatterton	Baronet (of Castle Mahon); 1855–1874	Extinct
