= George Evans, 4th Baron Carbery =

British politician

Member of Parliament for Rutland
- In office 1802–1804

Personal details
- Born: 18 February 1766
- Died: 31 December 1804 (aged 38) London, England
- Spouse: Susan Watson
- Parent: George Evans (father)
- Relatives: John Evans (uncle)
- Education: Trinity College, Cambridge

George Evans, 4th Baron Carbery (18 February 1766 – 31 December 1804) was a British peer and politician.

== Background and education ==
Carbery was the son of George Evans, 3rd Baron Carbery, and his second wife Elizabeth, daughter of Christopher Horton. He was educated at Eton from 1778 to 1781 and was admitted to Trinity College, Cambridge on 5 May 1784.

== Political career ==
Carbery succeeded his father in his (Irish) barony in 1783 and inherited a heavily encumbered estate. On 18 February 1793, he was appointed a deputy lieutenant of Northamptonshire. After the Earl of Westmorland raised a Northamptonshire volunteer cavalry regiment in 1797, Carbery was appointed its lieutenant-colonel on 20 April 1797. He was elected to the House of Commons for Rutland in 1802, a seat he held until his early death two years later.

== Personal life ==
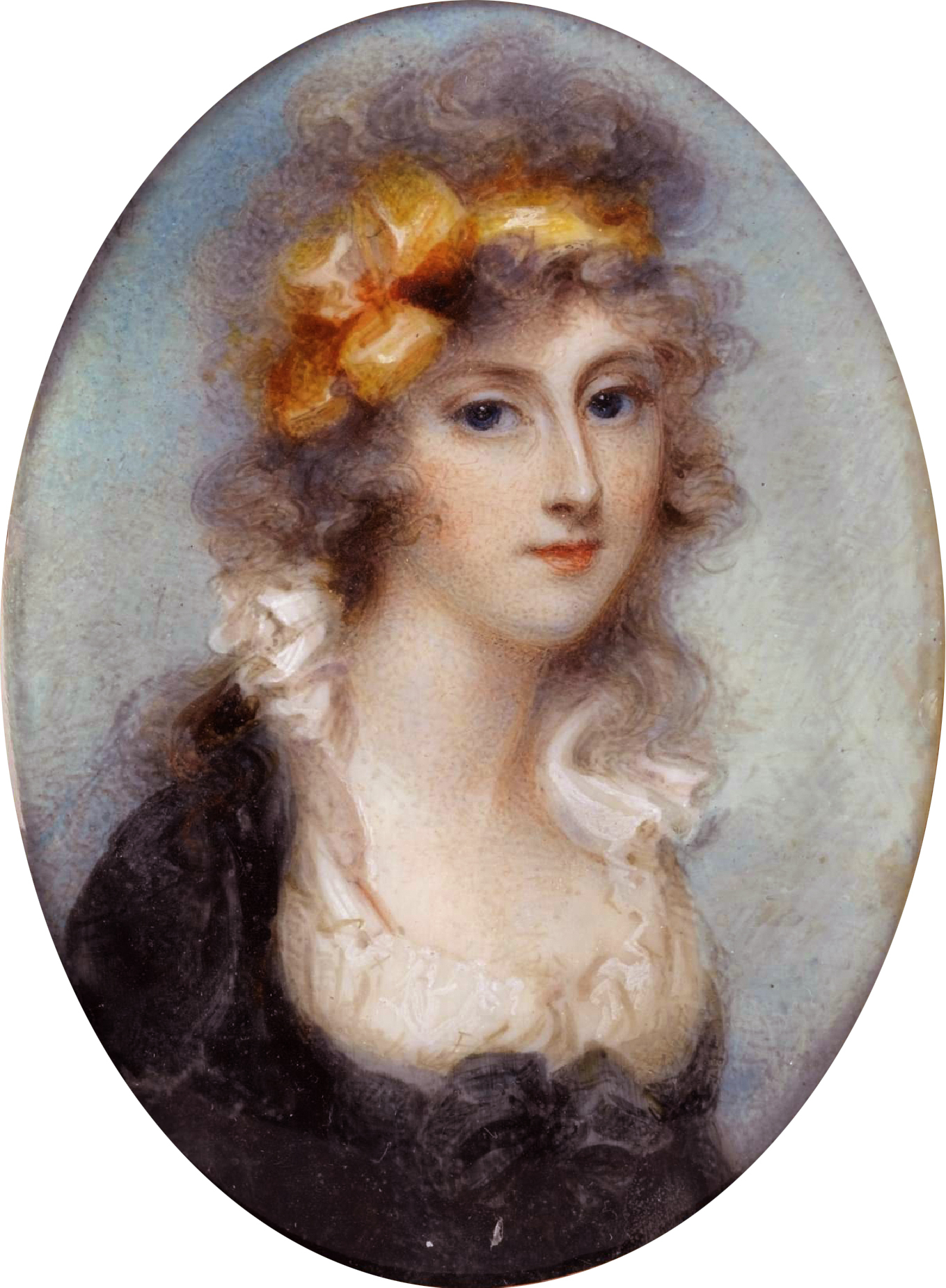
Susan, Lady Carbery (Anne Mee, 1795)

Lord Carbery married Susan, the natural daughter and heiress of Colonel Henry Watson, in 1792. Watson had left her the fortune he made as chief engineer for the East India Company. Her wealth offered the possibility of repairing his encumbered estate, but he had to agree to a marriage settlement granting her a jointure of £2,000 per year; she was not only to keep her own fortune but to receive his English estates if he died without issue by her.

They had no children.

He died in December 1804, aged 38, from the bursting of a blood vessel at Reddish's Hotel in London. He was succeeded in the barony by his uncle, John Evans. Lady Carbery later remarried and died in October 1828.

Parliament of the United Kingdom
Preceded by Gerard Noel; Sir William Lowther, Bt	Member of Parliament for Rutland; 1802–1804; With: Gerard Noel	Succeeded by Gerard Noel; The Lord Henniker
Peerage of Ireland
Preceded by George Evans	Baron Carbery; 1783–1804	Succeeded by John Evans
