= George Evans, 1st Baron Carbery =

Anglo-Irish politician and peer

George Evans, 1st Baron Carbery PC (Ire) (c. 1680 – 28 August 1749) was an Anglo-Irish politician and peer. A member of a County Limerick family of Whigs, he entered the Irish House of Commons and was created a peer in 1715 as a reward for his father's support of the Hanoverian succession, after his father declined the offer. At the same time, he was returned to the British House of Commons for Westbury. He contested control of the borough with the Tories led by the Earl of Abingdon until 1727, when he stood down.

== Early life ==
Evans was the eldest son of George Evans, of Bulgaden Hall, County Limerick and his wife Mary Eyre, a daughter of John Eyre of Eyre Court, County Galway, whom he married in 1679.

According to John Perceval, 1st Earl of Egmont (1683–1748), Evans's grandfather was a sergeant in Cromwell's army who set himself up as a cobbler in County Cork. Egmont claimed that:

… being a cunning, industrious and saving man, by buying army debentures and other opportunities that offered, laid the foundation of a large estate, which his son and grandson, the present lord, by parsimony have improved to near £6,000 a year.

The Irish Compendium says that the first George Evans was a Welsh soldier who in 1641 came to Ireland with the Cromwellian forces, in which he "had a Command", and died in 1707.

== Career in Ireland ==
On 13 April 1706, Charles Oliver, one of the members of the Irish House of Commons for County Limerick, died, and in 1707 Evans was elected to succeed him. He sat for the county as a Whig until 1714.

With the death of Queen Anne on 1 August 1714, George I succeeded her, becoming the first monarch of the House of Hanover.

On 12 November 1714, Evans was appointed governor and constable of Limerick Castle. He held this office until 1727.

Evans's father had earlier been a strong supporter of William and Mary during the Williamite War in Ireland, and in 1714 the new king offered him a peerage, which he declined. However, the peerage was accepted by his son, who on 9 May 1715 was raised to the Peerage of Ireland as Baron Carbery, of Carbery in the County of Cork, with remainder to the male issue of his father. This made him a member of the Irish House of Lords.

On 18 November 1715, Carbery was admitted to the Irish Privy Council.

== Career in Great Britain ==
By marriage, Carbery acquired the Laxton estate in Nottinghamshire, England, by marriage, and through his mother’s family he also had connexions with Wiltshire.

Shortly before his elevation to the Irish peerage, George Evans launched a new political career in Great Britain. With the sponsorship of Lord Cowper and other Whigs, Evans and Charles Allanson stood at Westbury at the 1715 British general election to challenge the Tory candidates of Lord Abingdon. The election was held on 25 January 1714/15, and conflicting returns were made: the Tory candidates, Lord Abingdon's nephew Willoughby Bertie and Francis Annesley were returned by the mayor of Westbury, while the constable of the borough returned Evans and Allanson. As the two Tories had polled 29 and 28 votes, respectively, to the 19 and 18 of Evans and Allanson, on 28 March 1714/1715 the House of Commons declared the Tories elected.

Allanson and Evans (as he still was) lodged an election petition with the House of Commons, alleging that many of the Tory voters had not possessed the right to vote at the election. There were also allegations of bribery on both sides. A Commons committee ultimately declared that Bertie and Annesley had not been duly elected and that Carbery (as he now was) and Allanson had been; on 1 June 1715, the Whig-dominated House of Commons concurred with the findings of the committee and resolved that the more narrow interpretation of the Westbury franchise was the correct one.

On 27 August 1715, the Jacobite rising of 1715 broke out in Scotland. An uprising in the West of England, planned by Tory Jacobites, was forestalled by government forces in October. Despite successes in Scotland, by the end of the year the rising had failed.

Carbery voted in favour of Whig projects such as the Septennial Act 1716 and the unsuccessful Peerage Bill in December 1719, but was not present for the vote on the Religious Worship Act 1718 in January 1718/19, which repealed the Occasional Conformity Act 1711 and Schism Act 1714.

In the 1722 election, Carbery and Thomas Bennett stood against James Bertie (brother of Lord Abingdon) and Annesley; the Tory candidates were returned by the mayor. Carbery and Bennett again petitioned against the result, alleging undue practices and that they had received a majority of the votes. Although the results of the election were in their favour, they were unable to produce the original copy of the poll, and their petition was dismissed on 25 February 1723/4. Bertie had also been returned for Middlesex and chose to sit for that constituency; in the ensuing by-election at Westbury in 1724, Carbery defeated Edward Conway and returned to Parliament. He did not stand at the 1727 election.

== Personal life ==
In 1703, George Evans married Anne, a daughter of William Stafford. She later inherited Laxton Hall from her brother. They had five children:

- Stafford Evans (b. 1704), died young
- George Evans, 2nd Baron Carbery (d. 1759)
- William Evans (died before 1756)
- John Evans (died 1758), of Bulgaden Hall, High Sheriff of County Limerick in 1734, married Grace Freke, sister and heiress of Sir Redmond Freke, 3rd Baronet, in June 1741 and had issue, including Sir John Evans-Freke, 1st Baronet
- Anne Evans, married Major Charles du Terme in 1734

Carbery's appointment as governor and constable of Limerick Castle was renewed in 1740. He died on 28 August 1749 and was succeeded by his son George. Lady Carbery died in 1757.

== Notes ==
Parliament of Ireland
Preceded by Sir Thomas Southwell; Charles Oliver	Member of Parliament for County Limerick; 1707–1714; With: Sir Thomas Southwell 1707–1713; George King 1713–1714	Succeeded by Sir Thomas Southwell, 2nd Bt; Robert Oliver
Parliament of Great Britain
Preceded by Francis Annesley; Willoughby Bertie	Member of Parliament for Westbury; 1715–1722; With: Charles Allanson	Succeeded by James Bertie; Francis Annesley
Preceded by James Bertie; Francis Annesley	Member of Parliament for Westbury; 1724–1727; With: Francis Annesley	Succeeded by Francis Annesley; John Hoskins Gifford
Peerage of Ireland
New creation	Baron Carbery; 1715–1749	Succeeded by George Evans
