= Sir Percy Freke, 2nd Baronet =

Irish politician (1700–1728)

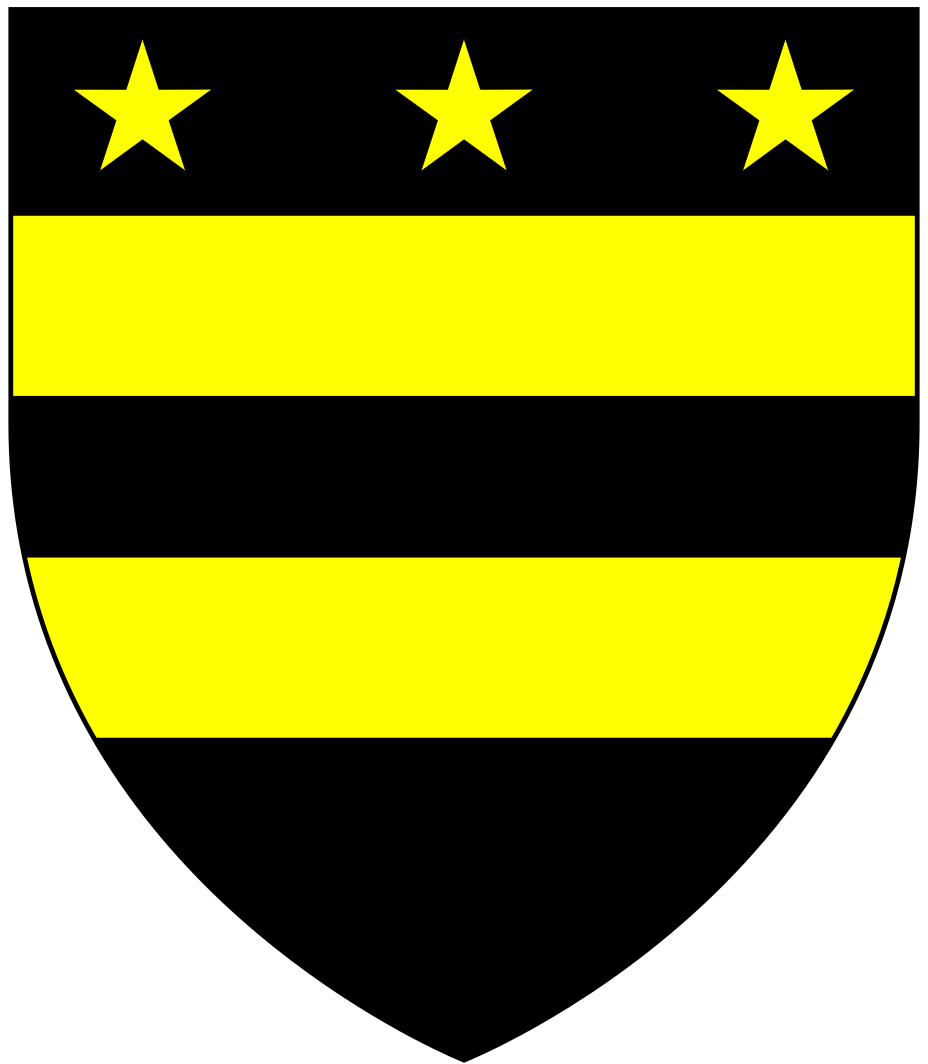
Arms of Freke: Sable, two bars or in chief three mullets of the last

Sir Percy Freke, 2nd Baronet (30 April 1700 – 10 April 1728) of West Bilney, Norfolk and Castle Freke, County Cork, was a baronet in the Baronetage of Great Britain and a Member of Parliament in the Irish House of Commons. His first name was sometimes spelt Peircy.

He was the eldest son of Sir Ralph Freke, 1st Baronet, and his wife Elizabeth, the daughter of Sir John Meade, 1st Baronet, by his second wife, Elizabeth Redman, the daughter and co-heir of Colonel Daniel Redman of Ballylinch, County Kilkenny and Abigail Otway. He succeeded to his father's baronetcy in or before 1717.

He matriculated at Christ Church, Oxford, on 27 November 1717, and received the degree of M.A. on 8 May 1721. He was Member of Parliament in the Irish House of Commons for Baltimore from 1721 until his death aged nearly 28 at Dublin on 10 April 1728. He was unmarried, and the title was inherited by his younger and only surviving brother, John Redmond Freke.

Baronetage of Great Britain
| Preceded by Ralph Freke | Baronet (of West Bilney); 1717–1728 | Succeeded by John Redmond Freke |
