= Percy Freke (politician, died 1707) =

Irish politician

Percy Freke (died May 1707) was an Irish politician. His first name is sometimes spelt Peircy.

He was the son of Arthur Freke, of Rathbarry, County Cork, and his wife Dorothy Smyth, the daughter of Mary Boyle, sister of Richard Boyle, 1st Earl of Cork, and Sir Richard Smyth of Youghal, County Cork. He purchased the estate of West Bilney in Norfolk, was High Sheriff of County Cork in 1694, and was the Member of Parliament in the Irish House of Commons for Clonakilty in 1692–93 and 1695–99, and member for Baltimore from 1703 until his death in May 1707.

He married his second cousin Elizabeth, the daughter of Ralph Freke of Hannington, Wiltshire and Cicely Culpepper, in a secret ceremony in 1672, and publicly in 1673 at St Margaret's, Westminster. Elizabeth later wrote a memoir titled "Some few remembrances of my misfortuns have attended me in my unhappy life since I were marryed."

Their only son, Ralph, named after Elizabeth's father, was born shortly after; he followed his father into politics and was created a baronet in 1713. Elizabeth died at age 69 or 73 on 7 April 1714, and was buried in Westminster Abbey, where her two sisters, Judith and Frances, were also later buried.
