= Percy Evans Freke =

Irish ornithologist and entomologist (1844–1931)

- Born: 12 July 1844; Dublin, Ireland
- Died: 20 March 1931 (aged 86); Folkestone, Kent, England
- Scientific career
- Fields: Entomology, Ornithology

Percy Evans Freke (1844–1931) was an Irish ornithologist and entomologist.

== Life ==
Freke was born in Dublin on 12 July 1844. At age 21, he enlisted in the 44th Essex Regiment. Two years later, in 1867, he exchanged to the 18th Royal Irish Regiment and after serving two years in New Zealand he retired from the army and returned to Ireland. For seven years, from 1872 to 1879, Freke operated a tobacco plantation in Amelia County, Virginia, about 30 miles southwest of Richmond. He once more returned to Ireland where he worked at the Irish land Commission. In 1899, he took up residence at Folkestone in Kent. He was, from 1883, a Corresponding Fellow of the American Ornithologists' Union.

Robert Lloyd Praeger stated that while Freke lived in Dublin, he was "belonging to Co. Carlow". His wife was Kathleen Maria Freke (1860-1944). They had at least one son, Raymond F. Freke. He died in Folkestone on 20 March 20 1931.

== Works ==
Partial list

- 1880 A comparative catalogue of birds found in Europe and North America.The Scientific proceedings of the Royal Dublin Society, Vol. II, pp. 373–416, April, p. 634, Nov., 1880
- 1883 North-American birds crossing the Atlantic.The Scientific proceedings of the Royal Dublin Society, Vol. III, pp. 22–33, 1883
- 1883 On birds observed in Amelia county, Virginia.The Scientific proceedings of the Royal Dublin Society, Vol. III, pp. 61–92 1883
- 1896 A list of Irish Hymenoptera Aculesta.The Irish naturalist: a monthly journal of general Irish natural history, Vol. V, No. 2, pp. 39–43, Feb., 1896, No. 11, p. 294, Nov., 1896
- 1897 with Cuthbert, H. K Gore Additions to the list of Irish aculeate hymenoptera, during 1897.The Irish naturalist: a monthly journal of general Irish natural history, Vol. VI, No. 12, p. 324, December 1897
- The Scientific proceedings of the Royal Dublin Society online at BHL
