= Laxton, Northamptonshire =

Village in Northamptonshire, England

Coordinates: 52.5564°N 0.5996°W

Laxton
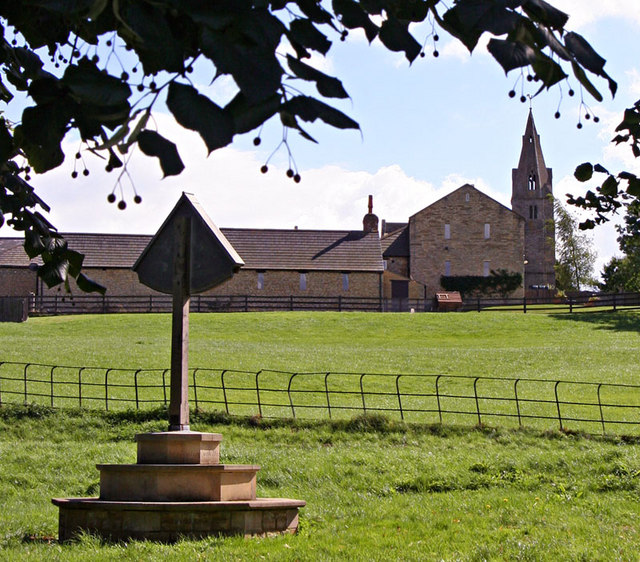

- Location within Northamptonshire
- Population: 234 (2011)
- OS grid reference: SP9596
- Unitary authority: North Northamptonshire
- Ceremonial county: Northamptonshire
- Region: East Midlands
- Country: England
- Sovereign state: United Kingdom
- Post town: Corby
- Postcode district: NN17
- Dialling code: 01780
- Police: Northamptonshire
- Fire: Northamptonshire
- Ambulance: East Midlands
- UK Parliament: Corby and East Northamptonshire

Laxton is a village in North Northamptonshire, seven miles (11 km) east of Corby and approximately one mile (1.6 km) west of the A43. At the time of the 2001 census, the parish's population was 160 people, increasing to 234 at the 2011 census.

== History ==
The villages name means 'Leaxa's farm/settlement' or 'Lax's farm/settlement'.

The village was rebuilt by George Freke Evans, as a model village to designs by Humphry Repton. The church, dedicated to All Saints, was largely rebuilt in 1867 but retains a late 13th-century tower. All Saints' Church is Grade II* listed. Lord Carbery of Laxton Hall was an amateur carver who prepared designs for the 19th-century restoration and carved the pulpit and other features.

=== 1960 Vickers Valiant crash ===
Vickers Valiant XD864 of 7 Squadron at RAF Honington, took off from RAF Wittering on 12 August 1960 at 10.30am, and crashed near the village at 10.38.

The victims were

- Flt Lt Brian Wickham aged 38, pilot
- Flt Lt Arthur Ireson aged 30, navigator, who lived at Bardwell, Suffolk, but from Bexleyheath
- Flt Lt Harry Bullen aged 39, map plotter
- Flt Lt William Howard aged 29, co-pilot, had a wife and two sons aged 4 and 2; he had been living at RAF Langtoft in south Lincolnshire
- Sgt Roy Johnson aged 27

The plane was thought to be trying to land at RAF Spanhoe. Fire vehicles arrived from Corby, and two Rutland engines from Oakham and Uppingham.

Four of the crew had their joint funeral service at Great Livermere church on 16 August 1960; the service was attended by the station commanders of Wittering (Leonard Trent), Wyton and Honington; the three officers were cremated in Ipswich, and Sgt Johnson was buried at All Saints', Honington, Suffolk; his wife, and her parents, lived at Hellesdon in Norwich.

== Laxton Hall ==
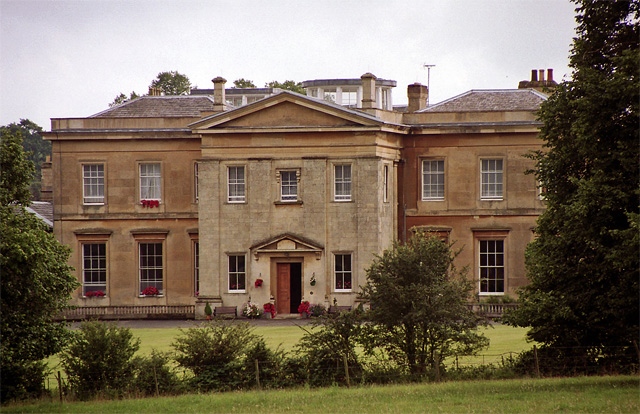
Laxton Hall

Laxton Hall is a Grade II*-listed building between Laxton and Corby. It was much modified in the 19th century and altered again in 1867-8 for the 7th Lord Carbery.

In 1924 the Dominican friars opened a boys' boarding school called Blackfriars at Laxton Hall.

The hall has now been converted into a residential care home for the Polish community while keeping the integrity of the original architecture intact.

Since the 1970s there have been Corpus Christi events where a mass usually takes place in the afternoon which is then followed by a procession. In 2009 the mass was conducted by bishop Stanislaw Budzik and the following year by monsignor Stefan Wylezek. There was no event in 2011 but resumed in 2012 on 10 June with Wylezek again presiding. On 2 June 2013 former Primate of Poland Jozef Kowalczyk visited the hall and presided over the Corpus Christi celebrations. The 2014 celebrations were conducted by Cardinal Kazimierz Nycz. Bishop Damian Zimon presided over the 2015 procession; in attendance was Marek Jurek, a former marshal of the sejm as well as a candidate for the 2010 Polish presidential election. On 3 June 2018, Stefan Wylezek again presided over the Corpus Christi celebrations. During the COVID-19 pandemic the Corpus Christi was postponed but returned on 19 June 2022 with Wylezek presiding.

== Amenities ==
Laxton Park Cricket Club plays in the Rutland and District Division 5.

Laxton Village Hall is a new building, completed in Spring 2013 thanks to funding from the Big Lottery Fund.
