= John Bance =

English rugby union player

- Full name: John Forsyth Bance
- Born: 15 January 1925 Kingsclere, Hants, England
- Died: 19 June 2009 (aged 84)
- School: Radley College
- University: Clare College, Cambridge

Rugby union career
- Position: Lock
International career
Years	Team	Apps	(Points)
1954	England	1	(0)

John Forsyth Bance (15 January 1925 – 19 June 2009) was an English international rugby union player.

Bance was born in Kingsclere, Hampshire. He attended Radley College and Clare College, Cambridge.

A lock, Bance captained Bedford and was an East Midlands representative player, featuring in their 1950–51 County Championship-winning side. He took part in his first England trials in 1951, then got his solitary call up three years later, playing in their Calcutta Cup win over Scotland Murrayfield.

Bance farmed in Cambridgeshire for the remainder of his life.

== See also ==
- List of England national rugby union players
