= Chichester Fortescue (Ulster) =

Irish admiral and member of parliament

Rear-Admiral Sir Chichester Fortescue

Ulster King of Arms
- In office 1788–1820

Member of Parliament for Trim
- In office 1798–1801

Personal details
- Born: 7 June 1750
- Died: 22 March 1820 (aged 69)
- Occupation: Naval officer and politician
- Awards: Knight bachelor

Military service
- Allegiance: Kingdom of Great Britain
- Branch/service: Royal Navy
- Years of service: c.1773–1799
- Rank: Rear-Admiral
- Commands: HMS Scourge; HMS Grana
- Battles/wars: American Revolutionary War

Sir Chichester Fortescue (7 June 1750 – 22 March 1820) was an Irish admiral and member of parliament.

The son of Chichester Fortescue by his wife Elizabeth, daughter of Richard Wesley, 1st Baron Mornington (through whom he was a first cousin of Arthur Wellesley, 1st Duke of Wellington), he represented Trim in the Irish House of Commons from 1798 to the Act of Union 1800. He also served as Ulster King of Arms, succeeding his younger brother Gerald in 1788, and was knighted on 21 February that year by the Lord Lieutenant, Lord Buckingham.

His daughter Frances married George Hamilton, as his second wife.

Heraldic offices
Preceded by Gerald Fortescue	Ulster King of Arms; 1788–1820	Succeeded by Sir William Betham
Parliament of Ireland
Preceded by Arthur Wellesley; William Arthur Crosbie	Member of Parliament for Trim; 1798–1801; With: William Arthur Crosbie	Succeeded by Constituency disenfranchised
