= Richard Tonson =

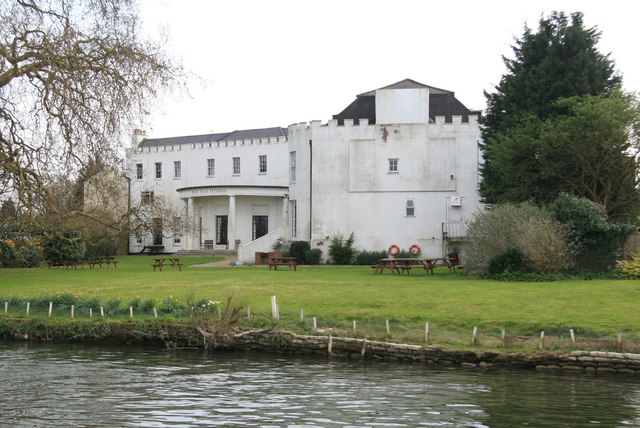
Bray Film Studios in 2007

Richard Tonson (1717–1772) was an English politician. He was Member of Parliament for Wallingford (1747–1754) and New Windsor (1768–1772).

Tonson built Bray Film Studios in the 1750s. He was a brother of bookseller and publisher Jacob Tonson.
