= Freke baronets =

Set index for Freke baronets

There have been two baronetcies created for persons with the surname Freke, one in the Baronetage of Great Britain and one in the Baronetage of Ireland.

- Freke baronets of West Bilney (1713)
- Freke, later Evans-Freke baronets, of Castle Freke (1768): see Baron Carbery
