= List of minor party and independent MPs elected in the United Kingdom =

Minor parties and independents
- House of Commons: 18 / 650

This is a list of members of the House of Commons of the United Kingdom who were elected as independents or as a member of a minor political party.

Excluded are the speaker, who traditionally stands for re-election without party affiliation, and MPs who were elected representing a major party but then defected or had the whip removed during a parliamentary term.

== Great Britain ==
There is no clear definition of 'major' or 'minor' party in Great Britain; this article takes them to include the Conservatives, Labour (including Labour Co-op), the Liberal Democrats and its forerunners, the Liberal Unionist Party, the various National Liberal parties, National Labour, the Scottish National Party and Plaid Cymru.

Minor party and independent MPs have been rare in recent times: there were only 13 people elected as such to British seats between 1950 and 2023. However, there was a surge at the general election in 2024, with 5 Reform MPs, 4 Green MPs, and 5 independent candidates elected in constituencies with large Muslim populations, where there was opposition to the Labour Party due to their stance on the Gaza war.

=== 1950–present ===
Election	Member of Parliament	Constituency	Party/Description
2026 (b)	Hannah Spencer	Gorton and Denton	Green
2025 (b)	Sarah Pochin	Runcorn and Helsby	Reform UK
2024	Siân Berry	Brighton Pavilion	Green
2024	Ellie Chowns	North Herefordshire	Green
2024	Carla Denyer	Bristol Central	Green
2024	Adrian Ramsay	Waveney Valley	Green
2024	Shockat Adam	Leicester South	Independent
2024	Jeremy Corbyn	Islington North	Independent
2024	Adnan Hussain	Blackburn	Independent
2024	Ayoub Khan	Birmingham Perry Barr	Independent
2024	Iqbal Mohamed	Dewsbury and Batley	Independent
2024	Lee Anderson	Ashfield	Reform UK
2024	Nigel Farage	Clacton	Reform UK
2024	Rupert Lowe	Great Yarmouth	Reform UK
2024	James McMurdock	South Basildon and East Thurrock	Reform UK
2024	Richard Tice	Boston and Skegness	Reform UK
2024 (b)	George Galloway	Rochdale	Workers Party of Britain
2019	Caroline Lucas	Brighton Pavilion	Green
2017	Caroline Lucas	Brighton Pavilion	Green
2015	Douglas Carswell	Clacton	UK Independence Party
2015	Caroline Lucas	Brighton Pavilion	Green
2014 (b)	Mark Reckless^{11}	Rochester and Strood	UK Independence Party
2014 (b)	Douglas Carswell^{11}	Clacton	UK Independence Party
2012 (b)	George Galloway	Bradford West	Respect Party
2010	Caroline Lucas	Brighton Pavilion	Green
2006 (b)	Dai Davies^{10}	Blaenau Gwent	Independent
2005	Richard Taylor^{7}	Wyre Forest	Independent Kidderminster Hospital and Health Concern
2005	Peter Law^{8}	Blaenau Gwent	Independent
2005	George Galloway^{9}	Bethnal Green and Bow	RESPECT The Unity Coalition
2001	Richard Taylor^{7}	Wyre Forest	Independent Kidderminster Hospital and Health Concern
1997	Martin Bell^{6}	Tatton	Independent
Feb 1974	Dick Taverne^{4}	Lincoln	Democratic Labour
Feb 1974	Eddie Milne^{5}	Blyth	Independent Labour
1973 (b)	Dick Taverne^{4}	Lincoln	Democratic Labour
1970	S. O. Davies^{3}	Merthyr Tydfil	Independent Labour
1959	David Robertson^{2}	Caithness and Sutherland	Independent Conservative
1950	Capt. John MacLeod^{1}	Ross and Cromarty	Independent Liberal

(b) = by-election

1. In 1945 and 1950, MacLeod was the nominee of the Ross and Cromarty Liberal Association, but this was not connected the Liberal Party nationally. He was a supporter of Winston Churchill and from 1951 became an official National Liberal and Conservative candidate and MP.
2. Robertson had been an official Conservative MP for the seat since 1950 but resigned the party whip in 1959 in opposition to the Government's Scottish policy and fought the election without a Conservative opponent.
3. Davies had been the Labour MP for Merthyr Tydfil since 1934 but in the run-up to the 1970 general election he was deselected by his local party on grounds of age. He stood again against the new Labour candidate and won.
4. Taverne was the sitting Labour MP for Lincoln who was increasingly at odds with his ever more left-wing local party. In 1973 he was deselected as an official Labour candidate. He resigned from Parliament and fought the ensuing by-election as a Democratic Labour candidate against the official Labour nominee, holding the seat in the February 1974 general election but losing in October 1974.
5. Milne was the sitting Labour MP for Blyth who was deselected by his local party in disputes surrounding Labour Party corruption in the North East. He stood against the official Labour nominee and won the seat, but lost in the October 1974 general election.
6. Bell, a BBC News war reporter, was nominated as a single issue candidate in opposition to the "sleaze" allegations surrounding the sitting Conservative MP for Tatton, Neil Hamilton. Both the Labour and Liberal Democrat parties withdrew their candidates in support of Bell.
7. Taylor was the nominee of Independent Kidderminster Hospital and Health Concern, a party formed around the single issue of keeping the casualty unit at Kidderminster General Hospital. In both the 2001 and 2005 general elections his candidature was not opposed by the Liberal Democrats.
8. Law was the sitting Labour Member of the Welsh Assembly for Blaenau Gwent who stood for the Westminster Parliament following a dispute over the selection of the official Labour candidate, Maggie Jones, involving an all women shortlist, a process that was opposed by many members and officials in the local party, including the retiring Labour MP Llew Smith.
9. Galloway was the Labour MP for Glasgow Hillhead from 1987 and then Glasgow Kelvin following name and boundary changes in 1997. In 2003, he was expelled from the Labour Party when a party body found that he had brought the party into disrepute over the 2003 invasion of Iraq. He helped form Respect and challenged incumbent Bethnal Green & Bow Labour MP Oona King who had supported the war.
10. Davies had been Peter Law's electoral agent in the general election.
11. Both Carswell and Reckless were elected at the 2010 general election for the Conservative party, but defected to UKIP and triggered by-elections.

=== 1919–1950 ===
Election	Member of Parliament	Constituency	Party/Description
1946 (b)	James Carmichael	Glasgow Bridgeton	Independent Labour Party
1945	Ernest Millington	Chelmsford	Common Wealth Party
1945	Willie Gallacher	West Fife	Communist Party of Great Britain
1945	Phil Piratin	Mile End	Communist Party of Great Britain
1945	William Brown	Rugby	Independent
1945	Wilson Harris	Cambridge University	Independent
1945	A. P. Herbert	Oxford University	Independent
1945	Denis Kendall	Grantham	Independent
1945	Kenneth Lindsay	Combined English Universities	Independent
1945	Ernest Graham-Little	London University	Independent
1945	John Boyd Orr	Combined Scottish Universities	Independent
1945	Eleanor Rathbone	Combined English Universities	Independent
1945	Arthur Salter	University of Oxford	Independent
1945	Daniel Lipson	Cheltenham	Independent Conservative
1945	John Mackie	Galloway	Independent Unionist
1945	Denis Pritt	Hammersmith North	Independent Labour
1945	James Maxton	Glasgow Bridgeton	Independent Labour Party
1945	Campbell Stephen	Glasgow Camlachie	Independent Labour Party
1945	John McGovern	Glasgow Shettleston	Independent Labour Party
1945	Murdo Macdonald	Inverness	Independent Liberal
1945	Capt. John MacLeod	Ross and Cromarty	Independent Liberal
1945	Vernon Bartlett	Bridgwater	Independent Progressive
1945	John Anderson	Combined Scottish Universities	National
1945	Andrew Duncan	City of London	National
1945 (b)	Ernest Millington	Chelmsford	Common Wealth Party
1945 (b)	John Boyd Orr	Combined Scottish Universities	Independent
1944 (b)	Hugh Lawson	Skipton	Common Wealth Party
1944 (b)	Charles White	West Derbyshire	Independent
1943 (b)	John Loverseed	Eddisbury	Common Wealth Party
1942 (b)	William John Brown	Rugby	Independent
1942 (b)	Tom Driberg	Maldon	Independent
1942 (b)	Denis Kendall	Grantham	Independent
1942 (b)	James Grigg	Cardiff East	National
1942 (b)	George Reakes	Wallasey	Independent
1940 (b)	Andrew Duncan	City of London	National
1940 (b)	Cuthbert Headlam	Newcastle North	Independent Conservative
1940 (b)	John Reith	Southampton	National
1940 (b)	Archibald Hill	Cambridge University	Independent Conservative
1938 (b)	Vernon Bartlett	Bridgwater	Independent Progressive
1938 (b)	John Anderson	Combined Scottish Universities	National
1937 (b)	Arthur Salter	Oxford University	Independent
1937 (b)	Daniel Lipson	Cheltenham	Independent Conservative
1937 (b)	Edmund Harvey	Combined English Universities	Independent Progressive
1935	Willie Gallacher	West Fife	Communist Party of Great Britain
1935	A. P. Herbert	University of Oxford	Independent
1935	Eleanor Rathbone	Combined English Universities	Independent
1935	George Buchanan	Glasgow Gorbals	Independent Labour Party
1935	James Maxton	Glasgow Bridgeton	Independent Labour Party
1935	John McGovern	Glasgow Shettleston	Independent Labour Party
1935	Campbell Stephen	Glasgow Camlachie	Independent Labour Party
1935	Austin Hopkinson	Mossley	National Independent
1935	Sir Ernest Graham-Little	London University	National Independent
1935	Ivor Guest	Breconshire and Radnorshire	National Independent
1931	Eleanor Rathbone	Combined English Universities	Independent
1931	Josiah Wedgwood ¹	Newcastle-under-Lyme	Independent Labour
1931	George Buchanan ¹	Glasgow Gorbals	Independent Labour Party
1931	David Kirkwood ¹	Dumbarton Burghs	Independent Labour Party
1931	James Maxton ¹	Glasgow Bridgeton	Independent Labour Party
1931	John McGovern ¹	Glasgow Shettleston	Independent Labour Party
1931	Richard Wallhead ¹	Merthyr Tydfil	Independent Labour Party
1931	David Lloyd George	Caernarvon	Independent Liberal
1931	Gwilym Lloyd George	Pembrokeshire	Independent Liberal
1931	Megan Lloyd George	Anglesey	Independent Liberal
1931	Goronwy Owen	Caernarvonshire	Independent Liberal
1931	Gordon Campbell	Burnley	National
1931	Ian Horobin	Southwark Central	National
1931	Joseph Leckie	Walsall	National
1931	Austin Hopkinson	Mossley	National Independent
1931	Ernest Graham-Little	London University	National Independent
1930 (b)	Ernest Taylor	Paddington South	Empire Free Trade Crusade
1929	Ernest Graham-Little	London University	Independent
1929	Robert Newman	Exeter	Independent
1929	Eleanor Rathbone	Combined English Universities	Independent
1929	Thomas Robinson	Stretford	Independent
1929	Neil Maclean ²	Glasgow Govan	Independent Labour
1929	T. P. O'Connor	Liverpool Scotland	Nationalist Party (Ireland)
1929	Edwin Scrymgeour	Dundee	Scottish Prohibition Party
1924	Shapurji Saklatvala	Battersea North	Communist Party of Great Britain
1924	Winston Churchill	Epping	Constitutionalist
1924	Hugh Edwards	Accrington	Constitutionalist
1924	Abraham England	Heywood and Radcliffe	Constitutionalist
1924	Hamar Greenwood	Walthamstow East	Constitutionalist
1924	Algernon Moreing	Camborne	Constitutionalist
1924	Thomas Robinson	Stretford	Constitutionalist
1924	John Ward	Stoke	Constitutionalist
1924	Austin Hopkinson	Mossley	Independent
1924	Ernest Graham-Little	London University	Independent
1924	T. P. O'Connor	Liverpool Scotland	Nationalist Party (Ireland)
1924	Edwin Scrymgeour	Dundee	Scottish Prohibition Party
1923	George M. L. Davies	University of Wales	Christian Pacifist
1923	Austin Hopkinson	Mossley	Independent
1923	Leif Jones	Camborne	Independent Liberal
1923	Oswald Mosley	Harrow	Independent
1923	Rhys Hopkin Morris	Cardiganshire	Independent Liberal
1923	Thomas Power O'Connor	Liverpool Scotland	Nationalist Party (Ireland)
1923	Edwin Scrymgeour	Dundee	Scottish Prohibition Party
1922	Walton Newbold	Motherwell	Communist Party of Great Britain
1922	George Jarrett	Dartford	Constitutionalist
1922	Austin Hopkinson	Mossley	Independent
1922	Oswald Mosley	Harrow	Independent
1922	George Henry Roberts	Norwich	Independent
1922	Harry Becker	Richmond	Independent Conservative
1922	James Malcolm Monteith Erskine	Westminster St George's	Independent Conservative
1922	Gordon Hall Caine	East Dorset	Independent Conservative
1922	Owen Thomas	Anglesey	Independent Labour
1922	J. R. M. Butler	Cambridge University	Independent Liberal
1922	T. P. O'Connor	Liverpool Scotland	Nationalist Party (Ireland)
1922	Edwin Scrymgeour	Dundee	Scottish Prohibition Party
1921 (b)	Murray Sueter	Hertford	Anti-Waste League and Independent
1921 (b)	James Malcolm Monteith Erskine	Westminster St George's	Independent Anti-Waste
1921 (b)	Thomas Andrew Polson	Dover	Independent
1920 (b)	Charles Vere Ferrers Townshend	The Wrekin	Independent
1920 (b)	Charles Palmer	The Wrekin	Independent

(b) = by-election

1. Stood as a "Labour Party" candidate, but without the backing of the Labour Party and did not take the Labour whip.
2. Due to an oversight, Maclean's candidature was not endorsed by the Labour Party. Once elected, he immediately took the Labour whip.

=== 1832–1918 ===
Excluded during this period are MPs from the Conservative and Liberal Parties, the Labour Party but not the Labour Representation Committee, the Liberal Unionist Party, the Whigs and the Tories. Before 1885 it becomes increasingly difficult to identify which MPs were independent, and F. W. S. Craig's classification is used.

Election	Member of Parliament	Constituency	Party/Description
1918	Douglas King	North Norfolk	Coalition Independent
1918	Alfred Waterson	Kettering	Co-operative Party
1918	Horatio Bottomley	Hackney South	Independent
1918	Noel Pemberton-Billing	Hertford	Independent
1918	Frank Herbert Rose	Aberdeen North	Independent Labour
1918	Owen Thomas	Anglesey	Independent Labour
1918	Josiah Wedgwood	Newcastle-under-Lyme	Independent Liberal
1918	Robert Hewitt Barker	Sowerby	Independent Conservative/NADSS
1918	George Barnes	Glasgow Gorbals	Coalition National Democratic Party
1918	Clement Edwards	East Ham South	Coalition National Democratic Party
1918	Joseph Frederick Green	Leicester West	Coalition National Democratic Party
1918	Eldred Hallas	Birmingham Duddeston	Coalition National Democratic Party
1918	Charles Jesson	Walthamstow West	Coalition National Democratic Party
1918	Charles Edgar Loseby	Bradford East	Coalition National Democratic Party
1918	Matthew Turnbull Simm	Wallsend	Coalition National Democratic Party
1918	James Seddon	Hanley	Coalition National Democratic Party
1918	James Walton	Don Valley	Coalition National Democratic Party
1918	T. P. O'Connor	Liverpool Scotland	Nationalist Party (Ireland)
1918	Richard Cooper	Walsall	National Party
1918	Henry Page Croft	Bournemouth	National Party
1918	Jack Jones	Silvertown	National Socialist Party
1917 (b)	Benjamin Tillett	Salford North	Independent Labour
1916 (b)	Noel Pemberton Billing	Hertford	Independent
1915 (b)	Charles Stanton	Merthyr Tydfil	Independent Labour
1913 (b)	John Weston	Kendal	Independent Conservative
Dec 1910	Francis Bennett-Goldney	Canterbury	Independent Conservative
Dec 1910	T. P. O'Connor	Liverpool Scotland	Nationalist Party (Ireland)
Jan 1910	Archibald Corbett	Glasgow Tradeston	Independent Liberal
Jan 1910	Samuel Storey	Sunderland	Independent Conservative
Jan 1910	T. P. O'Connor	Liverpool Scotland	Nationalist Party (Ireland)
1907 (b)	Victor Grayson	Colne Valley	Colne Valley Labour League
1906
1906	Arthur Henderson	Barnard Castle	Labour Representation Committee
1906	Charles Duncan	Barrow-in-Furness	Labour Representation Committee
1906	Philip Snowden	Blackburn	Labour Representation Committee
1906	Alfred Henry Gill	Bolton	Labour Representation Committee
1906	Fred Jowett	Bradford West	Labour Representation Committee
1906	John Jenkins	Chatham	Labour Representation Committee
1906	John Wilkinson Taylor	Chester-le-Street	Independent Labour
1906	David Shackleton	Clitheroe	Labour Representation Committee
1906	C. W. Bowerman	Deptford	Labour Representation Committee
1906	Alexander Wilkie	Dundee	Labour Representation Committee
1906	George Nicoll Barnes	Glasgow Blackfriars and Hutchesontown	Labour Representation Committee
1906	John Hodge	Gorton	Labour Representation Committee
1906	John Williams	Gower	Independent Liberal-Labour
1906	James Parker	Halifax	Labour Representation Committee
1906	Stephen Walsh	Ince	Labour Representation Committee
1906	James O'Grady	Leeds East	Labour Representation Committee
1906	Ramsay MacDonald	Leicester	Labour Representation Committee
1906	T. P. O'Connor	Liverpool Scotland	Nationalist Party (Ireland)
1906	J. R. Clynes	Manchester North East	Labour Representation Committee
1906	George Davy Kelley	Manchester South West	Labour Representation Committee
1906	Keir Hardie	Merthyr Tydfil	Labour Representation Committee
1906	Walter Hudson	Newcastle-upon-Tyne	Labour Representation Committee
1906	James Seddon	Newton	Labour Representation Committee
1906	George Henry Roberts	Norwich	Labour Representation Committee
1906	John Thomas Macpherson	Preston	Labour Representation Committee
1906	George Wardle	Stockport	Labour Representation Committee
1906	Thomas Summerbell	Sunderland	Labour Representation Committee
1906	Will Thorne	West Ham South	Labour Representation Committee
1906	William Wilson	Westhoughton	Labour Representation Committee
1906	Thomas Frederick Richards	Wolverhampton West	Labour Representation Committee
1906	Will Crooks	Woolwich	Labour Representation Committee
1904 (b)	J. E. B. Seely	Isle of Wight	Independent Conservative
1903 (b)	Arthur Henderson	Barnard Castle	Labour Representation Committee
1903 (b)	Will Crooks	Woolwich	Labour Representation Committee
1902 (b)	David Shackleton	Clitheroe	Labour Representation Committee
1902 (b)	Cathcart Wason	Orkney and Shetland	Independent Liberal
1900	John Austin	Osgoldcross	Independent Liberal
1900	Keir Hardie	Merthyr Tydfil	Labour Representation Committee
1900	Richard Bell	Derby	Labour Representation Committee
1900	T. P. O'Connor	Liverpool Scotland	Nationalist Party (Ireland)
1899 (b)	John Austin	Osgoldcross	Independent Liberal
1895	T. P. O'Connor	Liverpool Scotland	Nationalist Party (Ireland)
1894 (b)	John Macleod	Sutherland	Liberal/Crofter
1892	John Burns	Battersea	Independent Labour
1892	Keir Hardie	West Ham South	Independent Labour
1892	Havelock Wilson	Middlesbrough	Independent Labour
1892	Edward Watkin	Hythe	Independent Liberal
1892	T. P. O'Connor	Liverpool Scotland	Nationalist Party (Ireland)
1888 (b)	William Pritchard Morgan	Merthyr Tydfil	Independent Liberal
1886	T. P. O'Connor	Liverpool Scotland	Nationalist Party (Ireland)
1885	Robert Anstruther	St Andrews Burghs	Independent Liberal
1885	John Macdonald Cameron	Wick Burghs	Independent Liberal
1885	George Campbell	Kirkcaldy Burghs	Independent Liberal
1885	Charles Conybeare	Camborne	Independent Liberal/Radical
1885	Joseph Cowen	Newcastle-upon-Tyne	Independent Liberal
1885	John Wentworth-Fitzwilliam	Peterborough	Independent Liberal
1885	George Goschen	Edinburgh East	Independent Liberal
1885	George Harrison	Edinburgh South	Independent Liberal
1885	Charles Stuart Parker	Perth	Independent Liberal
1885	Edward William Watkin	Hythe	Independent Liberal
1885	John Wilson	Edinburgh Central	Independent Liberal
1885	Gavin Brown Clark	Caithness	Independent Liberal/Crofter
1885	Charles Fraser-Mackintosh	Inverness-shire	Independent Liberal/Crofter
1885	Roderick MacDonald	Ross and Cromarty	Independent Liberal/Crofter
1885	Donald Horne Macfarlane	Argyllshire	Independent Liberal/Crofter
1885	William Abraham	Rhondda	Independent Lib-Lab
1885	T. P. O'Connor	Liverpool Scotland	Nationalist Party (Ireland)
1880	John Wentworth-Fitzwilliam	Peterborough	Independent Liberal
1878 (b)	John Wentworth-Fitzwilliam	Peterborough	Independent Liberal
1875 (b)	Edward Kenealy	Stoke	Independent
1874	Charles Fraser-Mackintosh	Inverness Burghs	Independent Liberal
1874	John Arthur Roebuck	Sheffield	Independent Liberal
1869 (b)	John Sinclair	Caithness	Independent Liberal
1868	Henry Butler-Johnstone	Cambridge	Independent Conservative
1868	Robert Juckes Clifton	Nottingham	Independent Liberal
1866 (b)	Ralph Bernal Osborne	Nottingham	Independent Liberal
1865	Robert Juckes Clifton	Nottingham	Independent Liberal
1865	Samuel Gurney	Penryn and Falmouth	Independent Liberal
1865	John Arthur Roebuck	Sheffield	Independent Liberal
1861 (b)	Robert Juckes Clifton	Nottingham	Independent Liberal
1859	Charles Eurwicke Douglas	Banbury	Independent Liberal
1859	Samuel Gurney	Penryn and Falmouth	Independent Liberal
1859	John Arthur Roebuck	Sheffield	Independent Liberal
1857	Edward Glover	Beverley	Independent Conservative
1857	Samuel Gurney	Penryn and Falmouth	Independent Whig
1857	William Hackblock	Reigate	Independent Whig
1857	William McCullagh	Great Yarmouth	Independent Whig
1857	John Arthur Roebuck	Sheffield	Independent Whig
1857	Dudley Ryder	Lichfield	Independent Whig
1857	Henry Brinsley Sheridan	Dudley	Independent
1857	William Pole Thornhill	North Derbyshire	Independent Whig
1857	George Drought Warburton	Harwich	Independent Whig
1857 (b)	Edward Ryley Langworthy	Salford	Independent Whig
1856 (b)	Dudley Ryder	Lichfield	Independent Whig
1853 (b)	William Pole Thornhill	North Derbyshire	Independent Whig
1852	John Arthur Roebuck	Sheffield	Independent Whig
1849 (b)	John Arthur Roebuck	Sheffield	Independent Whig
1847	Feargus O'Connor	Nottingham	Chartist

== Northern Ireland ==
MPs from the Democratic Unionist Party, Sinn Féin, Social Democratic and Labour Party or Ulster Unionist Party, including those Ulster Unionists who stood as part of the Conservative Party, are excluded. While these four are all currently regarded as major parties, each of these parties has at times held only a single seat (or none, in the cases of Sinn Féin, the SDLP, and the UUP), and for many years Sinn Féin was a banned organisation and did not contest elections. Also excluded are MPs from the Nationalist Party, which dissolved in 1977 but was formerly considered a major party.

Election	Member of Parliament	Constituency	Party/Description
2024	Jim Allister	North Antrim	Traditional Unionist Voice
2024	Sorcha Eastwood	Lagan Valley	Alliance
2024	Alex Easton	North Down	Independent
2019	Stephen Farry	North Down	Alliance
2017	Sylvia Hermon^{1}	North Down	Independent
2015	Sylvia Hermon^{1}	North Down	Independent
2010	Naomi Long	Belfast East	Alliance
2010	Sylvia Hermon^{1}	North Down	Independent
1997	Robert McCartney	North Down	UK Unionist Party
1995 (b)	Robert McCartney	North Down	UK Unionist Party
1992	James Kilfedder^{2}	North Down	Ulster Popular Unionist Party
1987	James Kilfedder^{2}	North Down	Ulster Popular Unionist Party
1986 (b)	James Kilfedder^{2}	North Down	Ulster Popular Unionist Party
1983	James Kilfedder^{2}	North Down	Ulster Popular Unionist Party
1981 (b)	Owen Carron^{3}	Fermanagh and South Tyrone	Anti H-Block
1981 (b)	Bobby Sands^{4}	Fermanagh and South Tyrone	Anti H-Block
1979	Frank Maguire^{5}	Fermanagh and South Tyrone	Independent Republican
1979	James Kilfedder^{2}	North Down	Independent Ulster Unionist
1979	John Dunlop^{5}	Mid Ulster	United Ulster Unionist Party
Oct 1974	Frank Maguire^{5}	Fermanagh and South Tyrone	Independent Republican
Oct 1974	Robert Bradford^{7}	Belfast South	Vanguard Progressive Unionist Party
Oct 1974	William Craig^{7}	Belfast East	Vanguard Progressive Unionist Party
Oct 1974	John Dunlop^{6}	Mid Ulster	Vanguard Progressive Unionist Party
Feb 1974	Robert Bradford^{7}	Belfast South	Vanguard Progressive Unionist Party
Feb 1974	William Craig^{7}	Belfast East	Vanguard Progressive Unionist Party
Feb 1974	John Dunlop^{6}	Mid Ulster	Vanguard Progressive Unionist Party
1970	Ian Paisley^{8}	North Antrim	Protestant Unionist Party
1970	Gerry Fitt^{9}	Belfast West	Republican Labour Party
1970	Bernadette Devlin	Mid Ulster	Unity
1970	Frank McManus	Fermanagh and South Tyrone	Unity
1969 (b)	Bernadette Devlin	Mid Ulster	Opposition Unity
1966	Gerry Fitt^{9}	Belfast West	Republican Labour Party
1956 (b)	George Forrest	Mid Ulster	Independent Unionist
1951	Michael O'Neill	Mid Ulster	Independent Nationalist
1951	Jack Beattie	Belfast West	Irish Labour Party
1945	Jack Beattie	Belfast West	Independent Labour
1945	James Little^{10}	Down	Independent Unionist
1943 (b)	Jack Beattie	Belfast West	Northern Ireland Labour Party
1919 (b)	George Hanna	East Antrim	Independent Unionist

(b) = by-election

1. Hermon was an Ulster Unionist MP for North Down from 2001 to 2010 when she left the party in opposition to the party's electoral pact with the NI Conservatives to form UCU-NF. She retained her seat at the 2010 general election, and at the next two general elections.
2. Kilfedder was an Ulster Unionist MP for Belfast West 1964-1966 and for North Down until 1977 when he left the party in opposition to Enoch Powell's proposals for integration over devolution. Kilfedder sat as an Independent Unionist until 1980, then formed the Ulster Popular Unionist Party which primarily served as a vehicle for him and his supporters.
3. Carron was elected on the issue of the 1981 Irish Hunger Strike, standing as an "Anti H-Block/Proxy Political Prisoner" after new laws banned the nomination of any of the hunger strikers. He did not take his seat in the House of Commons. From 1982 onwards he was standing as a Sinn Féin in elections, including his unsuccessful defence of this seat in the 1983 general election.
4. Sands was the most prominent of the Irish Hunger Strikers and incarcerated at HM Prison Maze at the time of his election, though he was ideologically opposed to taking his seat in the Commons.
5. Maguire was the product of an electoral pact amongst Irish Nationalists. Although in the tradition of the prior Unity pact, he did not use the label (though is sometimes listed as a Unity MP). He did take his seat in the House of Commons, though only attended rarely.
6. Dunlop was the Vanguard Progressive Unionist Party MP for Mid Ulster from February 1974, until the party split over leader William Craig's proposals for power-sharing with the Social Democratic and Labour Party in 1976. One faction, to which Dunlop belonged, formed the United Ulster Unionist Party, under which banner he stood and sat for the constituency until standing down at the 1983 election.
7. Craig and Bradford were the Vanguard Progressive Unionist Party MPs for Belfast East & Belfast South respectively from February 1974 and stayed in Vanguard following the 1976 party split, then merging the party into the Ulster Unionists in February 1978.
8. In 1971 Paisley merged the Protestant Unionist Party into the new Democratic Unionist Party.
9. Fitt was elected as a Republican Labour Party in 1966 and 1970, but later in the latter year he left the party and co-founded the Social Democratic and Labour Party, for which he sat as an MP until 1980, when he left that party and sat in the Commons as an Independent Socialist until his defeat in 1983.
10. Little was elected as an official Ulster Unionist in the 1939 Down by-election. Prior to the 1945 general election he resigned from the party in protest at being subject to a reselection due to the retirement of Viscount Castlereagh, the other official Unionist MP, and held his seat as an Independent Ulster Unionist. He died in 1946.

== Ireland ==
All MPs are listed except those from the Irish Unionist Alliance (affiliated to the Conservative Party during this period), the Nationalist Party, Sinn Féin, the Liberal Party, the Liberal Unionist Party and the Home Rule candidates.

Election	Member of Parliament	Constituency	Party/Description
1918	Robert Henry Woods	Dublin University	Independent Unionist
1918	Thomas Henry Burn	Belfast St Anne's	Labour Unionist
1918	Samuel McGuffin	Belfast Shankill	Labour Unionist
1918	Thompson Donald	Belfast Victoria	Labour Unionist
1914 (b)	Edward John Graham	King's County Tullamore	Independent Nationalist
1914 (b)	William O'Brien	Cork City	All-for-Ireland League
1913 (b)	John Guiney	North Cork	All-for-Ireland League
1911 (b)	Tim Healy	North East Cork	All-for-Ireland League
Dec 1910	William O'Brien	Cork City	All-for-Ireland League
Dec 1910	Maurice Healy	Cork City	All-for-Ireland League
Dec 1910	D. D. Sheehan	Mid Cork	All-for-Ireland League
Dec 1910	Patrick Guiney	North Cork	All-for-Ireland League
Dec 1910	Moreton Frewen	North East Cork	All-for-Ireland League
Dec 1910	John Walsh	South Cork	All-for-Ireland League
Dec 1910	Eugene Crean	South East Cork	All-for-Ireland League
Dec 1910	James Gilhooly	West Cork	All-for-Ireland League
Dec 1910	John McKean	South Monaghan	Independent Nationalist
Dec 1910	Laurence Ginnell	North Westmeath	Independent Nationalist
1910 (b)	Maurice Healy	North East Cork	All-for-Ireland League
Jan 1910	William O'Brien	Cork City	All-for-Ireland League
Jan 1910	D. D. Sheehan	Mid Cork	All-for-Ireland League
Jan 1910	Patrick Guiney	North Cork	All-for-Ireland League
Jan 1910	William O'Brien	North East Cork	All-for-Ireland League
Jan 1910	Eugene Crean	South East Cork	All-for-Ireland League
Jan 1910	James Gilhooly	West Cork	All-for-Ireland League
Jan 1910	Timothy Michael Healy	North Louth	All-for-Ireland League
Jan 1910	John O'Donnell	South Mayo	All-for-Ireland League
Jan 1910	Eugene O'Sullivan	East Kerry	Independent Nationalist
Jan 1910	John McKean	South Monaghan	Independent Nationalist
Jan 1910	Laurence Ginnell	North Westmeath	Independent Nationalist
1909 (b)	Maurice Healy	Cork City	Independent Nationalist
1906 (b)	D. D. Sheehan	Mid Cork	Independent Labour
1906	Timothy Michael Healy	North Louth	Independent Nationalist
1906	Thomas Sloan	Belfast South	Independent Unionist
1903 (b)	Edward Mitchell	North Fermanagh	Independent
1902 (b)	Thomas Henry Sloan	Belfast South	Independent Unionist
1902 (b)	James Wood	Down East	Independent
1900	John Campbell	South Armagh	Independent Nationalist
1900	John Hammond	County Carlow	Independent Nationalist
1900	Timothy Michael Healy	North Louth	Independent Nationalist
1900	Joseph Nolan	South Louth	Independent Nationalist
1900	James Laurence Carew	South Meath	Independent Nationalist
1900	Patrick James Kennedy	North Westmeath	Independent Nationalist
1885	Edward de Cobain	Belfast East	Independent Conservative
1885	William Johnston	Belfast South	Independent Conservative
1875 (b)	John Mitchel	Tipperary	Independent Nationalist
1875 (b)	John Mitchel	Tipperary	Independent Nationalist
1871 (b)	John Martin	Meath	Independent Nationalist
1869 (b)	Jeremiah O'Donovan Rossa	County Tipperary	Independent Nationalist
1868	George Colthurst	Kinsale	Liberal-Conservative
1865	George Colthurst	Kinsale	Liberal-Conservative
1863 (b)	George Colthurst	Kinsale	Liberal-Conservative
1857	John Ennis	Athlone	Independent Irish Party
1857	John Maguire	Dungarvan	Independent Irish Party
1857	Michael Sullivan	Kilkenny City	Independent Irish Party
1857	John Aloysius Blake	Waterford City	Independent Irish Party
1857	Francis Macnamara Calcutt	Clare	Independent Irish Party
1857	John Greene	County Kilkenny	Independent Irish Party
1857	John Brady	County Leitrim	Independent Irish Party
1857	George Henry Moore	Mayo	Independent Irish Party
1857	Edward McEvoy	Meath	Independent Irish Party
1857	Matthew Corbally	Meath	Independent Irish Party
1857	Daniel O'Donoghue	Tipperary	Independent Irish Party
1857	Richard Levinge	Westmeath	Independent Irish Party
1857	Patrick McMahon	County Wexford	Independent Irish Party
1855 (b)	Edward McEvoy	County Meath	Independent Irish Party
1853 (b)	John Maguire	Dungarvan	Independent Irish Party
1853 (b)	Cornelius O'Brien	County Clare	Independent Irish Party
1851 (b)	Henry Fitzalan-Howard	Limerick City	Independent Whig
1847	Thomas Chisholm Anstey	Youghal	Irish Confederate
1847	William Smith O'Brien	County Limerick	Irish Confederate

== See also ==
- List of Canadian minor party and independent politicians elected
- Non-attached members of the European Parliament

== Sources ==
- British Parliamentary By-Elections since 1945
- List of MPs since 1660
- F. W. S. Craig, British Parliamentary Election Statistics 1832-1987
