= Philip Burton (politician) =

Irish politician (1908–1995)

Senator
- In office 1 June 1973 – 27 October 1977
- Constituency: Administrative Panel

Teachta Dála
- In office June 1969 – February 1973
- Constituency: Cork Mid
- In office October 1961 – June 1969
- Constituency: Cork North-East

Personal details
- Born: 26 July 1908 Kanturk, County Cork, Ireland
- Died: 3 January 1995 (aged 86) County Cork, Ireland
- Party: Fine Gael
- Relatives: Patrick Guiney (uncle); John Guiney (uncle)

Philip Burton (26 July 1908 – 3 January 1995) was an Irish Fine Gael politician, farmer and auctioneer.

He was born in the townland of Curragh, Kanturk, County Cork, the son of Francis Burton, a farmer, and Anne Guiney. His maternal uncles were All-for-Ireland League MPs for North Cork Patrick Guiney and John Guiney.

He was elected to Dáil Éireann as a Fine Gael Teachta Dála (TD) for the Cork North-East constituency at the 1961 general election. He was re-elected at the 1965 and 1969 general elections (for Cork Mid from 1969), but lost his seat at the 1973 general election. He was subsequently elected to the 13th Seanad on the Administrative Panel. He retired from politics in 1977.

Dáil	Election	Deputy (Party)	Deputy (Party)	Deputy (Party)	Deputy (Party)	Deputy (Party)
17th	1961	John Moher (FF)	Martin Corry (FF)	Philip Burton (FG)	Richard Barry (FG)	Patrick McAuliffe (Lab)
18th	1965	Jerry Cronin (FF)	Martin Corry (FF)	Philip Burton (FG)	Richard Barry (FG)	Patrick McAuliffe (Lab)
19th	1969	Jerry Cronin (FF)	Seán Brosnan (FF)	Gerard Cott (FG)	Richard Barry (FG)	4 seats 1969–1981
20th	1973	Jerry Cronin (FF)	Liam Ahern (FF)	Patrick Hegarty (FG)	Richard Barry (FG)	4 seats 1969–1981
20th	1974 by-election	Jerry Cronin (FF)	Seán Brosnan (FF)	Patrick Hegarty (FG)	Richard Barry (FG)	4 seats 1969–1981
21st	1977	Jerry Cronin (FF)	Seán Brosnan (FF)	Patrick Hegarty (FG)	Richard Barry (FG)	4 seats 1969–1981
21st	1979 by-election	Jerry Cronin (FF)	Myra Barry (FG)	Patrick Hegarty (FG)	Richard Barry (FG)	4 seats 1969–1981
22nd	1981	Constituency abolished. See Cork East and Cork North-West				

Dáil	Election	Deputy (Party)	Deputy (Party)	Deputy (Party)	Deputy (Party)	Deputy (Party)
17th	1961	Dan Desmond (Lab)	Seán McCarthy (FF)	Con Meaney (FF)	Denis J. O'Sullivan (FG)	4 seats 1961–1977
17th	1965 by-election	Eileen Desmond (Lab)	Seán McCarthy (FF)	Con Meaney (FF)	Denis J. O'Sullivan (FG)	4 seats 1961–1977
18th	1965	Eileen Desmond (Lab)	Flor Crowley (FF)	Thomas Meaney (FF)	Donal Creed (FG)	4 seats 1961–1977
19th	1969	Philip Burton (FG)	Paddy Forde (FF)	Thomas Meaney (FF)	Donal Creed (FG)	4 seats 1961–1977
19th	1972 by-election	Philip Burton (FG)	Gene Fitzgerald (FF)	Thomas Meaney (FF)	Donal Creed (FG)	4 seats 1961–1977
20th	1973	Eileen Desmond (Lab)	Gene Fitzgerald (FF)	Thomas Meaney (FF)	Donal Creed (FG)	4 seats 1961–1977
21st	1977	Eileen Desmond (Lab)	Gene Fitzgerald (FF)	Thomas Meaney (FF)	Donal Creed (FG)	Barry Cogan (FF)
22nd	1981	Constituency abolished. See Cork North-Central and Cork South-Central				
