= Tim Healy (politician) =

Irish politician (1855–1931)

- Healy, c. 1915

Governor-General of the Irish Free State
- In office 6 December 1922 – 31 January 1928
- Monarch: George V
- President: W. T. Cosgrave
- Preceded by: New office
- Succeeded by: James McNeill

Member of Parliament
- In office 15 July 1911 – 4 November 1918
- Preceded by: Moreton Frewen
- Succeeded by: Thomas Hunter
- Constituency: North East Cork
- In office 4 July 1892 – 3 December 1910
- Preceded by: Joseph Nolan
- Succeeded by: Richard Hazleton
- Constituency: North Louth
- In office 5 February 1887 – 4 July 1892
- Preceded by: Justin McCarthy
- Succeeded by: Justin McCarthy
- Constituency: North Longford
- In office 24 November 1885 – 1 July 1886
- Preceded by: Constituency established
- Succeeded by: Thomas Lea
- Constituency: South Londonderry
- In office 24 November 1885 – 10 February 1886
- Preceded by: Constituency established
- Succeeded by: Pat O'Brien
- Constituency: North Monaghan
- In office 30 June 1883 – 24 November 1885
- Preceded by: John Givan
- Succeeded by: Constituency abolished
- Constituency: County Monaghan
- In office 31 March 1880 – 30 June 1883
- Preceded by: William Redmond
- Succeeded by: Willie Redmond
- Constituency: Wexford

Personal details
- Born: 17 May 1855 Bantry, County Cork, Ireland
- Died: 26 March 1931 (aged 75) Chapelizod, County Dublin, Ireland
- Party: Irish Parliamentary Party; Irish National Federation; People's Rights Association; All-for-Ireland League
- Spouse: Erina Sullivan (m. 1882; died 1927)
- Relations: Maurice Healy (brother); Thomas Healy (brother); Kevin O'Higgins (nephew)

Timothy Michael Healy, KC (17 May 1855 – 26 March 1931) was an Irish barrister, nationalist politician, journalist and author. His political career began in the 1880s when he became a Member of Parliament (MP) in the House of Commons and continued into the 1920s, when he was appointed as the first governor-general of the Irish Free State.

== Family background ==
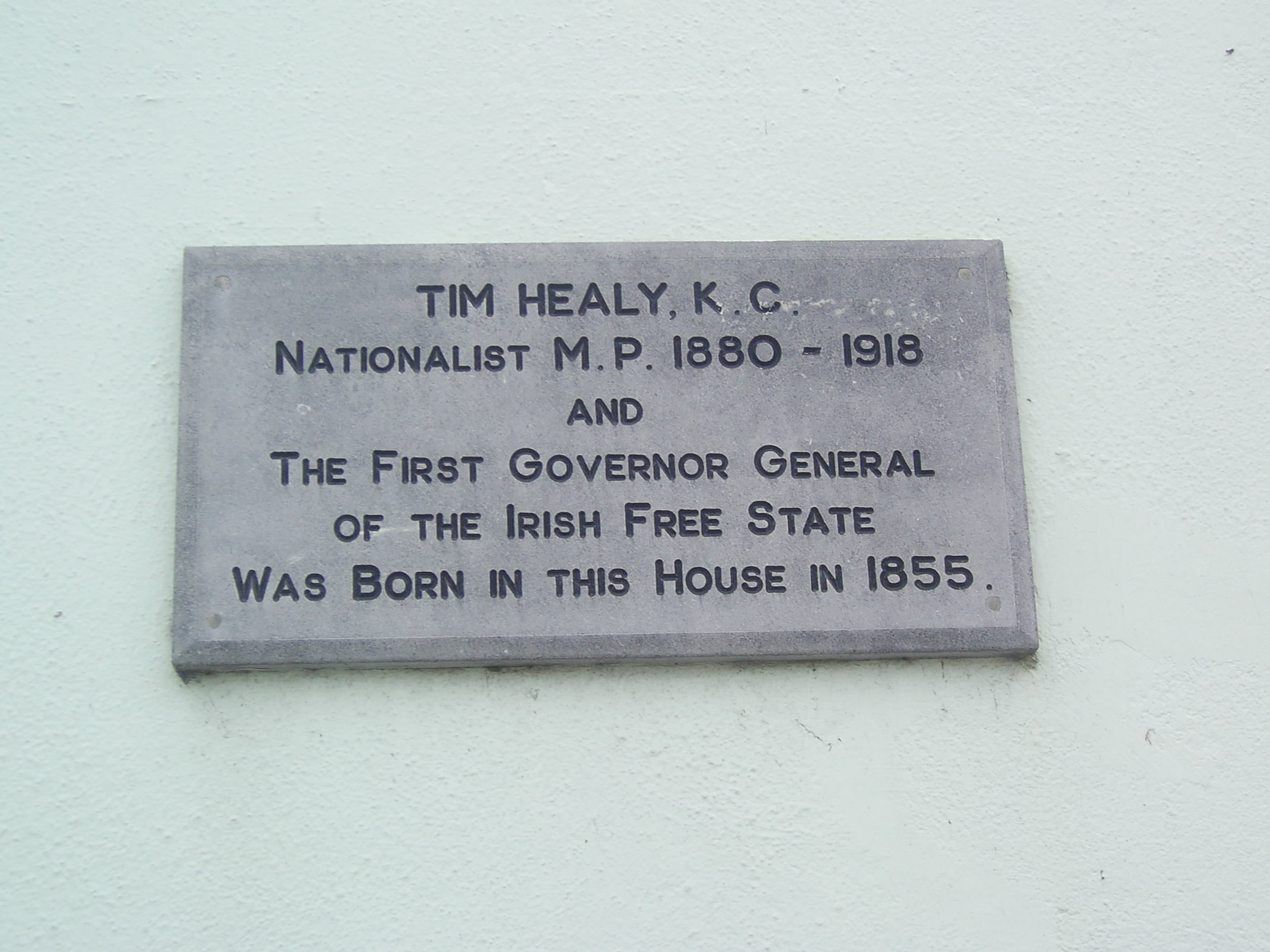
Plaque commemorating Tim Healy's birth on Bantry's Wolfe Tone Square.

He was born in Bantry, County Cork, the second son of Maurice Healy, clerk of the Bantry Poor Law Union, and Eliza (née Sullivan) Healy. His elder brother, Thomas Healy (1854–1924), became a solicitor and Member of Parliament (MP) (1892–1900) for North Wexford. His younger brother, Maurice Healy (1859–1923), with whom he held a lifelong close relationship, also became a solicitor and served at Westminster as MP for Cork City between 1885 and 1918.

His father was descended from a family line which in holding to their Catholic faith, lost their lands, which he compensated for by being a scholarly gentleman.

Timothy Michael Healy was educated at the Christian Brothers school in Fermoy, and was otherwise largely self-educated, in 1869 at the age of fourteen going to live with his uncle, Timothy Daniel Sullivan MP, in Dublin.

== Early life ==
He then moved to England finding employment in 1871 with the North Eastern Railway Company in Newcastle-upon-Tyne. There he became deeply involved in the Irish Home Rule politics of the local Irish community. After leaving for London in 1878 Healy worked as a confidential clerk in a factory owned by his relative, then worked as a parliamentary correspondent for The Nation newspaper owned by his uncle, writing numerous articles in support of Parnell, the newly emergent and more militant home rule leader, and his policy of parliamentary obstructionism.

Parnell admired Healy's intelligence and energy after Healy had established himself as part of Parnell's broader political circle. He became Parnell's secretary but was denied contact to Parnell's small inner circle of political colleagues.

Parnell, however, brought Healy into the Irish Parliamentary Party (IPP) and supported him as a nationalist candidate for a by-election to Wexford in 1880 following the death of William Archer Redmond, against John Redmond, the son of the deceased MP. After John Redmond stood aside, Healy was returned unopposed to parliament.

== Political career in the Irish Parliamentary Party ==
In parliament, Healy did not physically cut an imposing figure but impressed by the application of sheer intelligence, diligence and volatile use of speech when he achieved the Healy Clause in the Land Law (Ireland) Act 1881 which provided that no further rent should in future be charged on tenant's improvements. By the mid-1880s Healy had already acquired a reputation for a scurrilousness of tone. He married his cousin Eliza Sullivan in 1882, they had three daughters and three sons and he enjoyed a happy and intense family life, closely interlinked both by friendship and intermarriage with the Sullivans of west Cork.

Through his reputation as a friend of the farmers, after having been imprisoned for four months following an agrarian case, and backed by Parnell, he was elected in a County Monaghan by-election in June 1883, deemed to be the climax in the Healy–Parnell relationship. In 1884 he was called to the Irish bar as a barrister (in 1889 to the inner bar as King's Counsel, in London in 1910). His reputation allowed him to build an extensive legal practice, particularly in land cases. He was elected for South Londonderry in 1885, but lost to a Liberal Unionist in 1886. In the 1887 North Longford by-election, he was returned unopposed.

Prompted by the depression in the prices of dairy products and cattle in the mid-1880 as well as bad weather for a number of years, many tenant farmers unable to pay their rents were left under the threat of eviction. Healy devised a strategy to secure a reduction in rent from the landlords which became known as the Plan of Campaign, organised in 1886 amongst others by Timothy Harrington.

== Invective rift with Parnell ==
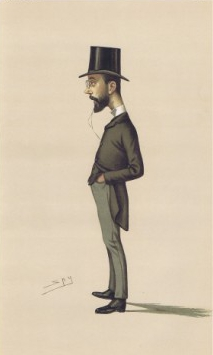
Healy caricatured by Spy in Vanity Fair, 1886

Initially a passionate supporter of Parnell, he became disenchanted with his leader after Healy opposed Parnell's nomination of Captain William O'Shea to stand for a by-election in Galway city. At the time O'Shea was separated from his wife, Katharine O'Shea, with whom Parnell was secretly living. Healy objected to this, as the party had not been consulted and he believed Parnell was putting his personal relationship before the national interest. When Parnell travelled to Galway to support O'Shea, Healy was forced to back down.

In 1890, O'Shea sued his wife for divorce, citing Parnell as co-respondent. Healy and most of Parnell's associates rejected Parnell's continuing leadership of the party, believing it was recklessly endangering the party's alliance with Gladstonian Liberalism. Healy became Parnell's most outspoken critic. When Parnell asked his colleagues at one party meeting "Who is the master of the party?", Healy famously retorted with another question "Aye, but who is the mistress of the party?" – a comment that almost led to the men coming to blows. His savage onslaught in public reflected his conservative Catholic origin. A substantial minority of the Irish people never forgave him for his role during the divorce crisis, permanently damaging his own standing in public life. The rift prompted nine-year-old Dublin schoolboy James Joyce to write a poem called Et Tu, Healy?, which Joyce's father had printed and circulated. Only three lines remain:

His quaint-perched aerie on the crags of Time
Where the rude din of this century
Can trouble him no more.

== Estrangement from the political establishment ==
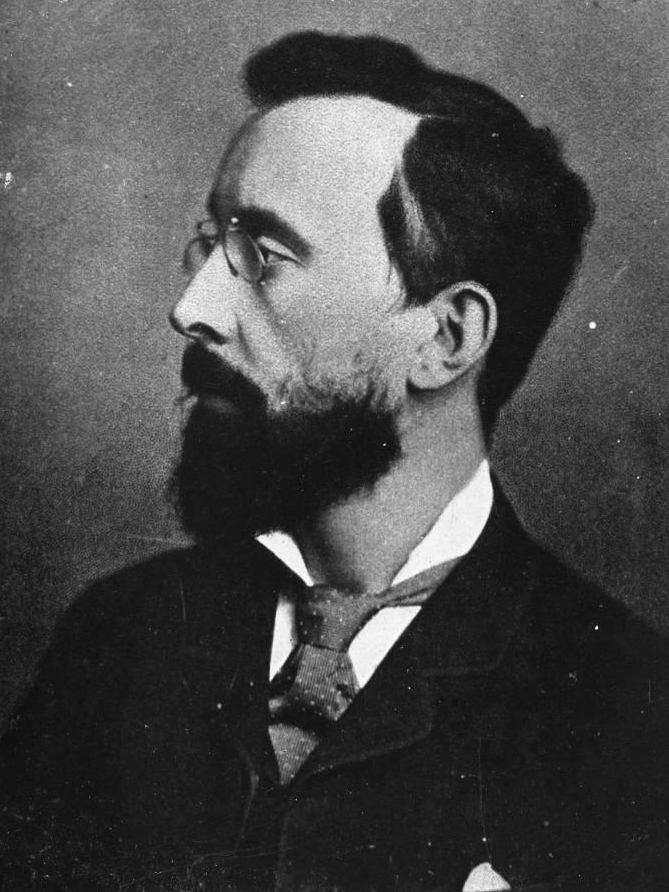
Healy, c. 1900

Following Parnell's death in 1891, the IPP's anti-Parnellite majority group broke away forming the Irish National Federation (INF) under John Dillon. Healy was at first its most outspoken member, when in 1892 he won North Louth as an anti-Parnellites, who in all won seventy-one seats. But finding it impossible to work with or under any post-Parnell leadership, especially Dillon's, he was expelled in 1895 from the INF executive committee, having previously been expelled from the Irish party's minor nine-member pro-Parnellite Irish National League (INL) under John Redmond.

In the following decades, largely due to his expanding legal practice, he became a part-time politician and estranged from the national movement, setting up his own personal 'Healyite' organisation, called the "People's Rights Association", based on his position as MP for North Louth (a seat he held until the December 1910 election when defeated by Richard Hazleton). He waged war during the 1890s with Dillon and his National Federation (INF) and then intrigued with Redmond's smaller Parnellite group to play a substantial role behind the scenes in helping the rival party factions to reunite under Redmond in 1900.

Healy was extremely embittered by the fact that both his brothers and his followers were purged from the IPP list in the 1900 general election, and that his support for Redmond in the re-united party went unrewarded; on the contrary, Redmond soon found it wiser to conciliate Dillon. But two years later Healy was again expelled. He remained "the enemy within", recruiting malcontent MPs to harass the party and survived politically by dint of his assiduous constituency work, as well as through the influence of his clerical ally Dr. Michael Cardinal Logue, Primate of All Ireland and Archbishop of Armagh. Healy remained rooted in the extended 'Bantry Gang', a highly influential political and commercial nexus based originally in West Cork, which included his key patron, the Catholic business magnate and owner of the Irish Independent, William Martin Murphy, who provided a platform for Healy and other critics of the IPP.

== Coalition of a kind ==
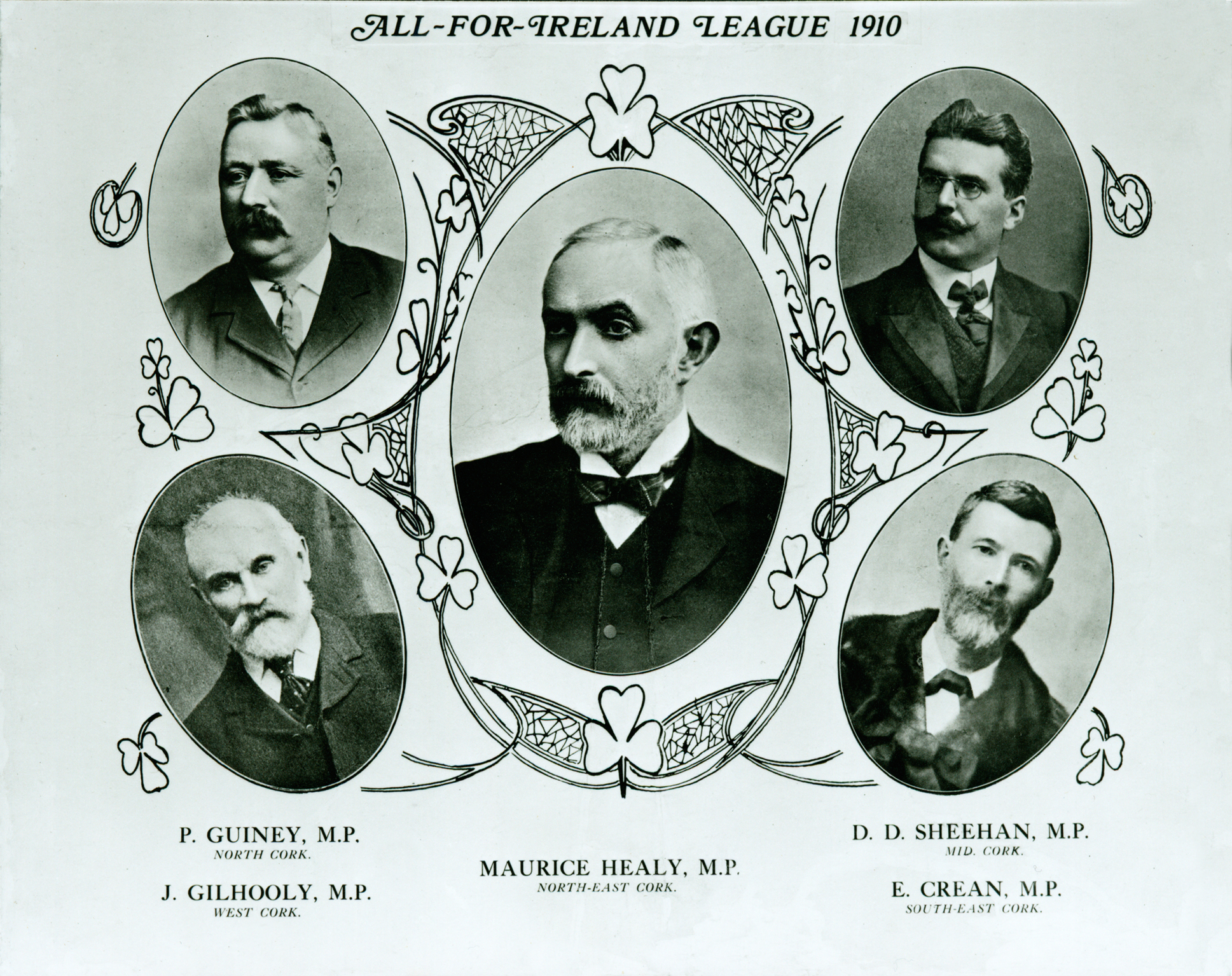
All-for-Ireland League group portrait of five of its independent Members of Parliament, 1910. These are: Patrick Guiney (North Cork), James Gilhooly (West Cork), Maurice Healy (North East Cork), D. D. Sheehan (Mid Cork), and Eugene Crean (South East Cork). The other MPs elected in January 1910 were: William O'Brien (Cork City), John O'Donnell (South Mayo) and Timothy Healy (North Louth). Maurice and Timothy Healy were brothers.

However, at least after 1903, Healy was joined in his estrangement from the party leadership by William O'Brien. O’Brien had been for years one of Healy's strongest critics, but now he too felt annoyed both by his own alienation from the party and by Redmond's subservience to Dillon. Involved with the Irish Reform Association 1904–5, they entered a loose coalition, which lasted throughout the life of the IPP. They were in agreement that agrarian radicalism brought little return, Healy supported the introduction of home rule through peaceful means.

With Healy practically becoming a Parnellite, they preferred to pursue a policy of conciliation with the Protestant class in order to further the acceptance of Home Rule. Redmond was sympathetic to this policy but was inhibited by Dillon. Redmond, in an act of rapprochement, briefly re-united them with the party in 1908. Fiercely independent, both split off again in 1909, responding to real changes in the social basis of Irish politics. In 1908 Healy acted as counsel for Sir Arthur Vicars, former Ulster King of Arms, in connection with the 1908 investigation of the previous year's theft of the Irish Crown Jewels.

By the 1910s, it looked as though Healy was to remain a maverick on the fringes of Irish nationalism. However, he came into notoriety once more when returned in the January 1910 general election in alliance with William O'Brien's newly founded All-for-Ireland Party (AFIL), their alliance based largely on common opposition to the Irish party. He lost his seat in the following December 1910 election, but soon afterwards rejoined the O'Brienites, O’Brien providing the 1911 North East Cork by-election vacancy created by the retirement of Moreton Frewen. Healy's reputation was not enhanced when he represented as counsel his associate William Martin Murphy, the industrialist who sparked the 1913 Dublin Lockout. Healy assiduously cultivated relationships with power brokers in Westminster such as Lord Beaverbrook, and once they were introduced at Cherkley, was great friends with Janet Aitken for the remainder of his life.

== Realignment ==
Redmond's and the IPP's powerful position of holding the balance of power at Westminster—and with the passing of the Third Home Rule Bill assured—left Healy and the AFIL critics in a weakened position. They condemned the bill as a 'partition deal', abstaining from its final vote in the Commons. With the outbreak of World War I in August 1914, the Healy brothers supported the Allied and the British war effort. Two had a son enlist in one of the Irish divisions, Timothy's eldest son, Joe, fought with distinction at Gallipoli.

Having done much to damage the popular image and authority of constitutional nationalism, Healy after the Easter Rising was convinced that the IPP and Redmond were doomed and slowly withdrew from the forefront of politics, making it clear in 1917 that he was in general sympathy with Arthur Griffith's Sinn Féin movement, but not with physical force methods. In September that year he acted as counsel for the family of the dead Sinn Féin hunger striker Thomas Ashe. He was one of the few King's Counsel to provide legal services to members of Sinn Féin in various legal proceedings in both Ireland and England post the 1916 Rising. This included acting for those interned in 1916 in Frongoch internment camp in North Wales. In 1916, he also represented the family of Francis Sheehy Skeffington as an observer at the court martial of Captain Bowen-Colthurst, and he participated in the subsequent Royal Commission of Inquiry into the murders at Portobello Barracks.

During this time, Healy also represented Georgina Frost, in her attempts to be appointed a Petty Sessions clerk in her native County Clare. In 1920 the Bar Council of Ireland passed an initial resolution that any barrister appearing before the Dáil Courts would be guilty of professional misconduct. This was challenged by Tim Healy and no final decision was made on the matter.

Before the December 1918 general election, he was the first of the AFIL members to resign his seat in favour of the Sinn Féin party's candidate, and spoke in support of P. J. Little, the Sinn Féin candidate for Rathmines in Dublin.

== Governor-General ==
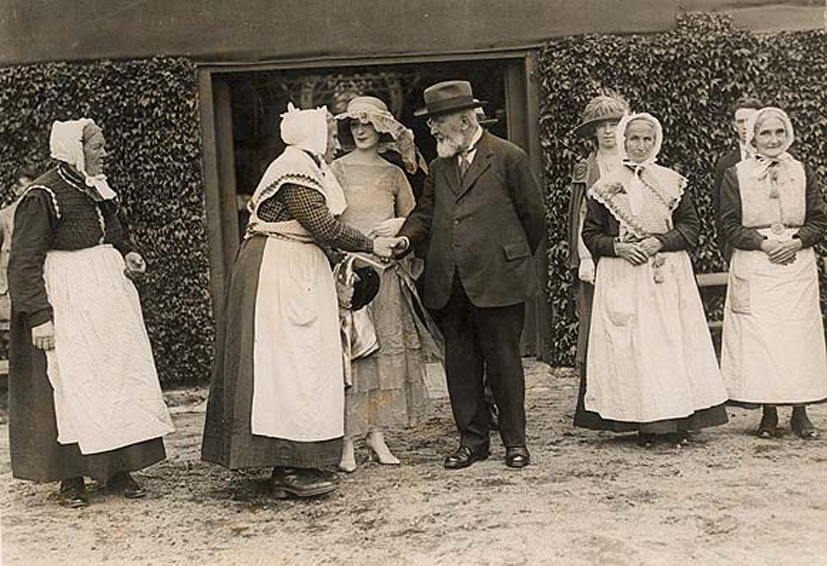
Healy, on the first day of the Dublin Horse Show, meeting women from the Industry Workers of County Longford, 14 August 1923

He returned to considerable prominence in 1922 when, on the urging of the soon-to-be Irish Free State's Provisional Government of W. T. Cosgrave, the British government recommended to King George V that Healy be appointed the first 'Governor-General of the Irish Free State', a new office representative of the Crown created in the 1921 Anglo-Irish Treaty and introduced by a combination of the Constitution of the Irish Free State and Letters Patent from the King. The constitution was enacted in December 1922. Healy was the uncle of Kevin O'Higgins, the Vice-President of the Executive Council and Minister for Justice in the new Free State.

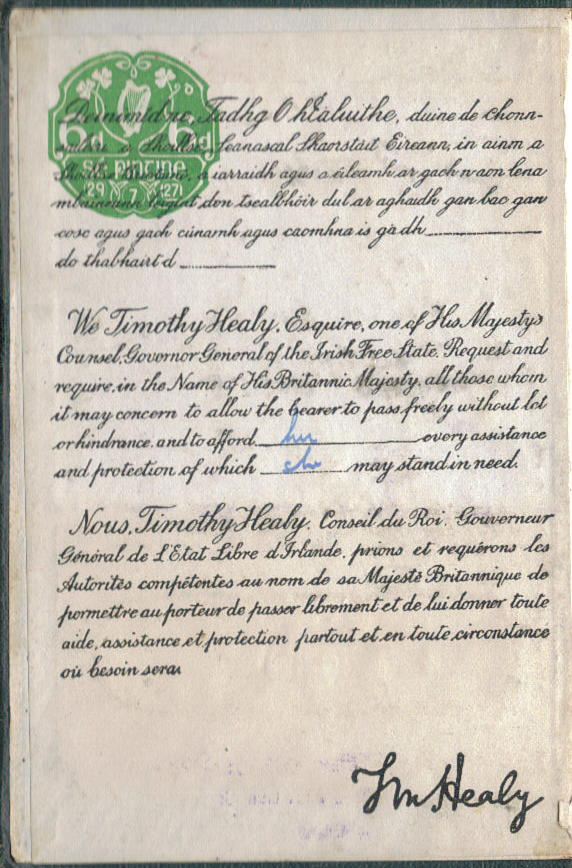
Statement on Irish Free State passport (1927): We Timothy Healy, Esquire, one of His Majesty's Counsel, Governor-General of the Irish Free State, Request and require, in the Name of His Britannic Majesty, all those whom it may concern to allow the bearer to pass freely … etc.

Initially, the Government of the Irish Free State under Cosgrave wished for Healy to reside in a new small residence, but, facing death threats from the IRA, he was moved as a temporary measure into the Viceregal Lodge, the former 'out of season' residence of the Lord Lieutenant, the former representative of the Crown until 1922.

Healy officially entered office as Governor-General on 6 December 1922. He never wore, certainly not in public in Ireland, the official ceremonial uniform of a Governor-General in the British Empire. At that time, in the 1920s, Healy was unique amongst viceregal representatives in the British Empire in this regard. Healy was also unique (along with his successor, James McNeill) amongst all the Governors-General in the British Empire in the 1920s in that he was never sworn in as a member of the Imperial Privy Council. Nor was he ever sworn into the Privy Council of Ireland, a body that ceased to exist in early December 1922. Thus, unusually for a Governor-General within the Empire, he never gained the prefix 'The Right Honourable' nor the post-nominals 'PC'.

Healy proved an able Governor-General, possessing a degree of political skill, deep political insight and contacts in Britain that the new Irish Government initially lacked, and had long recommended himself to the Catholic Hierarchy: all-round good credentials for this key symbolic and reconciling position at the centre of public life. He joked once that the government didn't advise him, he advised the government: a comment at a dinner for The Duke of York (the future King George VI) that led to public criticism. However, the waspish Healy still could not help courting further controversy, most notably in a public attack on the new Fianna Fáil and its leader, Éamon de Valera, which led to republican calls for his resignation.

Much of the contact between governments in London and Dublin went through Healy. He had access to all sensitive state papers, and received instructions from the British Government on the use of his powers to grant, withhold or refuse the Royal Assent to legislation enacted by the Oireachtas. For instance, Healy was instructed to reject any bill that abolished the Oath of Allegiance. However, neither this nor any other bill that he was secretly instructed to block were introduced during his time as Governor-General. That role of being the UK government's representative, and acting on its advice, was abandoned throughout the British Commonwealth in the mid-1920s as a result of an Imperial Conference decision, leaving him and his successors exclusively as the King's representative and nominal head of the Irish executive.

Concerning the Irish Boundary Commission (1924–25) which determined the border between the Irish Free State and Northern Ireland, Healy made clear his opinion on how the border should be determined:

The requirement of the Treaty that the Boundary should be determined in accordance with the wishes of the inhabitants subject to the other conditions therein mentioned, renders it necessary that the wishes of the inhabitants first be ascertained.

During negotiations for the Anglo-Irish Treaty, Healy had been assured by Winston Churchill that large areas of Northern Ireland would be transferred to Irish Free State - Counties Tyrone and Fermanagh, south Armagh, south Down, along with the towns of Enniskillen, Londonderry and Newry (those transfers never occurred).

Healy seemed to believe that he had been awarded the Governor-Generalship for life. However, the Executive Council of the Irish Free State decided in 1927 that the term of office of Governors-General would be five years. As a result, he retired from the office and public life in January 1928. His wife had died the previous year. He published his extensive two-volume memoirs in 1928. Throughout his life he was formidable because he was ferociously quick-witted, because he was unworried by social or political convention, and because he knew no party discipline. Towards the end of his life he mellowed and became otherwise more diplomatic.

He died on 26 March 1931, aged 75, in Chapelizod, County Dublin, where he lived at his home in Glenaulin, and was buried in Glasnevin Cemetery.

== Cultural depictions ==
In his novel The Man Who Was Thursday, G. K. Chesterton describes one of his characters as a "... little man, with a black beard and glasses – a man somewhat of the type of Mr Tim Healy ...".

Political offices
New office	Governor-General of the Irish Free State; 1922–1928	Succeeded by James McNeill
Parliament of the United Kingdom
Preceded by William Redmond	Member of Parliament for Wexford; 1880–1883	Succeeded by Willie Redmond
Preceded by John Givan	Member of Parliament for County Monaghan; 1883–1885; With: Willian Findlater 1883–1885	Constituency divided
New constituency	Member of Parliament for North Monaghan; 1885–1886	Succeeded by Pat O'Brien
New constituency	Member of Parliament for South Londonderry; 1885–1886	Succeeded by Thomas Lea
Preceded by Justin McCarthy	Member of Parliament for North Longford; 1887–1892	Succeeded by Justin McCarthy
Preceded by Joseph Nolan	Member of Parliament for North Louth; 1892–December 1910	Succeeded by Richard Hazleton
Preceded by Moreton Frewen	Member of Parliament for North East Cork; 1911–1918	Succeeded by Thomas Hunter
