= Thomas Hunter (Irish politician) =

Irish politician (1883–1932)

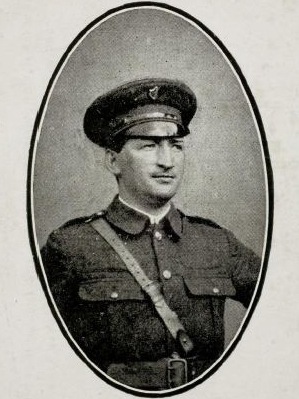
- Hunter, c.1916

Teachta Dála
- In office May 1921 – June 1922
- Constituency: Cork East and North East
- In office December 1918 – May 1921
- Constituency: Cork North East

Personal details
- Born: 10 November 1883 Castletownroche, County Cork, Ireland
- Died: 11 March 1932 (aged 48) Glanworth, County Cork
- Party: Sinn Féin
- Military service
- Allegiance: Irish Republic
- Service: Irish Volunteers; Irish Republican Army; Anti-Treaty IRA
- Service years: 1913–1919 (Irish Volunteers); 1919–1922 (Irish Republican Army); 1922–1923 (Anti-Treaty IRA)
- Rank: Vice-Commandant
- Units: 2nd Battalion, Dublin Brigade, Irish Volunteers
- Conflicts: Easter Rising; Irish War of Independence; Irish Civil War
- Awards: 1916 Medal; Service Medal (1917–1921)

Thomas Cornelius Hunter (10 November 1883 – 11 March 1932) was a militant Irish republican. He was a member of the Irish Republican Brotherhood (IRB), Sinn Féin, the Irish Volunteers, was twice elected to the Irish parliament, Dáil Éireann, and served as a member of the Irish Republican Army during the Irish Civil War. He was involved in several events connected to the Irish independence movement.

== Early life ==
Hunter was born in 1883 in the village of Castletownroche, County Cork in Ireland, son of Con Hunter, a baker, and his wife Ellen (née Hayes) of Glanworth. In 1907, he moved to Dublin to begin his apprenticeship as a draper. He later joined Conradh na Gaeilge and was associated with Thomas Clarke. He was a close friend to Con Colbert (after whom he would name his only child) and William T. Cosgrave.

== IRB and the Irish Volunteers ==
It did not take long for him to find his way into the IRB. By 1910, he was a member of the Henry Joy McCracken Circle, which was based out of 41 Parnell Square on Dublin's northside. This Circle, or cell, was attached to the Munitions Section and focused mainly on the procurement of small arms. Between 1911 and 1912, Hunter became the "Centre" of the Circle. As a Centre, one of his duties was to visit other Circles and deliver various military lectures. He did this frequently with Con Colbert, who was Centre for another Circle. Hunter would remain Centre of this Circle right up to the 1916 Easter Rising.

At the formation of the Irish Volunteers in November 1913, Hunter was appointed Vice-Commandant of the 2nd Battalion, Dublin Brigade, under Thomas MacDonagh.

On 26 July 1914, the 2nd Battalion was ordered to march to Howth to assist in the landing of approximately 900 rifles and ammunition brought by Erskine Childers aboard the yacht Asgard. It is unclear whether Hunter took part in the march or the landing itself; however, he was involved in the recovery of rifles that had been dispersed and in their subsequent distribution and storage. This activity reflected his organisational role within the IRB.

On 1 August 1914, Hunter, working with Peadar Clancy, was involved in the Kilcoole gun-running, during which approximately 600 rifles and ammunition were landed in County Wicklow.

Following the Redmondite Split of September 1914, Hunter was appointed to the IRB Supreme Council after the departure of Bulmer Hobson. He attended one meeting before resigning his position, which was then taken by Sean Tobin. Around the same period, Thomas MacDonagh assumed command of the Dublin Brigade, leaving Hunter in charge of 2nd Battalion.

The split resulted in a majority of the Irish Volunteers following John Redmond and the Irish Parliamentary Party into the British Army during the First World War. Those who remained formed a smaller organisation under existing leadership. Professor Liam Ó Briain later described the post-split structure of the Volunteers as follows:

At last we had a real body with a real purpose. Organisation was improved by able leaders like Thomas MacDonagh, of the Dublin Brigade, and Brigade-Adjutant Éamon de Valera; Ned Daly and Piaras Béaslaí in the first battalions; Tom Hunter, Eamon Price, and Richard Mulcahy in the second, Eamon Ceannt and Cathal Brugha in the fourth.

== Easter Rising and internment ==
In late 1915, the IRB Military Council fixed Easter Sunday as the date for the planned rising. This decision was restricted to members of the Military Council and was not shared with the wider IRB leadership, including Eoin MacNeill. Concerns also arose regarding the position of James Connolly, leader of the Irish Citizens Army, who had indicated that he might initiate action independently of the Irish Volunteers and the IRB.

To address this, a meeting was held on 19 January 1916 between Connolly and members of the Military Council, including Patrick Pearse, Tom Clarke, Éamonn Ceannt, Seán Mac Diarmada and Joseph Plunkett. The meeting took place at a private residence in Dolphin's Barn and continued over several days. By 22 January, Connolly had agreed to align the Irish Citizens Army with the plans and timetable of the IRB Military Council, was inducted into the IRB, and appointed to the Military Council. During this period, Connolly’s absence was not publicly explained, and on his return he did not discuss the meetings. Contemporary accounts later produced differing explanations, including claims that he had been detained by the IRB or that he had been absent for personal reasons.

Information relating to these meetings appears to have circulated within the senior ranks of the Irish Volunteers shortly thereafter. On 19 January 1916, Hunter was recorded by the Dublin Metropolitan Police (DMP) as attending an evening meeting at Irish Volunteers headquarters, 2 Dawson Street. Other attendees listed in the report included Eoin MacNeill, Herbert ‘Barney’ Mellows, Eoin O'Duffy, Michael J. O'Rahilly, Patrick Pearse, Thomas MacDonagh, Joseph McGuinness, Joseph O'Connor, Joseph Plunkett, Éamon de Valera, Seán Mac Diarmada, Bulmer Hobson, Éamonn Ceannt, JJ "Ginger" O'Connell, Sean Fitzgibbon, Piaras Béaslaí, Con Colbert, and Thomas McCarthy. The report identified Hunter as employed as a draper’s assistant at Pim’s Department Store and holding the rank of Captain in the Volunteers.

The attendance list shows that five of the seven signatories of the Proclamation of the Irish Republic were present. James Connolly and Tom Clarke were not recorded as attending.

On 21 January 1916, Hunter was again recorded by the Dublin Metropolitan Police (DMP) as attending an evening meeting at Irish Volunteers headquarters. Other individuals listed as present were Éamon de Valera, Joseph McGuinness, Michael O'Hanrahan, JJ "Ginger" O'Connell, Con Colbert, and Thomas MacDonagh.

By St Patrick's Day 1916, MacDonagh's prolonged absenses due to his responsibilities with the IRB Military Council and Dublin Brigade command meant that operational control of the 2nd Battalion was generally exercised by Hunter. This led to confusion among some Volunteers would assumed he was a Commandant as he was commanding the battalion.

The Rising was originally planned to begin at noon on Easter Sunday. The operation was organised in secrecy by the IRB Military Council, and most rank-and-file Volunteers were not informed of its full scope. While mobilisation orders for extended manoeuvres and rations may have suggested unusual activity, the intended scale of the operation was not widely known. This secrecy was compromised when Bulmer Hobson became aware of the plan at an IRB Centre meeting on the evening before Good Friday.

There are two versions to the story of Hobson's subsequent arrest. The first is that he left the IRB meeting and went directly to report the news of The Rising to Eoin MacNeill, Chief of Staff for the Irish Volunteers. MacNeill immediately issued countermanding orders to the Volunteers across the island that all maneuvers were off. The IRB Military Council issued orders for Hobson's arrest before he could cause more confusion. One of the leading men sent to apprehend him was Hunter. The other version is that the decision to arrest Hobson was made on the Monday before his IRB Centre meeting. In either case, these countermanding orders, obviously, threw the months of planning into chaos and, other than the Dublin Brigade, few Volunteer groups across Ireland rose in any significant way.

After spending most of Friday and into Saturday night keeping guard over Hobson, Hunter was at Liberty Hall with James Connolly early on Easter Sunday morning. The emotions of those in the building were obviously raw. While the Military Council dealt with the fall-out and replanning for rising the next day, Hunter was soon busy on the streets of Dublin, organizing and directing the Volunteers. From Father Mathew Park in the suburb of Fairview, Hunter spent most of the day dispatching bicycle messengers to inform the Volunteers to stand ready in their homes and to await further orders. At 7 o'clock Sunday evening, he stopped by the home of Tom Slater. Slater was Hunter's Adjutant in the 2nd Battalion. Together they walked to the Jacob's Biscuit Factory, being joined by Lt. Leo Henderson along the way. As they were on this roughly hour-long walk to Jacob's, Hunter informed the two that there was definitely something planned for the next day, that they would be located in this section of the city and that Hunter wanted to get a better look at the place. Once they had investigated the area, they then walked the hour back to the north side of the city. Hunter then left the other two and went to meet MacDonagh to discuss what he saw.

Between 6am and 7am on Easter Monday, Hunter was back in Father Mathew Park, issuing orders and dispatches via bicycle messengers. This time the orders were to mobilize at Father Mathew Park in time to be at St Stephen's Green by 10am. The Volunteers were to draw as little attention to themselves as possible, not to march in formation and, as much as possible, to simply "appear" at Stephen's Green. As the morning wore on and more and more men reported, the orders were changed to simply make for Stephen's Green, skipping Father Mathew Park altogether. Shortly after 11am, Hunter arrived at Stephen's Green and saw to organizing the Companies. At 11:45am, Major John MacBride arrived on the scene and asked MacDonagh if he could join in the fight. At around 11:50am, the 2nd Battalion were led out of Stephen's Green and marched the short distance to the Jacob's Biscuit Factory, a monolithic building with high towers dominating Dublin Castle, the seat of British administration in Ireland, on one side and the approach from Portobello Barracks from Rathmines on the other. At noon, the planned time for the start of the Rising, MacDonagh issued the order to enter the factory and evict any workers and to set about fortifying the structure. At 2pm, Hunter and a small detachment were ordered to take and hold an outpost position at New Street and Fumbally Lane. After a few hours, this detachment was ordered back to the main body as it was determined that holding the position was untenable should it come under attack.

The garrison kept any British approach to the city from its area pinned down by sniping, and sent out groups to reconnoitre and supply other garrisons fighting in the College of Surgeons, Marrowbone Lane Distillery and the GPO. By midweek, communication with the GPO was severed. Pádraig Pearse and the GPO garrison retreated to Moore Street on Friday and surrendered that night in a city now occupied by 20,000 British troops. His order to the remaining fighters to surrender were delivered the following Sunday by two Franciscan priests.

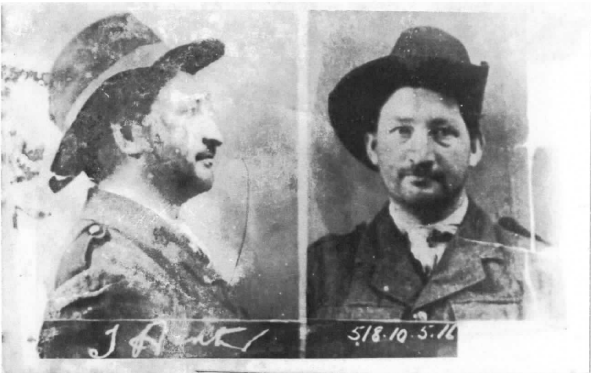
Processing photos from Richmond Barracks immediately after the surrender.

Following the Rising, Hunter was sentenced to death – this was later commuted to penal servitude for life. In 1917 Hunter, along with Éamon de Valera and Thomas Ashe, was recognised by his fellow prisoners at Lewes prison as one of their Commanding Officers. On 28 May of that year, de Valera, Ashe and Hunter lead a prison hunger-strike demanding to be treated as prisoners of war and not regular criminals. This led the British authorities to remove the prisoners from Lewes to separate facilities. On 5 June, Hunter was moved to Maidstone Prison with de Valera, albeit in a separate car. By 18 June 1917, all participants of the Easter Rising had been released.

Subset from "Group portrait of released 1916 prisoners outside Mansion House, Dawson Street, Dublin", showing Eoin MacNeill, Éamon de Valera, Thomas Hunter and Piaras Béaslaí.

== War of Independence ==
On the night of 17 May 1918, Hunter was again arrested, this time along with almost all the other members of the Sinn Féin leadership during the "German Plot". Warnings of this arrest were made by the fledgling information network set up by Michael Collins. While imprisoned at Gloucester Gaol, he contracted influenza. On 24 February 1919, he was moved to Gloucester City Infirmary for treatment and remained there until 6 March.

In the autumn of 1919, Hunter introduced Dan Breen to Liam Lynch, both of whom were on the run from the British authorities.

By March 1920, Hunter and his partner, Peadar Clancy, had established a drapery and tailoring business, "The Republican Outfitters", on Talbot Street in Dublin. Hunter was once again arrested, this time for his involvement in the theft of Lord Lieutenant French's documents. While incarcerated in Mountjoy Prison, Hunter and several others, including Clancy and Frank Gallagher, began a hunger-strike on 5 April, demanding to be treated as prisoners of war. News of these hunger-strikes sparked general strikes called by the trade unions and large scale demonstrations in Dublin to show support for the hunger strikers. On 14 April 1920, all hunger striking prisoners were released, and Hunter was moved to Jervis Street Hospital. On 26 April, he was discharged as "improved". From this time until his death, his health continued to be in decline.

In October 1920, during a "wholesale raid" of the homes of Sinn Féin members, British troops attacked Hunter & Clancy's business, severely damaging the building. It was mistakenly reported at the time that Hunter was among the dead. The dead IRA officer was actually Seán Treacy.

== Political career ==
British Army military intelligence file for Thomas Hunter

In December 1918 he was elected as a Sinn Féin MP for the Cork North East constituency at the 1918 general election. Sinn Féin MPs refused to attend Westminster, and instead assembled at the Mansion House in Dublin as a revolutionary parliament called Dáil Éireann, though Hunter could not attend as he was still in prison for his supposed involvement in The German Plot.

In May 1921, Hunter was elected unopposed as a Sinn Féin Teachta Dála (TD) for the Cork East and North East constituency at the 1921 elections.

During Dáil debates on the Anglo-Irish Treaty, Hunter spoke (albeit briefly) against the treaty.

I rise to say a few words; perhaps if I did not do so some people might say that I had not the courage to voice my opinions in this assembly. I vote against this Treaty because I am a Republican; I was elected on the Republican ticket; I came here and took the oath to the Republican Government and I am not going now to destroy that Government. If the people do not agree with me they can get rid of me at any time and in any way that they like. Finally, as a Republican, I could never recognise the Government of George V of England in either internal or external association.

At the 1922 general election, Hunter stood unsuccessfully as an anti-Treaty Sinn Féin candidate.

== Civil War ==
Hunter fought on the anti-Treaty side during the Irish Civil War and served as the Quartermaster for the Cork No. 2 Brigade areas.

== Death ==
Hunter died at his farm in Glanworth, County Cork of heart disease on 11 March 1932 following a long and debilitating illness. He was survived by his widow Maire (née Kelleher), the local Primary School Principal, and their only child Conchubhair (Con) Colbert Hunter. It is supposed that his heart condition was the result of his participation in the hunger strikes.

== Legacy ==
A stretch of the N72 (Mallow Road) leading to the village of Castletownroche has been named Commandant Tom Hunter Park.

Parliament of the United Kingdom
Preceded by Tim Healy	Member of Parliament for Cork North East; 1918–1922	Constituency abolished
Oireachtas
New constituency	Teachta Dála for Cork North East; 1918–1921	Constituency abolished

Dáil	Election	Deputy (Party)	Deputy (Party)	Deputy (Party)
2nd	1921	Séamus Fitzgerald (SF)	Thomas Hunter (SF)	David Kent (SF)
3rd	1922	John Dinneen (FP)	Michael Hennessy (BP)	David Kent (AT-SF)
4th	1923	Constituency abolished. See Cork East and Cork North		
