= James Christopher Flynn =

Irish politician

James Christopher Flynn (1852 – 15 November 1922) was an Irish nationalist politician who served for 25 years as a member of the Irish Parliamentary Party in the House of Commons of what was then the United Kingdom of Great Britain and Ireland.

Flynn was elected at the 1885 general election as the Member of Parliament (MP) for North Cork, and was re-elected unopposed at the next 5 general elections. When the Irish Party split in 1891, Flynn sided with the Anti-Parnellite majority, joining the Irish National Federation. He rejoined the united party when the split was resolved in 1900. He held his seat until he stood down from the Commons at the January 1910 general election.

He argued for parliament's working hours to be altered. He was arrested under the Crimes Act in February 1888 for conspiracy.

Parliament of the United Kingdom
| New constituency | Member of Parliament for North Cork; 1885 – January 1910 | Succeeded by Patrick Guiney |
