= 3PB (1925–26) =

Melbourne, Victoria; Australia
- Broadcast area: Melbourne RA1
- Frequency: AM: 9A Melbourne

Programming
- Language: English

Ownership
- Owner: Noel Pemberton Billing

History
- First air date: September 1925
- Last air date: January 1926
- Call sign meaning: PB = Pemberton Billing

3PB was Melbourne's second B-Class radio station, opening in September 1925, after 3UZ and before 3DB. The station was originally going to be named 3WR, with WR representing "World Record Company", but that callsign was already being used by 3WR in Wangaratta, which commenced broadcasting on 1 December 1924, and has now evolved into FM station Triple M Goulburn Valley.

Most Australian B-Class stations were renamed as Commercial stations in 1930, but 3PB had closed down prior to that date. (This early station has no links whatsoever with the currently-existing 3PB which commenced in 1994 - 3PB now being the official call sign for the Melbourne outlet for ABC NewsRadio.)

The original 3PB broadcast between the hours of 8.00 and 10.00 pm, with a power of 1,500 watts.

== Noel Pemberton Billing ==
The 3PB call sign came from the initials of Noel Pemberton Billing who was a British MP and a highly controversial character in Britain and, to a lesser extent, in Australia, where he immigrated after World War I. He was particularly infamous for the libel trial known as The Black Book Case.

== Austral Duplex recordings ==
The main reason for the establishment of 3PB was so that it could broadcast Austral Duplex recordings, which were produced by Pemberton Billing in his World Record Company (Wocord) workshop in the Melbourne suburb of Brighton. The 3PB studio was attached to the Wocord premises.

Wocord recordings are believed to have been the first attempt to produce a long-playing record. The discs were eight inches (20 cm) in diameter, with a thin black shellac coating on a cardboard backing. The main problem with Wocord recordings was that they had a variable speed, commencing at 78 revolutions per minute and ending at about 30 rpm,. They required the attachment of a special device that modified the speed during playing, although even with the device recordings were sometimes a little fast or a little slow. The records also had a high degree of background noise. Not surprisingly, Wocord recordings were not popular with the general public, despite Pemberton Billing's efforts to promote them through 3PB.

== 3PB Closure ==
On account of poor Wocord record sales, 3PB closed in January 1926 after only four months on air!

== See also ==
- History of broadcasting
- History of broadcasting in Australia
- List of Australian AM radio stations
