= Georgina Frost =

Georgina 'Georgie' Frost
- Born: 29 December 1879; Sixmilebridge, County Clare, Ireland
- Died: 6 December 1939 (aged 59); Sixmilebridge, County Clare, Ireland
- Known for: first woman to hold public office in the UK and Ireland
- Father: Thomas Frost
- Relatives: Michael Kett (grandfather)

Georgina "Georgie" Frost (29 December 1879 – 6 December 1939) was an Irish court official who was the first woman to hold public office in the United Kingdom of Great Britain and Ireland.

== Early life ==
Georgina Frost was born in Sixmilebridge, County Clare, on 29 December 1879, the daughter of Margaret Kett (1847-1888) and Thomas Frost (1842–1938). Thomas Frost was the petty sessions clerk for Sixmilebridge and Newmarket-on-Fergus. Frost's maternal grandfather, Michael Kett, had held that role in Sixmilebridge in the early 1840s.

== Career and court appeals ==
In the six years immediately before Thomas Frost's retirement in 1915, Frost had assisted her father in his duties, often performing them herself. She became a well known figure in the area, travelling around by bicycle. Upon his retirement, she was appointed to succeed him by the local magistrates. At this time, however, under the Petty Sessions Clerk (Ireland) Act 1881 this appointment had to receive final approval from the Lord Lieutenant, who rejected her appointment based on her gender. The Lord Lieutenant ordered the local magistrates to appoint another person to the position, but Frost remained the only applicant. Following the objection of the Lord Lieutenant, the local magistrates granted Frost a temporary contract for one year in order to fight her case, but again this was rejected by the Lord Lieutenant.

Frost brought the case to the chancery division in Dublin, represented by Tim Healy KC and James Comyn KC. Mr Justice Dunbar Barton refused to usurp the power of the parliament in his judgement. He stated that women were not disqualified from such positions due to inability, but due to concerns around "decorum" and that the duties of the office could be "painful and exacting." He then dismissed her claim. Frost took her claim to the court of appeal before Lord Shandon, Lord Chief Justice Molony and Lord Justice Stephen Ronan. This appeal was heard in November 1917, with judgement reserved. In December 1918, when the judgement was delivered, Lord Shandon had resigned as Lord Chancellor, but left a letter instructing that the appeal was to be granted. Lord Shandon was satisfied that no statutes or supposed principles of the common law disallowed the appointment. Despite this, the other sitting judges sided with the wording of the statute which they viewed as excluding Frost from the office.

Healy discovered that a judge, Lord Shaw, was amenable to the application of the Scottish practice which allowed for an appeal to be brought in forma pauperis. In this case, Frost would incur no legal costs if she failed in her appeal. She then brought her appeal to the House of Lords for a hearing on 27 April 1920. By this point the Sex Disqualification (Removal) Act 1919 was law, and removed the legal bar to her appointment. Due to this change, the Lord Chancellor, Lord Birkenhead instead adjourned the case in order to make contact with the Lord Lieutenant so that retrospective approval could be granted to Frost. Upon the agreement of counsel, Frost was appointed in April 1920, thus making her the first woman to hold public office in the United Kingdom of Great Britain and Ireland.

Her appointment was short-lived, as in 1923 the Irish Free State abolished her job. However, those years were marked by the Irish Civil War, which saw Frost held at gunpoint by the IRA, saw the Newmarket-on-Fergus petty sessions court house destroyed, and a raid on the local RIC barracks.

Frost died on 6 December 1939 in at her home, Garna House, in Sixmilebridge.

== Commemoration ==
An Post issued a commemorative stamp of Frost in December 2000.
