= Patrick O'Keeffe (politician) =

Irish politician (1881–1973)

Teachta Dála
- In office May 1921 – June 1922
- Constituency: Cork Mid, North, South, South East and West
- In office December 1918 – May 1921
- Constituency: Cork North

Personal details
- Born: 3 July 1881 Cullen, County Cork, Ireland
- Died: 21 September 1973 (aged 92)
- Party: Sinn Féin
- Spouse: Cáit de Paor
- Children: 2

Military service
- Branch/service: Irish Volunteers
- Battles/wars: Easter Rising

Patrick O'Keeffe (Irish: Pádraig Ó Caoimh; 3 July 1881 – 21 September 1973) was an Irish politician, revolutionary and public servant.

O'Keeffe was born in the townland of Nohovaldaly, Cullen, County Cork, the son of Daniel John O'Keeffe and Bridget Sullivan. He joined the Sinn Féin party led by Arthur Griffith, where he was at one time honorary secretary. He fought in the Easter Rising in 1916 and was subsequently interned at Frongoch internment camp. He was elected as a Sinn Féin MP for the Cork North constituency at the 1918 general election. As such, he was a member of the First Dáil, though he could not attend the first meeting as he was in prison.

He was elected unopposed as a Sinn Féin Teachta Dála (TD) for the Cork Mid, North, South, South East and West constituency at the 1921 elections. He supported the Anglo-Irish Treaty and voted for it. He did not contest the 1922 general election.

He was deputy governor (and effectively in charge) of Mountjoy Prison during the Irish Civil War of 1922–1923, where he was popular with the prisoners, despite being on the opposing side. In his vivid civil war memoir, The Gates Flew Open, Peadar O'Donnell devotes a chapter to how O'Keeffe was relentlessly mocked by the prisoners who called him 'Paudeen.' He was assistant clerk of Seanad Éireann from 1938 until his retirement in 1947.

== See also ==
- List of members of the Oireachtas imprisoned during the Irish revolutionary period

Parliament of the United Kingdom
Preceded by John Guiney	Member of Parliament for Cork North; 1918–1922	Constituency abolished
Oireachtas
New constituency	Teachta Dála for Cork North; 1918–1921	Constituency abolished

Dáil	Election	Deputy (Party)	Deputy (Party)	Deputy (Party)	Deputy (Party)	Deputy (Party)	Deputy (Party)	Deputy (Party)	Deputy (Party)
2nd	1921	Seán MacSwiney (SF)	Seán Nolan (SF)	Seán Moylan (SF)	Daniel Corkery (SF)	Michael Collins (SF)	Seán Hales (SF)	Seán Hayes (SF)	Patrick O'Keeffe (SF)
3rd	1922	Michael Bradley (Lab)	Thomas Nagle (Lab)	Seán Moylan (AT-SF)	Daniel Corkery (AT-SF)	Michael Collins (PT-SF)	Seán Hales (PT-SF)	Seán Hayes (PT-SF)	Daniel Vaughan (FP)
4th	1923	Constituency abolished. See Cork North and Cork West							
