= 1921 Hertford by-election =

UK Parliamentary by-election

- 16 July 1921

| Candidate | Sueter | Carlile |
| Party | Anti-Waste League | Unionist |
| Popular vote | 12,329 | 5,553 |
| Percentage | 68.9% | 31.1% |
MP before election
Billing
Independent
Subsequent MP
Sueter
Anti-Waste League

The 1921 Hertford by-election was held on 16 July 1921. It had been necessitated by the resignation of the incumbent MP, Noel Pemberton Billing due to ill-health. The seat was gained from the Unionist Party by the Anti-Waste League.

Hertford by-election, 1921: Hertford
| Party | | Candidate | Votes | % | ±% |
|---|---|---|---|---|---|
| | Anti-Waste League | Murray Sueter | 12,329 | 68.9 | New |
| C | Unionist | Hildred Carlile | 5,553 | 31.1 | N/A |
| Majority | | | 6,776 | 37.8 | N/A |
| Turnout | | | 17,882 | 55.1 | −2.3 |
| | Anti-Waste League gain from Unionist | | Swing | | |
C indicates candidate endorsed by the coalition government.

== See also ==
- 1916 Hertford by-election
