= 1910 North East Cork by-election =

UK Parliamentary by-election

The 1910 North East Cork by-election was held on 2 March 1910. The by-election was held due to the incumbent All-for-Ireland MP, William O'Brien, also being elected to sit for Cork City. It was won by the All-for-Ireland candidate Maurice Healy, who was unopposed.
