= John Guiney (politician) =

Irish nationalist politician

John Guiney (1 October 1868 – 28 May 1931) was an Irish nationalist politician and Member of Parliament (MP) in the House of Commons of the United Kingdom of Great Britain and Ireland.

Born in Newmarket, County Cork, he was the second son of Timothy Guiney, a shopkeeper and later clerk of Kanturk poor law union, and Ellen Carver.

In the 1890s, he qualified as a solicitor and took up practice in Kanturk.

He was first elected as the All-for-Ireland League MP for the North Cork constituency at the 4 November 1913 by-election, which was held due to the death of the incumbent All-for-Ireland MP, Patrick Guiney, who was his eldest brother.

Like all All-for-Ireland League MPs, Guiney did not contest the 1918 general election as it had become evident that constitutional political concepts for attaining independent All-Ireland self-government were being displaced by Sinn Féin.

He died at his home at Egmont Place, Kanturk, County Cork, on 29 June 1931.

He was the father of David Guiney, an Irish Olympic athlete, sports journalist and historian.

He was an uncle of Philip Burton, Fine Gael TD for Cork North-East from 1961 to 1969, and member of the Seanad from 1973 to 1977.

== Notes ==
Parliament of the United Kingdom
Preceded by Patrick Guiney	Member of Parliament for North Cork; 1913 – 1918	Succeeded by Patrick O’Keeffe
