= Murray Sueter =

Royal Navy Rear Admiral (1872-1960)

Rear-Admiral Sir Murray Sueter CB
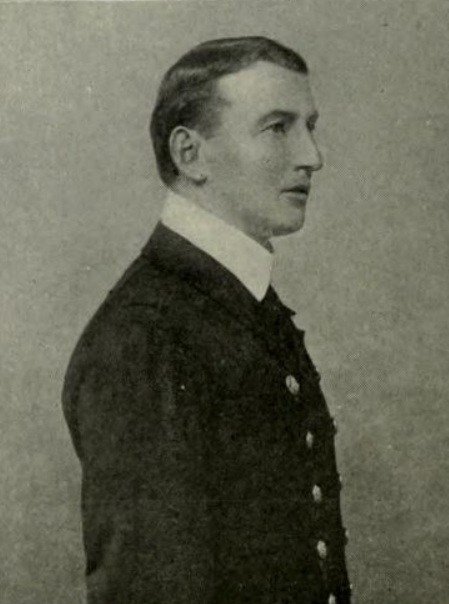
- Murray Sueter in 1915
- Born: 6 September 1872; Alverstoke, Gosport
- Died: 3 February 1960 (aged 87); Watlington, Oxfordshire
- Relatives: Sir Andrew Clarke (father-in-law)
- Military career
- Allegiance: United Kingdom
- Branch: Royal Navy
- Service years: 1886–1918 (officially retired 1920)
- Rank: Rear-Admiral
- Conflicts: World War I
- Other work: Developed Empire air mail postal services Member of Parliament; Author

Rear-Admiral Sir Murray Fraser Sueter CB (6 September 1872 – 3 February 1960) was a Royal Naval officer who was noted as a pioneer of naval aviation and later became a Member of Parliament (MP).

== Naval career ==
Sueter was born in Alverstoke. Coming from a naval background, he entered the Royal Navy as a cadet on Britannia in 1886 before serving as a midshipman with HMS Swiftsure. In 1894 he was promoted to lieutenant and in 1896 he was posted to HMS Vernon to become a specialist in torpedo warfare, afterwards serving on the staff. In 1899 he became Torpedo Officer on HMS Jupiter. In May 1902 Sueter moved to Reginald Bacon's submarine tender HMS Hazard, where he distinguished himself by aiding injured crew members of the submarine A.1 after an explosion aboard. Sueter's book, The Evolution of the Submarine Boat, Mine and Torpedo (1907), was the result of his close work with submarines during this time.

He married Andrew Clarke's daughter, Elinor Mary "Nell" de Winton, in 1903, a year before his promotion to commander (he was made a captain in 1909). Elinor Sueter died on 15 December 1948.

Murray Sueter's technical skills saw him brought into the Naval Ordnance Department of the Admiralty and in 1909 he supervised the construction of airship Mayfly, a new avenue of naval development. As inspecting captain of airships he oversaw the failure of the experiment but was nonetheless given command of the Navy's Air Department in 1912. In this role he oversaw the creation of the Royal Naval Air Service.

Sueter continued his aerial innovations during the early stages of World War I including the launching of torpedoes from aircraft and in 1915 he was promoted commodore first class and appointed superintendent of aircraft construction. He sat on the government's "Advisory Committee for Aeronautics", located at the National Physical Laboratory, under the chairmanship of Richard Glazebrook and presidency of John Strutt, Lord Rayleigh.

He promoted the use of armoured cars for the defence of airfields in France. After the stalemate of the trenches developed, the cars were sent to Russia and Egypt. His interest in the armoured car led to involvement in tank development.

In 1917, he clashed with the Admiralty and was posted to command the RNAS in Italy. While in Italy, Sueter sent a letter to King George which incurred the displeasure of the Sea Lords and he was relieved of command. He was given no work from 1918 to 1920 when he was retired as a rear-admiral.

After his naval service he worked with airmail provision and published a number of books, notably Airmen or Noahs (1928) an autobiography and critique of current naval practices and The Evolution of the Tank (1937). He was knighted in 1934.

== Politics ==
After his naval service Sueter entered politics as a member of the Anti-Waste League and was co-sponsored by them and the Independent Parliamentary Group for the 1921 Hertford by-election which he won. He went on to join the Conservative Party and contested the 1923 general election for them, winning election in Hertford. He went on to hold the seat until his retirement in 1945. During the 1930s he was one of a number of Members of Parliament to become active in the Anglo-German Fellowship. Along with several other members of the group, including a number of parliamentarians, he accepted an invitation from Joachim von Ribbentrop to attend the 1936 Nuremberg Rally. He died in Watlington, Oxfordshire.

== See also ==
- John Cyril Porte
- John Lankester Parker
- Pedrail Machine

Military offices
New title Department established from the aviation responsibilities of C-in-C the Nore	Director of the Admiralty Air Department; 1912 – 1915	Succeeded by C L Vaughan-Lee; As Director of the Air Service
Parliament of the United Kingdom
Preceded by Noel Pemberton Billing	Member of Parliament for Hertford; 1921–1945	Succeeded by Derek Walker-Smith
