= 1913 North Cork by-election =

UK Parliamentary by-election

The 1913 North Cork by-election was held on 4 November 1913. The by-election was held due to the death of the incumbent All-for-Ireland MP, Patrick Guiney. It was won by his brother John Guiney, the All-for-Ireland candidate, who was returned unopposed.
