= North East Cork (UK Parliament constituency) =

UK parliamentary constituency in Ireland, 1885–1922

- Former county constituency for the House of Commons

1885–1922
- Seats: 1
- Created from: County Cork and Mallow
- Replaced by: Cork East and North East

North East Cork, a division of County Cork, was a parliamentary constituency in Ireland, represented in the Parliament of the United Kingdom. From 1885 to 1922 it returned one Member of Parliament (MP) to the House of Commons of the United Kingdom of Great Britain and Ireland.

Until the 1885 general election the area was part of the County Cork constituency. From 1922, on the establishment of the Irish Free State, it was not represented in the UK Parliament.

== Boundaries ==
This constituency comprised the north-eastern part of County Cork, consisting of the baronies of Condons and Clangibbon and Kinnatalloon, that part of the barony of Fermoy not contained within the constituency of North Cork, that part of the barony of Barrymore contained within the parishes of Ardnageehy, Britway, Castlelyons, Coole, Dunbulloge, Gortroe, Kilshanahan, Knockmourne, Rathcormack, Templebodan and Whitechurch, and that part of the barony of Barretts contained within the parish of Mourne Abbey.

== Members of Parliament ==
Year	Member	Party
1885	Edmund Leamy	Irish Parliamentary Party
1887	William O'Brien	Irish Parliamentary Party
1891	William O'Brien	Irish National Federation
February 1893	Michael Davitt	Irish National Federation
June 1893	William Abraham	Irish National Federation
1900	William Abraham	Irish Parliamentary Party
January 1910	William O'Brien	All-for-Ireland League
March 1910	Maurice Healy	All-for-Ireland League
December 1910	Moreton Frewen	All-for-Ireland League
1911	Tim Healy	All-for-Ireland League
1918	Thomas Hunter	Sinn Féin
1922	constituency abolished	

== Elections ==
=== Elections in the 1880s ===
General election 28 November 1885: Cork North-East
Party	Candidate	Votes	%	±%
Irish Parliamentary	Edmund Leamy	Unopposed		
Registered electors		8,175		
Irish Parliamentary win (new seat)				

General election 7 July 1886: Cork North-East
Party	Candidate	Votes	%	±%
Irish Parliamentary	Edmund Leamy	Unopposed		
Registered electors		8,175		
Irish Parliamentary hold				

- Leamy resigns

By-election 16 May 1887: Cork North-East
Party	Candidate	Votes	%	±%
Irish Parliamentary	William O'Brien	Unopposed		
Registered electors		8,812		
Irish Parliamentary hold				

=== Elections in the 1890s ===
General election 7 July 1892: Cork North-East
Party	Candidate	Votes	%	±%
Irish National Federation	William O'Brien	Unopposed		
Registered electors		8,781		
Irish National Federation gain from Irish Parliamentary				

In the 1892 United Kingdom general election William O'Brien (Irish Parliamentary Party) was returned for both North East Cork and Cork City. He chose to sit for Cork City, and a by-election was held for the vacant seat.

By-election 8 February 1893: Cork North-East
Party	Candidate	Votes	%	±%
Irish National Federation	Michael Davitt	Unopposed		
Registered electors		8,790		
Irish National Federation hold				

Being the only nominated candidate in the by-election, Michael Davitt took the seat unopposed on 8 February 1893. He resigned in May (after being threatened with bankruptcy) and a further by-election was held for which William Abraham was returned unopposed on 28 June.

By-election 28 June 1893: Cork North-East
Party	Candidate	Votes	%	±%
Irish National Federation	William Abraham	Unopposed		
Registered electors		8,790		
Irish National Federation hold				

General election 18 July 1895: Cork North-East
Party	Candidate	Votes	%	±%
Irish National Federation	William Abraham	Unopposed		
Registered electors		8,356		
Irish National Federation hold				

=== Elections in the 1900s ===
General election 4 October 1900: Cork North-East
Party	Candidate	Votes	%	±%
Irish Parliamentary	William Abraham	Unopposed		
Registered electors		7,393		
Irish Parliamentary hold				

General election 18 January 1906: Cork North-East
Party	Candidate	Votes	%	±%
Irish Parliamentary	William Abraham	Unopposed		
Registered electors		6,497		
Irish Parliamentary hold				

=== Elections in the 1910s ===
General election 27 January 1910: Cork North-East
Party	Candidate	Votes	%	±%
All-for-Ireland	William O'Brien	2,984	66.4	N/A
Irish Parliamentary	William Abraham	1,510	33.6	N/A
Majority		1,474	32.8	N/A
Turnout		4,494	67.7	N/A
Registered electors		6,634		
All-for-Ireland gain from Irish Parliamentary		Swing	N/A	

In the January 1910 general election William O'Brien (All-for-Ireland League) was again returned for both North East Cork and Cork City. As usual, he chose to sit for Cork City, and a by-election was held for the vacant seat, which was taken unopposed by Maurice Healy (All-for-Ireland League) on 2 March 1910.

By-election 2 March 1910: Cork North-East
Party	Candidate	Votes	%	±%
All-for-Ireland	Maurice Healy	Unopposed		
Registered electors		6,634		
All-for-Ireland hold				

General election 8 December 1910: Cork North-East
Party	Candidate	Votes	%	±%
All-for-Ireland	Moreton Frewen	Unopposed		
Registered electors		6,634		
All-for-Ireland hold				

In the December 1910 general election North East Cork was won by Moreton Frewen (All-for-Ireland League) but his senior party colleague Tim Healy lost in North Louth. Frewen resigned so that Healy could stand in his vacated seat, and Healy was returned unopposed in the by-election on 16 July 1911.

By-election 15 July 1911: Cork North-East
Party	Candidate	Votes	%	±%
All-for-Ireland	Tim Healy	Unopposed		
Registered electors		6,670		
All-for-Ireland hold				

General Election 14 December 1918: Cork North-East
Party	Candidate	Votes	%	±%
Sinn Féin	Thomas Hunter	Unopposed		
Registered electors		18,239		
Sinn Féin gain from All-for-Ireland				
