= Patrick Guiney =

Irish Nationalist politician, agrarian agitator and Member of Parliament

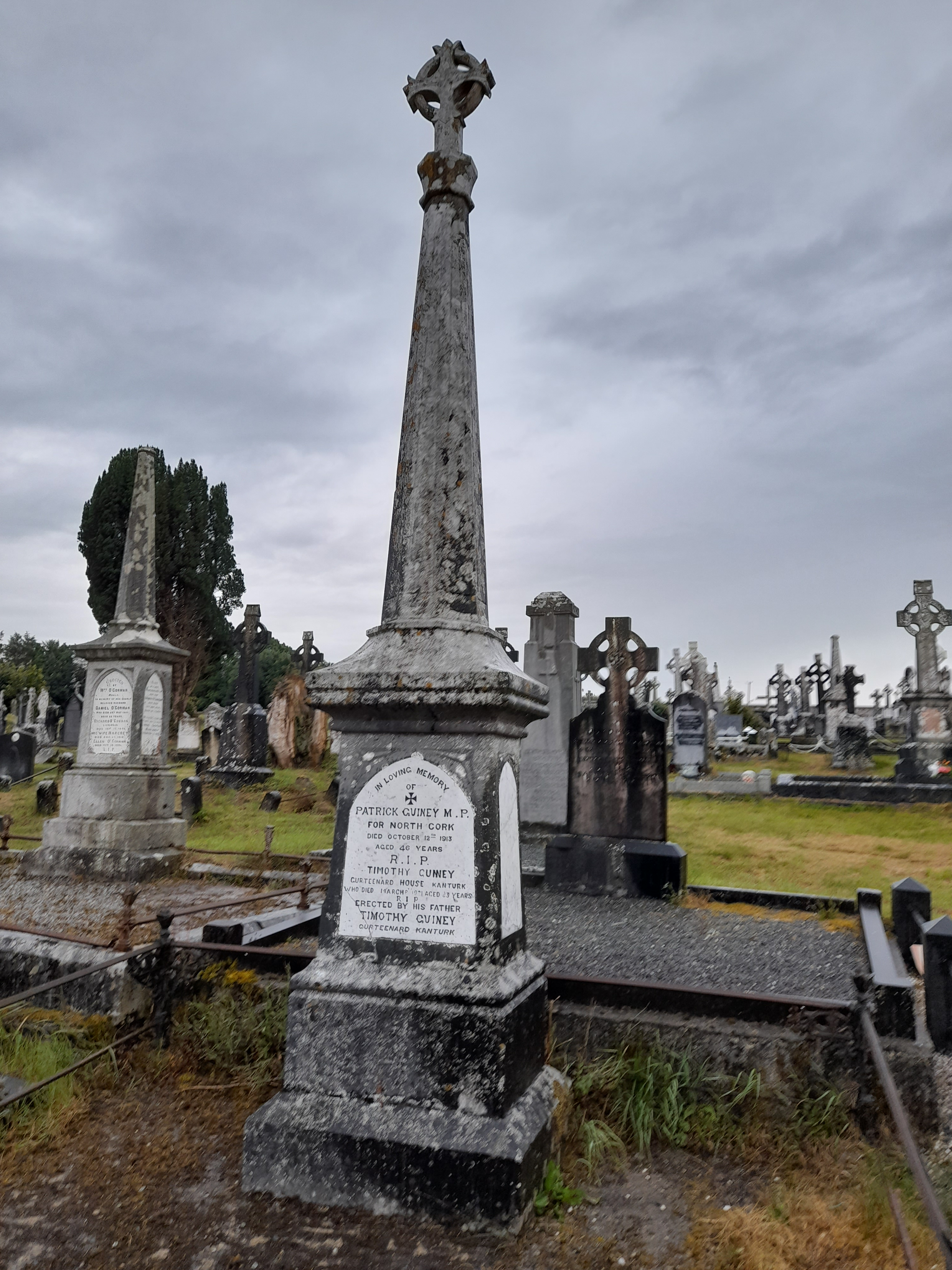
Headstone in Clonfert Cemetery, Newmarket, County Cork, Ireland.

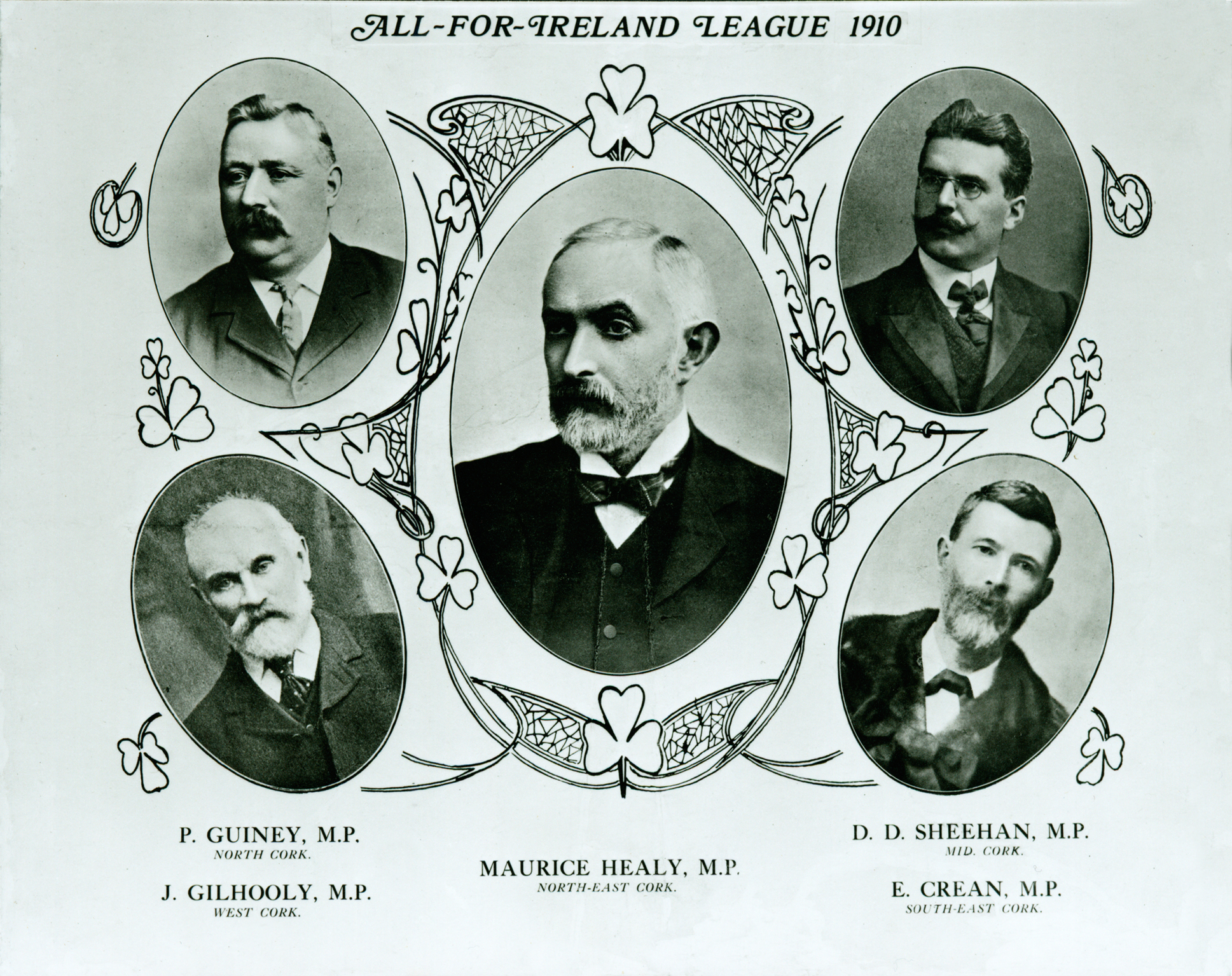
All-for-Ireland League group portrait of five of its Members of Parliament, in the "Cork Free Press", 30 July 1910. These are: Patrick Guiney (North Cork), James Gilhooly (West Cork), Maurice Healy (North East Cork), D. D. Sheehan (Mid Cork), and Eugene Crean (South East Cork).

Patrick Guiney (16 March 1867 – 12 October 1913) was an Irish Nationalist politician, agrarian agitator and Member of Parliament (MP) in the House of Commons of the United Kingdom of Great Britain and Ireland.

Born in Newmarket, County Cork, he was the eldest son of Timothy Guiney, a shopkeeper and later clerk of Kanturk poor law union, and Ellen Carver. He was educated at St. Patrick's Monastery, Mountrath, County Laois. He served three terms of imprisonment for activity in the Land War and later Plan of Campaign movement during the 1880s under the Coercion Act. He became a farmer and served as councillor for Newmarket and on Cork County Council (1908–1911) as well as Chair of Newmarket Agricultural Society, Newmarket Gaelic League and Newmarket Old-Age Pensions Committee.

With strong family connection in the North Cork area, Guiney had built a personal political base as a Land and Labour Association activist, skilled in organising land agitation and deploying it at a local level to make landlords agree sales terms under the Land Purchase (Ireland) Act 1903. A supporter of William O'Brien's All-for-Ireland League, he was elected MP for North Cork in the January 1910 general election. He was re-elected in the following December 1910 general election, when he also contested (unsuccessfully) for Kerry East.

He married Nanette O'Connor of Ballyclough, Mallow, in 1895.

He died at his home in Newmarket on 12 October 1913 after contracting pneumonia and was buried in Clonfert Cemetery, Newmarket.

His brother John Guiney, a solicitor in Kanturk, was returned unopposed for his seat in the resulting by-election. Patrick and John were uncles of Philip Burton, Fine Gael TD for Cork North-East from 1961 to 1969, and member of the Seanad from 1973 to 1977.

== Notes ==
Parliament of the United Kingdom
Preceded by James Christopher Flynn	Member of Parliament for North Cork; January 1910 – 1913	Succeeded by John Guiney
