= 1911 North East Cork by-election =

UK Parliamentary by-election

The 1911 North East Cork by-election was held on 15 July 1911. The by-election was held due to the resignation of the incumbent All-for-Ireland MP, Moreton Frewen. Frewen resigned in order for Tim Healy, who was prominent in the All-for-Ireland League but who had lost his seat in North Louth in the previous general election, to take his seat. Healy was unopposed and held the seat.
