= Noel Pemberton Billing =

British aviator, inventor, publisher, and MP (1881–1948)

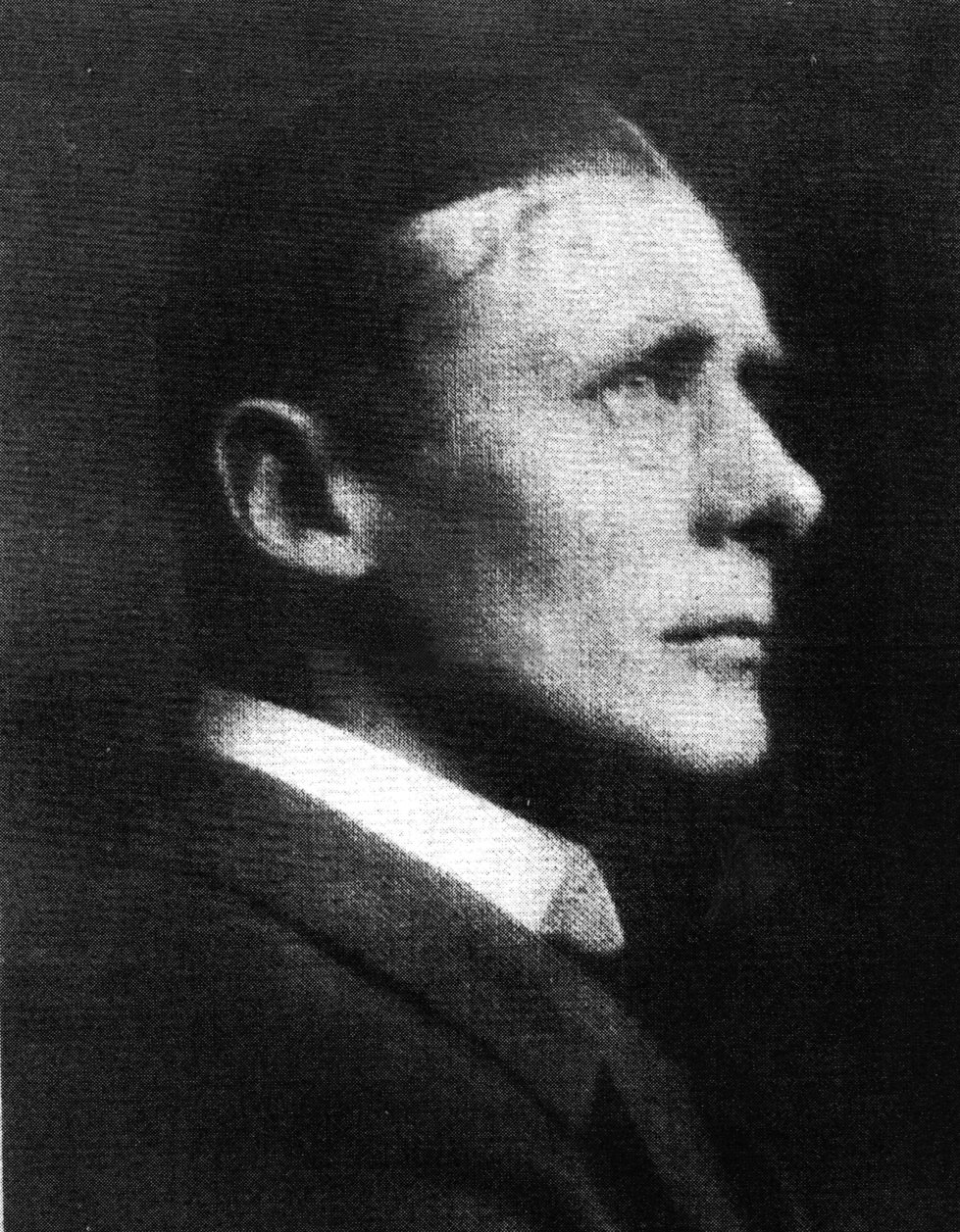

Member of Parliament for Hertford
- In office 9 March 1916 – 16 July 1921
- Preceded by: John Rolleston
- Succeeded by: Murray Sueter

Personal details
- Born: Noel Billing; 31 January 1881 Hampstead, London
- Died: 11 November 1948 (aged 67)
- Party: Independent
- Profession: Politician, aviator

Noel Pemberton Billing (31 January 1881 – 11 November 1948), sometimes known as Noel Pemberton-Billing, was a British aviator, inventor, publisher and Member of Parliament for Hertford. He founded the firm that became Supermarine and promoted air power, and held a strong antipathy towards the Royal Aircraft Factory and its products. He was noted during the First World War for his populist views and for a sensational libel trial.

== Early life and education ==
Noel Billing was born in Hampstead, North London, youngest son of Charles Eardley Billing, a Birmingham iron-founder, and Annie Emilia, née Claridge. He was educated at the high school at Hampstead, at Cumming's College, outside Boulogne, at Westcliff College, Ramsgate, and at Craven College, Highgate.

== Career ==
Billing ran away from home at the age of 13 and travelled to South Africa. After trying a number of occupations, he joined the mounted police and became a boxer. He was also an actor when he took the extra name Pemberton. He fought in the Second Boer War, and was at the Relief of Ladysmith, but was later invalided out.

Billing returned to Britain in 1903 and used his savings to open a garage in Kingston upon Thames. This was successful, but he became more interested in aviation, which was then in its infancy. An attempt to open an aerodrome in Essex failed, so he started a short-lived career in property, while studying to become a lawyer. He passed his exams, but instead moved into selling steam yachts. Convinced of the potential of powered aviation, he founded a flying field with extensive facilities on reclaimed marshland at Fambridge in Essex in 1909, but this ambitious venture did not prosper, British aviation activity becoming centred at Brooklands. In 1913, he bet Frederick Handley Page that he could earn his pilot's licence within 24 hours of first sitting in an aircraft. He won his bet, gaining licence number 683 and £500, equivalent to more than £28,000 in 2010, which he used to found an aircraft business, Pemberton-Billing Ltd, with Hubert Scott-Paine as works manager, in 1913. Billing registered the telegraphic address Supermarine, Southampton for the company, which soon acquired premises at Oakbank Wharf in Woolston, Southampton, and started construction of his flying boat designs. Financial difficulties soon set in, but the onset of the First World War revived the fortunes of the business.

In 1914, Billing joined the Royal Naval Air Service and in October was granted a temporary commission as a lieutenant. He was involved in the air raid on Zeppelin sheds near Lake Constance made in November 1914. He was able to sell his share in the aviation firm to Scott-Paine in early 1916, who renamed the firm Supermarine Aviation Works Limited after the company's telegraphic address.

== Politics ==
=== Parliament ===
As a man of means, Billing contested the Mile End by-election in 1916 as an independent candidate, but was not successful. He then contested and won the March 1916 by-election in Hertford.

In parliament, Billing consistently advocated the creation of an air force, retaliation against German air raids, that action be taken against war profiteering and that action be taken to lessen the influence of Germans in Britain. In asking awkward questions of the government he was usually supported by Arthur Lynch.

In 1917, after an altercation in parliament, Noel Pemberton Billing offered Martin Archer-Shee MP a duel by boxing in public for charity, but Archer-Shee declined.

Following a disagreement over parliamentary procedure and with Billing refusing to sit down while "Germans are running about this country", Billing was ejected from the House of Commons and suspended as an MP on 1 July 1918. Because Billing refused to leave the chamber even after the House had voted to suspend him, and the Serjeant at Arms had then asked him to leave, he was automatically suspended for the rest of that parliamentary session, rather than the usual five days.

At the 1918 general election, he was one of the few candidates to beat a Coalition Coupon candidate and he doubled his majority.

He resigned his seat in 1921 by accepting the Stewardship of the Manor of Northstead, citing that the House of Commons had been rendered "unwholesome and unfair" by Lloyd George "at the instigation of a camarilla of International financiers".

=== Advocacy of air power ===
During the First World War, he was notable for his support of air power, constantly accusing the government of neglecting the issue and advocating the creation of a separate air force, unattached to either the British Army or the Royal Navy. During the so-called "Fokker scourge" of late 1915 and early 1916, he became particularly vocal against the Royal Aircraft Factory and its products, raising the question in typically exaggerated terms once he entered parliament. His prejudice against the Factory and its products persisted, and was very influential. He called for air raids against German cities. In 1917, he published Air War and How to Wage it, which emphasised the future role of raids on cities and the need to develop protective measures. His own eccentric quadraplane design for a home defence fighter, the heavily armed and searchlight-equipped "Supermarine Nighthawk", was built in prototype but had insufficient performance to be of any use against Zeppelins.

=== Publishing and libel trial ===
In late 1916, Billing founded and edited a weekly journal, The Imperialist. The journal supported his parliamentary campaigns, also advocating equal voting rights for men and women and electoral reform. The journal was renamed Vigilante in 1918 to reflect his campaign for a Vigilance Committee.

In 1918, Captain Harold Sherwood Spencer became assistant editor and the journal was increasingly left in Spencer's hands. John Henry Clarke and Henry Hamilton Beamish began to write for Vigilante, and promoted antisemitic conspiracy theories, claiming "the British war effort was being undermined by the "hidden hand" of German sympathisers and German Jews operating in Britain". The journal included attacks on "Jews, German music, Pacifism, Fabianism, Aliens, Financiers, Internationalism, and the Brotherhood of Man".

The journal's most famous articles were largely written by Spencer, but under Billing's name, in which it was claimed that the Germans were blackmailing "47,000 highly placed British perverts" to "propagate evils which all decent men thought had perished in Sodom and Lesbia". The names were said to be inscribed in the "Berlin Black Book" of the Mbret of Albania. The contents of this book revealed that the Germans planned on "exterminating the manhood of Britain" by luring men into homosexuality and paedophilia. "Even to loiter in the streets was not immune. Meretricious agents of the Kaiser were stationed at such places as Marble Arch and Hyde Park Corner. In this black book of sin details were given of the unnatural defloration of children ... wives of men in supreme positions were entangled. In Lesbian ecstasy the most sacred secrets of the state were threatened." He publicly attacked Margot Asquith, the wife of the prime minister, hinting that she was caught up in this. He also targeted members of the circle around Robbie Ross, the literary executor of Oscar Wilde, who supported and introduced homosexual poets and writers.

He published an article, "The Cult of the Clitoris", which implied that the actress Maud Allan, then appearing in a private production of Salome organised by Ross, was a lesbian associate of the conspirators. This led to a sensational libel case, at which Billing represented himself and won. Lord Alfred Douglas, a former lover of Oscar Wilde, testified in Billing's favour, as did Billing's mistress Eileen Villiers-Stuart. Villiers-Stuart claimed to have seen the "Black Book" and even asserted in court that the judge, Charles Darling, was in the book.

Billing's victory in this case created significant popular publicity. He later indicated he had never believed such a book existed, but that the whole matter had been "to frighten off those in prominent positions whose sexual tastes could have led to them being blackmailed by German agents". Michael Kettle in his book, Salome's Last Veil: The Libel Case of the Century, claimed that the Maud Allan libel case was part of a plot by generals to stop Lloyd George from making an early peace with Germany.

=== Vigilance Committee ===
While air power was his main overarching concern Pemberton Billing's primary political campaign was for the establishment of a committee of nine Independent politicians who would watch over the government in the House of Commons. He was highly critical of party politics believing it was a "disease" which made all governments "corrupt". The name was explicitly in reference to the San Francisco Committee of Vigilance.

He then created a Vigilance Society to stand in the elections. The society was disbanded in 1919 as Billing became disillusioned with Spencer, Beamish and Clarke.

== Inter-war years ==
Following the Russian Revolution, Billing began to express strong anti-communist viewpoints, and, in 1919, he supported British military intervention against the Bolsheviks in Russia.

After the war, he suffered increasingly from health problems, which contributed to his temporary retirement from politics in 1921. He dramatically resigned his seat in Parliament, urging his constituents not to vote in the consequent by-election. However, he continued to remain active writing literary works and producing films. In 1927, Billing wrote a play, High Treason, inspired by Fritz Lang's film Metropolis. It was a science-fiction drama about pacifism set in a future 1940 (later changed to 1950), when a "United States of Europe" comes into conflict with the "Empire of the Atlantic States". In 1929, Maurice Elvey made a film of the play, using the same title. It was released in two versions, one silent and the other an early "talkie", but neither proved successful.

He stood again for Hertford in the 1929 general election, coming second. In 1938, he registered his protest against Neville Chamberlain's Munich Agreement in a booklet.

== Australia ==
Billing emigrated to Australia after the First World War.

It was in Australia that he patented a recording system intended to produce laterally-cut disc records with ten times the capacity of existing systems. Billing's "World Record Controller" fitted onto a standard spring-wound gramophone, using a progressive gearing system to initially slow the turntable speed from 78 rpm to 33 rpm and then gradually increase rotational speed of the record as it played, so that the linear speed at which the recorded groove passed the needle remained constant. That allowed over ten minutes playing time per 12-inch side of the records, but the high cost of the long-playing discs (10 shillings apiece), the fact that the speed varied, and the complexity of the playback attachment, prevented popular acceptance.

In 1923, Billing set up a disc recording plant under the name World Record (Australia) Limited. The plant was in Bay Street Brighton, a suburb of Melbourne, from where he produced his 78 rpm to 33 rpm discs. The plant was also the base for radio station 3PB, which he established in August 1925 for the purpose of broadcasting the company’s recordings. It was a limited "manufacturers' licence", a type which was only available during the first few years of wireless broadcasting in Australia. 3PB was only on the air for four months.

The first recording made by World Record (Australia) was released in July 1925, and featured Bert Ralton’s Havana Band, then performing at the Esplanade Hotel in the Melbourne suburb of St Kilda.

== Other inventions ==
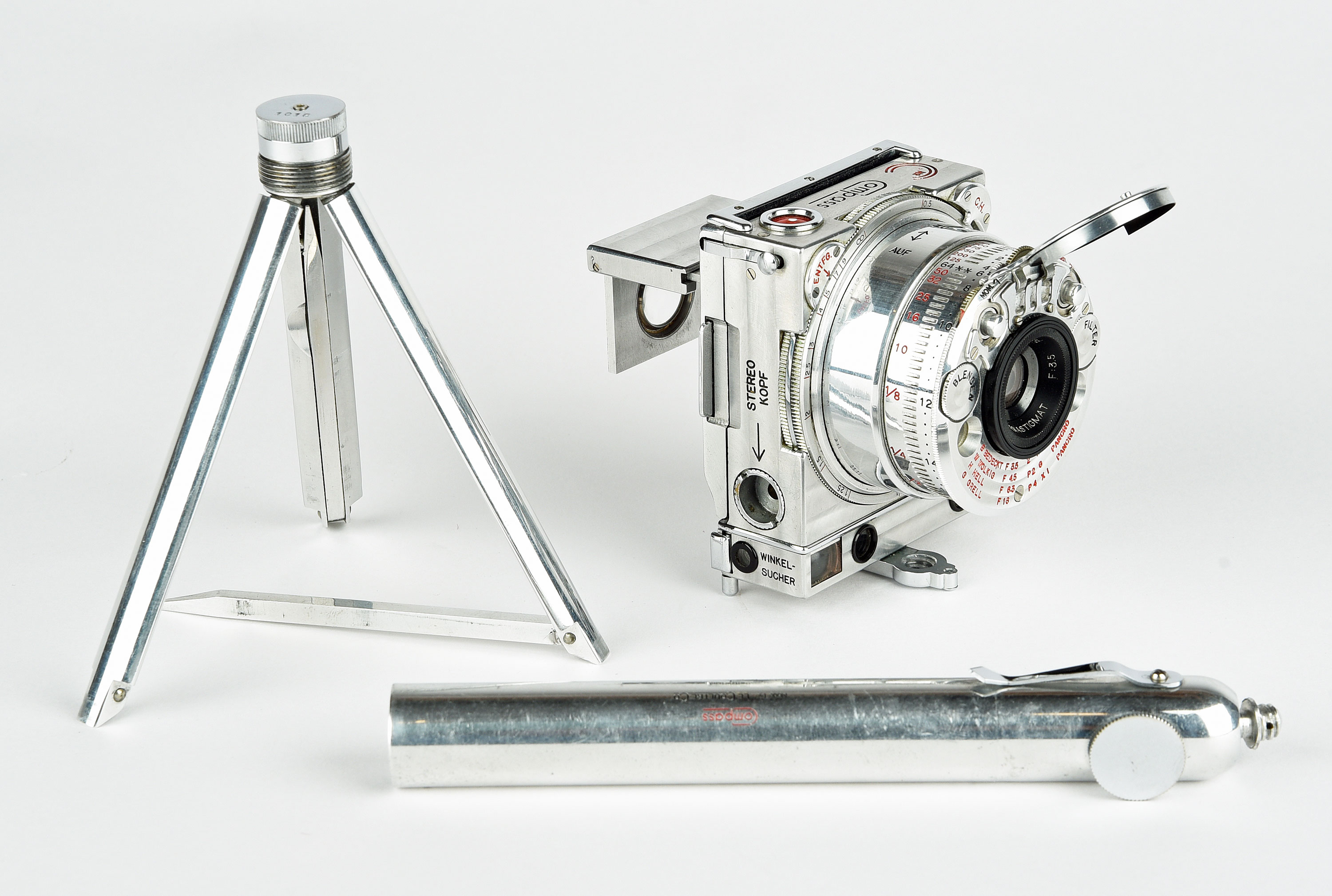
LeCoultre Compass

A further musical invention, the "Duophone" unbreakable record, appeared in 1925, but was discontinued in 1930 as its material rapidly wore out needles and most Duophone recordings were made by the obsolete acoustical process.

In 1936, Billing designed the miniature LeCoultre Compass camera. In 1948, he devised the "Phantom" camera to be used by spies. It never entered production, but its rarity led one to sell for £120,000, a record price for any camera, in 2001.

Shortly before the Second World War, Billing claimed to have invented an uncrewed flying bomb, but the design was not pursued.

== Second World War ==
In 1941, Billing attempted to return to politics, seeking to replicate his success during the First World War as a critic of the conduct of the war. He advocated the defeat of Germany by bombing alone, and the defence of Britain by a system of spaced light-beams directed upwards, which would confuse enemy bombers. Billing also proposed a post-war reform of the British constitution, arguing that general elections should be abolished in favour of a rolling programme of by-elections and that a new second chamber should be created, appointed from representatives of trades and professions. He also argued that there should be a separate "Women's parliament" dedicated to "domestic" matters. He stood in four by-elections, most notably in Hornsey in 1941, but he was unable to win a seat in parliament at any of them.

== Personal life ==
In 1903, Billing married Lilian Maud (died 1923), daughter of Theodore Henry Schweitzer, of Bristol; they had no children. Billing died on 11 November 1948 at the age of 67, aboard his motor-yacht, Commodore, at The Quay, Burnham-on-Crouch, Essex.

== Representations in literature ==
The novelist Pat Barker's award-winning First World War trilogy – Regeneration, The Eye in the Door and The Ghost Road – was set against the backdrop of Billing's libel case, with several characters mentioning his ominous black book. The middle novel, in particular, deals with the psychiatric treatment of soldiers torn between patriotism and pacifism, and between homosexuality and heterosexuality.

Billing and the libel case brought by Maud Allan are also discussed in After Sappho by Selby Wynn Schwartz - “We feared that Noel Pemberton Billing and his ilk had destroyed half a century of our careful becoming. We had not foreseen that a hysterical mob might drag us back to the years when X was imprisoned in an asylum and Rina Faccio sentenced to marriage under Article 554. We were plunged back into a history we had barely survived the first time.”

Parliament of the United Kingdom
Preceded by Sir John Fowke Lancelot Rolleston	Member of Parliament for Hertford; 1916–1921	Succeeded by Murray Sueter
