= Moreton Frewen =

British politician (1853–1924)

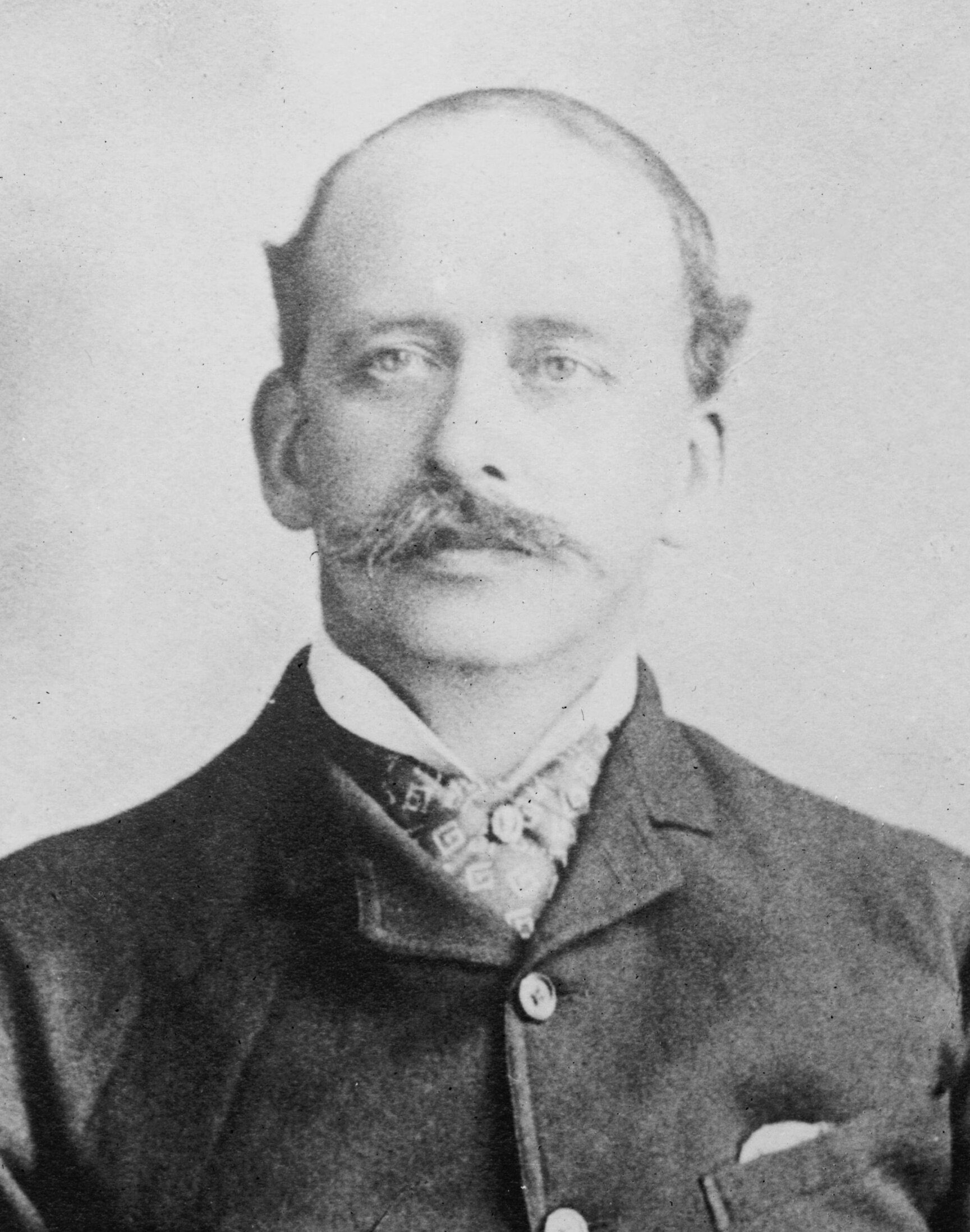

Member of Parliament for North East Cork
- In office December 1910 – July 1911
- Preceded by: Maurice Healy
- Succeeded by: Tim Healy

Personal details
- Born: Moreton Frewen; 8 May 1853 Northiam, Sussex, England
- Died: 2 September 1924 (aged 71) Brede, Sussex, England
- Spouse: Clara Jerome (m. 1881)
- Children: 3, including Clare Sheridan
- Education: Trinity College, Cambridge

Moreton Frewen (8 May 1853 – 2 September 1924), nicknamed "Mortal Ruin", was a British entrepreneur and writer on monetary reform, who served briefly as a Member of Parliament (MP).

== Early life ==
Frewen was born on 8 May 1853 at Brickwall House, Northiam, East Sussex. He was the third son of Thomas Frewen (1811–1870), MP for South Leicestershire, and Helen Louisa Homan (1821–1901).

He was privately educated by tutors, before going up to Trinity College, Cambridge, where he gained his BA in 1877.

== Career ==
Frewen was a charming adventurer from an old Sussex landed gentry family. He was known as a fine shot, often invited to shoot at Sandringham by the Prince of Wales, the future Edward VII; a good horseman who taught Lillie Langtry to ride; and a keen fisherman. He gambled most of his inheritance on a two-horse race, declaring he would go to America if he lost - which he did.

He journeyed to Wyoming during the cattle boom in the 1870s and 1880s. He founded an enormous ranch at Kaycee in Wyoming, where he built the first two-storey building in the state. There he established the Frewen Brothers Cattle Company, which later went public as the Powder River Cattle Company Ltd. During his stay from 1879–1886 and, later, his many visits to America, he shook hands with every president from Ulysses Grant to Theodore Roosevelt in the White House. He met and married an American heiress, Clara Jerome in New York. They returned together to the Wyoming ranch but then Clara miscarried a child and she never returned to the euphemistically named Castle Frewen. Her husband, together with his brother Richard, soldiered on until the catastrophically cold winter of 1885-1886 wiped out his herd: the cattle died of thirst, being unable to break the ice in the rivers and lakes.

Moreton's brother-in-law Lord Randolph Churchill, Winston's father, recommended him to the Nizam of Hyderabad, then the world's richest man, to sort out the corruption and theft in his court. Moreton spent two years there from 1887-1889 and succeeded in re-organising the Nizam's finances whilst routing out the miscreants. He left with the Nizam's thanks, having made many friends, including Salar Jung II, the Prime Minister of Hyderabad State, for whom he found a wife in Constantinople.

Returning to the United Kingdom, where he owned homes in London and Innishannon in County Cork (then part of United Kingdom of Great Britain and Ireland), Frewen served as Vice President of the Imperial Federation League. He wrote on tariff reform and other economic matters and was an advocate of bimetallism.

Frewen, of an Anglo-Irish background, became involved in Irish affairs through inheriting the 3,000 acres Innishannon estate from his brother Richard, who was drowned at sea; and through his friendships with Lord Dunraven and Tim Healy (MP). He was a magistrate (JP) for County Galway and County Cork.

=== Member of Parliament ===
Frewen was elected unopposed at the December 1910 general election as an All-for-Ireland League MP for North East Cork, taking his seat in the House of Commons of the United Kingdom of Great Britain and Ireland. He resigned on 5 July 1911 because his seat was needed for Healy and because of his reactionary public statements: his opposition to the Parliament Bill to remove the legislative veto of the House of Lords was proving a political liability. Later he signed the British Covenant in support of Ulster, while continuing to engage in political intrigues.

== Personal life ==
In 1881, he married Clara Jerome (1851–1935), daughter of the wealthy American financier Leonard Jerome, and sister to Lord Randolph Churchill's wife Jennie. He was therefore an uncle (by marriage) to Winston Churchill.

Together, Moreton and Clara were the parents of two sons and a daughter:

- Capt. Hugh Moreton Frewen (1883–1967), married Donna Maria Nunziante, daughter of the Duke of Mignano.
- Capt. Oswald Moreton Frewen RN (1887–1958)
- Clare Consuelo Frewen (1885–1970), married Wilfred Sheridan, grandson of Richard Brinsley Sheridan.

Frewen died on 2 September 1924 at his residence Brede Place, Brede, East Sussex.

== Works ==
- American Competition, Chapman & Hall, 1885 (2nd ed.)
- The Economic Crisis, Kegan Paul, Trench & Co., 1888
- The Problem of the Unemployed and the Crisis in Eastern Exchange, Hazell, Watson & Co., 1908
- A Memorandum on the Finance of the Great War, Spottiswoode & Co., 1915
- Melton Mowbray, and Other Memories, Herbert Jenkins, 1924

== In popular culture ==
- Frewen figures prominently in the novel Mortal Ruin by John Malcolm.

== See also ==
- List of United Kingdom MPs with the shortest service

Parliament of the United Kingdom
Preceded by Maurice Healy	Member of Parliament for North East Cork; December 1910 – July 1911	Succeeded by Tim Healy
