= 1916 Hertford by-election =

UK parliamentary by-election

The 1916 Hertford by-election was held on 9 March 1916. The by-election was held due to the resignation of the incumbent Conservative MP, Sir John Rolleston. It was won by the Independent candidate Noel Pemberton Billing.

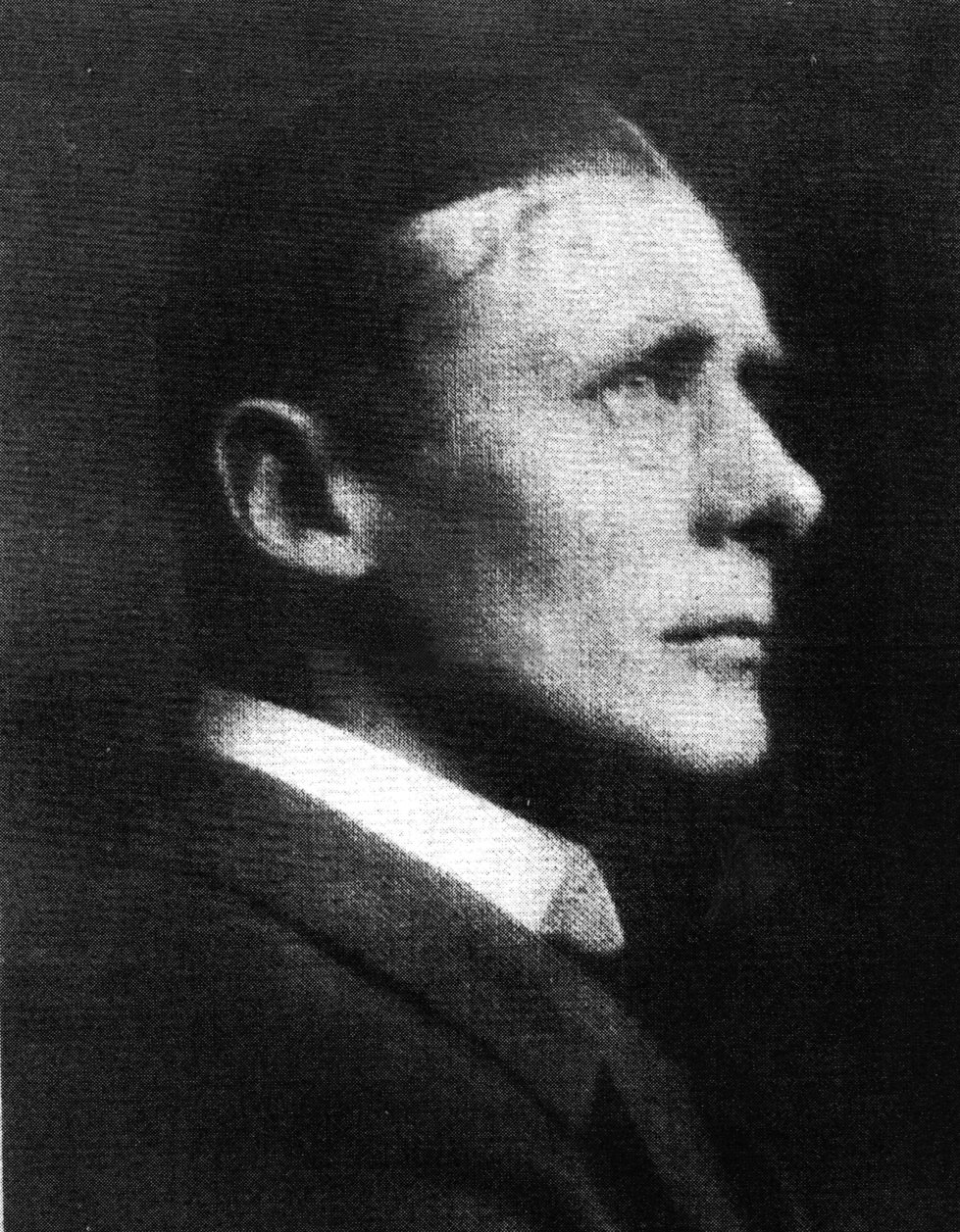
Billing

Hertford by-election, 1916
Party	Candidate	Votes	%	±%
Independent	Noel Pemberton Billing	4,590	56.3	New
Conservative	Brodie Henderson	3,559	43.7	−13.3
Majority		1,031	12.6	N/A
Turnout		8,149	64.2	−18.8
Independent gain from Conservative		Swing		

== See also ==
- 1921 Hertford by-election
