= North Cork (UK Parliament constituency) =

UK parliamentary constituency in Ireland, 1885–1922

- Former county constituency for the House of Commons

1885–1922
- Seats: 1
- Created from: County Cork
- Replaced by: Cork Mid, North, South, South East and West

North Cork, a division of County Cork, was a parliamentary constituency in Ireland, represented in the Parliament of the United Kingdom. From 1885 to 1922 it returned one Member of Parliament (MP) to the House of Commons of the United Kingdom of Great Britain and Ireland.

Until the 1885 general election the area was part of the County Cork constituency. From 1922 it was not represented in the UK Parliament, as it was no longer in the UK.

== Boundaries ==
This constituency comprised the northern part of County Cork, consisting of the baronies of Duhallow, Orrery and Kilmore and that part of the barony of Fermoy contained within the parishes of Ardskeagh, Ballyhay, Doneraile and Imphrick, and the townland of Ballylopen in the parish of Kilquane.

== Members of Parliament ==
Election	Member	Party
1885	James Christopher Flynn	Irish Parliamentary Party
1891	James Christopher Flynn	Irish National Federation
1900	James Christopher Flynn	Irish Parliamentary Party
January 1910	Patrick Guiney	All-for-Ireland League
1913	John Guiney	All-for-Ireland League
1918	Patrick O'Keeffe	Sinn Féin
1922	constituency abolished	

== Elections ==
=== Elections in the 1880s ===
1885 general election: North Cork
Party	Candidate	Votes	%	±%
Irish Parliamentary	James Christopher Flynn	4,982	98.0	
Independent	Thomas Walsh	102	2.0	
Majority		4,880	96.0	
Turnout		5,084	65.0	
Registered electors		7,827		
Irish Parliamentary win (new seat)				

1886 general election: North Cork
Party	Candidate	Votes	%	±%
Irish Parliamentary	James Christopher Flynn	Unopposed		
Irish Parliamentary hold				

=== Elections in the 1890s ===
1892 general election: North Cork
Party	Candidate	Votes	%	±%
Irish National Federation	James Christopher Flynn	Unopposed		
Irish National Federation gain from Irish Parliamentary				

1895 general election: North Cork
Party	Candidate	Votes	%	±%
Irish National Federation	James Christopher Flynn	Unopposed		
Irish National Federation hold				

=== Elections in the 1900s ===
1900 general election: North Cork
Party	Candidate	Votes	%	±%
Irish Parliamentary	James Christopher Flynn	Unopposed		
Irish Parliamentary hold				

1906 general election: North Cork
Party	Candidate	Votes	%	±%
Irish Parliamentary	James Christopher Flynn	Unopposed		
Irish Parliamentary hold				

=== Elections in the 1910s ===
January 1910 general election: North Cork
Party	Candidate	Votes	%	±%
All-for-Ireland	Patrick Guiney	2,888	61.6	N/A
United Irish League	Michael Barry	1,798	38.4	N/A
Majority		1,090	23.2	N/A
Turnout		4,686	70.4	N/A
Registered electors		6,655		
All-for-Ireland gain from Irish Parliamentary		Swing	N/A	

December 1910 general election: North Cork
Party	Candidate	Votes	%	±%
All-for-Ireland	Patrick Guiney	Unopposed		
All-for-Ireland hold				

Guiney died in office and was succeeded by his brother John Guiney at a by-election held on 4 November 1913.

By-election, 1913: North Cork
Party	Candidate	Votes	%	±%
All-for-Ireland	John Guiney	Unopposed		
All-for-Ireland hold				

1918 general election: North Cork
Party	Candidate	Votes	%	±%
Sinn Féin	Patrick O'Keeffe	Unopposed		
Sinn Féin gain from All-for-Ireland				
