= Thomas Brennan (Irish Land League) =

Irish republican activist and agrarian radical

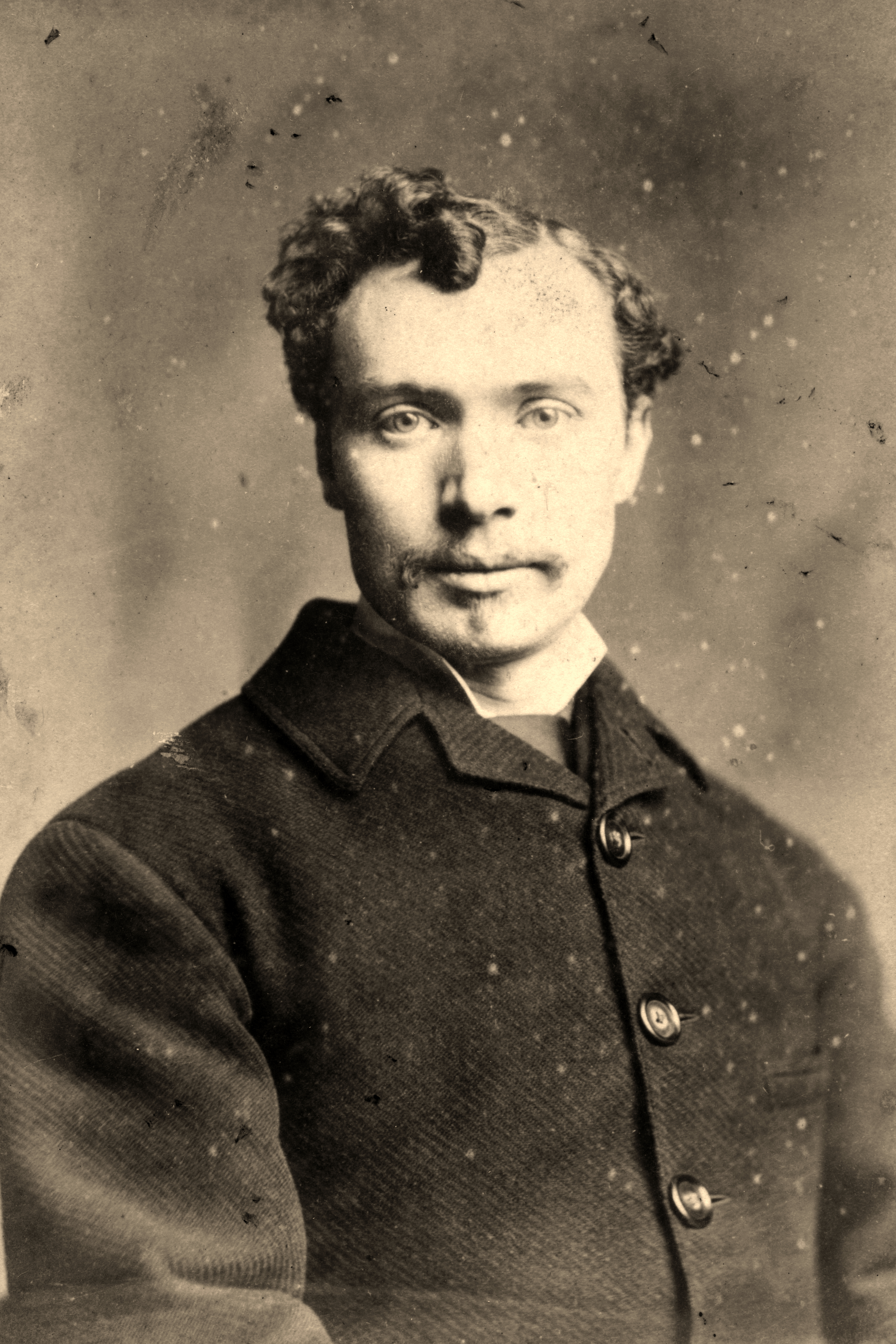
- Brennan, c. 1890
- Born: 28 July 1853; Yellow Furze, County Meath, Ireland
- Died: 19 December 1912 (aged 59); Omaha, Nebraska, United States
- Resting place: Holy Sepulchre Roman Catholic Cemetery, Omaha
- Occupations: Republican Activist, Attorney, Insurance Broker
- Parent(s): James Brennan; Catherine Rourke

Thomas Brennan (28 July 1853 – 19 December 1912) was an Irish republican activist, agrarian radical and co-founder and joint-secretary of the Irish National Land League, and a signatory of the No Rent Manifesto.

== Biography ==
=== Early life ===
Thomas was the second child of Patrick Brennan and Catherine Rourke of Yellow Furze, Beauparc, County Meath. Although not much is known of his schooling and early years, he evidently received a high degree of formal education, as illustrated by his knowledge of history and oratory skills which he displayed at a young age. By the age of 18 he was working as a clerk alongside his uncle James Rourke for the Murtagh Bros baking company in Castlebar, County Mayo. He and his uncle both joined the Irish Republican Brotherhood (IRB) in the early 1870s. Brennan, alongside other Fenians based in Connacht, successfully campaigned for John O'Connor Power in the 1874 general election, despite strong opposition to Power's candidacy from the Irish Catholic Church.

Brennan moved to Dublin in 1876 to work at the head office of Murtagh Bros, which had been renamed the North City Milling Company and was one of the largest stock companies in Ireland. The company was led by fellow IRB member Patrick Egan, who appointed Brennan as his secretary. During this time Brennan also became secretary of the Leinster IRB, and honorary secretary of the Dublin Mechanics Institute. In January 1878, Brennan organised a homecoming reception for several recently released IRB members, including Michael Davitt, who had been imprisoned at Dartmoor for seven and a half years. Following this, a close friendship developed between Brennan, Egan and Davitt.

=== The Land League ===
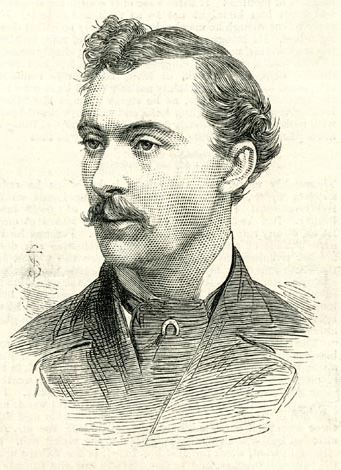
Portrait of Brennan from The Graphic, 20 November 1880

The three men fervently advocated for widespread agitation in the west of Ireland, where the conditions of tenant farmers were especially poor, igniting a period of civil-unrest and sporadic violence known as the Land Wars. They organised a large-scale protest at Irishtown, County Mayo, attended by 15,000-20,000 people, on 20 April 1879 during which Brennan was a principal speaker. The protest yielded a reversal of potential evictions and a 20% reduction in rent in the area.

This success spurred Brennan, Davitt and Egan to establish the Land League of Mayo in June 1879. They convened a meeting of Irish nationalists at the Imperial Hotel in Castlebar on 21 October 1879 during which the Irish National Land League was founded. Brennan was appointed a secretary alongside Davitt and Andrew Kettle. Prominent Home Rule League MP Charles Stewart Parnell was chosen as the Land League's first President. From 1879 to 1881 Brennan worked tirelessly within the League's executive and became a familiar face at Land League rallies, where he garnered national attention as an eloquent public speaker. As Parnell attempted to attract more moderate members to the land league, Brennan used his speeches to link the demand for tenant rights with the ultimate demand for complete Irish independence, while also demonstrating radical egalitarian and socialist views.

Due to their advocacy of non-payment of rent, all senior land league officials were arrested between December 1880 and October 1881 under the Coercion Act. Brennan was convicted under the Protection of Persons and Property Act on 23 May 1881 and imprisoned at Kilmainham Gaol. He was a signatory of the No Rent Manifesto which was issued from Kilmainham on 18 October 1881, calling for a national tenant farmer rent strike. The Land League was suppressed even further as a result.

In May 1882, Parnell agreed to the Kilmainham Treaty, in which he withdrew the manifesto and pledged to bring violence to an end in exchange for government leniency on rent owed by over 100,000 Irish tenant farmers. Under this agreement, Parnell and the Land League would return to the parameters of parliamentary and constitutional politics. This approach was strongly opposed by Brennan, who immediately sided with Davitt in continuing to promote land nationalisation upon his release from prison in June 1882. In order to prevent further fragmentation amongst Irish nationalists, Parnell invited Brennan and Davitt to draft a programme for a new national political organisation to replace the Land League during the summer and autumn of 1882. Whilst the constitution of the new Irish National League was being debated, the more radical Irish nationalists continued to propose vigorous actions against the British government and land nationalisation; however, they were overruled by Parnell. By September, Davitt had relented and agreed to substitute land nationalisation for peasant proprietorship. Brennan, ideologically opposed to the new party, effectively retired from politics and left Ireland for the United States.

=== Later life and death ===
He emigrated to New York in late 1882 to work for Patrick Ford's Irish World newspaper, which had been the largest fund-collector for the Land League and promoted radical views in opposition to Parnell. In March 1883, Brennan moved to Omaha, Nebraska where he led a career as an attorney. He became a well-known lecturer for the Irish National League of America, and he traveled across the US continuing to criticise Parnell and the wider Home Rule movement as being too centered on Westminster, and instead advocated educating the Irish populace in non-violent republicanism. Despite his close contacts with Clan na Gael, Brennan opposed the Fenian dynamite campaign of the 1880s on the grounds that it harmed the reputation of the Irish republican movement.

Brennan's former colleague, Patrick Egan, had also emigrated to Nebraska and was running a successful real-estate and insurance brokerage in the nearby city of Lincoln. When Egan was appointed as United States Ambassador to Chile in 1889, Brennan took over his business and managed the company for the remainder of his life.

He never married, and died in Omaha, Nebraska on 19 December 1912. He is buried in an unmarked grave at Holy Sepulchre Roman Catholic Cemetery, 4912 Leavenworth Street, Omaha, Nebraska.

== Politics and activism ==
Brennan's address to the crowd at the Tenant Rights meeting at Irishtown, County Mayo on 20 April 1879, that led to the formation of the Land League:

. . . I have read some history, and I find that several countries have from time to time been afflicted with the same land disease as that under which Ireland is now labouring, and although the political doctors applied many remedies, the one that proved effectual was the tearing out, root and branch, of the class that caused the disease. All right-thinking men would deplore the necessity of having recourse in this country to scenes such as have been enacted in other lands, although I for one will not hold up my hands in holy horror at a movement that gave liberty not only to France but to Europe. If excesses were at that time committed, they must be measured by the depth of slavery and ignorance in which the people had been kept, and I trust Irish landlords will in time recognize the fact that it is better for them at least to have this land question settled after the manner of a Stein or a Hardenberg than wait for the excesses of a Marat or a Robespierre.

Brennan in an interview to the Irish World on 17 June 1882 on the policy of land nationalisation and the ongoing rift between Davitt and Parnell:

I heartily endorse Davitt's actions and speeches since his release. It is necessary to base our fight on the true principles, and that is to nationalise the whole soil of Ireland - that of the town as well as that of the country - by taking what is now paid in rents for the common benefit of the people. When we win the social independence of the people, we shall also win the political independence of the nation.

Brennan's address to the Irish National League of America at the Boston Music Hall, 9 June 1883, on the "Irish question":

I ask the American people, if the science of good government is to be in accord with the wishes and opinions of the people over whom it governs, what they think of the Government that could only rule over a country of 5,000,000 subjects with the aid of a standing army larger than that which exists in the United States today, a standing army of 30,000 soldiers and police force of 14,000 men, a battalion of spies and detectives who are trained to work themselves into the confidence of the people in order to betray them, a Government, the chief servants of which are the informer and the hangman; a Government of which it has been truly said, its sceptre has been the sword, its diadem the black cap, and its throne the gallows for the last eighty years.

== Bibliography ==
- Dunbar Palmer, Norman The Irish Land League Crisis. Yale University Press, 1940
- Janis, Ely M. A Greater Ireland: The Land League and Transatlantic Nationalism in Gilded Age America. The University of Wisconsin Press, 2015
