= North Monaghan by-election =

North Monaghan by-election may refer to:

- 1886 North Monaghan by-election
- 1900 North Monaghan by-election
- 1907 North Monaghan by-election
