= New Departure (Ireland) =

The term New Departure has been used to describe several initiatives in the late 19th century by which Irish republicans, who were committed to independence from Britain by physical force, attempted to find a common ground for co-operation with groups committed to Irish Home Rule by constitutional means. In the wake of the Fenian Rising of 1867 and the unpopular executions which followed it, Fenianism was popularised and became more moderate, while the Home Rule movement was edging toward radicalism at the same time, laying the framework for the alliance. The term was coined by John Devoy in an anonymous article in the New York Herald on 27 October 1878 in which he laid out a framework for a new policy.

== 1868–1869 ==
In 1868–69, Irish Republican Brotherhood (hereafter IRB) member John O'Connor Power forged links with County Mayo MP George Henry Moore in what has been described as an early 'New Departure'. However Moore died in April 1870 and O'Connor Power successfully shifted his efforts to win Fenian support for Isaac Butt. O'Connor Power pioneered co-operation between revolutionary and constitutional activists, with Moore to have been the leader.

Michael MacDonagh writes in "The Home Rule Movement":

"He [John O'Connor Power] more than any other man, had induced the Fenians to give the Home Rule movement a chance. It was he who originated the idea of a nationalist movement with two wings, the one carrying out extreme action in Parliament, and the second pursuing revolutionary methods in Ireland, each acting independently of the other in its separate field, but both working towards one common end – the realisation of the completest measure of self-government that was possible, as circumstances changed from time to time."

The strategy was a course of parallel action, the revolutionary and constitutional wings, a secret movement and an open movement, to run in tandem.

Simultaneously, Home Rule Party leader Isaac Butt, a lawyer, had launched an amnesty campaign for the Fenian Rising prisoners.

== 1873–1876 ==
O'Connor Power and Patrick Egan's efforts led to what T. W. Moody has described as the first 'New Departure', when Fenians supported the forming of the Home Rule League in November 1873. The IRB's attitude was that while it waited for the right moment for war with England, it would support movements that could advance the cause of Irish independence "consistently with the preservation of its own integrity". The IRB became disillusioned with the lack of results achieved by Home Rulers and on 20 August 1876 dissolved the partnership and gave its members six months to withdraw from active co-operation with the Home Rule movement. The IRB supreme council enforced its resolution in March 1877 and John Barry and Patrick Egan resigned from the council. John O'Connor Power and Joseph Biggar refused to resign and were expelled.

== 1878 ==
Revolutionary and constitutional nationalists remained in contact. In January 1877, James Joseph O'Kelly, a journalist with the New York Herald persuaded John Devoy to meet with Irish parliamentarians. In January 1878, Devoy met with Parnell in Dublin. In March the exiled senior IRB member John O'Leary and Supreme Council secretary John O'Connor met secretly in London with MPs Charles Stewart Parnell, Frank Hugh O'Donnell, William Henry O'Sullivan and O'Kelly (who would be elected MP in 1880). The meeting was "sought" by Parnell (according to Ranelagh) or by William Carroll of Clan na Gael (according to Moody) to consider co-operation between the IRB and Parnell. O'Leary stated his perhaps self-contradictory doctrine to them as follows:

"Nine out of ten Irishmen entering the British Parliament with honest intentions are corrupted soon ... when once they get drawn into the whirlpool of British corruption in Dublin, with the West British society, the jobbery, the servility, very soon all the manliness goes out of them. If Irishmen are to save their honour, they must keep aloof from everything English... I am not saying that good members would not be better than bad ones, if they could keep right. George Henry Moore meant well".

Parnell apparently merely listened and did not commit himself.

John O'Connor and Dr Mark Ryan, both members of the IRB's Supreme Council, believed O'Connor Power had some hand in the new departure. O'Connor [John O'Connor] suspected that Davitt had been influenced by O'Connor Power, and that the new departure proposals concealed some sinister scheme of Power's devising – assumptions that Davitt hotly rejected.' 'The precedent for constitutional agitation set by Power was not lost on orthodox Fenians such as Dr Mark Ryan, who saw behind the new departure the nefarious influence of the member for Mayo.'

In late 1878 Michael Davitt of the IRB made a fund-raising political lecture tour of the United States, promoted by William Carroll and John Devoy of Clan na Gael. On 13 October in Brooklyn, New York Davitt first presented, in a lecture titled "Ireland in parliament from a nationalist's point of view", a doctrine that Irish republicans could not prevent Irishmen voting or being elected to the British parliament, but they could influence who was sent to that parliament. He stated that the Home Rule League, especially Isaac Butt and John O'Connor Power were failing to prevent Ireland from being 'imperialised' or 'West Britainised'. Davitt however believed that Charles Stewart Parnell and Joseph Biggar were acceptable Irish MPs, and Irish republicans should ensure that more such strong nationalists were voted in. John Devoy followed and pointed out that if Irish republicans were to gain the support of Britain's potential enemies, such as Russia, they needed to provide far stronger opposition to Britain both inside and outside parliament. He pointed out that Russia had not yet seen the Irish as providing any such meaningful opposition – in fact to Russia they appeared loyal to Britain. Hence it was necessary to replace representatives in all Irish public bodies with suitable committed nationalists. Both Davitt and Devoy at this meeting stressed that resolution of the Irish land question by transfer of ownership to the farmers themselves was integral to Irish demands on Britain.

On 27 October 1878 Devoy, without first consulting Davitt, summarised these ideas in what he termed a 'new departure' in the New York Herald, and it was reported in Ireland on 11 November. He also stated that Irish participation in the British parliament was to be temporary, and that at a suitable time Irish nationalist MPs would withdraw to Dublin and form an independent Irish legislature. Davitt was at first worried that perceived connections to the Fenians would threaten Parnell in parliament, but Devoy convinced him that Parnell would not be affected. IRB leaders John O'Leary and Charles Kickham rejected the overture to constitutionalists and Parnell gave no comment. He did however adopt the militant rhetoric of land ownership to be transferred to the Irish farmers themselves in various public speeches in Ireland. Hence the stage was set for the successful collaboration in 1879 over the Land War.

== 1879 ==
A "New Departure" initiative was forged by John Devoy of the American Clan na Gael on his visit to Paris and Ireland in 1879. The visit was sanctioned by Clan na Gael to discuss planning for a revolutionary war against Britain, and hence the "new departure" discussions can be considered Devoy's personal initiative and separate from his official mission. While the IRB leadership refused to officially support his call to co-operate with Parnell and his radical wing of the Home Rule League, the IRB's Michael Davitt supported it as a personal initiative. The high personal standing of both Davitt and Devoy with local Fenians allowed them to build a highly successful, albeit short-lived, "unofficial" partnership between moderate Fenians and Parnell's radical Home Rulers, agreed verbally in Dublin on 1 June 1879. Devoy supported the agreement because he believed that the "demands of the Land League will not be granted by a Parliament of British landlords".

This led to the escalation of the Land War (a national protest against landlords), creation of the Irish National Land League and a crisis for the British government.

The following disparate groups cooperated in the common cause of small tenant farmers:

- Revolutionary nationalists such as Matt Harris and Thomas Brennan;
- Conservative nationalists such as James Daly;
- Catholic leaders such as the influential Archbishop of Cashel and Emly, Thomas Croke (who is quoted as telling Devoy "that he had no objection to physical force in principle, but strongly opposed it because it had no chance of success" and that he had "more respect for the Fenians than for any [other] men in Ireland") and Tuam's Catholic clergy (with the notable exception of Archbishop John MacHale);
- Constitutionalists such as Parnell and Joseph Biggar;
- Pragmatic Fenians as epitomised by Davitt.

== Sources ==
- Home Rule. An Irish History 1800–2000, Alvin Jackson, London: Weidenfeld & Nicolson, 2003, ISBN 978-0-19-522048-3.
- Davitt and Irish Revolution 1846–82, T. W. Moody, Oxford: Clarendon Press, 1981, ISBN 978-0-19-820069-7
- The Revolution in Ireland, 1879–1923, ed. D. G. Boyce, London: Macmillan, 1988, ISBN 0-333-40389-4
- The Fenians in Context, Irish Politics & Society, 1848-82, R. V. Comerford, Dublin, 1985.
- "The Home Rule Movement", Michael MacDonagh, Fisher Unwin, Dublin and London, 1920.
- "The Life of Charles Stewart Parnell, 1846–1891", R. Barry O'Brien, London and New York, 1910.
- Bew, Paul (1978). Land and the National Question in Ireland: 1858-82. Amherst: Humanities Press. ISBN 9780391009608.
- Jackson, Alvin (2010) [1999]. Ireland: 1798-1998. Chichester: John Wiley & Sons. ISBN 9780631195429.
