= Protection of Persons and Property (Ireland) Act 1881 =

Act of the Parliament of the United Kingdom

Protection of Persons and Property (Ireland) Act 1881 (Note: The act had no official short title. It was referred to as Protection of Persons and Property (Ireland) Act, or with Person in the singular, and/or with (Ireland) omitted.)
- Act of Parliament
- Parliament of the United Kingdom
- Long title: An Act for the better Protection of Person and Property in Ireland.
- Citation: 44 & 45 Vict. c. 4
- Introduced by: William Ewart Gladstone, Prime Minister, 24 January 1881
- Territorial extent: United Kingdom

Dates
- Royal assent: 2 March 1881
- Commencement: 2 March 1881 (Note: The Acts of Parliament (Commencement) Act 1793.)
- Expired: 30 September 1882 (Note: Section 3.)
- Repealed: 25 August 1894
Other legislation
| Repealed by | Statute Law Revision Act 1894 |

Status: Repealed

Text of statute as originally enacted

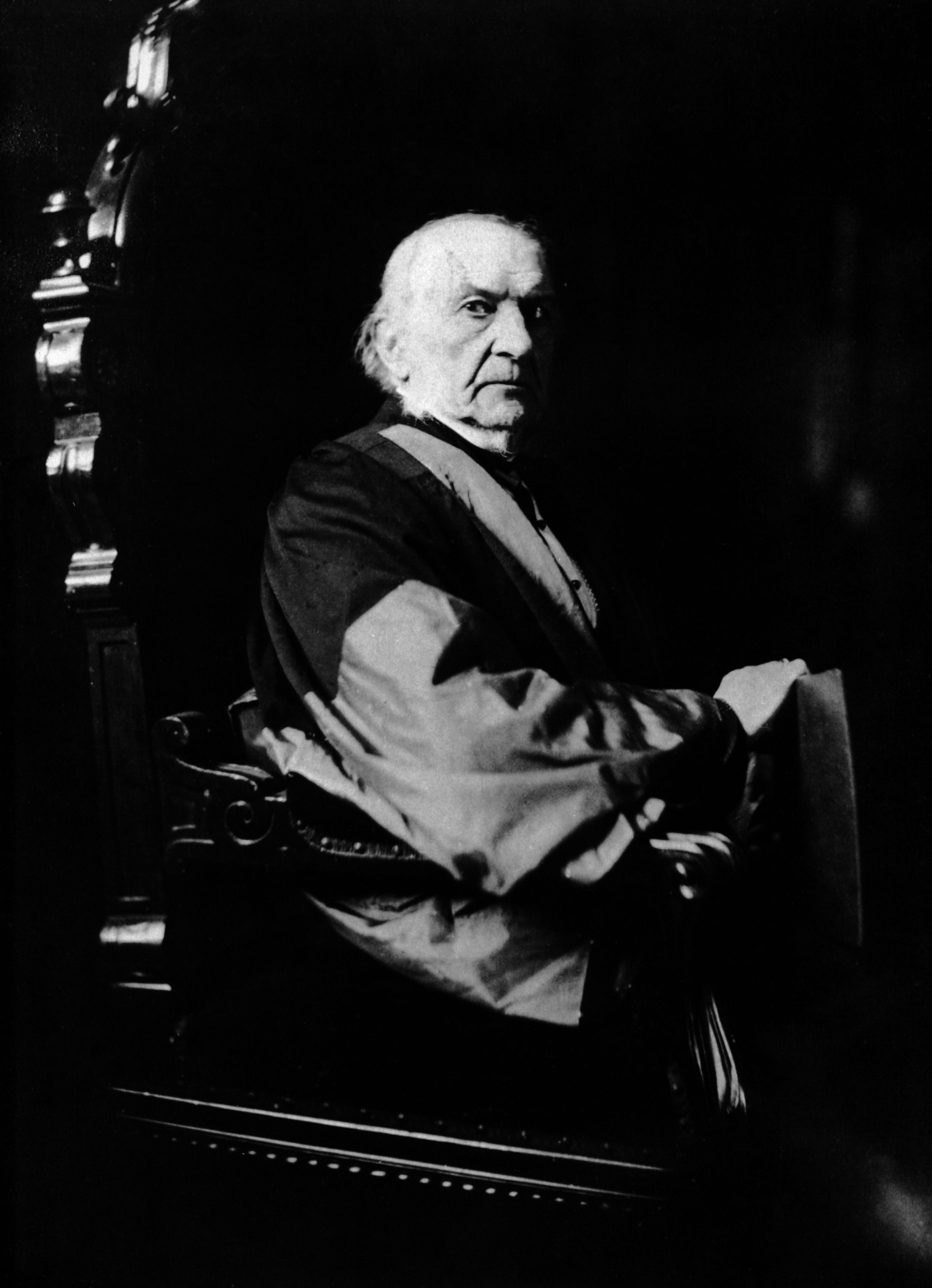
The 1881 act was introduced by William Ewart Gladstone

The Protection of Persons and Property (Ireland) Act 1881 (44 & 45 Vict. c. 4), also called the Coercion Act 1881 or the Crimes Act 1881, was an act of the Parliament of the United Kingdom which allowed for internment without trial of those suspected of involvement in the Land War in Ireland. The provisions could be introduced by proclamation of the Lord Lieutenant of Ireland in any area of the island. Lists of internees had to be laid before Parliament.

== Enactment ==
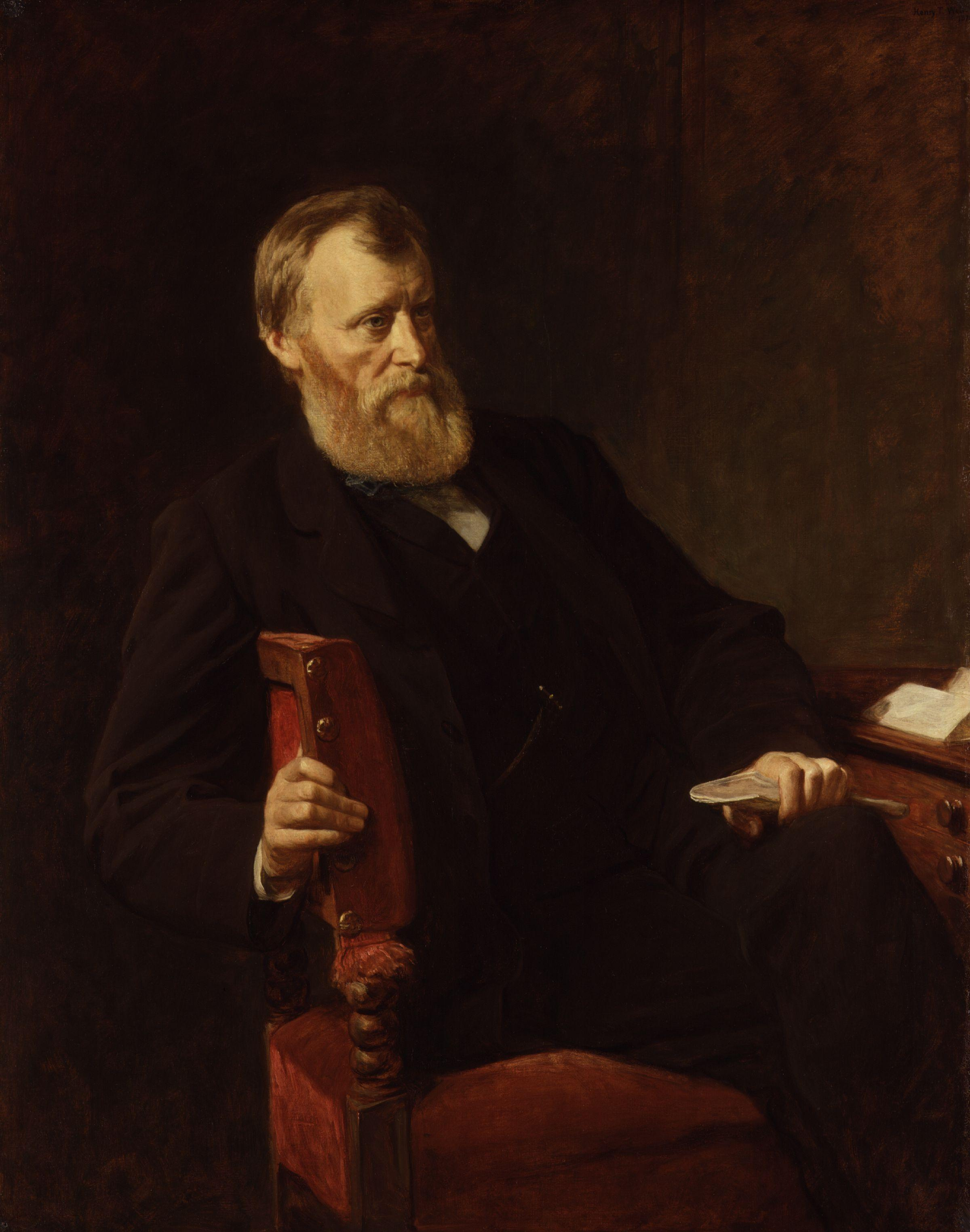
William Edward Forster by Henry Tanworth Wells.

The act was one of more than 100 Coercion Acts applied to Ireland under the Union. W. E. Gladstone was returned to office in 1880, during the agrarian violence and civil disturbance of the Land War in Ireland. William Edward Forster was made Chief Secretary for Ireland. He carried the Compensation for Disturbance Bill through the Commons, only to see it thrown out in the Lords. On 24 January 1881, he introduced a new Coercion Bill in the Commons.

The bill was strongly opposed by the Irish Parliamentary Party (IPP), which took its obstructionism tactic to new heights by filibustering the second reading for 41 hours. Eventually the Speaker resorted to ignoring IPP MPs requesting the right of speech and put the question. This controversial unprecedented move was soon formalised when Gladstone secured an amendment of the rules of order to allow for cloture ("guillotine") motions. After the bill became law in March, The Spectator commented that it had "virtually occupied the whole time of the Lower House for seven weeks and a day; for though some part of the discussion was nominally devoted to the Queen's Speech, even that debate hardly turned upon any other subject."

== Implementation ==
A total of 953 people were detained under the act. Many of them were active in the Irish National Land League; this was sufficient for the "reasonable suspicion" required by the act. On 13 October 1881, IPP leader Charles Stewart Parnell was arrested under the act after his newspaper, the United Ireland, had attacked the Land Law (Ireland) Act 1881. The arrest warrant accused Parnell of acting as principal in inciting others to "abstain from...pay[ing] rents lawfully due". He was interned in Kilmainham Gaol. United Ireland published a No Rent Manifesto the week after Parnell's imprisonment, and the Land League was banned, only to reappear as the Irish National League. Detention of Irish Americans with U.S. citizenship caused a diplomatic row between London and Washington.

== Subsequent developments ==
The act was due to expire 30 September 1882. A bill to repeal it was defeated on first reading in February 1882, having been introduced by Thomas Sexton, a signatory of the No Rent Manifesto. Forster proposed renewing the act indefinitely to deal with the crisis, but the rest of the government disagreed, and negotiations began with Parnell. These lead to the "Kilmainham Treaty", which ended boycotting such that the act was allowed to expire. Both Forster and the Lord Lieutenant, John Spencer, 5th Earl Spencer, resigned in May 1882.

The whole act was repealed by section 1 of, and the first schedule to, the Statute Law Revision Act 1894 (57 & 58 Vict. c. 54), which came into force on 25 August 1894.

== Influence on William Morris ==
The Irish Coercion Act was important in the political development of William Morris. Up to 1881 Morris considered himself a Liberal and was the treasurer of the National Liberal League, but the Coercion Act made him irrevocably break with the Liberal Party, having come to regard its name as "only a label". This was a decisive moment in Morris' leftward development, culminating in declaring himself a Revolutionary Socialist some years later.

== Bibliography ==
Primary

- Bill for better Protection of Persons and Property in Ireland. Sessional papers. Vol. HC Bill No. 79. HMSO. 1881.
- Bill for better Protection of Persons and Property in Ireland [as amended in Committee]. Sessional papers. Vol. HC Bill No. 90. HMSO. 1881.
- Regulations by Lord Lieutenant under Act for better Protection of Persons and Property in Ireland. Sessional papers. Vol. HC 130. HMSO. 1881.
- List of Persons detained in Prison under Act for better Protection of Persons and Property in Ireland. Sessional papers. Vol. HC 171. HMSO. 1881.
- Return of Persons in Custody under Protection of Persons and Property (Ireland) Act, 1881, to March 1882. Sessional papers. Vol. HC 156. HMSO. 1882.
- Letter from Captain Barlow, in Reply to Statements in House of Commons by Mr. Sexton, relative to Treatment of Persons detained under Protection of Persons and Property (Ireland) Act, 1881. Sessional papers. Vol. HC 158. HMSO. 1882.
- Correspondence respecting Imprisonment in Ireland, under Protection of Persons and Property (Ireland) Act, 1881, of Naturalised Citizens of United States. Command papers. Vol. C.3193. 1882.

Secondary

- Clark, Sam (September 1971). "The Social Composition of the Land League". Irish Historical Studies. 17 (68). Cambridge University Press: 447–469. doi:10.1017/S0021121400111617. JSTOR 30005304.
- Jackson, Patrick (1997). Education Act Forster: A Political Biography of W.E. Forster (1818-1886). Fairleigh Dickinson Univ Press. pp. 273–275. ISBN 9780838637135.
- Orridge, Andrew W. (April 1981). "Who supported the Land War? An aggregate-data analysis of Irish agrarian discontent 1879-1882" (PDF). Economic and Social Review. 12 (3): 203–233.
