= Andrew Kettle =

Irish politician (1833–1916)

Portrait Sketch of Andrew Joseph Kettle (at age 75)

Andrew Joseph Kettle (1833–1916) was a leading Irish nationalist politician, progressive farmer, agrarian agitator and founding member of the Irish Land League, known as 'the right-hand man' of Charles Stewart Parnell. He was also a much admired old friend of the nationalist politician, Frank Hugh O'Donnell, and the poet and novelist Katharine Tynan.

== Early life and career ==
Born into the Jacobean-style manor, Drynam House, Swords, County Dublin, and educated at Ireland's most prestigious Catholic boarding school, Clongowes Wood College, he was an affluent farmer owning various holdings in County Dublin. He married Margaret McCourt, daughter of Laurence McCourt of St. Margaret's, Finglas, North County Dublin. They lived mainly in Millview House, Malahide, County Dublin and had twelve children, among whom were the industrial pioneer, Laurence Kettle, and the writer, poet, Irish Volunteer and Member of Parliament (MP) at Westminster, Tom Kettle, a man widely regarded as one of the greatest minds of his generation, who died in World War I. He and his father were members of the Repeal Association.

As a member of the Tenant Right League in the 1850s, he was influenced by the policies of Isaac Butt following the publication of Butt's Plea for the Celtic Race (1866), so was from an early age in the constitutional movement to achieve Irish home rule. Kettle later became a close supporter of Michael Davitt and was instrumental in persuading Charles Stewart Parnell to support the land agitations of the late 1870s. He presided at the first meeting of the Land League in October 1879, at which Parnell became president and Kettle its honorary secretary.

In 1881 Kettle proposed that the answer to the British government's Coercion policy was that ‘’the whole Irish Party should rise and leave the House of Commons, cross over to Ireland and carry our a ‘no rent campaign’.’’ This policy of confrontation though opposed by Parnell, was adopted in modified form. Kettle was imprisoned for organising resistance to coercion. He was a signatory of the No Rent Manifesto.

Following the Kilmainham Treaty he retired from active politics to spend more time working his farms. He adhered to Parnell in his crisis of 1890, giving support to Parnell's policies. As Parnell's right-hand man, Kettle shared a lot of his opinions, and wrote of his own views:

I confess that I felt [in 1885], and still feel, a greater leaning towards the British Tory party than I ever could have towards the so-called Liberals.

Some historians believe that Parnell, and Timothy Healy, shared that viewpoint.

Kettle stood for election as a nationalist candidate on several occasions.

On the occasion of his death the following obituary appeared in the Cork Examiner:

VETERAN NATIONALIST. Sincere and widespread regret will be felt at the announcement of the death of Mr. A. J. Kettle, father of the late Lieut. T. M. Kettle, which occurred at his residence, St. Margaret’s co. Dublin. The deceased gentleman had reached the ripe age of 83. From the start of the constitutional movement he had been one of the most active spirits, and the faithful counsellor of its leaders. He was one of the founders of the Dublin Tenants’ Defence Association, and in that capacity was one of the deputation that induced the youth Parnell to challenge the Tory hold on County Dublin, in the contest against Colonel Taylor, which was Parnell’s baptism of fire in Irish politics. When Davitt unfurled the banner of the Land League he joined him in the foundation of the organisation, and was one of the most prominent members of the Land League Executive. Upon the arrest of Parnell, Dillon, Davitt, and the other leaders in 1861, he assumed with Mr. Patrick Egan the control of the organisation; and was one of the signatories of the No Rent Manifesto. His arrest under the Forster Coercion Act speedily followed, and he was imprisoned first at Naas and afterwards at Kilmainham. At the General Election of 1880 he had been put forward by the Land League as a candidate for County Cork in opposition to Colonel Colthurst. Though powerful forces were in operation against him, he secured a substantial vote, which however, failed to carry him to victory. After the lamentable events of 1890 he adhered to Mr. Parnell, and stood as a candidate for the representation of County Carlow, upon the death of O’Gorman Mahon. Again he was defeated in his Parliamentary candidature after a tough fight Strenuous as he was in battle, there was no more tolerant and generously minded man, and none welcomed more eagerly the re-union of the Nationalist forces. The passing away now of this great veteran Nationalist will be deeply mourned by Irishmen in every quarter of the habitable globe.
