= Pat O'Brien (Irish politician) =

Irish Nationalist politician

Patrick O'Brien (c.1847 – 12 July 1917) was an Irish Nationalist MP in the House Of Commons of the United Kingdom of Great Britain and Ireland and as member of the Irish Parliamentary Party represented North Monaghan (1886–1892) and Kilkenny City (1895–1917). He was Chief Whip of the Irish Party from 1907 until his death in 1917.

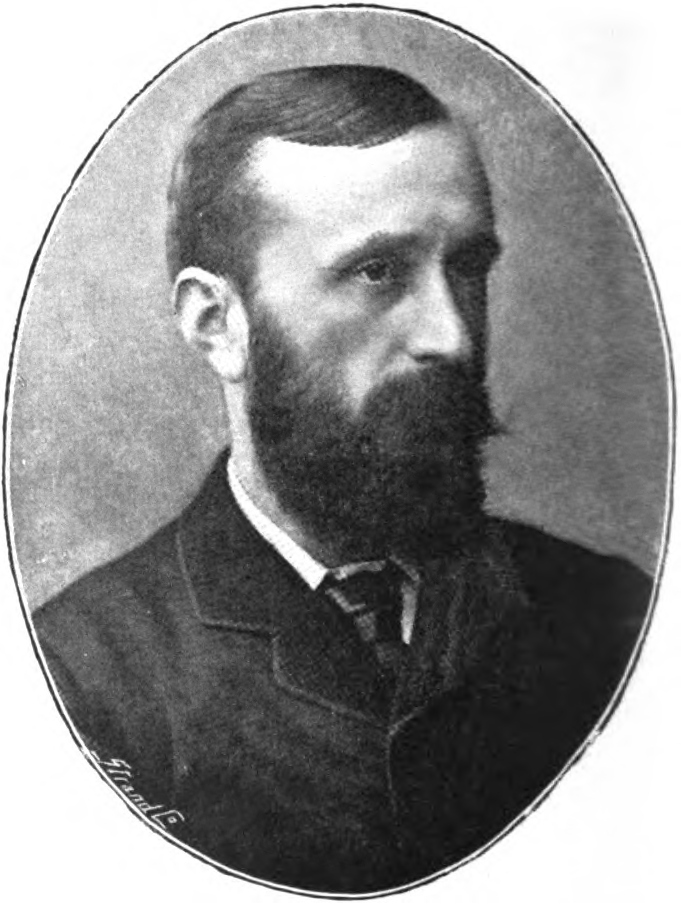
Pat O'Brien in 1895

== Biography ==
The second son of James O’Brien of Tullamore, Co. Offaly, he never married. He trained as a mechanical and marine engineer but subsequently moved to Liverpool where he set up a business as a coal merchant. In his early days he was a Fenian and was imprisoned as such. After moving to England he became active in the Land League and in the Home Rule Confederation of Great Britain, and was again imprisoned in his capacity as secretary of the Commercial Branch of the Land League in Liverpool. He became known to Charles Stewart Parnell, who chose him as candidate for North Monaghan at a by-election in February 1886 after Tim Healy, who had won the seat in 1885, elected to sit for South Londonderry. O’Brien was reluctant to stand but yielded to Parnell's instructions to be in Monaghan the following morning. He went to catch the steamer for Ireland without returning home for his coat, but borrowed one which was several sizes too large from a friend he met in the street. In this he appeared at the Party convention.

O’Brien was very active in the Plan of Campaign in 1887–90. He was imprisoned 5 times in 1888 and 1890, being given sentences totalling nearly 18 months. He always had a camera with him on Land League campaigns, and took photographs of scenes of eviction which he exhibited on a barge in the Thames opposite the House of Commons to members on the Terrace and crowds on Westminster Bridge. J. P. Hayden described the circumstances of his first encounter with O’Brien on 1 January 1888, at a protest meeting at Four Roads, Co. Roscommon. O’Brien and James Gilhooly were both speakers, the latter under warrant of arrest under the Coercion Act. In order to protect Gilhooly, Hayden as chair introduced O’Brien as Gilhooly and Gilhooly as O’Brien. Gilhooly was taken away surreptitiously from the meeting after his speech. The police subsequently followed O’Brien thinking he was Gilhooly, and arrested him the next day in Athlone. They had to release him. However he was arrested as himself a few days afterwards for his speech at Four Roads.

At the time of the Split over Parnell's leadership in December 1890, O’Brien was in prison, but on his release he declared for Parnell. He was made whip of the Parnellite party after Parnell's death in October 1891. At the following election in 1892 the Parnellites did not contest North Monaghan, where a split in the Nationalist vote would probably have given the seat to the Unionist candidate. O'Brien fought Limerick City as a Parnellite instead, but was defeated. He won election as a Parnellite at Kilkenny City in 1895 by the narrow majority of 14 votes and thereafter held this seat unopposed.

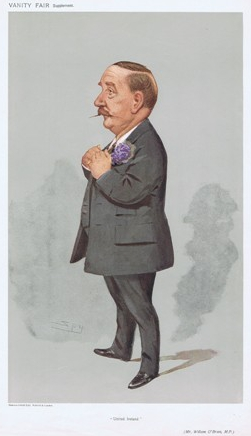
"United Ireland" O'Brien as caricatured by Spy (Leslie Ward) in Vanity Fair, May 1907

When the Irish Party reunited in 1900, O’Brien became one of its whips and remained so until his death. He played a key role in the passage of the Home Rule Act 1914 when many voting ambushes were attempted by the opposition.

Along with fellow Parnellites Willie Redmond and J. J. Clancy, O'Brien was one of the small circle of political intimates of the leader of the Irish Party, John Redmond. He often spent holidays at Redmond's home at Aghavannagh, Co. Wicklow, and moved there at Redmond's invitation during his last illness. His death from a stroke in July 1917 only a month after Willie Redmond (John Redmond's brother) was killed serving with the 16th (Irish) Division on the Western Front on 9 June 1917 was a devastating blow to John Redmond. Stephen Gwynn recorded of Redmond at O'Brien's funeral that 'Then, and then only in his lifetime people saw him publicly break down; he had to be led away from the grave'.

== Sources ==
- Freeman’s Journal, 13–14 July 1917
- Stephen Gwynn, John Redmond's Last Years, London, Edward Arnold, 1919
- Patrick Maume, The long Gestation, Irish Nationalist Life 1891-1918, p. 237, Gill & Macmillan (1999) ISBN 0-7171-2744-3
- Brian M. Walker (ed.), Parliamentary Election Results in Ireland, 1801-1922, Dublin, Royal Irish Academy, 1978
- Who Was Who 1916-1928

Parliament of the United Kingdom
Preceded by Tim Healy	Member of Parliament for North Monaghan; 1886–1892	Succeeded by Charles Diamond
Preceded by Thomas Bartholomew Curran	Member of Parliament for Kilkenny City; 1895–1917	Succeeded by W. T. Cosgrave
