= No Rent Manifesto =

1881 political tract in Irish land war

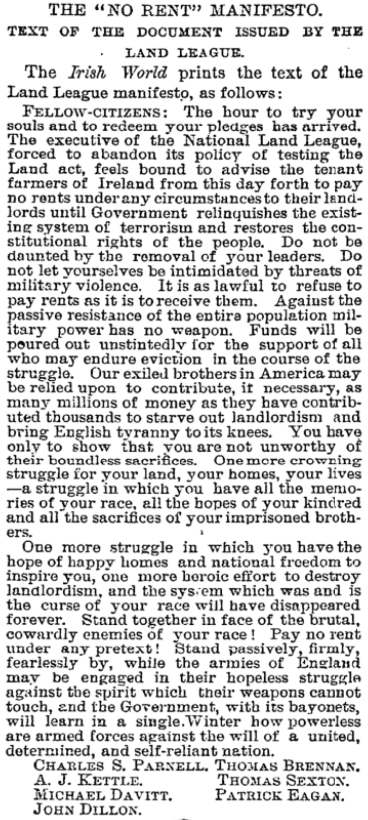
- Text of the manifesto reprinted in The New York Times on 21 October 1881
- Presented: 18 October 1881
- Commissioned by: Charles Stewart Parnell
- Author: William O'Brien
- Signatories: Parnell, Thomas Brennan, A. J. Kettle, Thomas Sexton, Michael Davitt, Patrick Egan, John Dillon
- Purpose: Effectuating a rent strike during the Land War

The No Rent Manifesto was a document issued in Ireland on 18 October 1881, by imprisoned leaders of the Irish National Land League calling for a campaign of passive resistance by the entire population of small tenant farmers, by withholding rents to obtain large rent abatements under the Land Law (Ireland) Act 1881. The intention being to "put the Act to the test" and prove its inadequacy to provide for the core demands of the tenants – the 'three Fs' of fair rent, fixity of tenure and free sale – as well as providing sufficient funds for occupier purchase.

== Land War origins ==
Following the Irish Famine Irish politics lacked direction. Only with the formation of the Home Rule Party in 1870 under its founder Isaac Butt did a Nationalist movement begin to form, albeit with a vague policy of self-government for Ireland. While it won support from the majority of nationalists it lacked the dynamism needed to gain widespread support. Most Irish people, particularly tenant farmers, were more concerned with everyday needs. In the second half of the 1870s crop failures caused serious hardships. Wages fell and evictions were on the increase. Tenants began to demand rent abatements. This marked the beginning of the Land War in 1879 which lasted until 1882.

== Land League emergence ==
The short comings of the Home Rule Party brought Charles Stewart Parnell, a young ascendancy landlord and MP for County Meath, into the foreground, who was all too aware of its shortcomings. In contrast to Butt, he was of a more militant nature. In the House of Commons he was considered a radical obstructionalist.

Following discussions with the Fenians John Devoy and Michael Davitt in June 1879, he launched the New Departure to fuse land agitation with the Home Rule movement. This was followed in October 1879 by the foundation of the Irish National Land League at a meeting in County Mayo where Parnell was elected president of the League. Andrew Kettle, Michael Davitt, and Thomas Brennan were appointed as honorary secretaries. The Land League united the different strands of land agitation and tenant rights movements under a single organisation. The government had introduced the first ineffective Land Act in 1870, followed by the equally lacking Acts of 1880 and 1881. Parnell, although close to advanced nationalists and land reform, carefully retained his constitutional credentials in London.

== Land League banned ==
But now in 1881 Parnell decided to move towards direct confrontation with the government. The prime minister William Ewart Gladstone had made a considerable advance with his second Land Act to meet Irish demands. But the crucial faults of the Act were that it left the definition of a fair rent to the discretion of the Land Court judges, and that those in rent-arrears were denied recourse to the fair-rent clause. For Davitt, no rent was the only fair rent. The support newspaper of the Land League, The United Ireland edited by William O'Brien was quick to expose the short comings of the act. Parnell and O'Brien were convinced of the need to stem the flock of tenants, urged by the clergy, seeking rent abatement in the courts, as they were certain that the act would leave most of the rents unchanged. Together with all of his party lieutenants Parnell went into a bitter verbal offensive against the act, urging tenants to withhold rents. Gladstone's cabinet decided "to transmute Parnell, by imprisonment, into a symbol of the Irish nation" where he was interned under the Irish Coercion Act in Kilmainham Jail on 12 October for "sabotaging the Land Act". Two days later the Land League was banned. Several other members of the party joined their leader in Kilmainham jail. O'Brien followed three days later, having been guilty with his publication of "treasonable practices".

== No Rent Manifesto ==
At this point Parnell decided it was the time to launch a "no-rent" campaign in Ireland. He chose the new jail arrival to draft such a plan with the words "O'Brien, of all the men in the world, you are the man we wanted" tasking him to draft a "No Rent Manifesto". It appeared on the front page of the United Ireland on 22 October, and published abroad in The New York Times. It bore the signatures of the League executive board, Dillon only signing reluctantly. Davitt's name was added because he was in jail in England, which he disapproved of, saying the action was eight months too late. O'Brien's text read as follows:

NO RENT MANIFESTO

'FELLOW-CITIZENS: The hour to try your souls and to redeem your pledges has arrived. The executive of the National Land League, forced to abandon its policy of testing the Land act, feels bound to advise the tenant farmers of Ireland from this day forth to pay no rents under any circumstances to their landlords until Government relinquishes the existing system of terrorism and restores the constitutional rights of the people. Do not be daunted by the removal of your leaders. Do not let yourselves be intimidated by threats of military violence. It is as lawful to refuse to pay rents as it is to receive them. Against the passive resistance of the entire population military power has no weapon. Funds will be poured out unstintedly for the support of all who may endure eviction in the course of the struggle. Our exiled brothers in America may be relied upon to contribute, if necessary, as many millions of money as they have contributed thousands to starve out landlordism and bring English tyranny to its knees. You have only to show that you are not unworthy of their boundless sacrifices. One more crowning struggle for your land, your homes, your lives – a struggle in which you have all the memories of your race, all the hopes of your kindred and all the sacrifices of your imprisoned brothers.

Stand together in face of the brutal,

cowardly enemies of your race !

One more struggle in which you have the hope of happy homes and national freedom to inspire you, one more heroic effort to destroy landlordism, and the system which was and is the curse of your race will have disappeared forever. Stand together in face of the brutal, cowardly enemies of your race! Pay no rent under any pretext! Stand passively, firmly, fearlessly by, while the armies of England may be engaged in their hopeless struggle against the spirit which their weapons cannot touch, and the Government, with its bayonets, will learn in a single Winter how powerless are armed forces against the will of a united, determined, and self-reliant nation.

CHARLES S. PARNELL. THOMAS BRENNAN.
A. J. KETTLE. THOMAS SEXTON.
MICHAEL DAVITT. PATRICK EGAN.
JOHN DILLON.

== Kilmainham Treaty ==
The Irish Hierarchy, especially the Archbishops Edward MacCabe of Dublin and Thomas Croke of Cashel, condemned the document outright, as did the Freeman's Journal and The Nation, both opposing Parnell's tactics. Against such an outcry O'Brien's suppressed United Ireland, now published in London and Paris, which he edited from his prison cell, had little chance of arousing national support for the campaign, which eventually largely failed its objective.

Outrages on the land increased significantly, so that by the spring Gladstone decided to negotiate directly with Parnell, resulting in the Kilmainham Treaty of 25 April 1882, whereby the government agreed to expand the 1881 Act to cover tenant farmers in arrears and to phase out coercion. Parnell in return agreed to withdraw the manifesto and bring violence to an end. The arrangement was unpopular with radicals as it resulted in a decisive shift away from radical land reform to a mainly constitutional movement for Home Rule.
