= James Daly (activist) =

Irish nationalist activist (1838-1911)

James Daly (1838 - 21 January 1911) was an Irish nationalist activist best known for his work in support of tenant farmers' rights and the formation of the Irish National Land League.

== Beginnings ==
Daly was a conservative Catholic man from a comfortably-off Mayo farming family. From 1869 he served on the Castlebar Board of Guardians, and acted as a guardian for the Litterbrick Division in Ballina union.

Daly took up the emerging political cause in the west of Ireland to establish tenant farmers' rights against largely absentee landlords, and took part in the 1875 meeting in Louisburgh, County Mayo convened to establish a local tenants' defence association.

From May 1876, Daly and Alfred O'Hea supported Matt Harris's Ballinasloe Tenants' Defence Association.

In February 1876, Daly, together with Alfred O'Hea, purchased the Mayo Telegraph, renamed The Connaught Telegraph in 1878. He became sole owner in 1879 following O'Hea's death. The Connaught Telegraph became the early publicity vehicle for what was initially a Mayo-based land movement.

On 26 October 1878, the Mayo Tenants' Defence Association (also known as the Mayo Farmers' Club) was formed at Castlebar, with Westport barrister J. J. Louden as chairman and Daly as secretary. The local MP, John O'Connor Power, attended, extending the support of the "advanced" faction of the home rule movement to the growing land movement. This support was reinforced by Parnell himself when he joined Daly, O'Connor Power, James Kilmartin and Matt Harris at the Ballinasloe Tenants' Defence Association meeting on 3 November 1878.

== The "Canon Bourke" controversy ==
The immediate trigger for the 20 April 1879 Irishtown mass meeting is disputed. According to one commonly cited theory, local Irishtown tenant farmers approached Daly in January 1879 seeking support against a landowner variously referred to as "Canon Ulick Burke", "Bourke", "Canon Burke", or "Father Burke". This landowner had reportedly inherited a property with 22 tenants, all in arrears, had increased rents, and had taken legal steps toward eviction. He is said to have backed down after the mass meeting and reduced rents.

The historian T. W. Moody disputes this account, arguing that it rests on Michael Davitt's faulty recollection before the 1889 Times-Parnell Commission and in his 1904 work The Fall of Feudalism in Ireland, later repeated by Sheehy-Skeffington in 1908. Moody points out that no contemporary account of the events mentions a Canon Bourke as an issue at all. He argues that Geoffrey James Bourke, canon of Tuam Cathedral, had nothing to do with the "Bourke Estate", and that any dispute would in fact have concerned the absentee landlord, his nephew Joseph Bourke. Moody further notes that Daly himself rejected the story outright, criticising Davitt's unfamiliarity with Mayo affairs, and that the Bourke estate's rents had in any case been fixed in 1855 for a period of thirty-one years, meaning there could have been no rack-renting. Canon Bourke, Moody adds, in fact supported the land movement, sat on the platform, and seconded John Dillon's resolution at the July 1879 Claremorris meeting, remaining a respected parish priest until his death.

Moody identifies Canon (or, as he sometimes styles him, Fr) Ulick Joseph Bourke, president of St Jarlath's College, Tuam, as a distinct individual who was in fact sympathetic to the fenian cause and served on the committee of the Irish National Land League from its formation in October 1879. John Cunningham likewise refers to "Professor Ulick Bourke" as president of St Jarlath's, citing the fenian activist Mark Ryan's account of Bourke's active support for the 1868 election campaign of George Moore, a fenian sympathiser and supporter of tenant right.

== Lead up to the 20 April 1879 Irishtown meeting ==
For many months, the agricultural sector had been in recession owing to poor harvests and cheap imports. The law as it stood was widely regarded as favouring landowners over struggling tenant farmers, prompting evictions of "unprofitable" tenants and the conversion of holdings to grazing land. Tenant farmers, traditionally cautious in outlook, were growing desperate for relief, and increasingly receptive to more assertive nationalists who linked economic hardship to political oppression and raised the question of who morally owned the land.

By 1879, Daly judged the time for action to be right. He had grown impatient, as expressed in the Connaught Telegraph, with the lack of progress achieved through constitutional means or through John Devoy's "New Departure", an uneasy alliance between Fenians prepared to defer armed struggle and radical Home Rulers. He feared that further delay might drive desperate men toward another failed uprising, an outcome he abhorred. Parnell, meanwhile, was positioning himself to succeed Isaac Butt as leader of the Home Rule League, and a growing land campaign offered him a suitable political issue ahead of the coming election. Daly was not himself a Fenian, but was willing to accept any meaningful assistance short of violence from that quarter. The New Departure offered what seemed a short-lived opportunity to combine Fenian mass mobilisation with activism within the constitutional system, championed by Parnell and O'Connor Power, with Michael Davitt the key figure linking both camps.

Davitt was in Mayo at the time investigating land grievances, assisted by his cousin John Walshe. He is generally credited with the vision to extend tenant land protests from a local to a coordinated national movement. Davitt, along with Fenians including John Walshe and P.W. Nally of Balla, met with Daly and his local organisers: Fenian tenant farmer Daniel O'Connor of Irishtown, schoolteacher J.P. Quinn, and two Claremorris shopkeepers, Thomas Sweeney and John O'Kane.

A group of farmers from the Irishtown area had approached Daly in January 1879 during the Claremorris quarter-sessions to complain of their treatment by landlords. To avoid libel, Daly declined to name the landlords concerned but agreed to publish the grievances in general terms. He advertised a mass protest meeting for 22 February 1879 in the Connaught Telegraph, though the meeting had to be postponed until April. On 19 April 1879, the day before the rescheduled gathering, the Connaught Telegraph announced the "Irishtown Tenant-Right Meeting", describing it as an assembly of tenant farmers from Mayo, Galway and Roscommon, addressed by, among others, John O'Connor Power MP, John Ferguson of Glasgow, and J. J. Louden of Westport, and predicted it would be one of the largest gatherings ever held in Connaught.

== The 20 April 1879 Irishtown meeting ==
The Connaught Telegraph's report of the meeting, published on 26 April 1879, described it as the largest public demonstration witnessed since the days of O'Connell. The report detailed a lengthy procession from Claremorris involving several thousand men on foot, distinguished by laurel leaves or green ribbons according to district, and a large mounted contingent led by marshals wearing green and gold sashes. Prominent figures, including Louden, Daly, O'Connor Power, John Ferguson and Thomas Brennan, travelled by carriage, followed by hundreds of further vehicles from surrounding towns, converging on the small hamlet of Irishtown, on the boundary of Mayo, Roscommon and Galway.

Home Ruler and land reformer John Ferguson put forward a resolution asserting that the land of Ireland had been intended by providence for the sustenance of the people who worked it, and that any system granting monopoly ownership to a landlord class, used for usurious or self-serving political ends, demanded resistance as a matter of basic self-preservation.

Michael M. O'Sullivan, a Catholic College teacher and early tenant right activist from Galway, is said to have drawn the strongest response from the crowd. He argued that two poor seasons and sheep disease had left tenant farmers unable to meet existing rents, and that justice therefore demanded a reduction. He suggested that where landlords refused to lower rents to reflect the tenants' altered circumstances, farmers should agree among themselves on a fair rent, and withhold payment entirely if the landlord would not accept it. He warned that the likely consequence of continued refusal would be, in his words, the "extermination of the exterminators" as much as of the people, a remark met with applause.

"Ribbon Fenian" Thomas Brennan struck a more ominous note, drawing a parallel between Ireland's land question and similar crises in other countries, where he argued the only effective remedy had been the removal of the class responsible for the problem. He stopped short of endorsing violence outright, but warned that unless Irish landlords settled the question through reasoned means, they risked the fate of revolutionary excess visited on their counterparts elsewhere.

== T. M. Healy's view of the Irishtown meeting ==
T. M. Healy, later a bitter opponent of Parnell, recorded his impression that Parnell had not yet grasped the significance of the emerging Land War, and underlined the importance of coverage provided by The Connaught Telegraph, one of only two newspapers (the other being The Tuam Herald) to report the event at all. According to Healy, O'Connor Power, on returning to London, described to him a meeting attended by large numbers of footmen and mounted men, the latter organised with military discipline, and warned that Ireland was on the verge of a significant new movement. Yet the meeting went largely unnoticed at the time, save by Daly's local paper.

Healy further recorded that King-Harman MP, who had read the report, later remonstrated with O'Connor Power in the House of Commons, reflecting the concern of landlord interests for the financial stakes involved. When Parnell learned of the Irishtown meeting's success, he asked Davitt, who had been advised to stay away, to organise a second gathering there the following Sunday, which duly attracted wider attention. Davitt later explained his absence from the first meeting by saying that he had missed his train; Healy records that Daly, who had helped organise both meetings, wryly suggested Davitt would have been "father of the Land League" had he not done so.

T. W. Moody notes that Healy's account of Davitt missing the train appears to derive from Alexander Martin Sullivan's New Ireland and is otherwise uncorroborated, as is the quip attributed to Daly. Nonetheless, it appears that Daly and Davitt held differing views of their respective importance to the early land war. Moody observes that Daly's January 1881 account in the Connaught Telegraph, which claimed Davitt was not involved until the June Westport meeting, is inaccurate; equally, Davitt's July 1882 account omitted Daly and claimed sole responsibility for himself, though he later told the 1889 Times-Parnell Commission that he had not been responsible, before again failing to credit Daly in his 1904 work The Fall of Feudalism.

== Following the Irishtown meeting ==
Daly chaired the Westport meeting of 8 June 1879, addressed by Parnell and Davitt, which gave the land reform movement its decisive national political momentum.

Daly became vice-president of the new National Land League of Mayo on 16 August 1879, and was elected to the committee of the Irish National Land League on its foundation in Dublin on 21 October 1879, when the Mayo Land League was absorbed into the national body.

== The Bessborough Commission ==
Daly organised the presentation of evidence from Mayo that strongly influenced the Bessborough Commission's recommendation for radical revision of the tenurial system, providing Gladstone with the justification he needed for the 1881 Land Act. According to the historian Joseph Lee, landlords challenged Daly's command of the evidence on exorbitant rents in only around 30% of cases, and seriously undermined his testimony in fewer than 10%.

== The "Gurteen three" ==
On 2 November 1879, Davitt addressed a land meeting at Gurteen, County Sligo, declaring that "the time has come when the manhood of Ireland will spring to its feet and say it will tolerate this system no longer". Daly told the same meeting that it was the duty of a tenant's fellows to reinstate him the day after any eviction. James Bryce Killen closed his own speech by wishing that everyone present were "armed with a rifle". On 19 November, Davitt, Daly and Killen were arrested on a charge of seditious language. Their arrest prompted mass protest meetings and gave Parnell material for a propaganda campaign in Britain and the United States; the authorities ultimately failed to secure a conviction, a failure Moody describes as having brought considerable ridicule upon the government.

Davitt, Daly and Killen became known as "The Gurteen Three". President Mary McAleese later described the case as one that, though ostensibly concerned with an allegedly inflammatory speech, ended in a collapsed trial that in effect marked the end of feudal landlordism in Ireland.

== Later years ==
Daly grew uncomfortable with the centralisation of the land movement, which he felt was drifting away from the west of Ireland, the area of greatest need, and was also wary of the use of physical force in pursuit of the movement's aims. He returned to local politics and left the Land League. He sold The Connaught Telegraph to T. H. Gillespie in 1888 and became a full-time farmer. He continued to serve in local government, sitting on Mayo County Council and Castlebar Urban District Council. He remained a figure in local politics, supporting the United Irish League and serving as president of the Connacht '98 Council.

== Retrospective ==
Gerry Adams used his Michael Davitt Centenary Lecture of 15 June 2006 to argue that land reform in the west of Ireland has since regressed.
