= North Monaghan =

Former parliamentary constituency in the United Kingdom

- Former county constituency for the House of Commons

1885–1922
- Seats: 1
- Created from: County Monaghan
- Replaced by: Monaghan

North Monaghan was a parliamentary constituency in Ireland, returning one Member of Parliament (MP) to the House of Commons of the Parliament of the United Kingdom, from 1885 to 1922.

Prior to the 1885 United Kingdom general election the area was part of the County Monaghan constituency. From 1922, on the establishment of the Irish Free State, it was not represented in the UK Parliament.

== Boundaries ==
This constituency comprised the northern part of County Monaghan.

1885–1922: The baronies of Dartree, Monaghan and Trough.

== Members of Parliament ==
Election	Member	Party
1885	Timothy Healy	Nationalist
1886(b)	Pat O'Brien	Nationalist
1891	Pat O'Brien	Parnellite Nationalist
1892	Charles Diamond	Irish National Federation
1895	Daniel MacAleese	Irish National Federation
1900(b)	Edward Charles Thompson	Nationalist
1906	Patrick O'Hare	Nationalist
1907(b)	James Lardner	Nationalist
1918	Ernest Blythe	Sinn Féin
1922	constituency abolished	

== Elections ==
=== Elections in the 1880s ===
1885 general election: North Monaghan
Party	Candidate	Votes	%	±%
Irish Parliamentary	Tim Healy	4,055	60.2	
Irish Conservative	John Leslie	2,685	39.8	
Majority		1,370	20.4	
Turnout		6,740	89.6	
Registered electors		7,525		
Irish Parliamentary win (new seat)				

Healy is also elected MP for South Londonderry and opts to sit there, causing a by-election.

By-election 1886: North Monaghan
Party	Candidate	Votes	%	±%
Irish Parliamentary	Pat O'Brien	4,015	61.1	+0.9
Irish Conservative	James Campbell Hall	2,551	38.9	−0.9
Majority		1,464	22.2	+1.8
Turnout		6,566	87.3	−2.3
Registered electors		7,525		
Irish Parliamentary hold		Swing	+0.9	

1886 general election: North Monaghan
Party	Candidate	Votes	%	±%
Irish Parliamentary	Pat O'Brien	3,962	61.4	+1.2
Irish Conservative	John Leslie	2,491	38.6	−1.2
Majority		1,471	22.8	+2.4
Turnout		6,453	85.8	−3.8
Registered electors		7,525		
Irish Parliamentary hold		Swing	+1.2	

=== Elections in the 1890s ===
1892 general election: North Monaghan
Party	Candidate	Votes	%	±%
Irish National Federation	Charles Diamond	3,697	62.1	+0.7
Irish Unionist	Henry William Jackson	2,260	37.9	−0.7
Majority		1,437	24.2	+1.4
Turnout		5,957	84.5	−1.3
Registered electors		7,047		
Irish National Federation gain from Irish Parliamentary		Swing	+0.7	

1895 general election: North Monaghan
Party	Candidate	Votes	%	±%
Irish National Federation	Daniel MacAleese	3,377	61.7	−0.4
Irish Unionist	Peter Craven Westenra	2,094	38.3	+0.4
Majority		1,283	23.4	−0.8
Turnout		5,471	80.3	−4.2
Registered electors		6,815		
Irish National Federation hold		Swing	−0.4	

=== Elections in the 1900s ===
1900 general election: North Monaghan
Party	Candidate	Votes	%	±%
Irish Parliamentary	Daniel MacAleese	Unopposed		
Registered electors		7,014		
Irish Parliamentary hold				

MacAleese dies, causing a by-election.

By-election, 1900: North Monaghan
Party	Candidate	Votes	%	±%
Irish Parliamentary	Edward Charles Thompson	Unopposed		
Registered electors		7,014		
Irish Parliamentary hold				

1906 general election: North Monaghan
Party	Candidate	Votes	%	±%
Irish Parliamentary	Patrick O'Hare	Unopposed		
Registered electors		6,486		
Irish Parliamentary hold				

O'Hare resigns, causing a by-election.

By-election, 1907: North Monaghan
Party	Candidate	Votes	%	±%
Irish Parliamentary	James Lardner	Unopposed		
Registered electors		6,324		
Irish Parliamentary hold				

=== Elections in the 1910s ===
January 1910 general election: North Monaghan
Party	Candidate	Votes	%	±%
Irish Parliamentary	James Lardner	3,477	63.4	N/A
Irish Unionist	Michael Elliott Knight	2,005	36.6	New
Majority		1,472	26.8	N/A
Turnout		5,482	85.2	N/A
Registered electors		6,435		
Irish Parliamentary hold		Swing	N/A	

December 1910 general election: North Monaghan
Party	Candidate	Votes	%	±%
Irish Parliamentary	James Lardner	3,365	63.5	+0.1
Irish Unionist	Michael Elliott Knight	1,937	36.5	−0.1
Majority		1,428	27.0	+0.2
Turnout		5,302	82.4	−2.8
Registered electors		6,435		
Irish Parliamentary hold		Swing	+0.1	

1918 general election: North Monaghan
Party	Candidate	Votes	%	±%
Sinn Féin	Ernest Blythe	6,842	48.7	New
Irish Unionist	Michael Elliott Knight	4,497	32.0	−4.5
Irish Parliamentary	John Joseph Turley	2,709	19.3	−44.2
Majority		2,345	16.7	N/A
Turnout		14,048	86.9	+4.5
Registered electors		16,175		
Sinn Féin gain from Irish Parliamentary		Swing		
