= Daniel MacAleese =

Irish politician

Daniel MacAleese (1833 – 1 December 1900) was an Irish nationalist politician and Member of Parliament (MP) in the House of Commons of the United Kingdom of Great Britain and Ireland.

He was elected as the Irish National Federation (Anti-Parnellite) MP for the North Monaghan constituency at the 1895 general election, and was re-elected unopposed as the Irish Parliamentary Party MP at the 1900 general election. He died in office in 1900 and the subsequent by-election was won by Edward Charles Thompson.

Parliament of the United Kingdom
Preceded by Charles Diamond	Member of Parliament for North Monaghan; 1895 – 1900	Succeeded by Edward Charles Thompson
