= Charles Diamond =

Irish newspaper entrepreneur and politician

Charles Diamond (17 November 1858 – 19 February 1934) was an Irish newspaper entrepreneur and Labour Party politician.

== Early life ==
Charles Diamond was born on 17 November 1858 in Derry, Ireland. He later emigrated to England, settling in Newcastle-upon-Tyne by 1878.

== Career ==
Diamond worked as a journalist. In 1884, he launched The Irish Tribune and in 1887 acquired the Glasgow Observer as well as The Catholic News, which he both amalgamated into The Catholic Herald, of which he was editor in charge until his death, aged 75, in 1934. In 1888 he founded the Weekly Herald, Catholic Educator and Manchester Citizen newspapers. In 1899, he bought the Aberdeen Catholic Herald. Throughout his life he established 37 weekly newspapers.

Diamond was an outspoken and controversial figure, described by one of his successors as "the kind of a man who made a good many enemies".

On 8 January 1920 he was arrested and charged with publication of an article in the Catholic Herald that allegedly encouraged assassination in Ireland. He was sentenced to six months imprisonment for the article, which was titled "Killing No Murder".

Diamond entered the British House of Commons as an Anti-Parnellite Nationalist in 1892, sitting for North Monaghan the following three years. He contested Peckham in the 1918 general election and Rotherhithe in the 1922 general election, as a Labour Party candidate, but was unsuccessful.

Extensive travels led him through Southern Africa, America and Southern Europe.

== Personal life and death ==
Diamond married Jeannie, only daughter of Jeremiah McCarthy, in 1882. He died on 19 February 1934.

== Footnotes ==
Parliament of the United Kingdom
Preceded by Pat O'Brien	Member of Parliament for North Monaghan; 1892 – 1895	Succeeded by Daniel MacAleese
