= James Lardner (politician) =

Irish politician (1879–1925)

James Carrige Rushe Lardner (22 May 1879 – 3 May 1925) was an Irish Nationalist Member of the Parliament of the United Kingdom for North Monaghan, 1907–18.

Born at the Diamond, Monaghan, he was the son of Hugh William Lardner, a traveller for a wine merchant, and Anne Loughran. He was educated at a Christian Brothers' school, at St Macartan's College, Monaghan, and at Clongowes Wood College, Co. Kildare. He became a solicitor in 1900 and a barrister in 1913, being a member of both King's Inns, Dublin, and Gray's Inn, London. He became a K.C. (King's Counsel) in 1921 and a bencher of King's Inns in 1924. In 1920 he married Rita, daughter of Sir Joseph Downes of South Hill, a Nationalist alderman and High Sheriff of Dublin and a director of Hibernian General Insurance. They had two sons. Lardner was chief ranger of the Irish National Foresters and a director of the Dublin and South Eastern Railway.

Lardner was elected unopposed for North Monaghan in a by-election in June 1907, although his nomination as the Nationalist candidate had been opposed by the powerful Joseph Devlin, whose Ancient Order of Hibernians was in competition with the Irish National Foresters. In the two general elections of 1910 Lardner was challenged by the Unionist Michael Elliott Knight, but won comfortably each time with 63% of the vote. He did not contest the general election of 1918.

Maume (1999, pp. 95, 233) states that Lardner had Healyite sympathies, but does not cite evidence. Barrington (1987, pp. 19–20) says that he was one of the Nationalist MPs who campaigned for legislation to improve Ireland's economic and social conditions. With J. J. Clancy he negotiated the Irish clauses of the National Insurance Act 1911 with the Treasury, and he was a member of the government committee appointed in 1913 to consider the extension of medical benefit to Ireland under the 1911 Act.

== Notes ==
Parliament of the United Kingdom
Preceded by Patrick O'Hare	Member of Parliament for North Monaghan; 1907–1918	Succeeded by Ernest Blythe
