= Edward Charles Thompson =

Edward Charles Thompson (1 April 1851 – 20 January 1933) was an Irish nationalist politician and member of parliament (MP) in the House of Commons of the United Kingdom of Great Britain and Ireland.

He was elected unopposed as the Irish Parliamentary Party MP for the North Monaghan constituency at the 1900 by-election, which was caused by the death of Daniel MacAleese. He did not contest the 1906 general election.

Parliament of the United Kingdom
Preceded by Daniel MacAleese	Member of Parliament for North Monaghan; 1900 – 1906	Succeeded by Patrick O'Hare
