= Patrick O'Hare =

Patrick O'Hare (1849–1917) was an Irish politician. At the 1906 general election, he was elected to the House of Commons of the United Kingdom of Great Britain and Ireland as Member of Parliament (MP) for North Monaghan. He resigned his seat in 1907 by becoming Steward of the Manor of Northstead.

Parliament of the United Kingdom
Preceded by Edward Charles Thompson	Member of Parliament for North Monaghan; 1906–1907	Succeeded by James Lardner
