= 1917 Kilkenny City by-election =

UK Parliamentary by-election

The 1917 Kilkenny City by-election was held on 10 August 1917. It followed the death of the incumbent Irish Parliamentary Party MP, Pat O'Brien. It was won by the Sinn Féin candidate W. T. Cosgrave, who defeated John Magennis, a three-time Mayor of Kilkenny. Cosgrave won while he was in prison for his role in the Easter Rising.

Magennis went on to be Mayor on three more occasions, while Cosgrave went on to serve for ten years as President of the Executive Council of the Irish Free State.

== Result ==
Kilkenny City by-election, 1917
Party	Candidate	Votes	%	±%
Sinn Féin	W. T. Cosgrave	772	66.3	New
Irish Parliamentary	John Magennis	392	33.7	N/A
Majority		380	32.6	N/A
Turnout		1,164	68.4	N/A
Sinn Féin gain from Irish Parliamentary		Swing	N/A	
