= 1900 North Monaghan by-election =

UK parliamentary by-election

The 1900 North Monaghan by-election was a parliamentary by-election held for the United Kingdom House of Commons constituency of North Monaghan on 21 December 1900. The vacancy arose because of the death of the sitting member, Daniel MacAleese of the Irish Parliamentary Party. Only one candidate was nominated, Edward Charles Thompson representing the Irish Parliamentary Party, who was elected unopposed.

== Result ==
1900 North Monaghan by-election
Party	Candidate	Votes	%	±%
Irish Parliamentary	Edward Charles Thompson	Unopposed	N/A	N/A
Irish Parliamentary hold				
