= 1907 North Monaghan by-election =

UK Parliamentary by-election

The 1907 North Monaghan by-election was held on 20 June 1907. The by-election was held due to the resignation of the incumbent Irish Parliamentary MP, Patrick O'Hare. It was won by the Irish Parliamentary candidate James Lardner.

Lardner was elected unopposed, although his nomination as the Nationalist candidate had been opposed by the powerful Joseph Devlin, whose Ancient Order of Hibernians was in competition with the Irish National Foresters.
