= 1886 North Monaghan by-election =

UK Parliamentary by-election

The 1886 North Monaghan by-election was a parliamentary by-election held for the United Kingdom House of Commons constituency of North Monaghan on 10 February 1886. Tim Healy of the Irish Parliamentary Party had won the seat in the general election of 1885, but having been elected also in South Londonderry, he chose to sit for the latter. The North Monaghan seat thus became vacant, and in the ensuing by-election, Patrick O'Brien of the Irish Parliamentary Party was elected, defeating his Conservative opponent, Dr Hall, by 4,015 votes to 2,551, a slightly increased majority from the general election.

By-election 1886: North Monaghan
Party	Candidate	Votes	%	±%
Irish Parliamentary	Pat O'Brien	4,015	61.1	+0.9
Irish Conservative	James Campbell Hall	2,551	38.9	−0.9
Majority		1,464	22.2	+1.8
Turnout		6,566	87.3	−2.3
Registered electors		7,525		
Irish Parliamentary hold		Swing	+0.9	
