= Kilmainham Treaty =

Informal agreement between William Gladstone and Charles Parnell

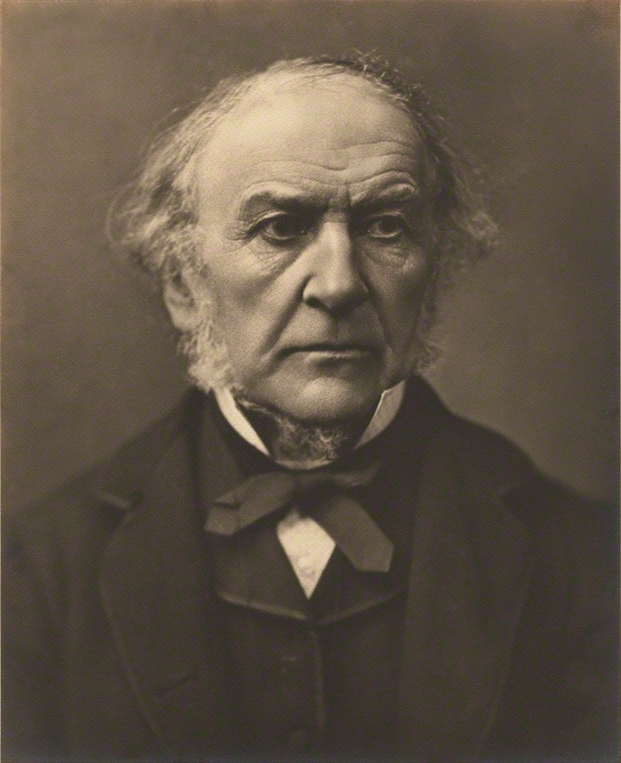
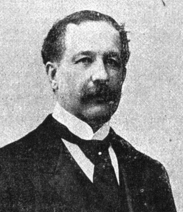
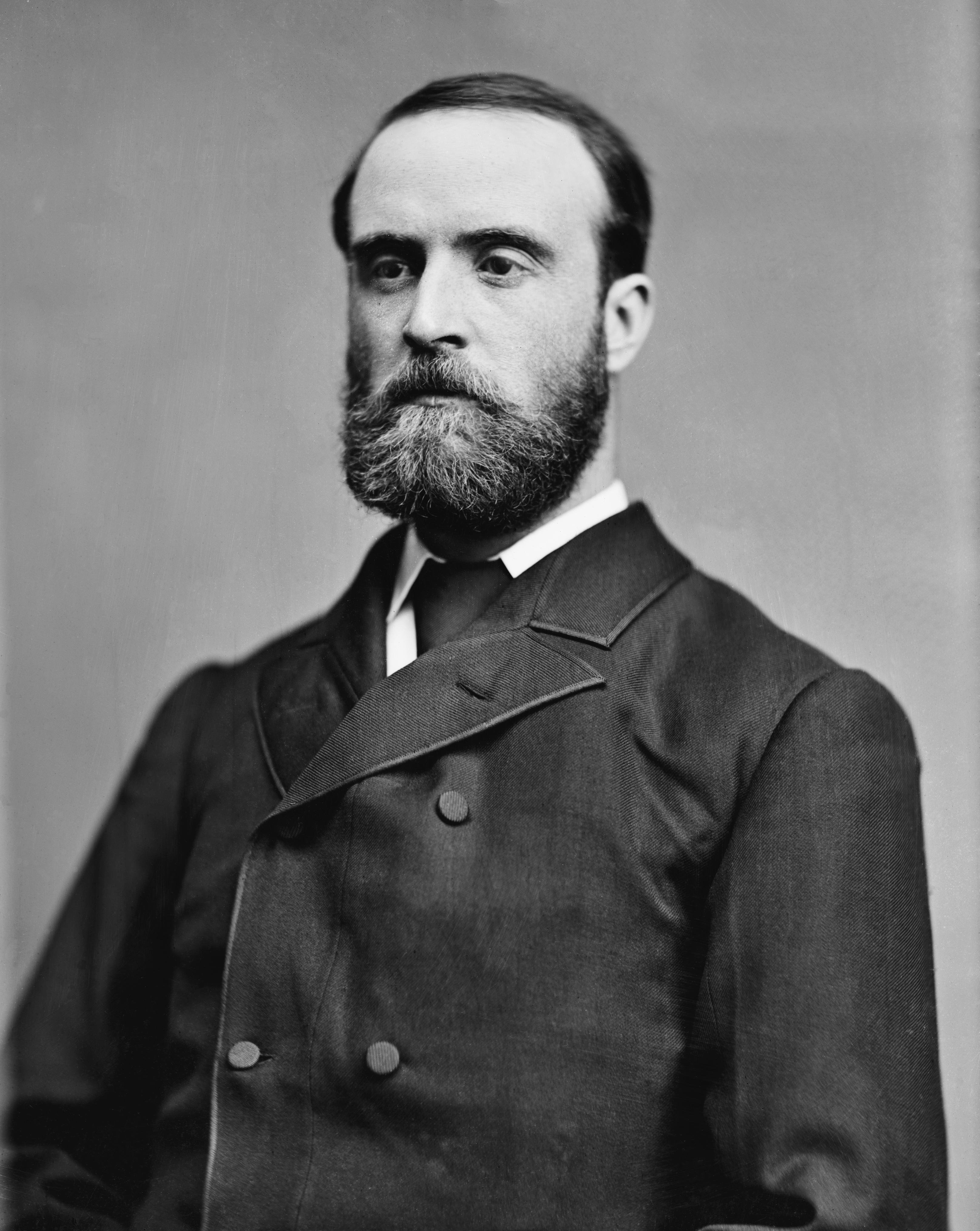
Gladstone (left) and Parnell (right) negotiated the agreement using O'Shea (middle) as an intermediary. Unknown to the government, O'Shea's wife was Parnell's lover.

The Kilmainham Treaty was an informal agreement reached in May 1882 between Liberal British prime minister William Ewart Gladstone and the Irish nationalist leader Charles Stewart Parnell. Whilst imprisoned in Kilmainham Gaol, Parnell moved in April 1882 to make a deal with the government, negotiated through Captain William O'Shea MP. The government would settle the "rent arrears" question allowing 100,000 tenants to appeal for fair rent before the land courts. Parnell promised to use his good offices to quell the violence and to co-operate cordially for the future with the Liberal Party in forwarding Liberal principles and measures of general reform. Gladstone released the prisoner and the agreement was a major triumph for Irish nationalism as it won abatement for tenant rent-arrears from the Government at the height of the Land War.

== Background ==
The agreement extended the terms of the Land Law (Ireland) Act 1881, with which Gladstone intended to make broad concessions to Irish tenant farmers. But the Act had many weaknesses and failed to satisfy Parnell and the Irish Land League because it did not provide a regulation for rent-arrears or rent-adjustments (in the case of poor harvests or deteriorated economic conditions).

After the Second Land Act became law on 22 August 1881, Parnell in a series of speeches in September and October launched violent attacks on William Forster the Chief Secretary for Ireland and even on Gladstone. Gladstone warned him not to frustrate the Act, but Parnell repeated his contempt for the Prime Minister. On 12 October the Cabinet, fully convinced that Parnell was bent on ruining the Act, took action to have him arrested the following day in Dublin.

Parnell was conveyed to Kilmainham Gaol, where he joined several other prominent members of the Land League who had also protested against the Act and been jailed. There, together with William O'Brien, he enacted the No Rent Manifesto campaign. He was well aware that some in the Liberal Cabinet—in particular Joseph Chamberlain—were opposed to the mass internment of suspects then taking place across Ireland under the Irish Coercion Act. The repressions did not have the desired effect, with the result that Forster became isolated within the Cabinet, and coercion became increasingly unpopular with the Liberal Party.

== Agreement ==
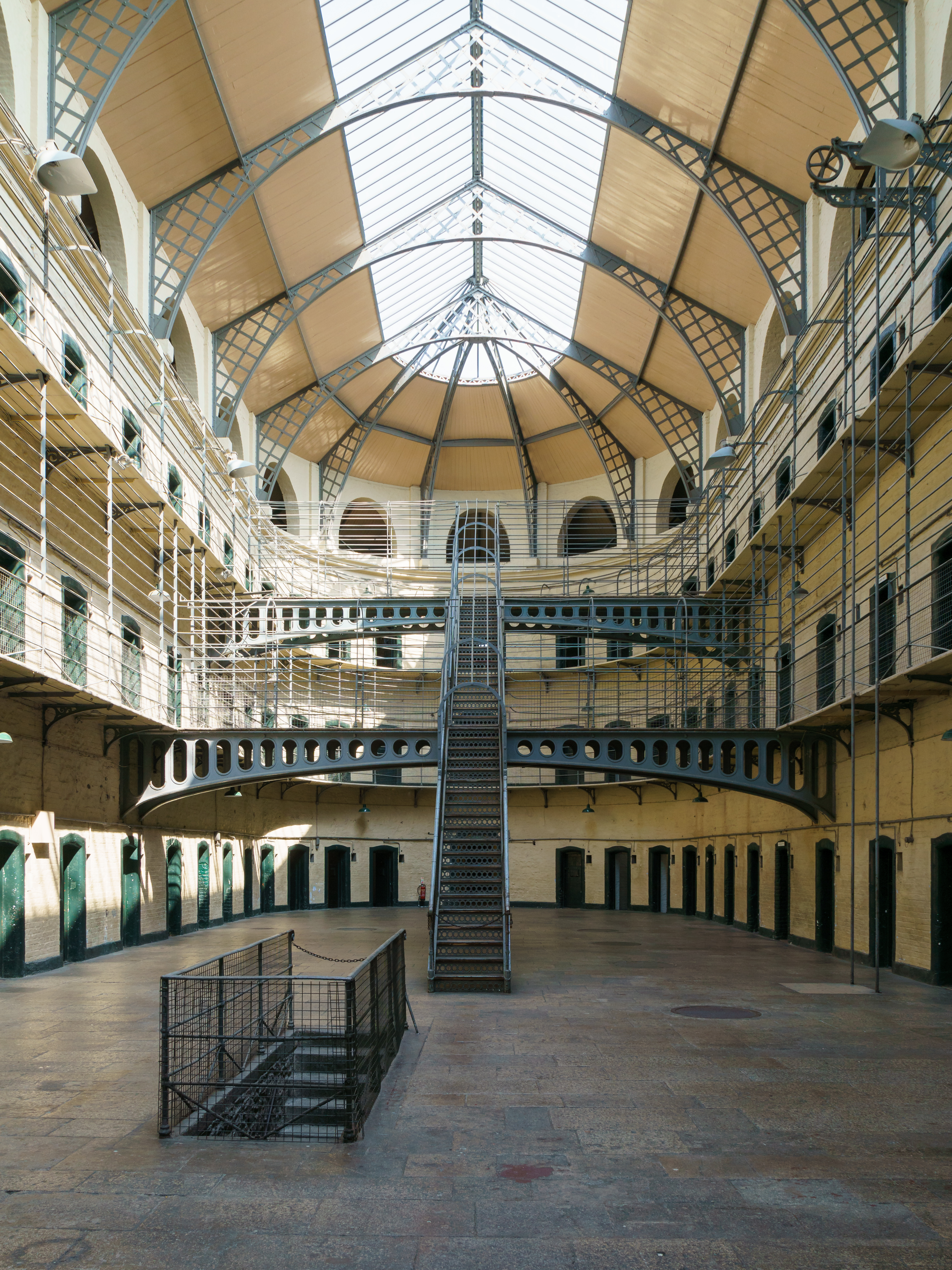
The main hall of Kilmainham gaol, where Parnell was kept, and which gave its name to the agreement.

In gaol Parnell had begun to turn over in his mind the possibility of coming to an arrangement with the Government. He had been corresponding with Mrs Katharine O'Shea who engaged her husband Captain O'Shea in April 1882 to act as a go-between for negotiations on behalf of Parnell. O'Shea contacted Gladstone on 5 May having been informed by Parnell that if the Government would settle the rent-arrears problem on the terms he proposed, he was confident that he would be able to curtail outrages (violent crimes). He further urged for the quick release of the League's organisers in the West, Sheridan and Boyton, who would then work for pacification. This shocked Forster, but impressed Gladstone.

Accordingly, on 2 May Gladstone informed the House of Commons of the release of Parnell and the resignation of Forster (who was replaced by Lord Frederick Cavendish). Gladstone always denied there had been a 'Kilmainham Treaty', merely accepting that he 'had received informations'. He kept his side of the arrangement by subsequently having the Arrears of Rent (Ireland) Act 1882 enacted. The government paid the landlords £800,000 in back rent owed by 130,000 tenant farmers.

== Results ==
Calling the agreement a "treaty" shows how Parnell placed a spin on the agreement in a way that strengthened Irish nationalism, since he had forced concessions from the British while in gaol. Since real treaties are usually signed between two states, it led to the idea that Ireland could become independent from Britain. After the 'treaty' was agreed, those imprisoned with Parnell were then released from gaol. This transformed Parnell from a respected leader to a national hero.

Four days after the Treaty the two top British officials in Ireland were assassinated by an Irish nationalist group known as the Irish National Invincibles. This event became known as the Phoenix Park murders, and undid much of the goodwill generated in Britain by the Kilmainham Treaty. Though strongly condemned by Parnell, the murders showed that he could not control nationalist "outrages" as he had undertaken to do. Frank Byrne, one of the leaders of the Invincibles, had in fact been an aide to Parnell as well as secretary of the Irish Home Rule League and the Irish National Land League. After the murders, Byrne escaped to Paris. Parnell was said to have given Byrne £100 to finance the escape, but Parnell denied involvement in the Invincibles and any of their activities.
