= Irishtown, County Mayo =

Irishtown An Baile Gaelach
- Village
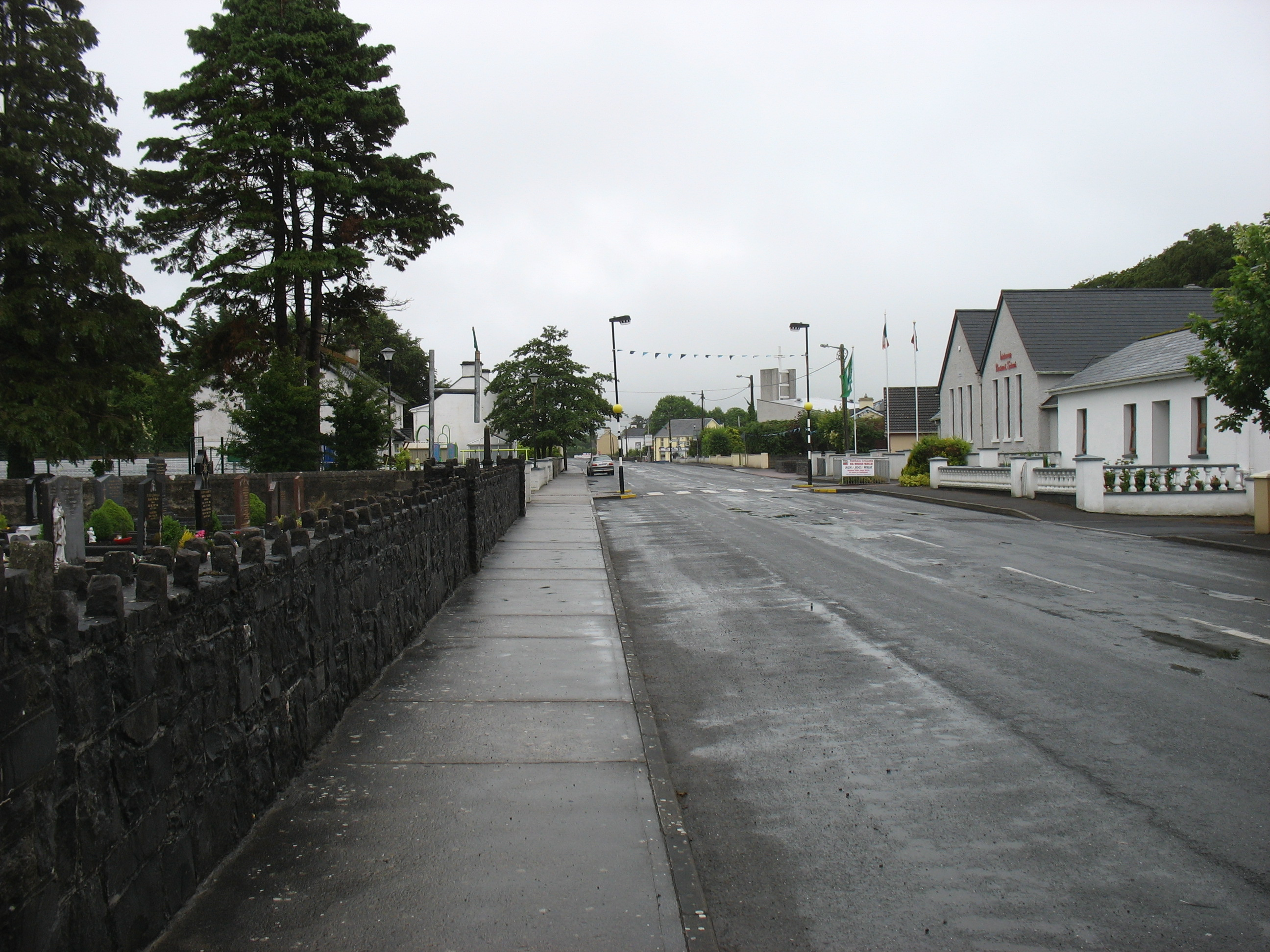
- Main street of Irishtown

- Location in Ireland
- Coordinates: 53°39′46″N 08°53′20″W
- Country: Ireland
- Province: Connacht
- County: County Mayo

Population (2022)
  - Total: 182
- Time zone: UTC+0 (WET)
  - Summer (DST): UTC-1 (IST (WEST))

Irishtown (Irish: An Baile Gaelach) is a village in County Mayo, Ireland, located on the southern county border with County Galway about halfway between Claremorris and Tuam on the R328 regional road. Irishtown is in the Civil Parish of Crossboyne, Barony of Clanmorris and the Catholic Diocese of Tuam. It is sometimes referred to as 'The Cradle of the Land League' due to its connections with the founding of the Irish National Land League.

== Demographics ==
Irishtown was designated as a census town by the Central Statistics Office for the first time in the 2016 census, when its population was 129 people and by the 2022 census this had risen to 182.

== Land League ==
Local tenant farmers were threatened with eviction from their holdings on the estate of the local parish priest, The Very Rev. Geoffrey Canon Burke, and in response a meeting took place on 20 April 1879 that brought about a reversal of the potential evictions as well as a 20 percent reduction in rent. The meeting was the genesis of what would later that year become the Land League.

== Amenities and sport ==
There are several facilities situated in the village, including the national (primary) school, community centre, church, corner shop, one pub, playground and playing fields, the former being renovated in 2010. The primary school, Irishtown National School, had an enrollment of over 60 children as of 2021.

Gaelic football is the predominant sport in the area. In 1973, Irishtown and its neighbouring village, Ballindine, amalgamated to form Davitts GAA club. The club won two Mayo Intermediate titles in 1981 and 2011, and were crowned Connacht Intermediate Football Champions in 2011.

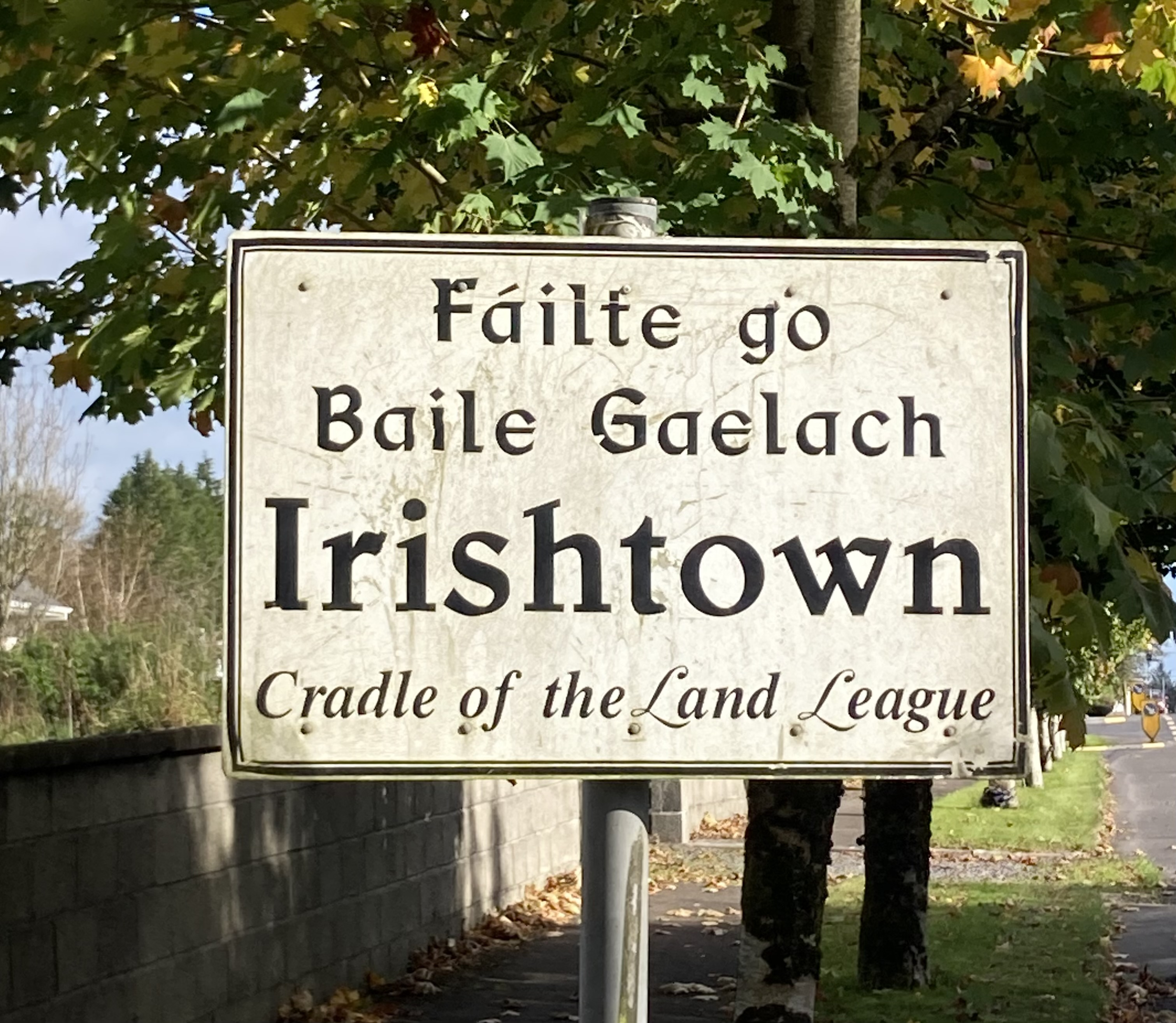
Land League Welcome!

== See also ==
- James Daly (1838–1911), activist known for work with the Irish National Land League.
