= Patrick Egan (activist) =

American diplomat (1841–1919)

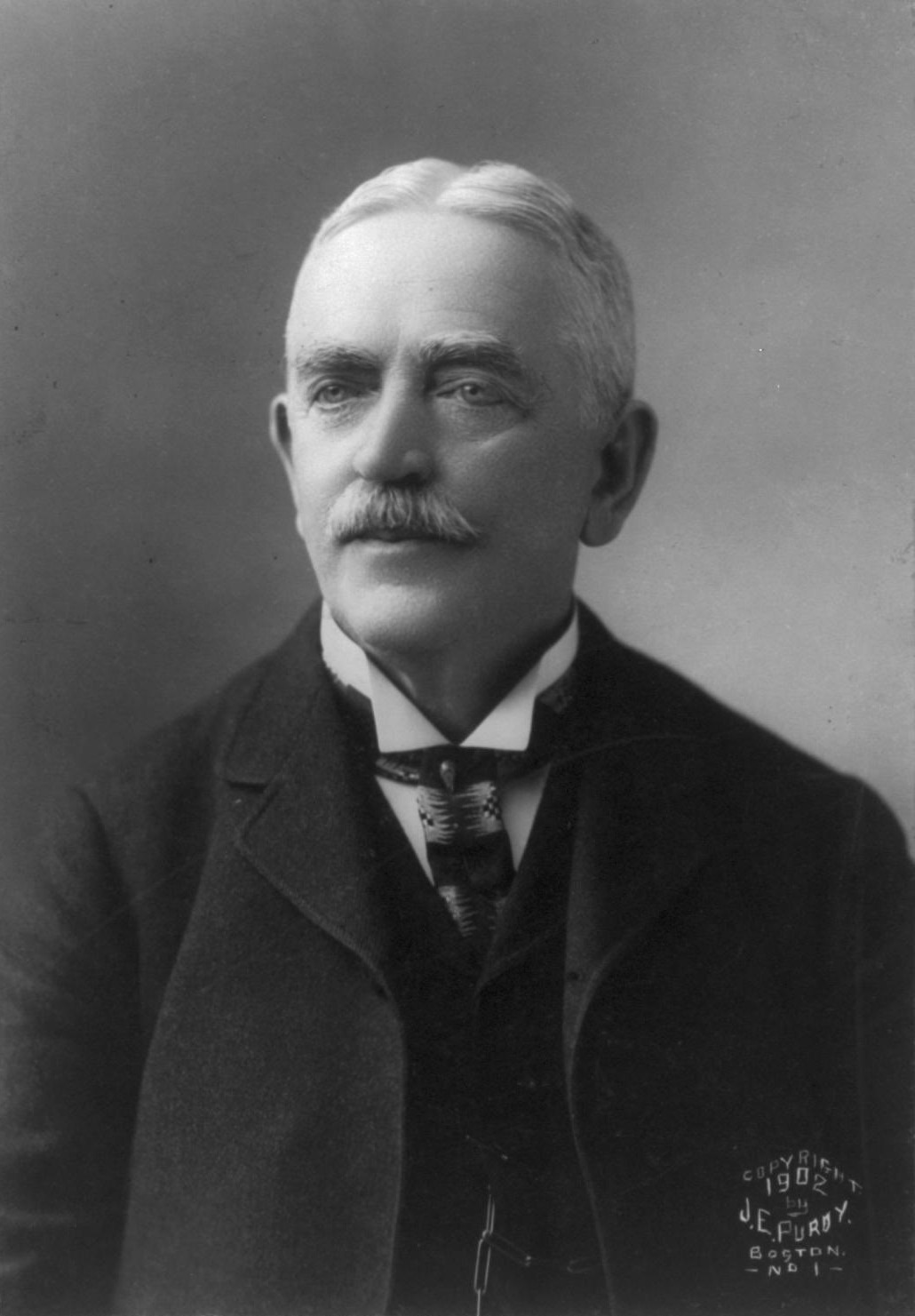
Patrick Egan

Patrick Egan (13 August 1841 – 30 September 1919) was an Irish and American political leader.

== Early life ==
Egan was born in Ballymahon, County Longford, Ireland. His family later moved to Dublin, and at the age of fourteen, he entered the office of an extensive grain and milling firm, the North City Milling Company. Before he was twenty, he had been promoted to the post of chief bookkeeper and confidential man. Later, he was elected managing director of the firm, as a stock company, it being the most extensive one in Ireland. He was, at the same time, senior partner in the most extensive bakery establishment in the county. He had been an industrious learner before going into business, and took evening classes from various instructors, particularly a brilliant young Episcopal minister named Porte.

== Irish Nationalism ==
Egan became involved with the Irish Republican Brotherhood soon after its establishment. In 1873, he was treasurer of the Irish Republican Brotherhood, and with the IRB's supported, participated in the establishment of the Home Rule League with fellow IRB Supreme Council members John O'Connor Power, Joseph Biggar and John Barry. In 1877, he and others, including Power, Biggar and Barry, resigned from the Brotherhood over the condemnation by its leaders of the use of politics within a revolutionary organisation.

At its foundation in 1879, Egan was elected treasurer of the Irish Land League. He was a close associate of Michael Davitt and Charles Stewart Parnell. At the end of 1880, he, with twelve others, including Parnell, Dillon, Bigger, Sexton, Sullivan, Sheridan, and Matt Harris, were singled out by the government for prosecution for alleged conspiracy. After a costly trial of sixteen days, the jury convicted two and acquitted ten. The government did not dare arraign them again, but brought in a bill to suspend the Habeas Corpus Act, and to permit the arrest of any one obnoxious to the government, intending to proscribe all members of the League.

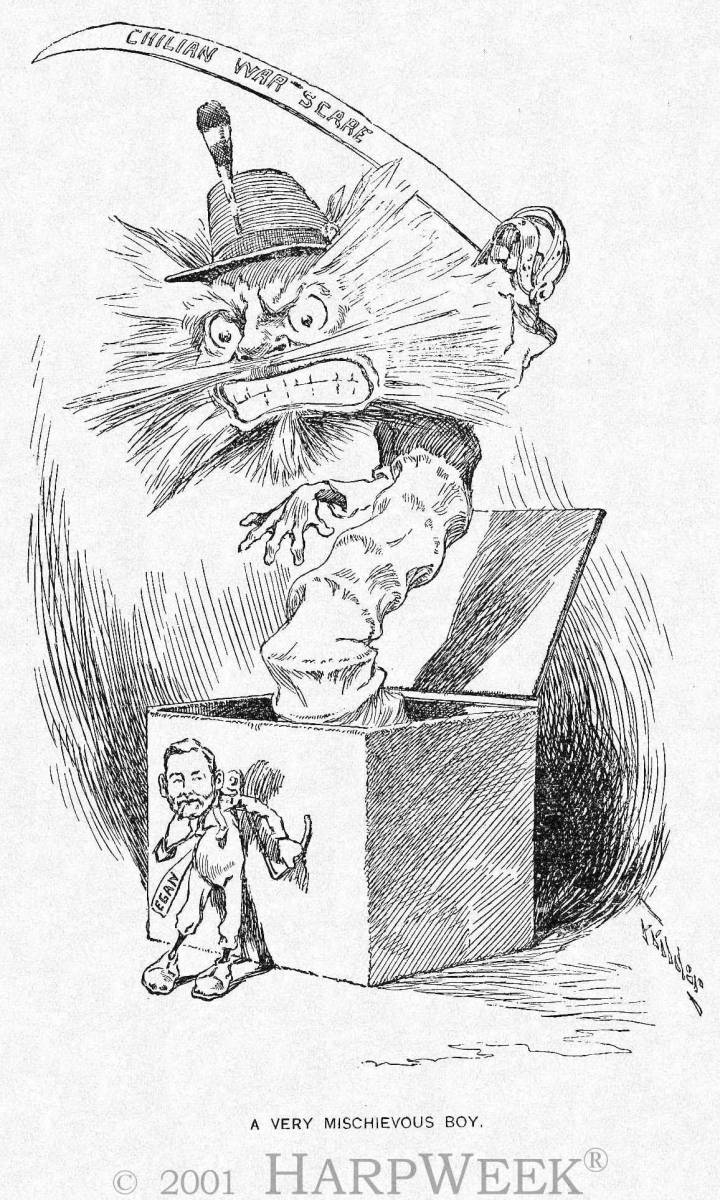
"A very mischievous boy": Egan tries to provoke a war between the US and Chile (Harper's Weekly, 14 November 1891).

Following the arrest of Parnell, Egan signed the No Rent Manifesto of 18 October 1881, in his function as treasurer of the Land League. That led to the proscription of the League by the British government. Egan fled to Paris with the organisation's funds in order to prevent their confiscation by the authorities. He remained in Paris from February 1881 to the end of 1882.

Between 1880 and 1882, Egan was nominated a number of times for election to parliament, and was twice unanimously nominated, once for Queen's County and again for County Meath. However, he declined because he would not take the oath of allegiance to the Crown required by the government.

== In the United States ==
Learning that the government was conspiring to arrest him and colleagues, and make him the victim of a show trial, he quietly fled to the Netherlands, and later to the United States, settling in Lincoln, Nebraska, where he continued to work strenuously for the Irish Land League and Irish home rule. In 1881, he was elected president of the National Executive Committee of the Irish National League of America, at its convention in Boston.

Egan was instrumental in exposing the Piggott forgeries. He gave an interview to The New York Times in October 1888, predicting that the case against Parnell being prosecuted in The Times of London would be demolished:

Nothing new has developed yet to talk about. What has been said so far is simply a rehash of charges, without proof, that has been made for the last five years. But wait until the evidence for Parnell is produced. The whole Times' case will be exploded and indisputable evidence produced which will show Parnell guiltless and the true character of the allegations against him. You may expect some sensational testimony ... I have no doubt of the complete vindication of Parnell and all his associates and this will greatly injure the government.

Egan subsequently became involved in American politics and was a minor power in the Republican Party, until he became a supporter of William Jennings Bryan and the Democratic Party in 1896.

As United States Ambassador to Chile from 1889 to 1893, he represented the US when relations became strained during the revolt against President José Manuel Balmaceda. He caused the Baltimore Crisis, and sought to provoke the United States into a war of colonisation against Chile. The general Chilean attitude was probably best expressed by Eduardo Phillips, chief of the Diplomatic Section of the Ministry of Foreign Relations who, in a letter to a newspaper, described Egan as a person "utterly lacking in all elements of culture and courtesy, and ever-ready to descend to the level of invective and calumny".

Egan supported John Redmond and the Irish Volunteers in his final years. In an interview with the New York Times, following the executions of the leaders of the 1916 Easter Rising, he declared:

Ninety-eight per cent of all Irishmen were not in sympathy with the revolt, and England had nothing to gain by shooting people after it is over ... If anyone were shot it should have been John Devoy who hatched the whole nefarious scheme here in New York and was personally responsible for it.

Egan was the father of fourteen children, nine of whom survived childhood. His residence in Lincoln was located at 1447 Q street.

Diplomatic posts
Preceded by William R. Roberts	United States Ambassador to Chile; 9 August 1889 – 4 July 1893	Succeeded by James D. Porter
