= Coercion Act =

Act to suppress popular discontent

A Coercion Act was an Act of Parliament that gave a legal basis for increased state powers to suppress popular discontent and disorder. The label was applied, especially in Ireland, to acts passed from the 18th to the early 20th century by the Irish, British, and Northern Irish parliaments.

== London ==
In December 1816, a mass meeting took place at Spa Fields near London. The Coercion Act 1817 was an act of Parliament that suspended habeas corpus and extended existing laws against seditious gatherings in Britain. The Coercion Act 1817 was the result of this mass meeting.

== Ireland ==
The total number of "Coercion Acts" relating to Ireland is a matter of definition, including whether to count separately an act which continues an expiring act. Michael Farrell in 1986 put the total from 1801 to 1921 at 105. John Spencer, 5th Earl Spencer said in the House of Lords that 87 such acts had been passed between the Acts of Union 1801 and 1887, a rate of one per year. The figure was repeated by John Redmond, whereas a writer in a Union Defence League pamphlet put the figure at 76 between 1801 and 1908, plus 22 during Grattan's Parliament (1782–1800).

Some of the more notable Irish Coercion Acts were the Local Disturbances, etc. (Ireland) Act 1833 (3 & 4 Will. 4. c. 4), the Protection of Life and Property in Certain Parts of Ireland Act 1871 (34 & 35 Vict. c. 25), and the Protection of Person and Property Act 1881 (44 & 45 Vict. c. 4).

An Irish Coercion Bill was proposed by Sir Robert Peel on 15 May 1846 in order to calm the increasingly difficult situation in Ireland as a result of the ongoing famine there. The bill was blocked, and this led, in part, to Peel's resignation as Prime Minister.

From 1874, attempts to introduce other Irish coercion acts were blocked by the "obstructionism" (filibustering) of Joseph Biggar.

The Protection of Persons and Property (Ireland) Act 1881 allowed for internment without trial of those suspected of involvement in the Land War. It was strongly opposed by the Irish Parliamentary Party (IPP), which filibustered the second reading for 41 hours. Eventually, the Speaker of the House of Commons, Henry Brand, resorted to ignoring IPP members of Parliament who requested the right of speech and put the question, a controversial move that allowed Prime Minister William Gladstone to pass the act. A total of 953 people were detained under the act. Many of them were active in the Irish National Land League; this was sufficient for the "reasonable suspicion" required by the act. On 13 October 1881, IPP leader Charles Stewart Parnell was arrested under the act after his newspaper, the United Ireland, had attacked the Land Law (Ireland) Act 1881.

As a response to the Plan of Campaign of the mid-1880s the new Chief Secretary for Ireland, Arthur Balfour, secured the Criminal Law and Procedure (Ireland) Act 1887 or "Perpetual Crimes Act", a Coercion Act aimed at the prevention of boycotting, intimidation, unlawful assembly and the organisation of conspiracies against the payment of agreed rents. The act resulted in the imprisonment of hundreds of people including over twenty MPs. The act was condemned by the Catholic hierarchy since it was to become a permanent part of the law and did not have to be renewed annually by Parliament, but Pope Leo XIII issued the bull Saepe Nos in 1888 which was uncritical of the acts. Trial by jury was abolished. An influential analysis of the pros and cons of the Act was published in 1888 by William Henry Hurlbert, a Catholic Irish-American author.

Many hundreds were imprisoned at times under the acts, including many prominent politicians and agrarian agitators, Joseph Biggar, Alexander Blane, Michael Davitt, John Dillon, James Gilhooly, Patrick Guiney, Matthew Harris, John Hayden, John Hooper, J. E. Kenny, Andrew Kettle, Denis Kilbride, Pat O'Brien, William O'Brien, James O'Kelly, Charles Stewart Parnell, Douglas Pyne, Willie Redmond, and Timothy Sullivan.
