= Anna Catherine Parnell =

19th/20th-century Irish nationalist

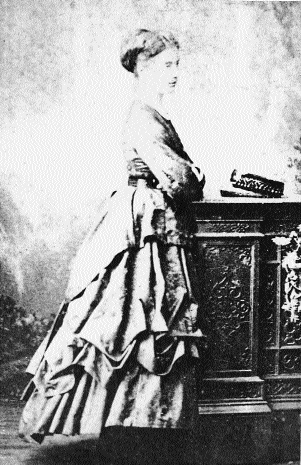
- Anna Parnell in Limerick (c. 1878)
- Born: Catherine Maria Anna Mercer Parnell; 13 May 1852; Avondale House, Rathdrum, County Wicklow, Ireland
- Died: 20 September 1911 (aged 59); Ilfracombe, Devon, England
- Resting place: Holy Trinity Church, Ilfracombe
- Father: John Henry Parnell
- Relatives: Charles Stewart Parnell (brother); Fanny Parnell (sister); John Howard Parnell (brother)

Anna Catherine Parnell (13 May 1852 – 20 September 1911) was an Irish nationalist and leader of the Ladies' Land League. Anna was a "radical and militant" woman, who was a trail blazer for challenging barriers between men and women within political spaces, and held a strong role for advocacy into women's rights in government and parliamentary roles. Irish Nationalist leader Charles Stewart Parnell was her older brother.

== Early life ==
Anna was born Catherine Maria Anna Mercer Parnell at Avondale House in Rathdrum, County Wicklow, Ireland on 13 May 1852. She was the tenth of eleven children of John Henry Parnell, a landlord and Delia Tudor Stewart Parnell, an Irish-American and the daughter of Admiral Charles Stewart (1778–1869) of the US Navy. She had very little formal education as a child, but the family had an extensive library which she was encouraged to read by her mother. After her father died in 1859 Anna moved with the family to County Wicklow, Dublin. Delia Parnell was an active socialite while in Dublin and exposed her children to a wide variety of political views. Anna wrote poetry and painted. In 1865, the family moved to Paris, but Anna felt stifled by upper class society rules imposed upon her. She was in Paris when the Franco-Prussian War broke out in 1870 and was active in the American Ladies' Committee fundraising and setting up hospitals. Returning to Dublin, she enrolled in the School of Art of the Royal Dublin Society.

== Early political activism ==
Anna moved to London in 1875 to continue studying art at the South Kensington School of Design. Parnell was initially successful at art, but she did not pursue a career as a painter, and her known paintings are in private collections in Ireland. Anna's origin of political interest is difficult to pin-point, having a range of political influences growing up, including that of her father, her grandfather (William Parnell), and her brother Charles, who was elected as an MP for Meath in her early life. Her sister, Fanny Parnell (1848-1882), was also someone who shared an interest in politics, with both sisters growing up with an interest in political involvement.

She frequently visited Parliament during debates, sitting in the Ladies' Gallery of the House of Commons, Westminster. She wrote articles about the debates in a column titled Notes From the Ladies' Cage in the Celtic Monthly. Due to Anna being a "more constant frequenter" of Parliament, she "knew how to secure one of the few front seats" granted to women within 1877. Due to the women's viewing gallery being created with a large "latticed metal screen, heavily ornamented and gilded", the women, including Anna and her sister Fanny, who attempted to view Parliament proceedings, were often blocked and "effectively prevented" from "seeing or hearing clearly what transpired below". The adorned nature of the viewing gallery also inspired Anna's title for her Notes From the Ladies' Cage column.

In 1879 Anna joined her Fanny in New York where they raised money in support of the Irish National Land League. The sisters worked closely with their brother Charles and Michael Davitt but were critical of how the funds raised in America were being used in Ireland. In October 1880, the sisters founded the New York Ladies' Land League with their mother as president.

== Ladies' Land League ==
Anna returned to Dublin in late 1880. When it seemed that the Land League men were likely to be arrested, it was suggested that a women's league in Ireland could take over the work in their absence. Public opinion at the time was against women in politics, but the Ladies' Land League was founded on 31 January 1881 with Anna as its effective leader.

When Charles Parnell and other leaders were imprisoned in 1881, as predicted, the Ladies' Land League took over their work. Though it was envisioned as a placeholder until the men were released, Anna organised branches throughout Ireland, encouraging women to play an active role in Land League activities. Offices were given to the ladies but little help. Many women, including Anna herself, were made out to be "lunatic extremists", both in their willingness to be involved within the political sphere, and the ferocity of their advocacy. They raised funds for the League and for the support of prisoners and their families. They distributed Land League wooden huts to shelter evicted tenant families and by the beginning of 1882 they had 500 branches, thousands of women members and considerable publicity. They distributed £60,000 (equivalent to about £6,240,000 in 2025) in relief aid.

Anna as appointed leader of the League, held frequent addresses to various audiences around Ireland. She held hopes of support from rural Irish men and women of the League in a speech Anna gave in 1881, stating that it was the first "kind of political organisation amongst women...in Ireland", hoping for its success and longevity. Anna commented on the rare nature of having an organisation such as the Ladies' Land League, commenting how "the responsibility has never been thrown on the people themselves before-it always rested more or less with their leaders; and the responsibility of failure, if it rested with anyone, rested more with the leaders than with the people". Anna continues in her speech celebrating that "a great deal of future success depends on the women", and that women in the communities she spoke to, had a role in supporting the movement too.

The League was proclaimed an illegal organisation in December 1881, with a last mass meeting on 1 January 1882. This put the Ladies' Land League in serious debt. Anna approached Charles, requesting money to settle the debts. Charles, who distrusted Anna's understanding of politics, agreed to provide the money under the condition that the Ladies' Land League be disbanded. Anna agreed, disbanding in 1882, but she never forgave Charles and never spoke to him again.

Andrew Kettle stated that Anna had "a better knowledge of the social and political forces of Ireland than any person, man or woman, I have ever met. She would have worked the Land League revolution to a much better conclusion than her great brother". Despite this, recorded sources of Anna and her achievements are "rather scanty", and apart from mentions in "family memoirs", many references to Anna and her sister Fanny are embedded within "biographies of their brother" Charles.

== Later life & Legacy ==
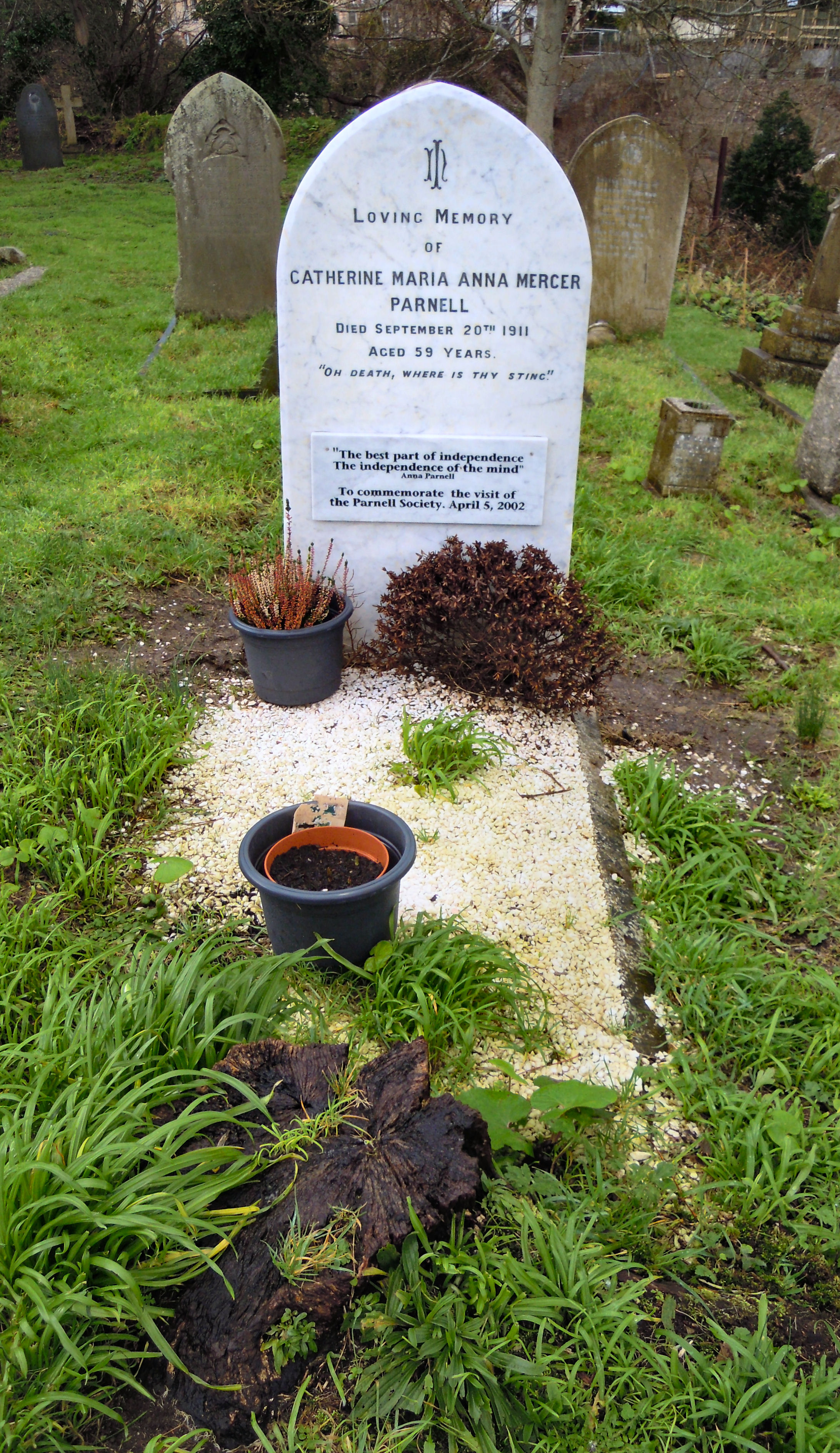
The grave of Anna Catherine Parnell in the churchyard of Holy Trinity Church, Ilfracombe

After her brother's death in 1891 Anna lived the rest of her life in the south of England. She remained friends with former members of the League, and continued to have an interest in Irish affairs. She supported Helen Taylor's successful campaign to run for parliament in 1885. She relied on the small but unreliable annuity from her brother, John Howard Parnell. She was able to supplement her income with the publication of her volume of poetry, Old tales and new (1905). She wrote an angry account of her Land League experiences in Tale of a Great Sham, in reaction to Davitt's Fall of feudalism (1904), but it was not published until 1986. She made one last political appearance when she campaigned for a Sinn Féin candidate in a 1908 by-election. She made plans for the publication of Tale of a Great Sham in the journal of Inghinidhe na hÉireann, Bean na hÉireann. She paid the fine that the editor, Helena Molony, received for protesting the royal visit in 1911 to ensure that Molony could continue to work.

Parnell received a small inheritance from her mother's estate in 1910, and moved to Ilfracombe, Devon living under the assumed name Cerisa Palmer. She accidentally drowned at Ilfracombe on 20 September 1911 at the age of 59 while swimming at the Tunnels open-air baths. She was buried in Holy Trinity churchyard on 23 September. Shortly after her death, a former member of the Children's Land League, JP Dunne, called for Parnell to be repatriated for burial in Glasnevin Cemetery, Dublin. The manuscript of Tale of a Great Sham is held in the National Library of Ireland.

Anna is recognised as being a pioneer in questioning the public's perception of "what the proper role for women in politics might be and she showed by example that women did not have to stop being feminine to be effective". This remains to be her legacy today, advocating for the rights of the Irish people, whilst challenging the feminine ideals held during her time.

== Commemoration ==
In September 2021, 110 years after her death, Anna Parnell was honoured with a blue plaque on the Allied Irish Bank wall at the top of O’Connell Street, in Dublin city centre, the site of the Ladies Land League which she founded with her sister Fanny in 1881. Historian Margaret Ward has called for Parnell's body to be repatriated to Ireland.
