= John Parnell (cricketer) =

Anglo-Irish cricketer

John Henry Parnell (14 August 1811 – 3 August 1859) was an Anglo-Irish cricketer with amateur status who was active in 1831. He was born in Avondale, County Wicklow and died in Dublin. He made his debut in 1831 and appeared in one match as an unknown handedness batsman whose bowling style is unknown, playing for Cambridge University. He scored 25 runs with a highest score of 22* and took no wickets.

Parnell was born to William Parnell-Hayes and his wife Frances Howard. A grandson of Sir John Parnell, 2nd Baronet, Parnell was educated at Eton and Trinity College, Cambridge. In 1834 he married Delia Tudor Stewart (1816–1898), daughter of Commodore (later Admiral) Charles Stewart, U.S. Navy. They had eleven children including the Irish nationalist politicians Charles Stewart Parnell and John Howard Parnell, Irish nationalist and leader of the Ladies' Land League Anna Catherine Parnell, and Irish nationalist and poet Fanny Parnell. John Parnell was High Sheriff of Wicklow in 1836.

== Bibliography ==
- Haygarth, Arthur (1996) [1862]. Scores & Biographies, Volume 1 (1744–1826). Kennington: Frederick Lillywhite. ISBN 978-19-00592-23-9.
- Haygarth, Arthur (1997) [1862]. Scores & Biographies, Volume 2 (1827–1840). Kennington: Frederick Lillywhite. ISBN 978-19-00592-23-9.
