= Avondale House =

Birthplace of Irish nationalist leader, Charles Stewart Parnell

Coordinates: 52°54′48″N 6°13′22″W

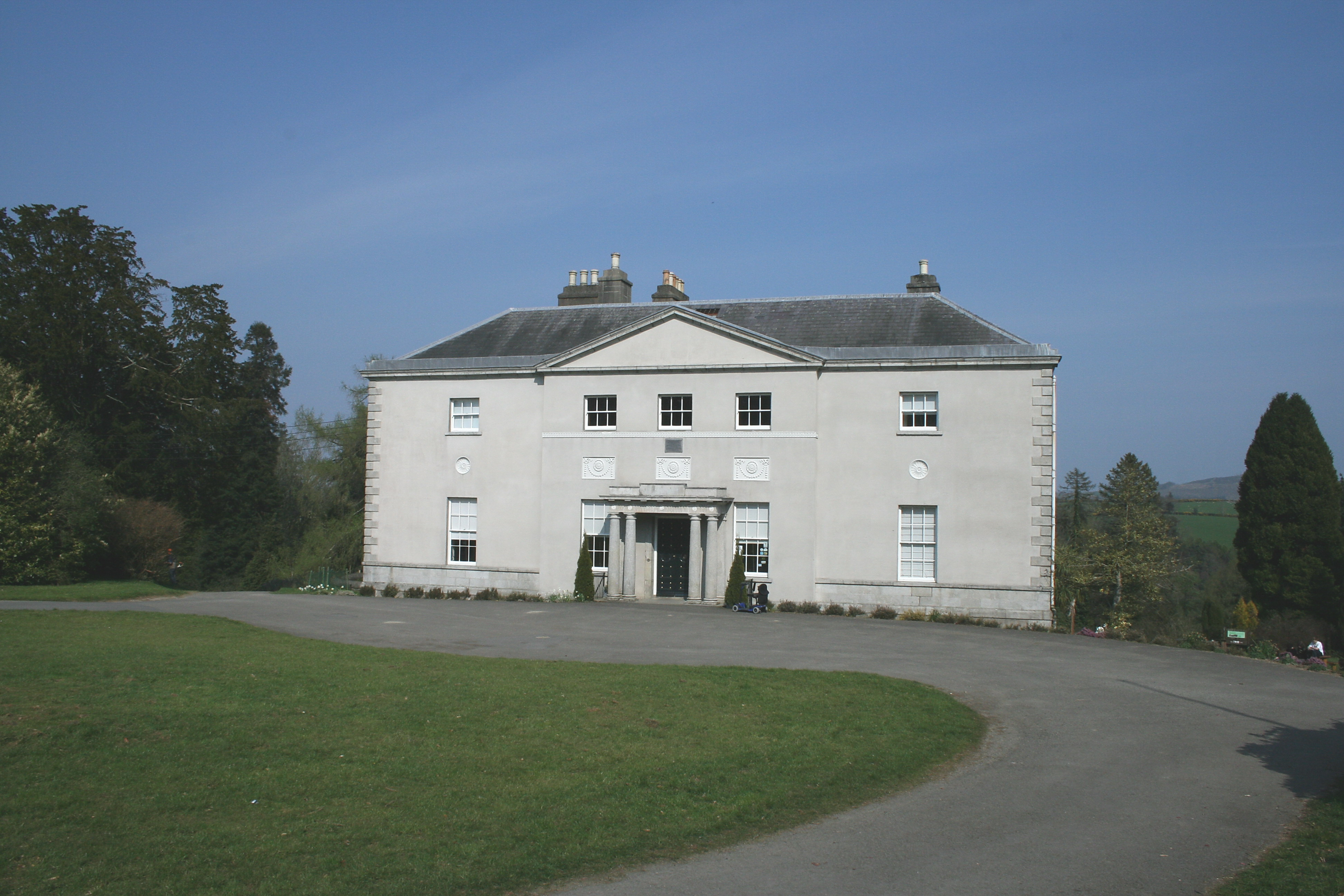
- Front façade of Avondale House

General information
- Architectural style: Georgian
- Location: Avondale Forest, Rathdrum, County Wicklow, Ireland
- Completed: 1779

Technical details
- Floor count: 2 over basement

Design and construction
- Architects: James Wyatt; Samuel Hayes
- Developer: Samuel Hayes

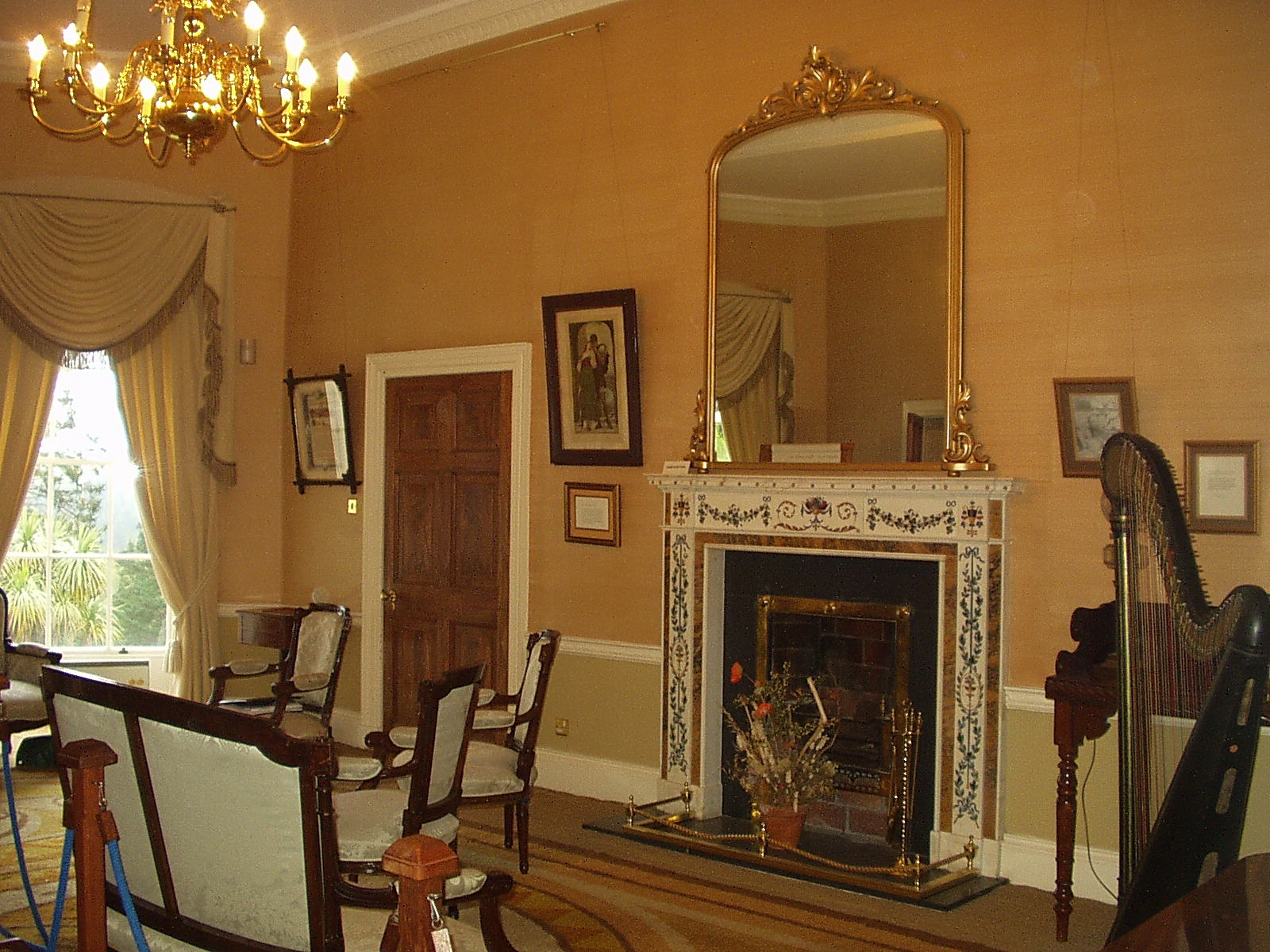
The drawing room, with some of the house's original furniture

Avondale House is a Georgian house and the birthplace and home of Charles Stewart Parnell in Avondale, County Wicklow, Ireland. It is set in the Avondale Forest Park, spanning over 2 km^{2} (490 acres) of land, approximately 1.5 km from the nearby town of Rathdrum. The river Avonmore flows through the park on its way towards the Irish Sea. The house is now a museum.

== History ==
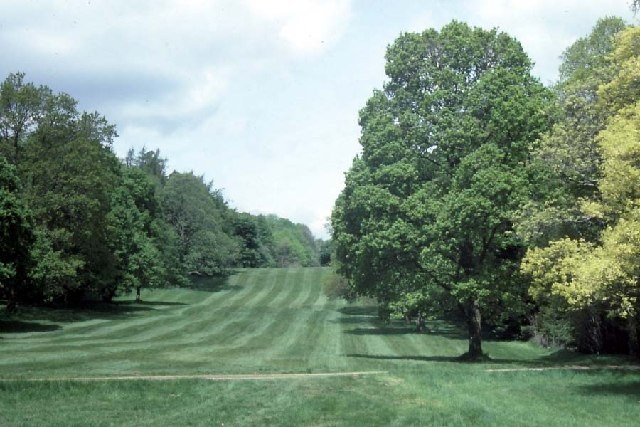
Grounds of the house in 1986

Avondale House was built in 1777 for Samuel Hayes, a barrister who wrote a book on Irish Forestry and was a pioneer of the re-afforestation of Ireland, planting many thousands of trees on the estate. He died childless in 1795 leaving the estate to his cousin Sir John Parnell, 2nd Baronet, with the condition that it pass to a younger son. On Sir John's death in 1801, his third son, William, inherited and changed his surname to Parnell-Hayes. Charles Stewart Parnell, his grandson, was born there in 1846 and inherited in 1859. After Parnell's death in 1891 the estate was sold to a Dublin butcher from Phibsboro who felled most of the trees to recoup his investment.

The house is Georgian, probably designed by James Wyatt and built in 1777. It is notable for its fine plasterwork and still contains many original pieces of furniture. The American Room is dedicated to Admiral Charles Stewart (1778-1869), Parnell's American grandfather who commanded the USS Constitution (now moored in Boston Harbor) during the War of 1812. The outside of the house is featured in a painting in the R. Barry O'Brien 1898 biography of Parnell.

In 1898, the Parnell Monument Committee was founded in Dublin, whose aim was to raise funds to erect a monument to Parnell in the capital as well as to purchase Avondale for the state. On 11 October 1899, the Lord Mayor of Dublin Daniel Tallon, John Redmond MP, and others left Dublin for the United States via steamship from Queenstown for the purposes of fundraising. On their return, having successfully raised £6,000, the Lord Mayor spoke to the Cork Examiner about their plans:

Our first intention is to purchase Avondale, the residence of the late Parnell, together with the demesne and grounds, amounting to about 200 acres. We will then vest them in trustees for the use of the Parnell family during their lives, and after their death they will be the gift of the Irish people. The members of the Parnell family who will enjoy the gift are Mr John Howard Parnell and Mrs. Dickinson, his sister. By this scheme we will preserve to the Irish people the residence which is so closely associated with the illustrious Irishman who occupied it, and it will therefore become a National possession.

The woodlands were renewed in 1904 when the estate was bought by the government. The house was used as a forestry school and the grounds planted with a great variety of trees, the most successful being conifers from the Pacific coast of North America. The grounds now contain specimens of giant redwoods from California and Sitka spruce from British Columbia. The ruins of Parnell's old sawmill and Parnell's well are located on the site.

== Access and conservation ==
Avondale House is open for guided tours which include tours of the historic house and the former forestry school.

In 2019, Fáilte Ireland announced a major restoration project for Avondale House and Forest Park. In July 2022, President Michael D. Higgins officially opened "Beyond the Trees Avondale", described as a new world-class visitor destination at Avondale Forest Park. Facilities in Beyond the Trees Avondale include a tree canopy walk as well as gift shop, picnic areas, walled garden and children's playground. There are also several walking trails in the forest park. One of the site's attractions is a trackless forest train that runs through the park. The refurbished Avondale House was re-opened to visitors in 2023.

As of 2024, the trademark rights associated with "Beyond the Trees Avondale" were the subject of a lawsuit between Coillte and Davey Parnell (a distant relative of the Parnells of Avondale who lives in Dunshaughlin).
