= Central Board =

The Central Board was a scheme proposed in the mid-1880s to provide for the devolution of some legislative powers from the Westminster Parliament in England to a proposed elected body (a board) in Ireland. It was proposed to partially address the concerns of the Irish Home Rule movement. It was never pursued, and was superseded by the First Home Rule Bill in 1886.

== Background ==
After the Act of Union 1800, Ireland was under direct rule from England. While some Catholic emancipation efforts had slightly improved the position of native Irish Catholics, Daniel O'Connell's broader campaign for a Repeal of the Union (of the 1830s and 1840s) had failed.

By the 1870s and 1880s, a struggle for reform of land ownership had taken center stage. While several Irish Land Acts were passed, there was still a call to create meaningful political structures which would have introduced a measure of self-government to Ireland. The form of these structures was a matter of division and debate.

The "Central Board" scheme was a structure which was advocated by Joseph Chamberlain in 1884-1885. This proposal would have offered a form of local government which it is argued would have fallen considerably short of legislative independence. The exact structure of the board was subject to negotiation, however it was proposed to the democratically elected county councils would, in turn, elect a national body with powers mainly over local government issues. Chamberlain had received some support from the Catholic bishops. His contact with Charles Stewart Parnell was through Captain O'Shea, who led Chamberlain to believe that this would be acceptable as a final settlement.

However, Chamberlain's proposal was too radical for the then Prime Minister of the United Kingdom William Gladstone who had not yet accepted the merits of Home Rule for Ireland. Lack of support led him to tender his resignation. Later, in 1886, he was an opponent of the Home Rule Bill. Rejection of his Central Board scheme may have created personal feelings of bitterness towards the Irish Parliamentary Party.
