= Fanny Parnell =

Irish poet (1848 – 1882)

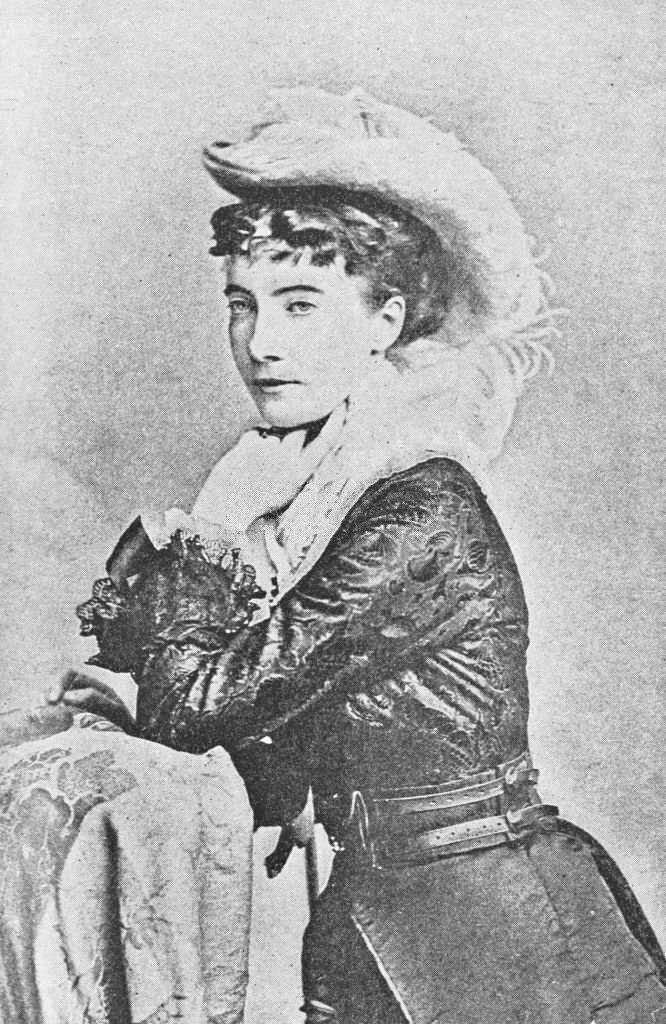
- Born: 4 September 1848; Avondale, County Wicklow, Ireland
- Died: 20 June 1882 (aged 33); Bordentown, New Jersey, United States
- Resting place: Mount Auburn Cemetery in Cambridge, Massachusetts, United States
- Occupation: Poet
- Father: John Henry Parnell
- Relatives: Charles Stewart Parnell (brother); Anna Catherine Parnell (sister); John Howard Parnell (brother)

Frances Isabelle Parnell (4 September 1848 – 20 July 1882) was an Irish poet and Irish nationalist. She was the sister of Charles Stewart Parnell and Anna Catherine Parnell, important figures in 19th-century Ireland.

== Early life ==
Parnell was born on 4 September 1848 in Avondale, County Wicklow, Ireland into a wealthy Protestant background. She was the eighth of eleven children born to John Henry Parnell, a landowner and the grandson of the last Chancellor of the Irish Exchequer, and Delia Tudor Stewart Parnell, an Irish-American and the daughter of Admiral Charles Stewart (1778–1869) of the US Navy. Parnell's mother hated British rule in Ireland, a view presented through her children's works.

As a child, Parnell studied mathematics, chemistry, and astronomy, and she could fluently speak and write in several European languages. She also had talents in music, painting, and drawing.

Parnell's parents separated when she was young, and soon after her father died in July 1859, she and her mother moved to Dalkey. A year later they moved to Dublin. In 1865, they moved to Paris to join her mother's brother. Parnell and her mother were still in Paris when the Franco-Prussian War broke out in 1870; they joined the American Ladies' Committee. They nursed the wounded, and fund-raised for and set up a hospital, including overseeing the purchasing and storing of supplies.

In 1874, Delia's brother died, and she and Parnell left Paris to return to the family estate in Bordentown, New Jersey in the United States, where Parnell's political career began.

== Works ==
Now are you men or cattle then, you tillers of the soil?

Would you be free, or evermore in rich men's service toil?

The shadow of the dial hangs dark that points the fatal hour

Now hold your own! Or, branded slaves, forever cringe and cower! –

The serpent's curse upon you lies – you writhe within the dust

You fill your mouths with beggars' swill, you grovel for a crust

Your masters set their blood-stained heels upon your shameful heads

Yet they are kind – they leave you still their ditches for your beds! –

Oh by the God who made us all, the master and the serf

Rise up and swear to hold this day your own green Irish turf!

Rise up! And plant your feet as men where now you crawl as slaves

And make your harvest fields your camps, or make of them your graves! –

But God is on the peasant's side, the God that loves the poor,

His angels stand with flaming swords on every mount and moor,

They guard the poor man's flocks and herds, they guard his ripening grain,

The robber sinks beneath their curse beside his ill-got gain.

— Fanny Parnell, Hold the Harvest

Parnell was known as the Patriot Poet. She showed interest in Irish politics and much of her poetry was about Irish nationalism. While living in Dublin in 1864, she began publishing her poetry under the pseudonym "Aleria" in The Irish People, the newspaper of the Fenian Brotherhood. Most of her later work was published in The Boston Pilot, the best-known Irish newspaper in the United States during the nineteenth century. Two of her most widely published works were The Hovels of Ireland, a pamphlet, and Land League Songs, a collection of poems. Her best known poem is "Hold the Harvest", which Michael Davitt referred to as the “Marseillaise of the Irish peasant."

=== The Hovels of Ireland ===
The Hovels of Ireland was a twenty seven page pamphlet published in February 1880. Throughout the pamphlet Parnell discusses the injustices of the Irish peasant and expresses her disgust for the Irish land-owning class, which, ironically, is the class she belongs to. In this pamphlet Parnell uses the following quote to explain that even though her family owned land she and her family were Irish nationalists. "That moral energy which inspires men with the ability and the desire to oppose themselves to injustice, to protest against the abuse of power, even when this injustice and this abuse do not directly affect them is the virtue which is the guaranty of order, security and independence". The pamphlet was widely published in newspapers and journals. The pamphlet was sold for 25 cents each, and the money earned from this was sent to the Famine Fund.

== Ladies' Land League ==
Parnell's brother, Charles, became active in the Land League, an organisation that fought for poor tenant farmers, in 1879 and she strongly supported him. Parnell and her younger sister Anna co-founded the Ladies' Land League in 1880 to raise money in America for the Land League. In 1881, the Ladies' Land League continued the work of the men in the Land League while they were imprisoned by the British government. In Ireland, Anna became the president of the Ladies' Land League, and the women held many protests and quickly became more radical than the men, to the resentment of the male leaders. Parnell stayed in the United States and worked to raise money for the organisation. Most of the Land League's financial support came from the United States because of the campaigning done by Parnell.

== Death ==
Parnell died on 20 July 1882, at the age of 33, of a heart attack at the family mansion in Bordentown, New Jersey. She was buried at the Tudor family plot at Mount Auburn Cemetery in Cambridge, Massachusetts. At the time of her death, Parnell was survived by her mother, three brothers, and four sisters.
