= Avondale Forest =

Estate in County Wicklow, Ireland

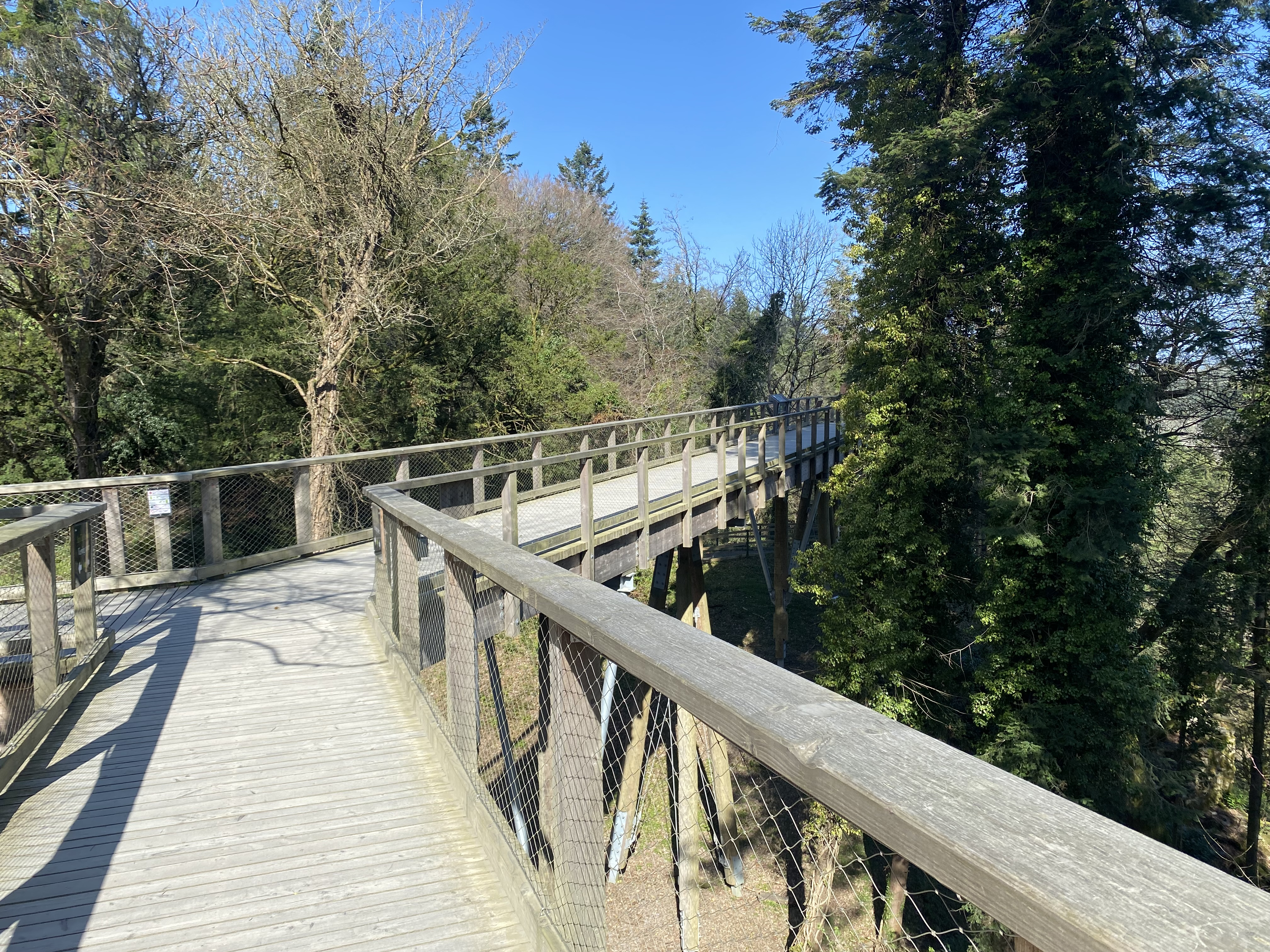
- Elevated walkway in Avondale Forest Park
- Interactive map of Avondale Forest

Geography
- Location: County Wicklow, Ireland
- Coordinates: 52°54′59.09″N 6°13′22″W
- Area: c. 500 acres

Administration
- Operator: Coillte

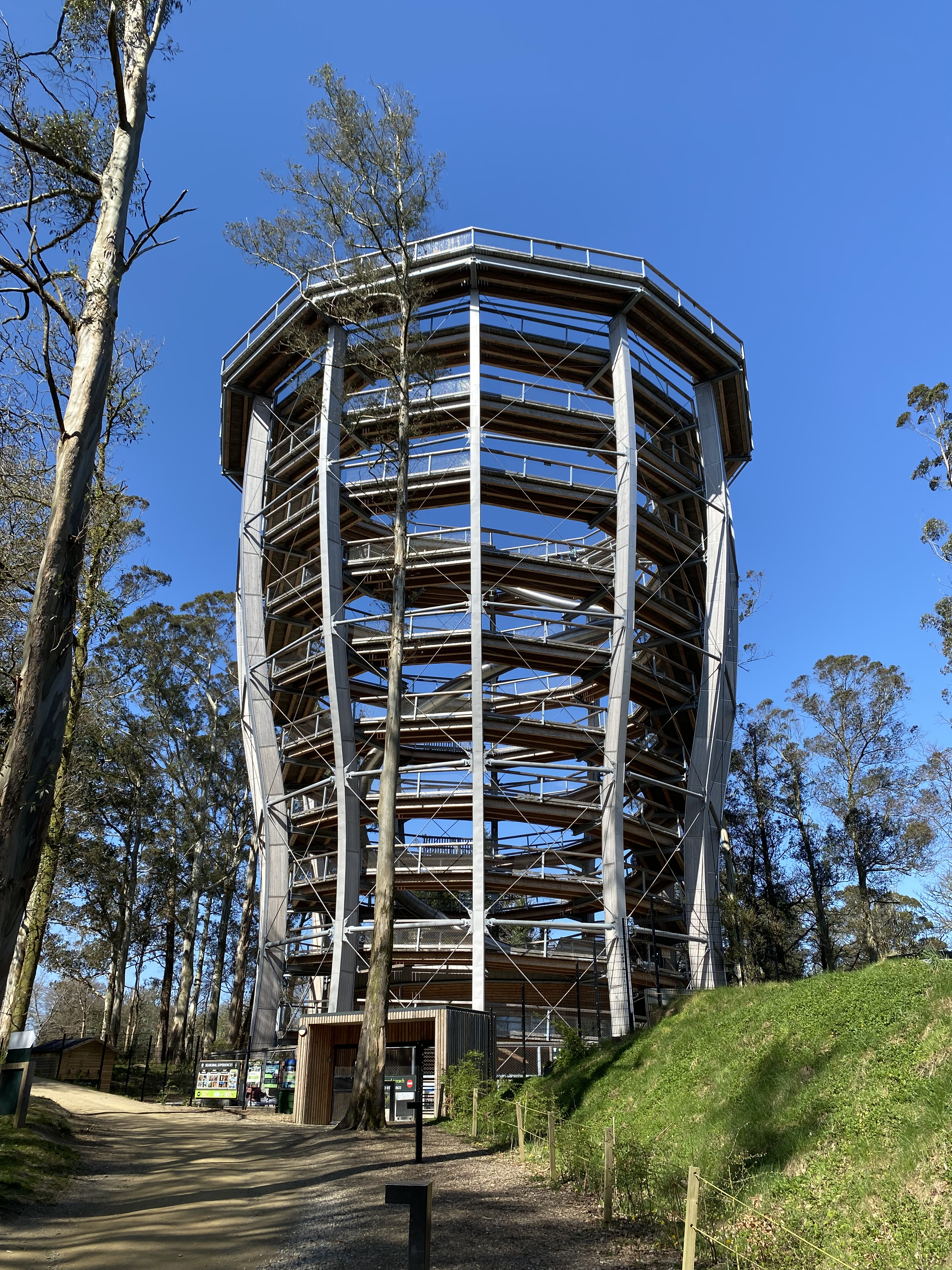
Viewing Tower of Beyond the Trees Avondale

Avondale Forest is a wooded estate in County Wicklow, Ireland, on the west bank of the River Avonmore. The forest is located on the demesne of Avondale House which was built in 1777 by Samuel Hayes who planted thousands of trees on the estate. The forest park includes an exotic tree trail, canopy walkways and an arboretum.

== Avondale House ==
Avondale Forest was planted on the lands surrounding Avondale House. This mansion, built in 1777 by Samuel Hayes, was subsequently bequeathed to Sir John Parnell, 2nd Baronet (1744–1801) and was later the birthplace of Charles Stewart Parnell (1846–1891). The Avondale estate was bought by the Irish state in 1904. The house was used as a forestry school and the grounds planted with a great variety of trees. The house was opened as the Charles Stewart Parnell Museum in 1986.

== Habitats and ecology ==
The forest at Avondale is reflective of the wider practices and history of Irish forests. Little native woodland remains, foreign species were planted for their high return and little thought was given to restoring Ireland's native woodlands. However, the park is rich in wildlife, including seven species of bat.

== Location and amenities ==
Avondale Forest Park lies mainly on the west bank of the Avonmore River and covers over 500 acres (200 ha) of land. The ruins of Parnell's old sawmill and Parnell's well are located in the park.

The forest park was subject to further development between late 2019 and 2020. In July 2022, President Michael D. Higgins officially opened "Beyond the Trees Avondale", a visitor attraction at Avondale Forest Park which includes a treetop walkway and viewing tower.

A new cafe restaurant was built along with a visitor centre on 'the great ride' (a long stretch of green space in the middle of Avondale along which horses were ridden in times past), and canopy walkways were also developed.

== Trails ==
Trails in the park include: Centenary Walk, River walk along the banks of the Avonmore River, Exotic Tree Trail, Slí na Sláinte (path to health walk), Cairn Walk, and Pine Trail. There is a weekly parkrun on Saturday mornings.
