= Charles Stewart (United States Navy officer) =

American US Navy officer (1778–1869)

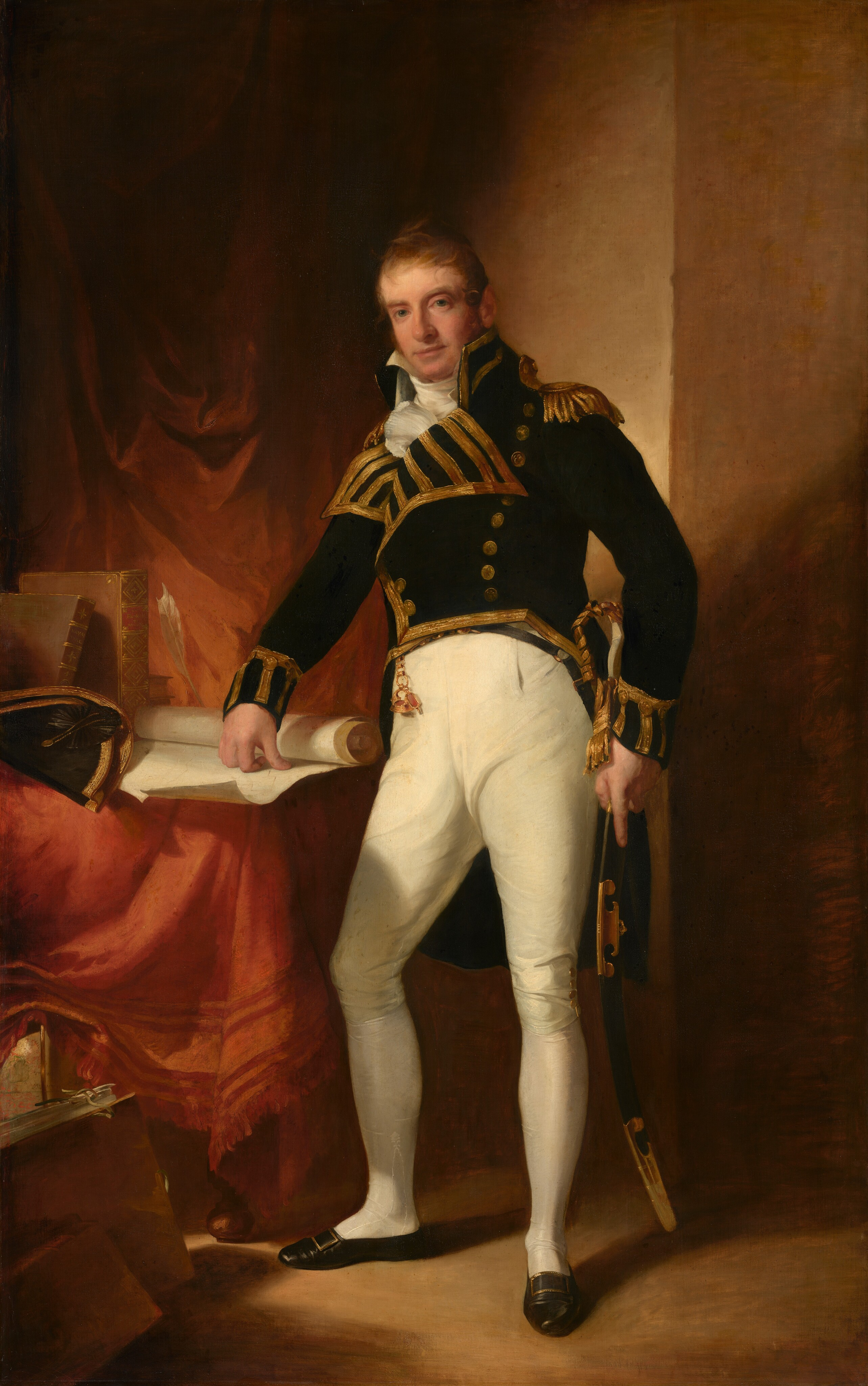
- Portrait by Thomas Sully, c. 1811–1812
- Born: 28 July 1778; Philadelphia, Pennsylvania, US
- Died: 6 November 1869 (aged 91); Bordentown, New Jersey, US
- Military career
- Allegiance: United States
- Branch: United States Navy
- Service years: 1798–1861
- Rank: Rear Admiral
- Commands: USS Experiment; USS Chesapeake; USS Syren; USS Argus; USS Hornet; USS Constellation; USS Constitution; Mediterranean Squadron; Philadelphia Navy Yard
- Conflicts: Quasi-War; Barbary Wars; War of 1812; American Civil War
- Awards: Congressional Gold Medal
- Other work: Naval Commissioner

Signature
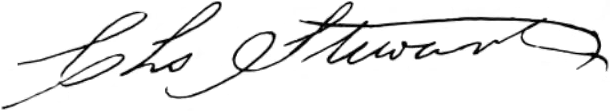

Charles Stewart (28 July 1778 – 6 November 1869) was a United States Navy officer who commanded a number of warships, including USS Constitution. He saw service during the Quasi War and both Barbary Wars in the Mediterranean along North Africa and the War of 1812. He later commanded the navy yard in Philadelphia and was promoted to become the Navy's first flag officer shortly before retiring. He was promoted to rear admiral after he retired from the Navy. He lived a long life and was the last surviving Navy captain who had served in the War of 1812.

== Early life ==
On 28 July 1778, Stewart was born in Philadelphia, Pennsylvania, to Charles and Sarah Harding (née Ford) Stewart, Scots-Irish immigrants from Belfast, only a month after British forces evacuated the city. His father died in 1780, leaving his mother little means to support him and his three siblings. She later remarried a former bodyguard of General Washington. Stewart attended Dr. Abercrombie's Episcopal Academy in Philadelphia where he met Stephen Decatur and Richard Somers. He went to sea at the age of thirteen as a cabin boy and rose through the grades to become master of a merchantman.

== Early naval service ==
During the Quasi-War with France, Stewart was one of the first officers in the rebirth of the United States Navy. At the age of nineteen, he was commissioned a lieutenant on 9 March 1798 and joined the frigate USS United States, under the command of John Barry, as fourth lieutenant for a cruise in the West Indies to restrain French privateers. Stewart was in charge of the ship's outfitting and recruiting of crew.

On 16 July 1800 he assumed command of the schooner USS Experiment and captured two armed French vessels and recapturing several American ships. While anchored at the island of Dominica for water, he secured the release of an American citizen impressed onboard a Royal Navy warship. He later rescued approximately seventy people, mostly women and children from a vessel in distress at a reef near Saona Island, just before the schooner sank, for which the Governor of Santo Domingo sent a letter of thanks to President Jefferson.

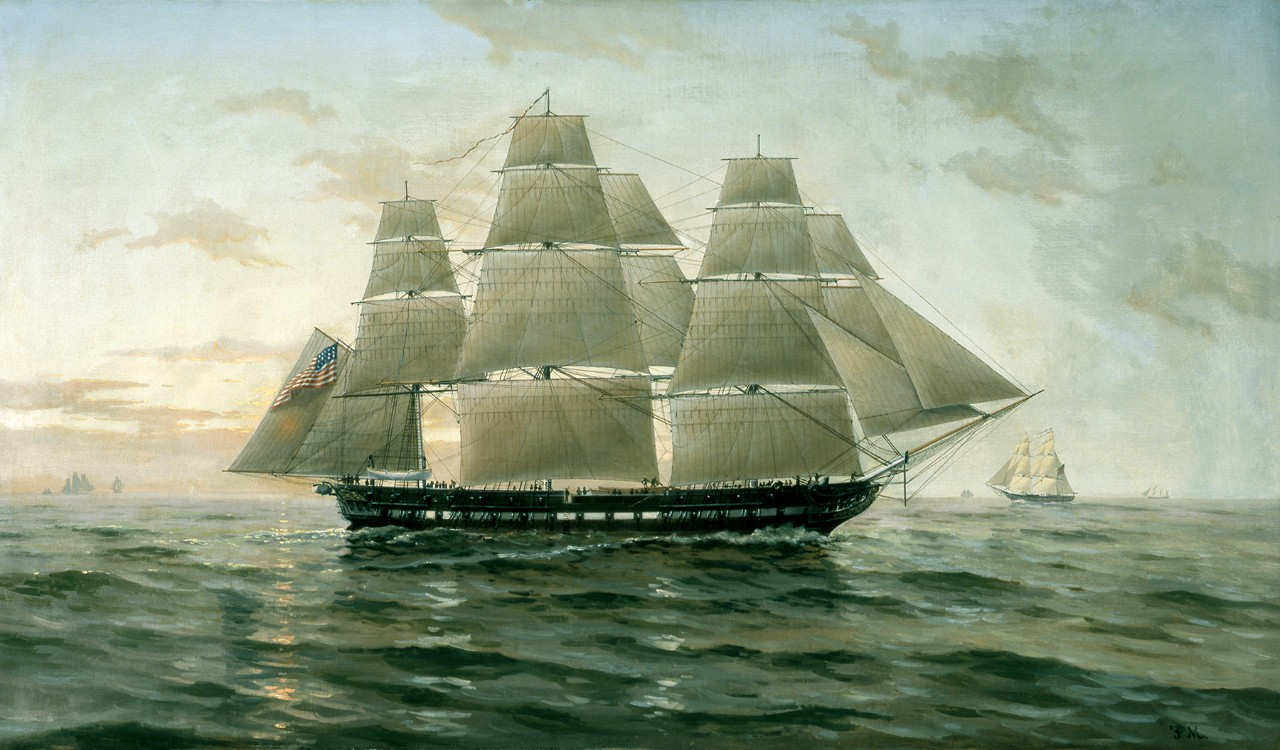
USS Chesapeake

After brief command of USS Chesapeake in 1801 and service in USS Constellation in 1802, Stewart sailed to the Mediterranean in command of the brig USS Syren. He was promoted to master-commandant on 19 May 1804. There, he participated in the destruction of USS Philadelphia after her capture by Tripoli, helped to maintain the blockade of Tripoli, and distinguished himself in assaults on the enemy in August and September 1804. After the First Barbary War, he participated in a show of force at Tunis. He was second in command to Preble from 1803 through 1805. He was promoted to the rank of captain on 22 April 1806 and returned home on leave from US Navy, joining the merchant fleet, where he remained until the late 1811.

== War of 1812 ==
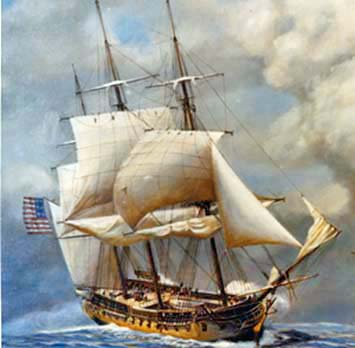
USS Constellation

During the War of 1812, Stewart commanded, successively, USS Argus, USS Hornet, and USS Constellation. Since Constellation was closely blockaded in Norfolk by the British, he took command of Constitution ("Old Ironsides") at Boston on 18 July 1813. He made two cruises in her between 1813 and 1815.

Under Stewart's command, Constitution captured the Royal Navy warships HMS Cyane and HMS Levant on 20 February 1815. The Treaty of Ghent had been ratified by the United States government three days earlier but both sides in the battle were unaware of that event. Due to his capture of two enemy warships with only one ship, Stewart became a national hero and was awarded a Congressional Gold Medal on 22 February 1816. He was also admitted as an honorary member of the Pennsylvania Society of the Cincinnati in the same year.

== Postwar career ==
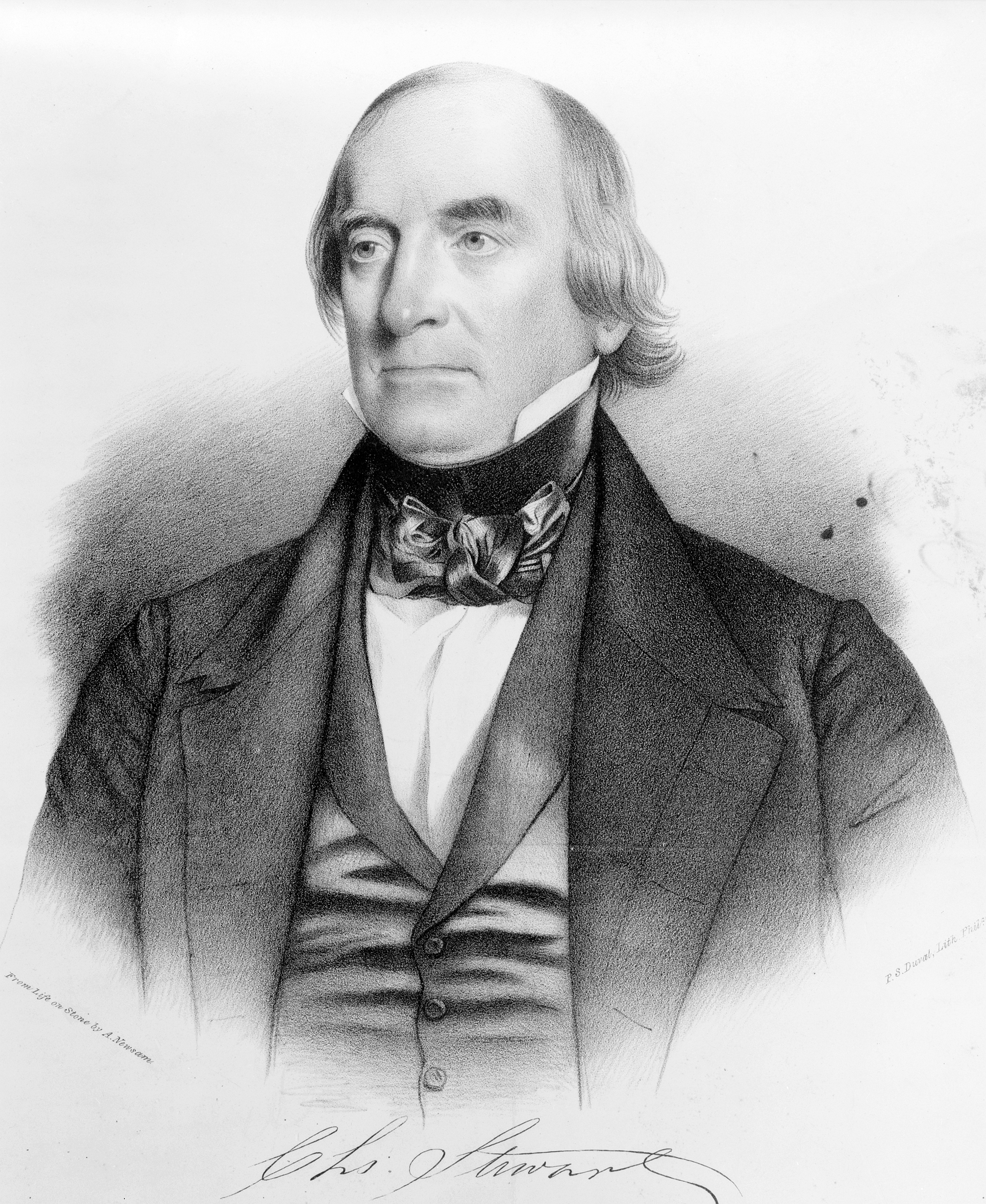
Lithograph, c. 1841

Stewart's later service included command of the American Mediterranean squadron from 1816 to 1820 and of one in the Pacific from 1820 to 1824. For South American patriots fighting for their independence, commodore Stewart's conduct in Peruvian waters was controversial because, claiming "neutral rights" for U.S. merchants, he escorted their ships through a patriot blockade to trade with Spanish royalists. His flagship, the USS Franklin, also transported a Spanish spy. (Stewart said he was unaware the Spaniard was on his ship, and he blamed his wife for secreting the man on board.) For these and other actions, the U.S. Navy subjected Stewart to a highly publicized court-martial upon return to the United States. Stewart's wife refused to testify in his defense, and they soon divorced. Stewart biographers Berube and Rodgaard concluded about his trial that, “the Navy desperately needed a not-guilty verdict as several of its senior-most captains faced courts-martial in the summer of 1825.” A board of twelve of Stewart's fellow officers found him not guilty.

Stewart served as a Naval Commissioner from 1830 to 1832.

In 1836 Stewart saw service in the West Indies and commanded a vessel that captured a Portuguese slave ship as it came into Havana. Before Stewart's boarding crew took control of the ship, the captain of the ship jumped overboard, swam ashore and escaped. On board the slave ship were 250 enslaved African children, with many other slaves onboard the vessel having already died from a lack of water during the voyage. Outraged at the conditions and health of the children, Stewart informed the British commissioner in Havana, a Mr. Kennedy, of the dire situation he had encountered.

In the later years of his career, Stewart commanded the Philadelphia Navy Yard from 1838 to 1841, in 1846, and again from 1853 to 1861.

== Senior officer ==
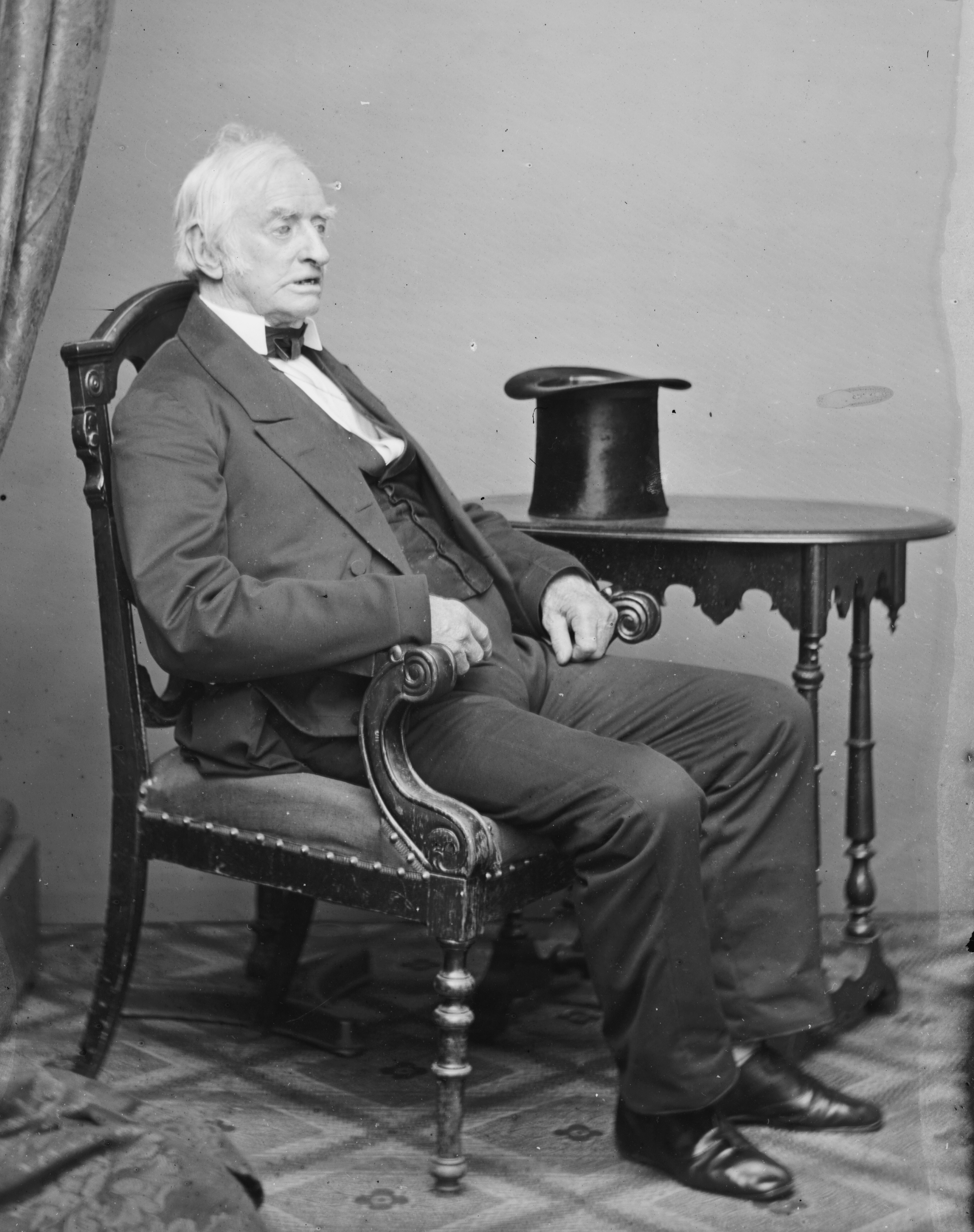
Stewart in the 1860s

Upon the death of Captain James Barron in 1851, Stewart became the most senior ranking officer in the Navy. By a joint resolution passed on 2 March 1859, Congress made Stewart "senior flag officer" on 22 April 1859, a rank created for him in recognition of his distinguished and meritorious service.

Stewart was placed on the retired list on 21 December 1861 after serving 63 years in the Navy. His age at the time of his retirement was 83 years, 4 months and 24 days – making him the second oldest officer on active duty in the history of the U.S. Navy (after William D. Leahy). He was promoted to rear admiral on the retired list on 16 July 1862. Stewart holds the all time records for the longest active duty career and longest time holding a single rank on active duty (52 years 10 months).

Shortly after his death, Stewart was elected a veteran companion of the Pennsylvania Commandery of the Military Order of the Loyal Legion of the United States – a military society of officers who had served the Union during the Civil War. He was assigned the Society's insignia number 1119, which was not issued to him. The register of the Pennsylvania Commandery states his date of election as November 6, 1869 (i.e. the actual date of his death) and, erroneously, his date of death as November 7, 1869.

Stewart died at Bordentown, New Jersey, on 6 November 1869 at the age of 91.

== Dates of rank ==
- Lieutenant, USN – 9 March 1798
- Captain, USN – 22 April 1806
- Senior Flag Officer, USN – 2 March 1859
- Retired List – 21 December 1861
- Rear Admiral, USN (Retired) – 16 July 1862

== Personal life and legacy ==
He first married Delia Tudor. His grandchildren, by their daughter Delia Tudor Stewart Parnell (1816–1898) and John Henry Parnell, included Charles Stewart Parnell, a prominent Irish political leader who fought for Irish home rule until his death in 1891, and Anna Parnell and Fanny Parnell, Irish nationalists who co-founded the Ladies' Land League in 1880 to raise money in America for the Land League.

Secondly he married Margaretta W. Smith. Their daughter Julia Smith Stewart (1834–1910) married Harry Laguerenne, the son of Eliza Beauveau and Pierre Louis Laguerenne. He was a wine and spirits importer in Philadelphia.

Several of Stewart's nephews served in the Navy, including Commodore Charles Stewart McCauley.

In the late 19th century, his estate became the site of the Bordentown School, a residential high school academic and vocational training program.

Two U.S. Navy destroyers, DD-13 and DD-224, and one destroyer escort, DE-238, have been named in Stewart's honor.

== See also ==
- Bibliography of early American naval history

== Bibliography ==
- Allison, Robert J. (2005). Stephen Decatur American Naval Hero, 1779–1820.
  University of Massachusetts Press. ISBN 1-55849-492-8. Url
- Berube, Claude G.; Rodgaard, John A. (2005). A Call To The Sea: Captain Charles Stewart Of The USS Constitution. Potomac Books, Inc. p. 301. ISBN 1574885189.Url
- Ignatius, Martin; Griffin, Joseph (1897). The history of Commodore John Barry.
  Published by the Author, Philadelphia. p. 261. Url
- Tucker, Spencer (2004). Stephen Decatur: a life most bold and daring.
  Naval Institute Press, 2004 Annapolis, MD. p. 245. ISBN 1-55750-999-9. Url
- Whipple, Addison Beecher Colvin (2001). To the Shores of Tripoli: the birth of the U.S. Navy and Marines.
  Naval Institute Press, 2001. p. 296. ISBN 1-55750-966-2. – Url
- Philadelphia Yearly Meeting of the Religious Society of Friends, ed. (1851). An exposition of the African slave trade: from the year 1840, to 1850, inclusive, Volume 2. J. Rakestraw. p. 160. Url
