= Ladies' Land League =

Body campaigning for land reform in Ireland, 19th century

The Ladies' Land League (founded 31 January 1881; dissolved 10 August 1882) was an auxiliary of the Irish National Land League and took over the functions of that organization when its leadership was imprisoned. It is the first political association of Irish women.

== Background ==
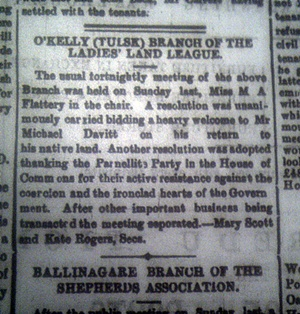

The Irish National Land League was founded by Michael Davitt in 1879. Its aims were a) “to bring about a reduction of rack rents” and b) “to facilitate the obtaining of the ownership of the soil by the occupiers”. Charles Stewart Parnell, the dominant political figure of the day, was chosen as president. By late 1880 Davitt felt sure that the leadership of the League would soon be imprisoned. He suggested that a Ladies' Land League be set up to carry on the work after their imprisonment. A few months previously a Ladies' Land League Committee had been set up in New York by Fanny Parnell, Charles' sister, to raise funds for the Irish National Land League. Parnell was strongly opposed but Davitt and the Treasurer, Patrick Egan, persuaded the Central Committee. Davitt suggested Anna Parnell, another sister, to head it and on 31 January 1881 at 39, Sackville Street, Dublin the Ladies' Land League was formally established.

== Work of the Ladies' Land League ==
The organisation grew rapidly. By May 1881, there were 321 branches in Ireland, with branches also in Britain, the US, Canada, Australia, and New Zealand.

At the Central Office a detailed register, referred to by the women as the "Book of Kells" was kept of information sent in weekly by the local branches. This detailed every estate, the name of the landlord or agent, number of tenants, rent paid, valuation, number of evictions that had taken place and the number pending . When notice of a pending eviction was received, members travelled to the area bringing money for assistance. If the tenants wanted to bring a law case, the league instructed a solicitor and paid his costs. They also erected wooden huts, if they could, for the evicted tenants, though the police often stopped this. In October the Land League leaders were jailed and the League banned. From jail, they issued a "No Rent " manifesto. From this point on, the women were responsible for continuing the work.

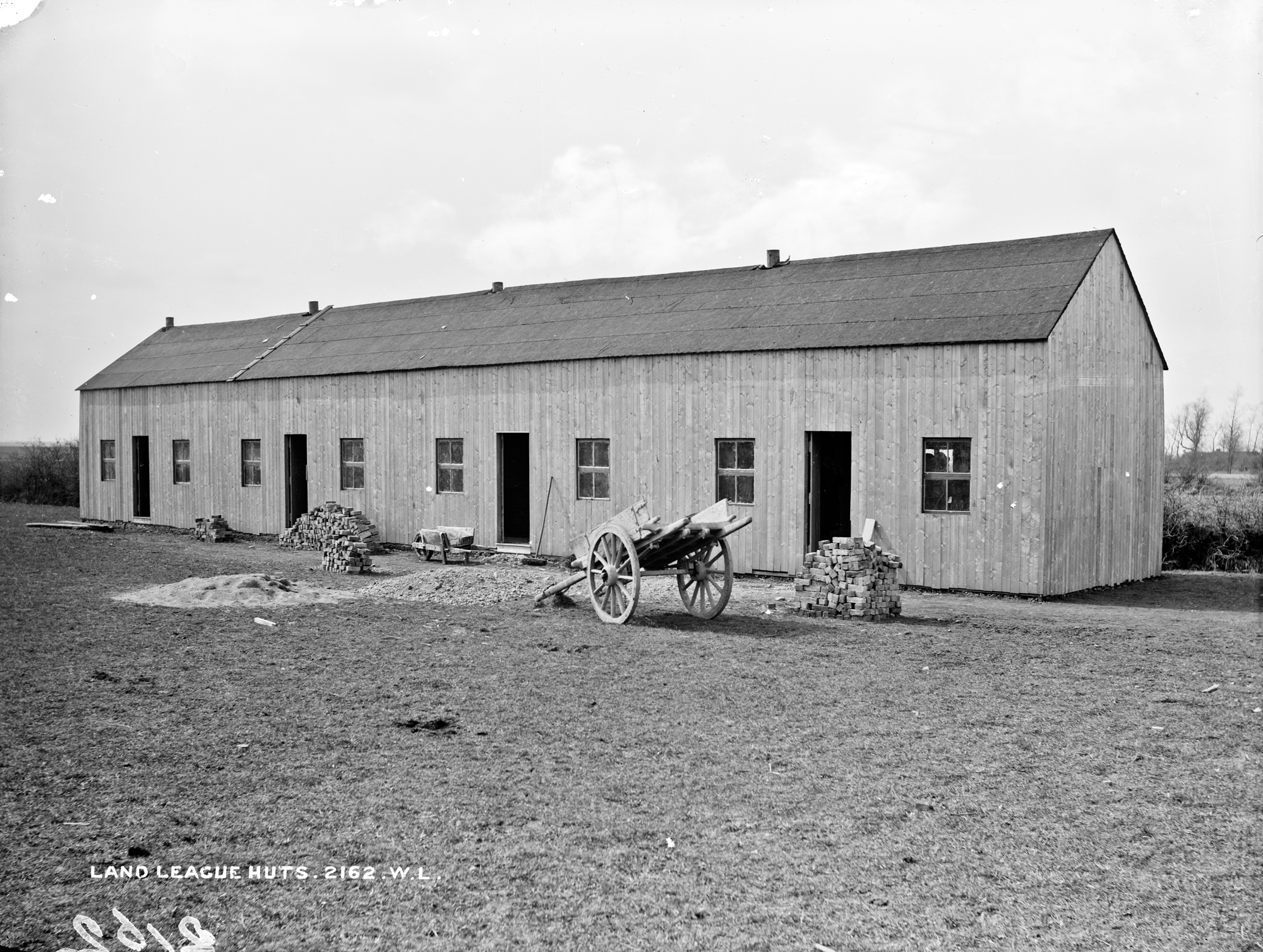

At first, volunteer labour was used to build the huts erected for evicted tenants, but this proved very unsatisfactory. Eventually, Anna Parnell settled on prefabricated wooden huts about 20 feet long with windows and wooden floors. The wood was cut, prepared and shipped from Dublin by the firm of B.B. Leech of d'Olier Street who sent along carpenters to oversee the work. A galvanized tin roof, felt cladding and a stove were sent separately. These huts could be erected quickly and could also be quickly dismantled and moved to another site. This frequently happened as tenants after a few months paid arrears and moved back to their holdings. Over 200 such huts were built.

As well as providing grants to evicted tenants, the League also provided grants to the families of those jailed under the Coercion Act. They also saw to the welfare of the Land League prisoners in Kilmainham Gaol. They provided them with comforts of various kinds and organized a food supply for them so they would not have to depend on prison food. Caterers were used at first, but at 25s 6d per week per head this was a drain on funds. Eventually, Anna Parnell persuaded the League leaders to change to 15s a week allowance to each prisoner to provide for himself.

The ladies found themselves with additional work late in 1881. The Land League had started its own paper United Ireland in August 1881, but towards the end of the year the government tried to close it down. William O'Brien, the editor, continued to smuggle out copy from Kilmainham, but it fell to the ladies to get it printed. This was done first in London and then for a while in Paris. Eventually, the ladies printed and circulated it themselves from an office at 32 Lower Abbey Street.

The final accounts of the Ladies' Land League, presented to Michael Davitt in June 1882, show that they expended just short of £70,000 during their 18 months of existence.

== Catholic church response ==
On Saturday 12 March 1881, just more than a month after the formation of the league, a pastoral letter of Archbishop Edward McCabe of Dublin was read out in all the churches of the diocese. It condemned the league in the strongest terms, deploring that "our Catholic daughters, be they matrons or virgins, are called forth, under the flimsy pretext of charity, to take their stand in the noisy street of life." McCabe was not representative of all bishops, particularly Archbishop Thomas Croke of Cashel, a strong supporter of the original league. Croke published a letter in the Freeman's Journal challenging the "monstrous imputations" in McCabe's pastoral. It was quite a church scandal for one bishop to attack the pastoral of another. McCabe complained to the Vatican, backing his complaints with a thick file of Irish newspaper clippings about events around the country. Bishop Moran was charged with sorting out the quarrel and managed to elicit a grudging apology to McCabe from Croke for being "technically" wrong in his actions.

The dissension was revived somewhat in the summer of 1882. An "Address by the Catholic Bishops of Ireland to their Flocks on the State of the Country" was to be issued on 10 June. McCabe (now Cardinal) and another bishop tried to have a public condemnation of the Ladies' Land League inserted into the Address. The other bishops resisted on the basis that it would probably do more harm than good. They contented themselves with expressing their hope that "the women of Ireland will continue to be the glory of their sex and the noble angels of stainless modesty". When newspapers interpreted this as a condemnation of the league, Croke wrote again to the Freeman's Journal to deny that this had been the intention of the bishops. Again complaints about him were made to the Vatican, and again he had to account for himself to church authorities.

== Government response ==
The order banning the League made no direct reference to the Ladies' Land League, but many police officers tried to insist that the ban included the women's group. Eventually, on 16 December 1881, Inspector General Hillier of the R.I.C. ordered the police to stop the women's meetings. Anna Parnell defiantly issued a notice to all Ladies' Land League branches in the country, widely publicised in the press, calling on them all to hold a meeting at 1.30 p.m. on 1 January 1882.

The prominent resident magistrate, Major Clifford Lloyd, was of the view that the Coercion Act could only usefully be used against combinations, and he persuaded the Chief Secretary, Forster, to initiate a scheme to infuse new vigour into the administration of the ordinary law. The country was divided into five districts, each presided over by a Special Resident Magistrate, with executive authority over the entire forces of the crown within his area. Lloyd himself was appointed Special Resident Magistrate for the Limerick district.

Lloyd claimed that the huts built for evicted tenants were being used as posts from which the evicted tenants could intimidate anyone who attempted to take over their vacated holdings. In April 1882, he threatened that anyone attempting to erect huts would be imprisoned. That month, Anne Kirke was sent down from Dublin to Tulla, County Clare, to oversee the erection of huts for a large number of evicted tenants. Lloyd had her arrested and imprisoned for three months.

The government did not wish to be seen to use the Coercion Act to imprison women, but another stratagem was used. In December 1881 21-year-old Hannah Reynolds was imprisoned under an ancient statute from the reign of Edward III, the original purpose of which was to keep prostitutes off the streets. The statute empowered magistrates to imprison "persons not of good fame" if they did not post bail as a guarantee of their good behavior. Since she claimed her behavior was good, Reynolds refused to pay bail and spent a month in Cork gaol. In all, thirteen women served jail sentences under this statute.

== Dissolution ==
On 3 May 1882 Parnell and other leaders were released from jail after agreeing the Kilmainham Treaty.This included some improvement in the 1881 Land Act. He now wished to turn his attention more to the Home Rule question. The Irish National Land League was replaced by the Irish National League. Parnell also wanted to see an end to the Ladies' Land League. There had been increased violence when he was in jail and he saw Anna as too radical. The organization had an overdraft of £5,000 which Parnell agreed to clear from central funds only if the organization was dissolved. At a meeting of the Central Committee on 10 August 1882 the Ladies' Land League voted to dissolve itself. Anna herself was not in attendance at that meeting, having suffered a physical and mental collapse after the sudden death of Fanny the previous month at the age of 33.

The records of the Ladies' Land League were lost to history in 1916. Jennie Wyse Power, who had served on the Central Committee, had kept them in her house in Henry Street. When fire spread from Sackville Street during the 1916 Rising, her house was destroyed and the records perished in the blaze.
