= Land War =

Civil unrest and protests in support of land reform in late 19th-century Ireland

- Part of Irish Home Rule movement
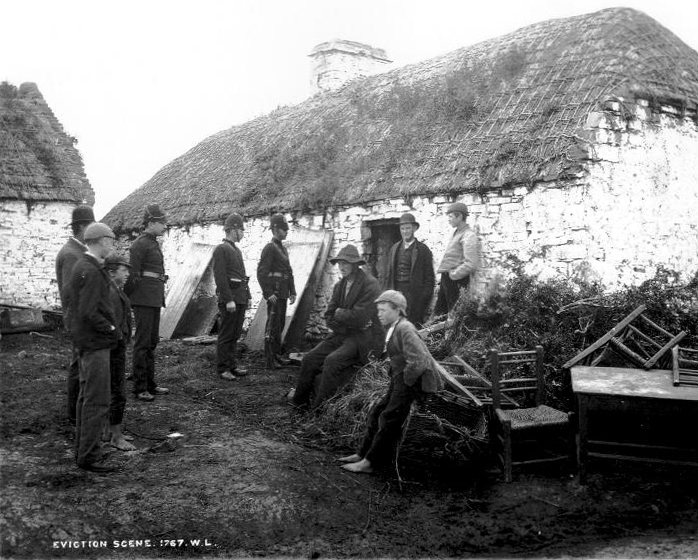
- An Irish family in Moyasta, County Clare being evicted c. 1879
- Date: Main phase: 20 April 1879 – 6 May 1882; Plan of Campaign: 1886–1891; Ranch War: 1906–1911; Further agitation: until 1923
- Caused by: Concentration of land ownership; Absentee landlords; 1879 famine
- Goals: Free sale, fixity of tenure, and fair rent; Land reform; Redistribution of land to tenant farmers
- Methods: Rent strikes, boycotts, political demonstrations
- Result: Kilmainham Treaty; Land Conference; Redistribution of land to tenant farmers; Increase in Irish nationalism

Parties
Irish tenant farmers; Irish National Land League; Irish National League; United Irish League	Landlords

Lead figures
Charles Stewart Parnell; Michael Davitt; William O'Brien; Laurence Ginnell	Lord Salisbury; Lord Clanricarde; Charles Boycott

The Land War (Irish: Cogadh na Talún) was a period of agrarian agitation in rural Ireland (then wholly part of the United Kingdom) that began in 1879. It may refer specifically to the first and most intense period of agitation between 1879 and 1882, or include later outbreaks of agitation that periodically reignited until 1923, especially the 1886–1891 Plan of Campaign and the 1906–1909 Ranch War. The agitation was led by the Irish National Land League and its successors, the Irish National League and the United Irish League, and aimed to secure fair rent, free sale, and fixity of tenure for tenant farmers and ultimately peasant proprietorship of the land they worked.

From 1870, various governments introduced a series of Land Acts that granted many of the activists' demands. William O'Brien played a leading role in the 1902 Land Conference to pave the way for the most advanced social legislation in Ireland since the Union, the Land Purchase (Ireland) Act 1903. This Act set the conditions for the break-up of large estates by government-sponsored purchase.

Alongside the political and legal changes, the "Long Depression" affected rent yields and landlord-tenant relations across all of Europe from the 1870s to the 1890s.

== Background ==
During the second half of the nineteenth century, Ireland suffered population loss due to emigration and the Great Famine.

The population of Ireland was overwhelmingly rural; in 1841, four-fifths of the population lived in hamlets smaller than 20 houses. This ratio declined over the century, but only due to emigration from rural areas and not from growth of the towns and cities. Land in Ireland was concentrated into relatively few hands, many of them absentee landlords. In 1870, 50% of the island was owned by 750 families. Between 1850 and 1870, landlords extracted £340 million in rent—far exceeding tax receipts for the same period—of which only 4–5% was reinvested. This led landlords to take on a role of non-productive managers within the island's overall economy. Conflict between landlords and tenants arose from opposing viewpoints on such issues as land consolidation, security of tenure, transition from tillage to grazing, and the role of the market. The Irish nationalist politician Isaac Butt opined that Catholic Irish being tenants was worse than "the heaviest yoke of feudal servitude".

The Devon Commission of 1843–44 found that various forms of tenant right were practiced throughout Ireland, not just in Ulster. There was a tension between English law, which protected the absolute property rights of the landlord, and Irish custom on the other hand in which the tenant enjoyed an "interest" in the property, which he could buy or sell. This "interest" could be as much as 4–6 years rent, which incoming tenants had to pay with capital that they might otherwise have spent on their own improvements. In the decades following the Great Famine, rises in agricultural prices were not matched by rent increases, leading to an increase in the tenant's stake in the farm, which may have risen to as much as 10–20 years of rent. The existence of tenant right was accepted by creditors who would extend loans with the tenant right as collateral.

During the Great Famine (1845–1849), the poorest cottiers and agricultural labourers died or were forced to emigrate, freeing up land that was purchased by larger farmers. In 1850, the Tenant Right League briefly dominated Irish politics with the demand for free sale, fixity of tenure, and fair rent. Although it never caught on with the poor smallholders in Connacht which it was intended to help, the League spurred the creation of the Independent Irish Party. In 1870, the Liberal Prime Minister William Ewart Gladstone pushed through the Landlord and Tenant (Ireland) Act 1870. The act actually increased agrarian tensions, as landlords attempted to evade provisions intended to protect departing tenants, while the tenants retaliated by setting up local Tenants' Defence Associations. One such the Route Tenants' Defence Association, was however hostile towards the League.

Agrarian crimes were rising during the late 1870s, from 135 in 1875 to 236 two years later. At the same time emigration (which acted as a pressure valve for political tension) decreased by more than half. Nevertheless, as late as 1877 the areas which would be heavily affected by Land League agitation were completely calm, without any hint of what was to come. In 1878, the Irish-American Clan na Gael leader John Devoy offered Charles Stewart Parnell, then a rising star in the Irish Parliamentary Party (IPP), a deal which became known as the New Departure. As a result of this agreement, the physical-force and parliamentary wings of Irish nationalism agreed to work together on the land issue. This collaboration was cemented by a meeting on 1 June 1879 in Dublin between Devoy, Parnell, and Michael Davitt. It is disputed what was actually agreed to. Davitt maintained that there was no formal agreement, while Devoy claimed that the IPP had promised not to act against the Irish Republican Brotherhood (IRB) and made other concessions in exchange for Irish-American support.

The west of Ireland was hit by the 1879 famine, a combination of heavy rains, poor yields and low prices that brought widespread hunger and deprivation. Compounded by the reduction in opportunities for outside income, especially seasonal agricultural income in Great Britain, many smallholders were faced with hunger and unable to pay their rent. Some landlords offered rent abatement, while others refused on the grounds that their tenants were participating in anti-landlord agitation. Irish historian Paul Bew notes that five of the largest landlords in Connacht also refused to contribute any money to relief funds, despite collecting more than £80,000 annually in rent. According to historians such as William Vaughan and Phillip Bull, the serious agricultural recession combined with a unified nationalist leadership set the stage to produce a powerful and lasting popular movement.

== Chronology ==
=== Land League (1879–1881) ===
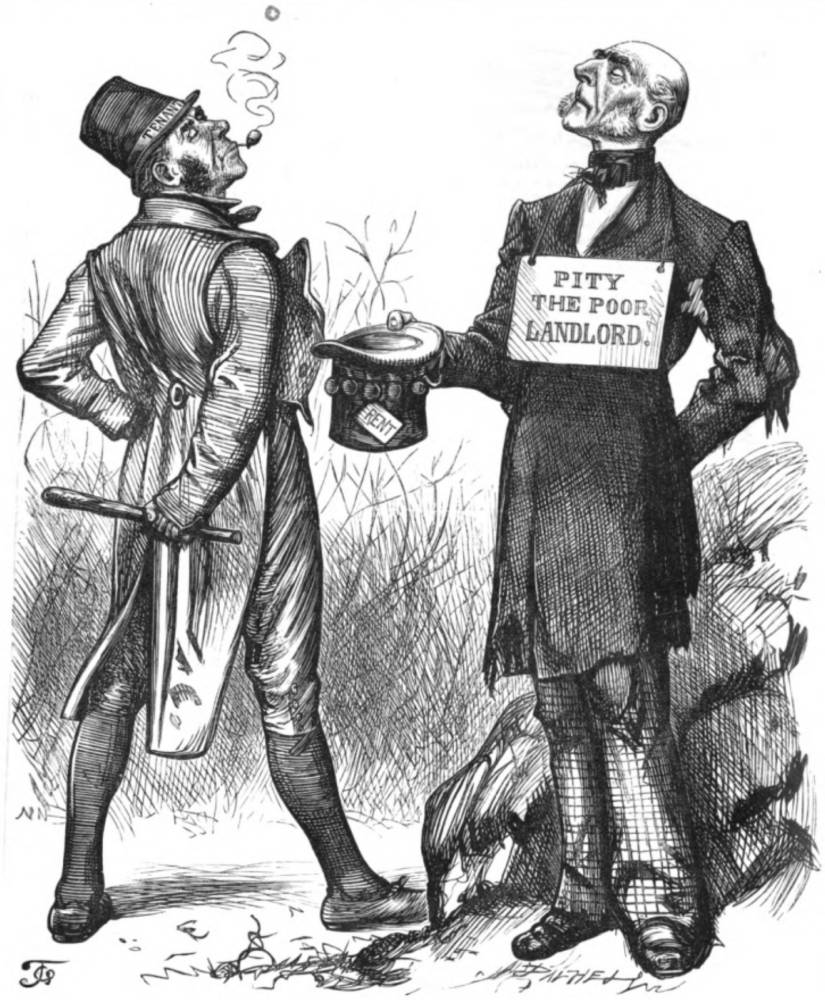
Irish landlord reduced to begging for rent, 1880 caricature

The Land War began on 20 April 1879 at a mass meeting in Irishtown, County Mayo organised by local and Dublin-based activists, led by Davitt and James Daly. The activists tried to mobilize an alliance of tenant farmers, shopkeepers and clergy in favour of land reform. Although the clergy refused to participate, some 7,000 to 13,000 people attended the meeting, having come from all parts of Mayo and counties Roscommon and Galway. The main issue was rent, which was typically paid in the spring; due to the poor harvest tenants could not afford to pay and many had been threatened with eviction. The crowd was guided and led into position by local Fenians—recruited by Davitt in an earlier trip with help from local IRB leader Pat Nally—even though the IRB council refused to sanction agrarian activism. Speakers included John O'Connor Power MP, Fenian Thomas Brennan, Glasgow-based activist John Ferguson, and Daly.

Local Fenians organised meetings, at Claremorris on 25 May with 200 attendees and Knock on 1 June with a reported 20,000–30,000 turnout, in protest of the Church's position. Another meeting was held in Westport, County Mayo on 8 June, in protest against the Marquess of Sligo, the largest landowner in Mayo; Davitt persuaded Parnell to speak and 8,000 people turned out. Parnell went on with the engagement even after John MacHale, Archbishop of Tuam, denounced the meeting in a 7 June letter to The Freeman's Journal. Parnell also wanted to prevent the new movement's capture by Fenian radicals, as the latter were unacceptable to the Catholic clergy and to larger tenants, on whose support Parnell depended. This meeting, especially Parnell's speech in which he promoted peasant proprietorship, was widely commented in the press as far afield as London.

Initially, the movement was non-sectarian in character and Protestant tenants also took part in meetings. The focus of the leadership shifted from agitation to organization to harness the new energy for the nationalist cause. On 16 August 1879, the Land League of Mayo was founded in Castlebar, at which point the first overtures were made to the Catholic hierarchy. From September, priests quickly assumed leadership roles in the movement and presided over more than two thirds of the meetings in the rest of 1879. The movement continued to gain strength as the economic situation deteriorated. Involvement of the clergy made it much more difficult for the British government to take action against the movement, which instilled "almost perfect unity" among Irish tenant farmers. In several constituencies, Land League-backed candidates failed in the 1880 general election due to clerical opposition.

On 21 October 1879, the land League of Mayo was superseded by the Irish National Land League based in Dublin, with Parnell made its president. As the land agitation progressed, it was taken over by larger farmers and the centre of gravity shifted away from the distressed western districts. In Mayo, the autumn potato harvest was only 1.4 tons per acre, less than half of the previous year. At the Land League conference in April 1880, Parnell's program of conciliation with landlords was rejected in favour a demand for the abolition of "landlordism", promoted by Davitt and other radicals. On 17 May, Parnell was elected to the presidency of the IPP. Local chapters of the Land League frequently were formed from previous associations such as Tenants' Defence Associations or Farmers' Clubs, which decided to join the Land League because of the greater financial resources offered; this brought larger farmers and graziers into the movement.

The league adopted the slogan "the land for the people", which was vague enough to be acceptable to Irish nationalists across the political spectrum. For most of the tenant farmers, the slogan meant owning their own land. For smallholders on uneconomic holdings, especially in the congested western areas, it meant being granted larger holdings that their families had held previous to the Great Famine evictions. For radicals such as Michael Davitt, it meant land nationalization. The fusion between land agitation and nationalist politics was based on the idea that the land of Ireland rightfully belonged to the Irish people but had been stolen by English invaders who had foisted a foreign system of land tenure upon it. Nominally, the Land League condemned large-scale grazing as improper use of land that rightfully belonged to tillage farmers. As investment in grazing land was the main vehicle of upward mobility for rural Catholics, the new Catholic grazier class was torn between its natural allegiance to Irish nationalism and its economic dependence on landlords to rent land for grazing. Many sided with the Land League, creating a mixed-class body whose actual economic interests conflicted. This further consolidated the nationalist nature of the Land League.

The government set up the Land Commission in 1881 with quasi-judicial powers that eventually enabled most tenant farmers to buy freehold interests in their land.

=== Suppression (1881–1882) ===
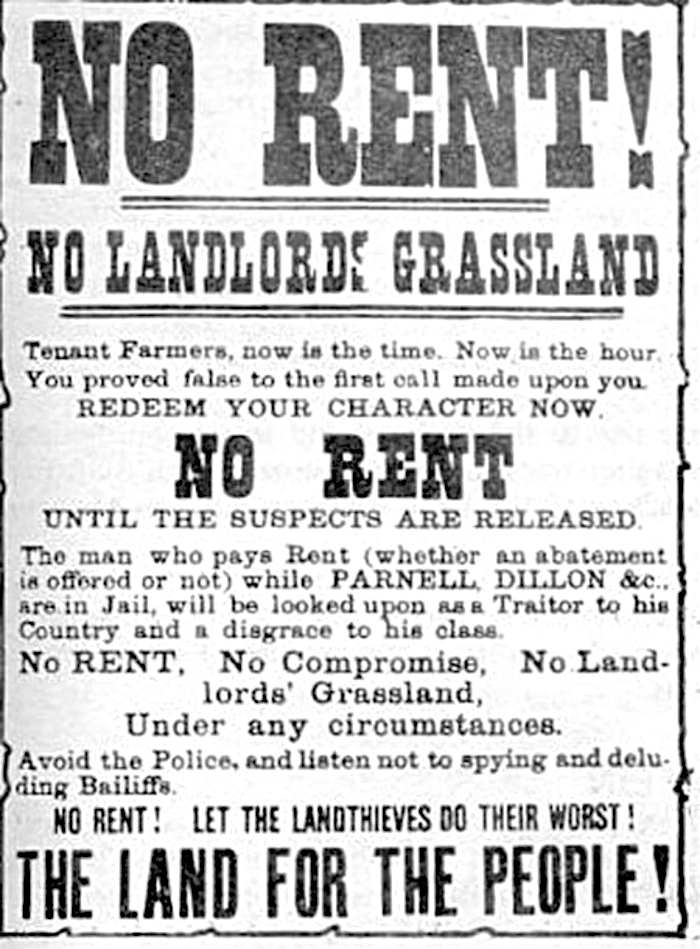
Land League poster from the No Rent Manifesto period

After the general election of April 1880 with the Land War still raging, Parnell believed then that supporting land agitation was a means to achieving his objective of self-government. Prime Minister Gladstone attempted to resolve the land question with the Land Law (Ireland) Act 1881. The act gave greater rights to tenant farmers, so-called dual ownership, but failed to eliminate tenant evictions. Parnell and his party lieutenants, William O'Brien, John Dillon and Willie Redmond went into a bitter verbal offensive against the act and were imprisoned in October 1881 in Kilmainham Jail, together with other prominent members of the League, under the Protection of Persons and Property (Ireland) Act 1881 (also known as the Coercion Act). While in jail, they issued the No Rent Manifesto, calling for a national tenant farmer rent strike until their release. Finally, on 20 October the government moved to suppress the Land League.

A genuine No Rent campaign was virtually impossible to organise, and many tenants were more interested in "putting the Land Act to the test". It further seemed that the Coercion Act, instead of banishing agrarian crime, had only intensified it. Although the League discouraged violence, agrarian crimes increased widely. For the ten months before the Land Act was passed (March–December 1880), the number of "outrages" were 2,379, but in the corresponding period of 1881 with the act in full operation the numbers were 3,821. The figures to March 1882, with Parnell in jail, showed a continued increase.

In April 1882 Parnell moved to make a deal with the government. The settlement, known as the Kilmainham Treaty, involved withdrawing the manifesto and undertaking to move against agrarian crime. By 2 May all internees were released from jail, Davitt on 6 May, the day of the Phoenix Park Murders. With the Land League still suppressed, Parnell resurrected it with much ceremony together with Davitt on 17 October, proclaimed as a new organisation called the Irish National League.

=== Plan of Campaign (1886–1891) ===
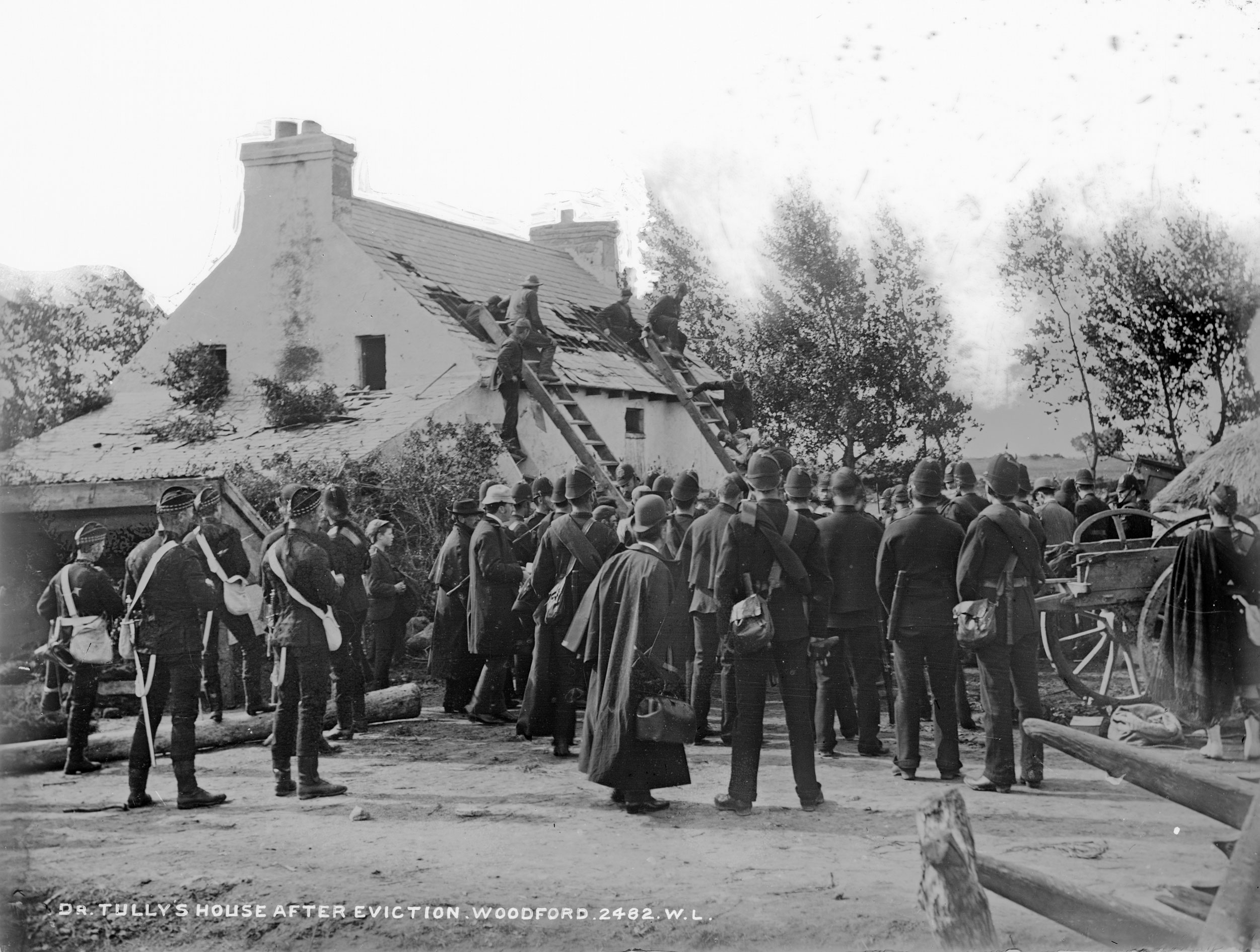
Eviction in Woodford, County Galway, in 1888, during the Plan of Campaign

Preceded by economic difficulties due to droughts in 1884 and 1887 as well as industrial depression in England causing shrinking markets, the 1886–1891 Plan of Campaign was a more focused version of agitation and rent strikes. Tenants on an estate would meet and decide on what was a fair rent to pay their landlord, even though rents had already been judicially fixed by the 1885 act. They would offer to pay the lower rent, and if it was refused, would instead pay it to the Plan of Campaign fund. These rent strikes targeted the most heavily indebted and financially insecure landlords, who faced a choice between immediate bankruptcy and accepting a lower income. Lord Clanricarde had evicted many tenants and became the main target. Given the extended franchise allowed in 1884, the IPP had to gain credibility with the larger number of new voters, choosing the most numerous Irish group: the low-to-middle-income rural electorate. Most IPP members were Catholic, and appealed to Rome for moral support. So did the government, and the Vatican issued a Papal Rescript followed by an encyclical "Saepe Nos" in 1888, condemning the activities of the Land League, particularly boycotting. Saepe Nos also claimed to extend and clarify an earlier similar ruling by the Sacred Congregation for Propaganda.

In 1887 the Criminal Law and Procedure (Ireland) Act 1887 was passed to deal with the offenses surrounding the Campaign.

After the 1881 and 1885 Land Reform Acts (see below), many Tory press commentators described the Plan of Campaign as an opportunistic and cynical method of revenge following the division of the Liberal Party and the rejection of the first Irish Home Rule Bill in June 1886. It was also described as cruel, as new rent strikes would inevitably result in more evictions and boycotting as before, with all the associated intimidation and violence. Other reporters saw it as a matter of justice and of continuing concern to genuine liberals.

The Campaign led on to events such as the Mitchelstown massacre in 1887 and the imprisonment of IPP MPs such as William O'Brien for their involvement. The violent aspects of the campaign were abandoned on the run-up to the debates on the Second Irish Home Rule Bill in 1893. The IPP was by then divided into the Irish National Federation and the Irish National League over Parnell's divorce crisis.

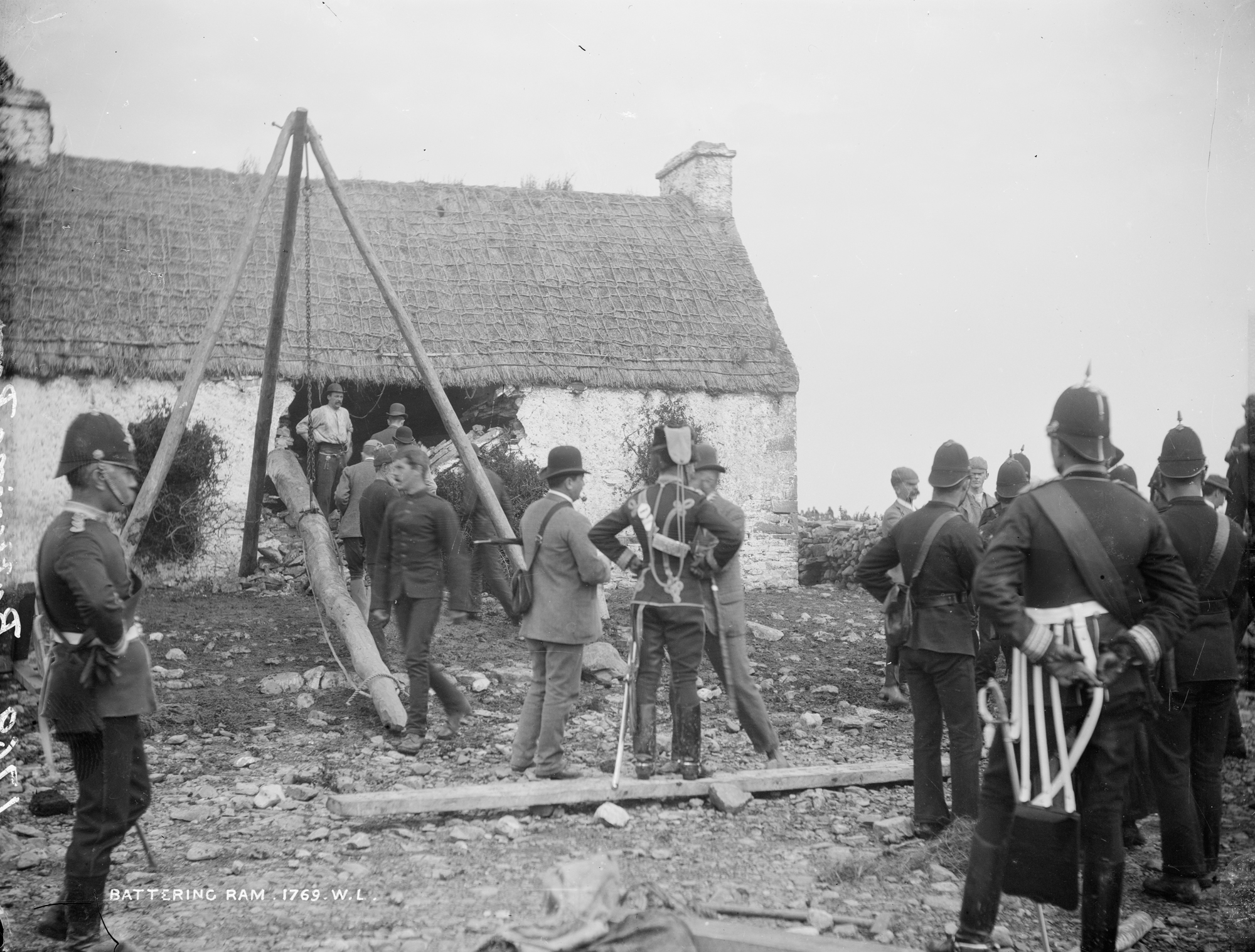
Royal Irish Constabulary evict a man from his house in Moyasta on the Vandeleur Estate in County Clare, July 1888 during the Plan of Campaign.

=== Later agitation ===
Between 1906 and 1909, smallholders seeking more land launched the Ranch War, demanding the sale of untenanted land owned by landlords and the breakup of large grazing farms. Opponents of ranching highlighted the fact that many ranches had been created after the famine from land formerly tilled by evicted smallholders. Organised by the United Irish League and Laurence Ginnell, the Ranch War involved cattle drives, public rallies, boycotting, and intimidation. Between August and December 1907 alone, 292 cattle drives were reported to the authorities. It was most intense in areas of Connacht, North and East Leinster and North Munster where large grazing farms and uneconomic smallholdings existed side by side. The campaign resulted in a defeat for the small farmers; besides "a legacy of bitterness and cynicism in Connaught", the main effect of their campaign was to show how Irish nationalism had become a bourgeois movement, including many large graziers.

By the Irish War of Independence (1918–1922) about half a million people were occupying uneconomic smallholdings, mostly in the west of Ireland. In addition, veterans of the Irish Volunteers and first Irish Republican Army had been promised land in exchange for their service. In 1919–1920, a wave of land seizures took place in western Ireland, and in 1920 agrarian crimes were recorded at their highest level since 1882. When their hopes for acquiring more land were dashed by the fact that the Anglo-Irish Treaty made no mention of the land issue, many joined the Anti-Treaty side in the following Irish Civil War. In the Irish Free State, their grievances fueled the Fianna Fáil party and led to the Land Acts of 1923 and 1933, which caused the "dramatic redistribution" of large farms and estates to smallholders and the landless.

== Tactics ==
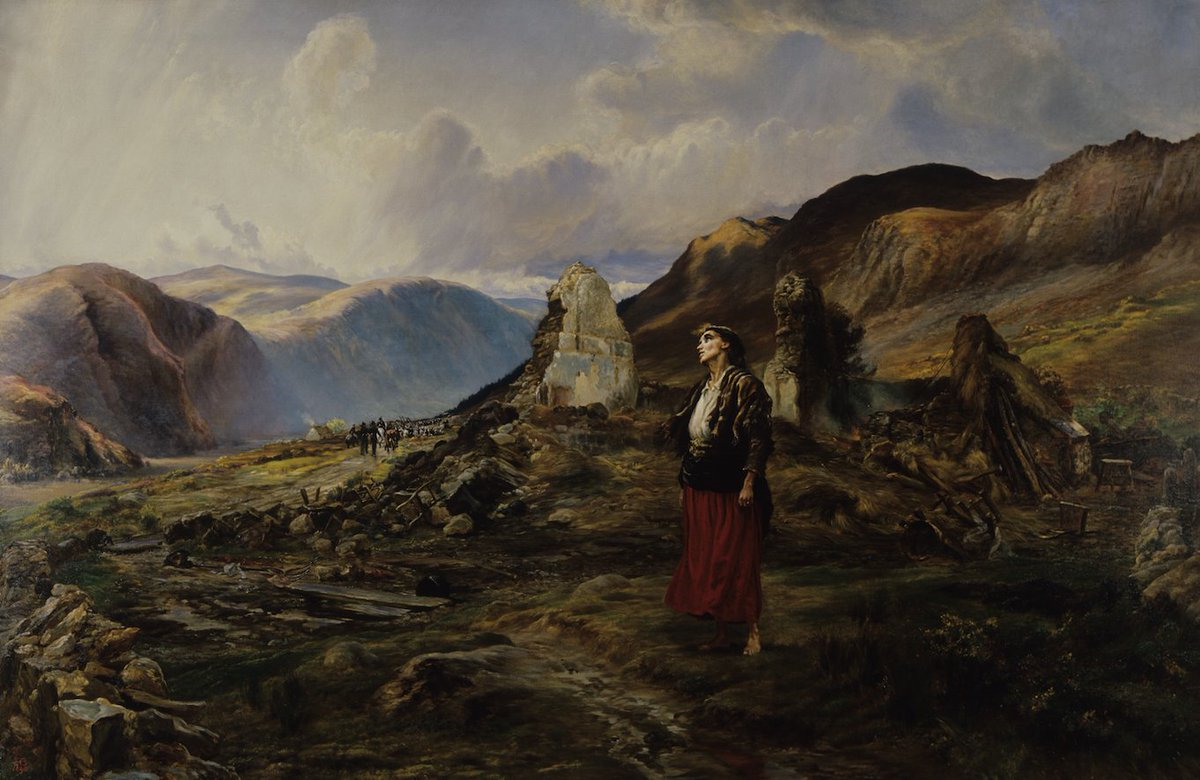
Evicted (1890) by Lady Butler depicts a woman standing by her destroyed cottage shortly after an eviction near Glendalough, County Wicklow

=== Land courts ===
Some of the Land League's local branches established arbitration courts in 1880 and 1881, which were explicitly modelled on British courts. Typically, the cases were heard by the executive committee, which would summon both parties, call witnesses, examine evidence presented by the parties, make the judgment and assign a penalty if the code had been broken. Sometimes, juries would be called from the local communities and the plaintiff occasionally acted as prosecutor. Despite the trappings of common-law procedure, American historian Donald Jordan emphasizes that the tribunals essentially were an extension of the local branch judging if its own rules had been violated. These courts were described as a "shadow legal system" by British academic Frank Ledwidge. According to historian Charles Townshend, the formation of courts was the "most unacceptable of all acts of defiance" committed by the Land League. In 1881, Chief Secretary for Ireland William Edward Forster grumbled that Land League law was ascendant:

... all law rests on the power to punish its infraction. There being no such power in Ireland at the present time, I am forced to acknowledge that to a great extent, the ordinary law of the country is powerless; but the unwritten law is powerful, because punishment is sure to follow its infraction.

From 1882, the Irish National League organised courts to replace those of the earlier organisation. The key provisions forbade paying rent without abatements, taking over land from which a tenant had been evicted, and purchasing their holding under the 1885 Ashbourne Act. Other forbidden actions included "participating in evictions, fraternizing with, or entering into, commerce with anyone who did; or working for, hiring, letting land from, or socializing with, boycotted person". Tribunals were typically led by the leaders of local chapters, holding open proceedings with a common law procedure. This was intended to uphold the League's image of being in favour of the rule of law, just Irish law instead of English law.

=== Boycott ===
When a man takes a farm from which another has been evicted, you must shun him on the roadside when you meet him, you must shun him in the streets of the town, you must shun him at the shop-counter, you must shun him in the fair and at the marketplace, and even in the house of worship... you must shun him your detestation of the crime he has committed... if the population of a county in Ireland carry out this doctrine, that there will be no man ... [who would dare] to transgress your unwritten code of laws.

— Charles Stewart Parnell, at Ennis meeting, 19 September 1880

One of the Land League's main tactics was the famous boycott, whose target at first was "land grabbers". Land League speakers including Michael Davitt began to advocate a new non-violent moral tactic against those taking over the land of evicted tenants. Parnell gave a speech in Ennis in 1889, proposing that when dealing with such tenants, rather than resorting to violence, everyone in the locality should instead shun them. This tactic was then widened to landowners. The term "boycott" was coined later that year following the successful campaign against County Mayo land agent Charles Boycott. The concerted action taken against him meant that Boycott was unable to hire anyone to harvest the crops in his charge. Boycott was forced to leave the country; and the tactic spread throughout the country. The use of "intimidation" to enforce a boycott had to be criminalized in the Prevention of Crime (Ireland) Act 1882.

According to the Inspector General, boycotting "constituted a form of imprisonment for the victim who was isolated and separated from the rest of the community." Larger farmers and landlords were better able to cope with a boycott, by weathering temporary loss of income, hiring scabs, or ordering supplies by mail. While the effectiveness of boycotting has been disputed the phrase and tactic has passed into the language of non-violent action.

=== Rent strike ===
Rent strikes were used as a means of pressuring landlords to reduce the rent. Withheld rents often went to a "defence fund" for legal representation in eviction cases and support for evicted families. Rent strikes could also be effected in a Slowdown way, with paying a fraction now and promising more next week while making oneself unavailable, it could include obstacles for rent collectors, re-occupation of farms rented by evicted defaulters, etc. The Meaghers of Kilbury are credited as the inventors of this kind of tactics when they practiced it in January 1880.

=== Violence ===
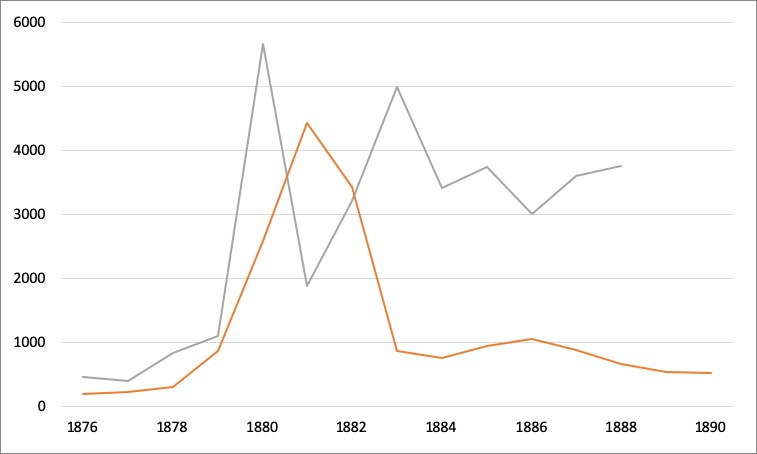
Evictions (grey) and agrarian crime (orange) during the Land War

Contemporary opponents argued that the Land War amounted to an "organised campaign of terrorism". In his biography of Michael Davitt, T. W. Moody acknowledged that the crime resulted from the Land League's militancy, but argued that statistics disprove the idea that the Land League maintained a "reign of terror". The most common type of agrarian offence was the sending of threatening letters. Davitt and other Land League leaders denounced agrarian crime in strong language, and local chapters of the National League passed many resolutions against it. However, the organisations were not in control of their rank-and-file. Between 1879 and in 1881, crimes related to the Land War rose from 25% to 58% of all crime in Ireland, without the leaders calling for an end to the agitation. Only 16 percent of agrarian crimes led to arrests, much less than the 50% rate for non-agrarian offences. Gladstone believed that escalating crimes were proof of the failure both of his government's policy of coercion and the Land League's No Rent strategy.

Agrarian outrages decreased significantly after the founding of the Irish National League in 1882, due to the latter's system of dispute resolution for agrarian issues which imposed boycotting as its most severe punishment. British officials often claimed that the National League's effectiveness was due to the fear of violence from lawless elements if the litigant did not comply. Sociologist Samuel Clark argued that the threat of violence helped the Land League enforce its rulings and silence its enemies. In 1889, the Special Commission on Parnellism and Crime found no links between the IPP and agrarian crime. One British official explained that, while he was certain that the League did not plan or commit crimes, "without outrage and intimidation the League could not possibly exist".

== Land Acts ==
The land question in Ireland was ultimately defused by a series of Irish Land Acts, beginning in 1870 with rent reform, establishing the Land Commission in 1881, and providing for judicial reviews to certify fair rents. The Purchase of Land (Ireland) Act 1885 started a limited process of allowing tenant farmers to buy their freeholds, which was greatly extended following the 1902 Land Conference, by the Land Purchase (Ireland) Act 1903. Augustine Birrel's Land Purchase (Ireland) Act 1909 allowed for compulsory purchase, and also allowed the purchase and division of untenanted land that was being directly farmed by the owners. These acts allowed tenants first to attain extensive property rights on their leaseholdings and then to purchase their land off their landlords via UK government loans and the Land Commission. The 1903 act gave Irish tenant farmers a government-sponsored right to buy, which is still not available in Great Britain today.

The success of the Land Acts in reducing the concentration of land ownership is indicated by the fact that in 1870, only 3% of Irish farmers owned their own land while 97% were tenants. By 1929, this ratio had been reversed with 97.4% of farmers holding their farms in freehold. However, the Land Acts were not the only factor causing this redistribution; the Great War and conflict during the Irish revolutionary period also facilitated the selling of land. Land agitators came to see the reforms they sought as a panacea for rural Ireland's ills. In fact, emigration and economic disadvantage continued apace, while the greatest beneficiaries of land reform were the middle class of medium farmers.
