= Gaelic law =

Gaelic law may refer to:

- Early Irish law
- Alternative law in Ireland prior to 1921
- Manx law
- Law of the Brets and Scots
