= Irish Famine (1879) =

Last major famine in Ireland

Irish Famine (1879) an Gorta Beag
- Country: United Kingdom of Great Britain and Ireland
- Location: Ireland, mainly Connacht
- Period: 1879
- Causes: The Long Depression, inclement climate, potato blight, cholera among chickens
- Relief: Home Rule League, Land League and clergy successfully campaigned for British Crown relief. Aid raised in the United States, including over 3000 barrels of food sent aboard USS Constellation.
- Consequences: Increased emigration and urbanisation (often temporary). Religious revival, including Marian apparition in Knock. Helped incite the Land War of the late 1870s and early 1880s.
- Preceded by: Great Famine (1845–1852) (an Gorta Mór)

The Irish famine of 1879 was the last main famine in Ireland. Unlike the earlier Great Famines of 1740–1741 and 1845–1852, the 1879 famine (sometimes called the "mini-famine" or an Gorta Beag) caused hunger rather than mass deaths and was largely focused in the west of Ireland.

The famine is in part attributed to the economic effects of the Long Depression (1873–1879/1899). The most severely affected area was the province of Connacht. By the end of 1879, newspapers were reporting severe distress amongst tenants in all parts of Ireland traditionally dependent on the potato, with only 1.4 tons produced per statute acre (3.5 tons per hectare) in County Mayo, the lowest in a decade and under half the previous year's harvest. Despite the relatively small scale of this famine, its appearance caused widespread panic among the Irish people. Many of the adults of the period had experienced the Great Famine of 1845–1852 as children and were terrified that their families faced a repeat of the widespread deaths, and in particular a repeat of "Black '47". An increase in emigration occurred, as did a move from foodless parts of rural Ireland into major cities and towns. However, the population moves proved temporary. With the re-appearance of the harvest in 1880, many of those who had fled to urban centres repopulated the areas they had left.

The famine caused relatively few deaths due to the efforts at famine relief. The politicians Charles Stewart Parnell of the Home Rule League and Michael Davitt of the Irish National Land League, along with some Irish clergy, notably Bishop Logue of Raphoe, were actively involved in campaigning to put pressure on the British government and in the distribution of aid. Since the famine of the 1840s a railway system had been built, allowing food to be transported to the west of Ireland in days instead of weeks. In addition, aid arrived from the United States. The Department of the Navy dispatched USS Constellation in March 1880, with over 3,300 barrels of food aboard, along with clothing. Similarly, $200,000 was collected by the New York Herald by late February 1880.

== Effects ==
The famine of 1879 is attributed to the effects of the "Long Depression" in the late 19th century, inclement climate, potato blight, and cholera among chickens. Unlike the earlier Irish Famine of 1740 to 1741 and Great Famine of 1845 to 1852, the 1879 event resulted in fewer deaths, due to changes in the technology of food production, different structures of land-holding (the disappearance of the sub-division of land and of the cottier class as a result of the earlier Great Famine), remittances from the Irish diaspora, and in particular the prompt response of the British government, which contrasted with its laissez-faire response in 1845–1852. Another factor was the growth of small shops; one estimate has County Mayo shopkeepers extending some £200,000 in credit by August 1879, which had been steadily accumulated since the relatively bad harvest of 1877.

Radical Irish Member of Parliament Charles Stewart Parnell of the Home Rule League (later its leader), Michael Davitt of the Irish National Land League and some Irish clergy, notably Bishop Logue of Raphoe, were actively involved in campaigning to put pressure on the British government and in the distribution of aid. Since the famine of the 1840s a railway system had been built, allowing food to be transported to the west of Ireland in days instead of weeks.

Aid also arrived from the United States (which now had a considerable Irish American population because of the previous famine), with public support further aroused by journalists such as James Redpath at the New-York Tribune, who contributed vivid, moving reports of the misery in Ireland. The Department of the Navy dispatched USS Constellation in March 1880, with over 3,300 barrels of food aboard, along with clothing. Similarly, $200,000 was collected by the New York Herald by late February 1880.

Unlike earlier famines, what is sometimes called the "mini-famine" of 1879 was not marked by many deaths, mainly increased hunger, and was largely focused in the west of Ireland, in the province of Connacht. By the end of 1879, newspapers were reporting severe distress amongst tenants in all parts of Ireland traditionally dependent on the potato, with only 1.4 tons produced per statute acre (3.5 tons per hectare) in County Mayo, the lowest in a decade and under half the previous year's harvest.

Although it was of a far smaller scale to either of the two Great Famines, its appearance caused widespread panic among Irish people; many of the adults of the period had experienced the Great Famine of 1845–1852 as children and were terrified that their families faced a repeat of the widespread deaths, and in particular a repeat of "Black '47". An increase in emigration occurred, as did a move from foodless parts of rural Ireland into major cities and towns. However, the population moves proved temporary. With the re-appearance of the harvest in 1880, many of those who had fled to urban centres repopulated the areas they had left.

Historians have noted the appearance of a religious revival during the famine months, most famously a Marian apparition at a church in Knock, County Mayo. Knock developed as Ireland's internationally known Marian shrine in subsequent decades as a result of the apparition.

Because of the short period it covered, and the low number of deaths compared to the earlier great famines, the 1879 famine is rarely remembered in Irish history, except as a footnote to the battle for the Three Fs (fair rent, fixity of tenure, free sale) being waged by Davitt and the Land League, and as a factor in the Land War of the late 1870s and early 1880s.
