= Carla King =

Irish lecturer and author

Carla King is a lecturer at St Patrick's College, Dublin and an author in Irish history. According to Diarmaid Ferriter, she is "peerless in her expertise on Michael Davitt".

== Works ==
- King, Carla, ed. (2000). Famine, Land, and Culture in Ireland. Dublin: University College Dublin Press. ISBN 9781900621472.
- Davitt, Michael (2001). King, Carla (ed.). Collected Writings, 1868–1906. Bristol: Thoemmes/Edition Synapse. ISBN 9781855066489.
- Devoy, John (2008). King, Carla; McCormack, W. J. (eds.). Michael Davitt from the Gaelic American. ISBN 9781910820995.
- King, Carla (2009). Michael Davitt. Dublin: University College Dublin Press. ISBN 9781910820964.
- King, Carla; McNamara, Conor, eds. (2011). The West of Ireland: New Perspectives on the Nineteenth Century. History Press Ireland. ISBN 9781845887056.
- King, Carla (2016). Michael Davitt After the Land League, 1882-1906. Dublin: University College Dublin Press. ISBN 9781906359928.
