= William Edward Vaughan =

Irish historian and emeritus fellow of Trinity College Dublin

- Occupation: Historian

William Edward Vaughan is an Irish historian and emeritus fellow of Trinity College Dublin who studies the Land War and related topics.

== Works ==
- Vaughan, William Edward (1984). Landlords and Tenants in Ireland, 1848-1904. Dublin: Economic and Social History Society of Ireland. ISBN 9780947897017.
- Vaughan, William Edward (1994). Landlords and Tenants in Mid-Victorian Ireland. Clarendon Press. ISBN 9780198203568.
- Vaughan, W. E., ed. (1996). A New History of Ireland: Ireland Under the Union, 1870-1921. Oxford University Press. ISBN 9780199583744.
- Vaughan, William Edward (2009). Murder Trials in Ireland, 1836-1914. Dublin: Four Courts Press. ISBN 9781846821585.
- Vaughan, W. E., ed. (2013). The Old Library, Trinity College Dublin, 1712-2012. Dublin: Four Courts Press. ISBN 9781846823770.
