= John Ferguson (Scottish activist) =

Irish-born Scottish politician (1836–1906)

John Ferguson (1836–1906) was an Ulster-born, Glasgow-based radical activist for Irish nationalism, Irish people in Scotland and the Scottish Labour Party. He worked closely with Michael Davitt.
