= Concentration of land ownership =

Ownership of land in a particular area by a small number of people or organizations

Concentration of land ownership refers to the ownership of land in a particular area by a small number of people or organizations. It is sometimes defined as additional concentration beyond that which produces optimally efficient land use. Ownership of land and its distribution among the population is a key driver of a wide range of social, political and economic inequalities.

== Distribution ==
Land concentration exists in many countries. In Brazil, one of the countries with the highest amount of land concentration, the situation has resulted in large tracts lying idle while 95% of farmers work just 11% of the arable land. In 2010, the Czech Republic had the highest concentration, according to World Bank figures. In Scotland, just 400 people own more than 50% of privately owned land. Other countries with high land concentration include the United States, Venezuela, Paraguay, South Africa, and Namibia. Land concentration is currently increasing in the European Union and the United States, but decreasing in North Africa.

== Development ==
According to classical economic theory, a free market should allocate land in the most productive way, but in practice landowning groups have disproportionate power in many countries. Landlords seek to control land so they can extract rent, in the form of payments from tenant farmers, or more recently agricultural subsidies and other subsidies from the state. State policies which favor large landowners, such as differential taxation that hits free peasants harder than large landlords and serfs, are an important cause of land concentration. One way that land is accumulated is through unitary inheritance, in contrast to life estates or partible inheritance which tend to redistribute land over time. Conquest can lead to land concentration if the conquerors confiscate land from the original owners. High interest rates or lack of access to credit can block poorer farmers from buying land, while debt can force them to sell to larger landholders. Historically, when land owning becomes less profitable, landowners sell and rural peasants have an opportunity to acquire land. Along with land reform, inheritance taxes and capital gains taxes have also led to the breakup of some estates. Land reform in some countries, including Ireland, South Korea, Japan, and Mexico, have significantly reduced land concentration.

== Effects ==
Critics argue that concentrated land ownership gives the landowner too much power over local communities, reduces opportunities, and impedes economic growth. One study of nineteenth-century Prussia found an inverse correlation between large estates and educational enrollment. In Central America, an economic boom in coffee production led to vastly different results in different cfountries: Costa Rica and Colombia were dominated by smallholdings and experienced democratization and surging literacy rates, while in El Salvador and Guatemala, rural laborers earned bare subsistence. Studies in 48 developing countries found a correlation between land concentration and deforestation. Another study found an inverse correlation between inequality of land ownership and economic growth. According to a Scottish landlord group, however, land use is more important than land ownership, and there is not enough evidence for a negative effect.

Scholars have linked land inequality with unstable democracies and dictatorships, whereas greater land equality tends to be linked to stable democratic forms of government.

According to some economists, concentrated land ownership in non-Western countries explains the Great Divergence in outcomes between wealthy, Western countries and the rest of the world. Israeli economist Oded Galor writes the mediating factor for this effect was that large landholdings gave the landowning elites political power to stop reforms aimed at improving education rates and therefore human capital, which in turn facilitated the divergence. According to Gary Libecap, differences in land ownership patterns explain much of the different development trajectories between the United States and Latin America. He attributes the greater success and entrepreneurial spirit of the United States to its Homestead Acts giving land to prospective smallholders.

Although there has been some debate as to the optimal size of landholdings for agricultural productivity, research has indicated that unlike industry, which benefits from economy of scale, the most productive farms are small- to medium- sized family farms cultivated with a minimum of hired labor. This may be because family labor is cheaper and more productive than hired labor, or because crops benefit from close attention. (The phenomenon of small farms being more efficient is known as the inverse relationship). On the other hand, land fragmentation is known to reduce productivity of land.

== Land reform ==
Land reform (also known as agrarian reform) refers to the process of changing who owns agricultural land and who has the right to use these lands. Redistributive land reform refers to the narrower concept of transferring agricultural land ownership from large private landowners to small farmers and people without any landholdings. It involves the redistribution of wealth and political power that comes from owning large swathes of land. There are different types of land reform, including state-led and market-led agrarian reforms.

== See also ==
- Absentee landlord – Person who rents a property, but does not live in the property's local economic region
- Equal-field system – Ancient Chinese system of land ownership
- Latifundia – Estate in antique and modern Rome
- Land tenure – Legal regime in which area owned by an individual is held by another person
- Land value tax – Levy on the unimproved value of land
