= Charles Townshend (historian) =

British historian (born 1945)

Professor Emeritus Charles Townshend FBA
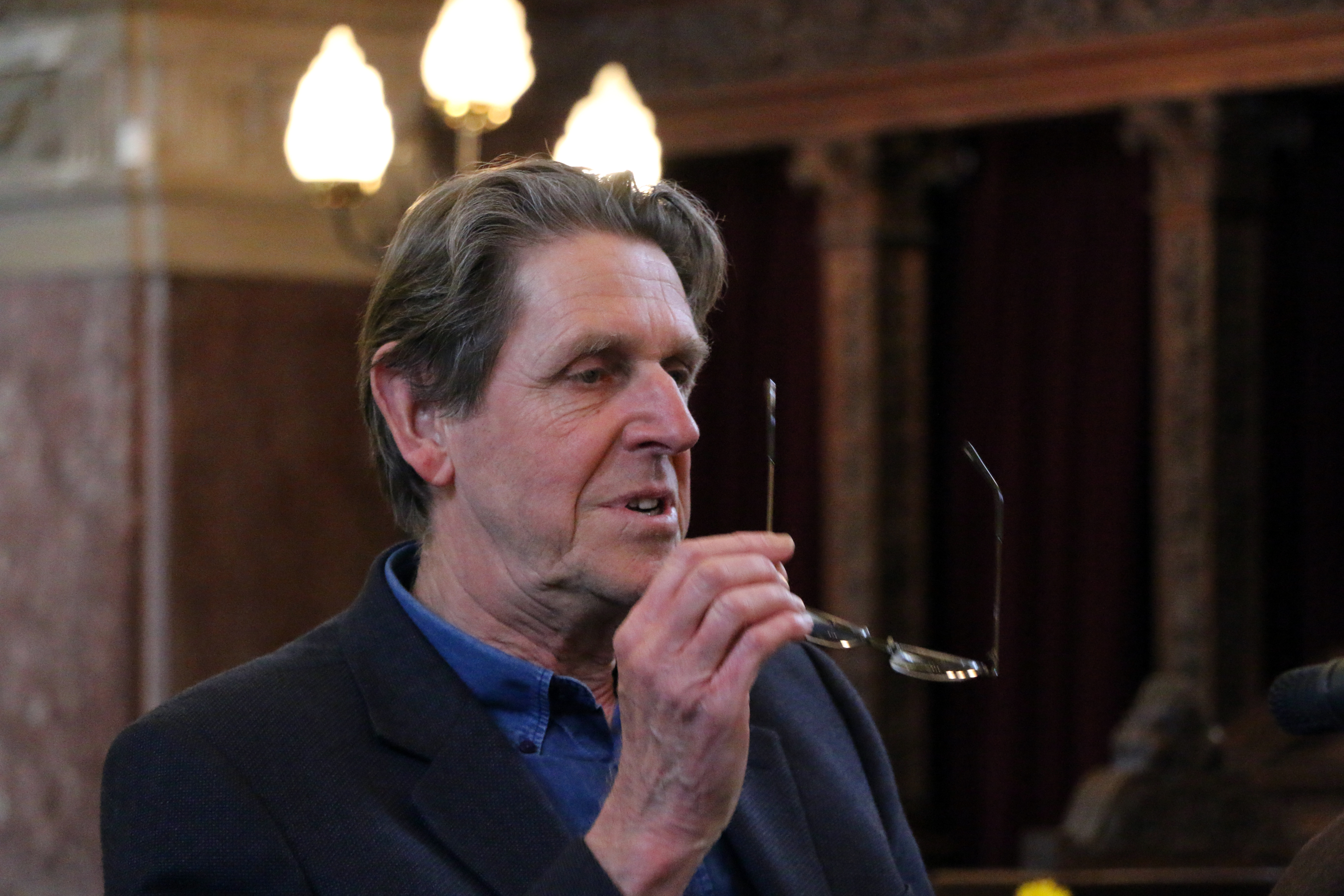
- Born: 27 July 1945 (age 81); Nottingham, England
- Spouse: Katherine Jane Lawley (m. 1978)
- Children: 2

Academic background
- Education: Oriel College, Oxford; (BA, 1967; DPhil, 1973)

Academic work
- Discipline: Historian
- Institutions: Keele University (1987–2014)

Charles Jeremy Nigel Townshend FBA (born 27 July 1945) is a British historian. His most prominent field of research is the history of British rule in Ireland, but is also a historian of British influence and rule in the Middle East during and after World War I, the era of Mandatory Palestine, Mandatory Iraq, and the Emirate of Transjordan.

== Career ==
He worked for most of his career as a Professor of International History at Keele University. He retired and took Emeritus status in 2014.

== Awards and Distinctions ==
- 2008 – Fellow of the British Academy

== Bibliography ==
=== Books ===
- Townshend, Charles (1975). The British Campaign in Ireland, 1919–1921: The Development of Political and Military Policies. Oxford: Oxford University Press. ISBN 978-0-19-821863-0.
- Townshend, Charles (1983). Political Violence in Ireland: Government and Resistance since 1848. Oxford: Oxford University Press. ISBN 978-0-19-820084-0.
- Townshend, Charles (1986). Britain's Civil Wars: Counterinsurgency in the Twentieth Century. London: Faber and Faber. ISBN 978-0-571-13802-9.
- Townshend, Charles (1993). Making the Peace: Public Order and Public Security in Modern Britain. Oxford: Oxford University Press. ISBN 978-0-19-822978-0.
- Townshend, Charles (1999). Ireland: The Twentieth Century. London: Arnold. ISBN 978-0-340-66335-6.
- Townshend, Charles (2002). Terrorism: A Very Short Introduction. Oxford: Oxford University Press. ISBN 978-0-19-960394-7. (Second edition published in 2011.)
- Townshend, Charles (2005). Easter 1916: The Irish Rebellion. London: Allen Lane. ISBN 978-0-14-190276-0.
- Townshend, Charles (2010). When God Made Hell: The British Invasion of Mesopotamia and the Creation of Iraq, 1914–1921. London: Faber and Faber. ISBN 978-0-571-23721-0. (Published in the United States in 2011 as Desert Hell: The British Invasion of Mesopotamia.)
- Townshend, Charles (2013). The Republic: The Fight for Irish Independence, 1918–1923. London: Allen Lane. ISBN 978-0-241-00349-7.
- Townshend, Charles (2021). The Partition: Ireland Divided, 1885–1925. London: Allen Lane. ISBN 978-0-14-198574-9.

=== Articles ===
- Townshend, Charles (1979). "The Irish Railway Strike of 1920: Industrial Action and Civil Resistance in the Struggle for Independence". Irish Historical Studies. 22 (83): 265–282. doi:10.1017/S0021121400113148. JSTOR 30008284. S2CID 182918322.
- Townshend, Charles (1979). "The Irish Republican Army and the Development of Guerrilla Warfare, 1916–1921". The English Historical Review. 94 (371): 318–345. doi:10.1093/ehr/XCIV.CCCLXXI.318. JSTOR 566849.
- Townshend, Charles (1982). "Martial Law: Legal and Administrative Problems of Civil Emergency in Britain and the Empire, 1800–1940". The Historical Journal. 25 (1): 167–195. doi:10.1017/S0018246X00009900. JSTOR 2638811. S2CID 159491362.
- Townshend, Charles (1988). "The Defence of Palestine: Insurrection and Public Security, 1936–1939". The English Historical Review. 103 (409): 917–949. doi:10.1093/ehr/CIII.CCCCIX.917. JSTOR 570262.
- Townshend, Charles (1989). "Military Force and Civil Authority in the United Kingdom, 1914–1921". Journal of British Studies. 28 (3): 262–292. doi:10.1086/385937. JSTOR 175572. S2CID 145081619.
- Townshend, Charles (1989). "The Making of Modern Irish Public Culture". The Journal of Modern History. 61 (3): 535–554. doi:10.1086/468292. JSTOR 1881350. S2CID 144555834.
- Townshend, Charles (1993). "Militarism and Modern Society". The Wilson Quarterly. 17 (1): 71–82. JSTOR 40258438.
- Townshend, Charles (1998). "The Meaning of Irish Freedom: Constitutionalism in the Free State". Transactions of the Royal Historical Society. 8: 45–70. doi:10.2307/3679288. JSTOR 3679288. S2CID 155766182.
- Townshend, Charles (2004). "Religion, War, and Identity in Ireland". The Journal of Modern History. 76 (4): 882–902. doi:10.1086/427571. JSTOR 10.1086/427571.
- Townshend, Charles (2006). "Making Sense of Easter 1916". History Ireland. 14 (2): 40–45. JSTOR 27725427.
