= Donald Jordan =

American football player (born 1962)

No. 49
- Position: Running back

Personal information
- Born: February 9, 1962 (age 64); Houston, Texas, U.S.
- Listed height: 6 ft 0 in (1.83 m)
- Listed weight: 210 lb (95 kg)

Career information
- High school: Madison (Houston)
- College: Houston
- NFL draft: 1984: 12th round, 330th overall pick

Career history
- Chicago Bears (1984); Houston Oilers (1987)*
- * Offseason or practice squad member only

Awards and highlights
- Second-team All-SWC (1983)
- Stats at Pro Football Reference

Donald Ray Jordan (born February 9, 1962) is an American former professional football running back who played one season with the Chicago Bears of the National Football League (NFL). He played college football for the Houston Cougars.

== Early life ==
Donald Ray Jordan was born on February 9, 1962, in Houston, Texas. He attended James Madison High School in Houston. He committed to play college football for the Houston Cougars of the University of Houston.

== College career ==
Jordan was a member of the Houston Cougars from 1980 to 1981 and a two-year letterman from 1982 to 1983. He rushed 14 times for 42 yards in 1981 while returning seven kicks for 135 yards. In 1982, he totaled 41 carries for 159 yards and two touchdowns, one catch for 11 yards, and four kick returns for 83 yards. He missing spring practice in 1983 due to knee surgery. Jordan made his first career start in the 1983 season opener against Rice, running for 138 yards and three touchdowns in a 45–14 victory. Overall, he rushed 191 times for 1,049 yards and seven touchdowns in 1983 while also catching seven passes for 67 yards and one touchdown. He was named second-team All-SWC by United Press International for the 1983 season.

== Professional career ==
Jordan was selected by the Chicago Bears in the 12th round, with the 330th overall pick, of the 1984 NFL draft. He officially signed with the team on June 15. He played in 13 games for the Bears in 1984, recording 11 rushing attempts for 70 yards, one reception for six yards, five kick returns for 62 yards, one fumble, and three fumble recoveries. He was placed on injured reserve on December 15, 1984. Jordan was released on August 27, 1985.

Jordan signed with the Houston Oilers on February 24, 1987. He was released on July 31, 1987.
