= Stubbe =

Stubbe is a surname borne by:

== People ==
- Christian Stubbe (born 1982), German archer
- Dirk Stubbe, 21st century South African politician
- Hans Stubbe (1902–1989), German agronomist and geneticist
- Hermann and Peter Stubbe (both died 1901), children murdered by Ludwig Tessnow
- Henry Stubbe (1632–1676), English physician and scholar
- JoAnne Stubbe (born 1946), American chemist
- John Stubbs (c. 1543–1591), also known as John Stubbe, English pamphleteer
- Peter Stumpp (died 1589), also known as Peter Stubbe, German farmer and alleged serial killer
- Richard Stubbe (died 1619), English politician
- Tom Stubbe (born 1981), Belgian cyclist

== Fictional characters ==
- Wilfried Stubbe, protagonist of Stubbe – Von Fall zu Fall, a German television series

== See also ==
- Stub (disambiguation)
- Stubbs (disambiguation)
- Stubbes, a surname
