= Stub =

Stub or Stubb may refer to:

== Shortened objects and entities ==
- Stub, a tree cut and allowed to regrow from the trunk; see pollarding
- Pay stub, a receipt or record that the employer has paid an employee
- Stub period, period of time over which interest accrues which is not equal to the usual interval between bond coupon
- Stub road, an unused road junction
- Stub (stock), the portion of a corporation left over after most but not all of it has been bought out or spun out
- Ticket stub, the portion of an admissions ticket that is retained by the ticket holder
- Cheque (check) stub, retained in the chequebook as a record of the cheques issued

== Computing and electronics ==
- Stub (distributed computing), a program that acts as a temporary replacement for a remote service or object
- Stub (electronics), a calculated length section of transmission line used to match impedance in transmission lines
- Method stub, a placeholder method for production code
- Stub network, in computer networking, a section of network with only one exit router to other networks
- Test stub, a test double that returns a particular value

== People ==
=== Given name ===
- Stub Wiberg (1875–1929), Norwegian actor

=== Nickname ===
- Stub Brown (1870–1938), American baseball player
- Stubb Ross (died 1987), Canadian airline entrepreneur
- Christopher B. "Stubb" Stubblefield (1931–1995), American barbecue restaurateur and chef, and musician

=== Surname ===
- Alexander Stubb (born 1968), President of Finland, Prime Minister of Finland from 2014 to 2015
- Ambrosius Stub (1705–1758), Danish poet
- Göran Stubb (born 1935), Finnish ice hockey executive and the father of Alexander Stubb
- Hans Stubb (1906–1973), German soccer player
- Christian Gottlieb Kratzenstein Stub (1783–1816), Danish painter
- Jens Stub (1764–1819), Norwegian politician
- Suzanne Innes-Stubb (born 1970), British–Finnish attorney and the wife of Alexander Stubb
- Sverre Stub (born 1946), Norwegian diplomat

== Other uses ==
- Stub Place, settlement in Cumbria, England
- Stubb, a character in the novel Moby-Dick by Herman Melville
  - Stubb Glacier, an Antarctic glacier named for the Moby-Dick character

== See also ==
- Stubbe, a surname
- Stubble (disambiguation)
- Stubbs (disambiguation)
