= John Stubbs (disambiguation) =

John Stubbs was a 16th-century English MP and pamphleteer.

John Stubbs may also refer to:

- John Stubbs (archer) (born 1965), British Paralympic archer
- John Stubbs (author) (1938–2015), Australian political journalist
- John Stubbs (cricketer) (born 1931), Australian cricketer
- John Stubbs (historian), British historian and author, see Samuel Johnson Prize
- John Howell Stubbs, American architectural preservationist and professor
- John O. Stubbs, Canadian academic
- John Stevenson Stubbs (1894–1924), First World War flying ace
- John William Stubbs (1821–1897), Irish mathematician and clergyman
- John Stubbs (priest), dean of Grahamstown
- John Stubbs (Quaker) (1627–1675), itinerant English Quaker minister and author

== See also ==
- John Heath-Stubbs (1918–2006), English poet and translator
- Jack Stubbs (1913–1997), American set decorator
