= Liam Donnelly (swim coach) =

Canadian swimming coach

Coaching career (HC unless noted)
- 1991-2021: Simon Fraser University

Accomplishments and honors

Championships
- 15 NAIA national collegiate titles

Awards
- Coach of the Year (NAIA)

Liam Donnelly is a former Canadian competitive swimmer and coach who managed Vancouver BC, Canada's Simon Fraser University varsity swim team for thirty years from 1991 through 2021, leading his teams to 15 NAIA national collegiate titles.

Donnelly began swimming with the Port Moody Aquarians, part of the British Columbia Summer Swimming Association (BCSSA) at the age of 5. He swam for many winters with the New Westminster Hyacks, and later coached there for 4 years.

While coaching with BCSSA's Esquimalt, his team received the Tom Lauriente Trophy for Sportsmanship. The Esquimalt Team trains at the large Aquatics facility at the Esquimalt Recreation Centre on Vancouver Island. Donnelly has been named Coach of the Year in several years by the National Association of Intercollegiate Athletics (NAIA) and had great success with his swimmers.

== Simon Fraser swim coach ==
Beginning as an Assistant Coach at Vancouver's Simon Fraser University's original campus on Burnaby Mountain in 1991, he became one of Canada's youngest Varsity Head Coaches in 1992, and retired as Head Coach in 2021. While there, he had 17 Collegiate National Championship teams, and coached swimmers to 180 National Championship wins with 67 in National record times.

On July 10, 2009, Simon Fraser became the first non-U.S. member of the NCAA. Its teams would be part of NCAA Division II, Great Northwest Athletic Conference which had no swim team, so Donnelly’s teams joined the Pacific Coast Swim Conference, consisting of teams from Divisions I, II and III, as well as the NAIA.

During Donnelly's tenure, athletes from Simon Fraser University won 374 national individual titles and established 62 records at NAIA national championships. His coaching tenure coincided with the emergence of three NCAA individual champions, 42 All-American honorees, and 12 Scholar All-Americans. His record also includes swimmers who represented Canada at international competitions such as the World Aquatics Championships, Universiade, and Pan American Games, with three swimmers setting new Canadian records.

His history at Simon Fraser included an incident that caused significant controversy but led to a resolution. In May 1997, after a sexual harassment conviction led to his dismissal, Donnelly was reinstated within two months following reports of differing accounts involving him and one of his student-athletes. The incident resulted in the resignation of the president of SFU and prompted a revision of the institution's harassment policies.

Donnelly accumulated thirteen years of international coaching, with his teams winning eleven international medals. He coached the Canadian National team to compete in the World Championships, World University Games, the Pan Pacific Games, and the Pan American Games.

=== Outstanding swimmers ===
Simon Fraser swimmers coached by Donnelly who have performed exceptionally include: Ryan Lauren, 1999 Pan Pacific Bronze medalist Graham Duthie and 1992 Olympian Diana Ureche.

=== Honours ===
As a coach at Esquimalt, his team was awarded the Tom Lauriente Trophy, and he has been voted a Coach of the Year by the National Association of Intercollegiate Athletics (NAIA) many times. He is a member of the BCSSA Pool of Fame, and was recognized by the College Swimming Coaches Association 100 greatest coaches of the Century in 2021.

== See also ==
- Simon Fraser University 1997 harassment controversy
