= Stubbs (surname) =

Stubbs is an English surname derived from the Middle English nickname Stubb. Notable people with the name include:

- Alan Stubbs (born 1971), English football player
- Austin Stubbs, American politician
- C. J. Stubbs (born 1996), American professional baseball player
- Christopher B. "Stubb" Stubblefield (1931–1995), American barbecue restaurateur and chef
- Christopher Stubbs (born 1958), American astrophysicist
- Charles William Stubbs (1845–1912), English clergyman
- Drew Stubbs (born 1984), American baseball player
- Wing Commander Duncan Stubbs (born 1961), British RAF musical director
- Eddie Stubbs (born 1961), American radio disc jockey
- Edward J. Stubbs (1833–1887), American shipwright
- Frank Edward Stubbs (1888–1915), World War I recipient of the Victoria Cross
- Franklin Stubbs (born 1960), American baseball player
- Garrett Stubbs (born 1993), American professional baseball player
- George Stubbs (1724–1806), English painter
- Hal Clement (Harry Clement Stubbs, 1922–2003), American science fiction writer
- Harry Stubbs (actor) (1874–1950), English-born American character actor
- Imogen Stubbs (born 1961), British actress
- Jean Stubbs (1926–2012), British writer.
- John Heath-Stubbs (1918–2006), British poet and translator
- John Stubbs (disambiguation), multiple people
- Josefina Stubbs (born 1959), Dominican is a development practitioner
- Levi Stubbs (1936–2008), American singer with The Four Tops
- Lewis Stubbs (1878–1958), Canadian politician
- Marie Stubbs (born 1939), British educator
- Peter Stubbs (special effects artist), Australian special effects artist
- Philip Stubbs (c.1555–1610), English pamphleteer
- Ray Stubbs (born 1956), British sports broadcaster
- Reginald Edward Stubbs (1876–1947), governor of Hong Kong
- Rennae Stubbs (born 1971), Australian tennis player
- Richard Stubbs (born 1957), Australian radio presenter and comedian
- Slater B. Stubbs (died 1867), American politician from Maryland
- Stephen Stubbs (born 1951), American lutenist and director
- Theodore K. Stubbs (1847–1911), American politician from Pennsylvania
- Troy Stubbs, American politician in Alabama
- Una Stubbs (1937–2021), British actress and dancer
- Walter R. Stubbs (1858–1929), 18th governor of Kansas
- William Stubbs (1825–1901), English historian and bishop of Oxford
- William Carter Stubbs (1843–1924), American agricultural chemist
