= Rachel Marsden =

Canadian journalist (born 1974)

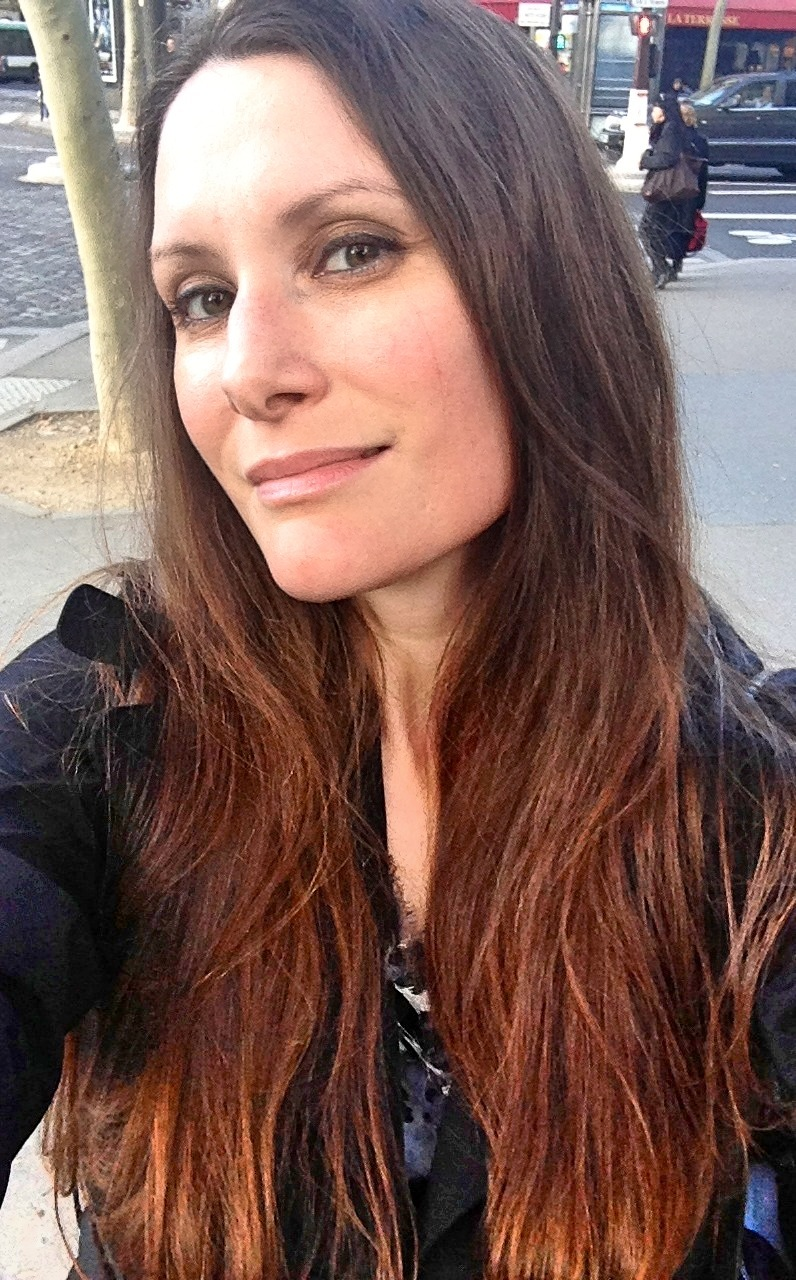
- Born: December 2, 1974 (age 51); Port Coquitlam, British Columbia, Canada
- Occupations: Columnist; political commentator; lecturer
- Website: rachelmarsden.com

Rachel Marsden (born December 2, 1974) is a Canadian conservative political columnist and television commentator based in Paris. Her weekly column is syndicated by Tribune Content Agency. She has hosted talk shows on Fox News and Sputnik News, and has written for the Toronto Sun and several other major news outlets. She is also a regular contributor to the English and French services of the RT news channel.

== Early life and education ==
Marsden grew up in Port Coquitlam, British Columbia. As a high school student at Terry Fox Secondary School in 1992, Marsden received a bronze Governor General's Academic Medal.

Marsden was inspired to go into journalism by listening to Canadian radio personality Jack Webster when she was growing up. In 2002, she took a political journalism training course at the National Journalism Center in Washington, DC.

Marsden graduated with a Bachelor of Science degree from Simon Fraser University (SFU) with a minor in French language. As an SFU student, Marsden came to public attention when she was at the centre of the Simon Fraser University 1997 harassment controversy, in which she and a swimming coach publicly accused each other of sexual harassment. The coach was dismissed, then exonerated and re-hired by the university after doubts were raised about the credibility of Marsden's accusations against him. Over ten years later, Marsden was interviewed by the university's newspaper and said of the events: "[The administration] were more interested in quelling negative PR than defending the truth. I was told by SFU to keep quiet and say nothing to the media. My only regret is that I listened to them."

In November 2025, Marsden stated that she was enrolled in law school.

== Career ==
Marsden first broke into journalism in the early 2000s, writing for conservative web sites. In 2002, she worked for the Free Congress Research and Education Foundation.

Before the 2004 federal election in Canada, she was hired under an alias by Gurmant Grewal, a Conservative member of the Parliament of Canada, to assist his constituency office with press releases, but was forced out when her identity was revealed by the press while criminal charges of harassment were pending against her.

In 2005, she had a column at National Post for two months. Later that year she was hired by the Toronto Sun as a weekly opinion columnist, and wrote for them until November 2007. Her syndicated column has appeared in the online edition of The Daily Telegraph, The Spectator, and Townhall.com, and reprinted in Wall Street Journal and the New York Daily News. In 2004 Marsden appeared as a guest on Dennis Miller's CNBC talk show. In 2005 she appeared twice as a guest panelist on The O'Reilly Factor on the Fox News Channel. Marsden appeared on the Fox News Channel until 2007.

In 2007, she moved from Toronto to New York City and was hired as one of five panelists on Red Eye w/ Greg Gutfeld, a late-night talk show, where she stayed for five months. On May 30, 2007, Marsden was dismissed from Red Eye and escorted out of the Fox studio by security guards. She explained that her departure was due to a change in the show's format, and that being escorted out was standard procedure. She appeared once in October 2007, as a guest panelist on CNN's The Situation Room. Marsden has been compared to Ann Coulter in opinion, presentation and appearance.

In 2009, Marsden moved to France, and since then she has been a regular panelist on LCP Politique Matin, carried on the state-owned parliamentary television channel La Chaîne parlementaire in France. She taught courses at Sciences Po as enseignante, or adjunct member of the teaching staff.

In November 2011, she self-published a novel, American Bombshell: A Tale of Domestic and International Invasion through Createspace.

== Personal life ==
In 1997 Marsden came to public attention for her role in the Simon Fraser University 1997 harassment controversy.

In 2002, Marsden was arrested after a man she had been dating for a year complained to police of being harassed and threatened by her. She pleaded guilty to criminal harassment and was given a conditional discharge and one year of probation.

In September 2007, a relationship between Marsden and an Ontario Provincial Police officer ended. She posted his photo and identified him on her blog as an anti-terrorism officer and wrote he had leaked secret anti-terrorism documents to her. The officer filed a complaint of harassment against Marsden, but this was later dropped. The OPP launched a separate internal investigation into the alleged conduct of the officer. His lawyer declared that he was cleared of any wrongdoing.

Marsden contacted Wikipedia co-founder Jimmy Wales in 2006 and said that her Wikipedia biography was libelous. Wales stated his involvement with her article was handled through the normal channels, and was "routine". He also says he "recused [himself] from any further official action", after their relationship became personal. On February 29, 2008, the Gawker news and gossip blog Valleywag claimed Wales and Marsden had entered into a relationship, and published instant messaging chats they allegedly exchanged. On the following day, Wales announced on his Wikipedia user page that he had broken up with her. Marsden, who learned about the breakup by reading about it on Wikipedia, turned to eBay and put up a T-shirt and sweater for auction that she said belonged to Wales.
