= Home Rule crisis =

1912–14 political and military crisis related to Irish Home Rule

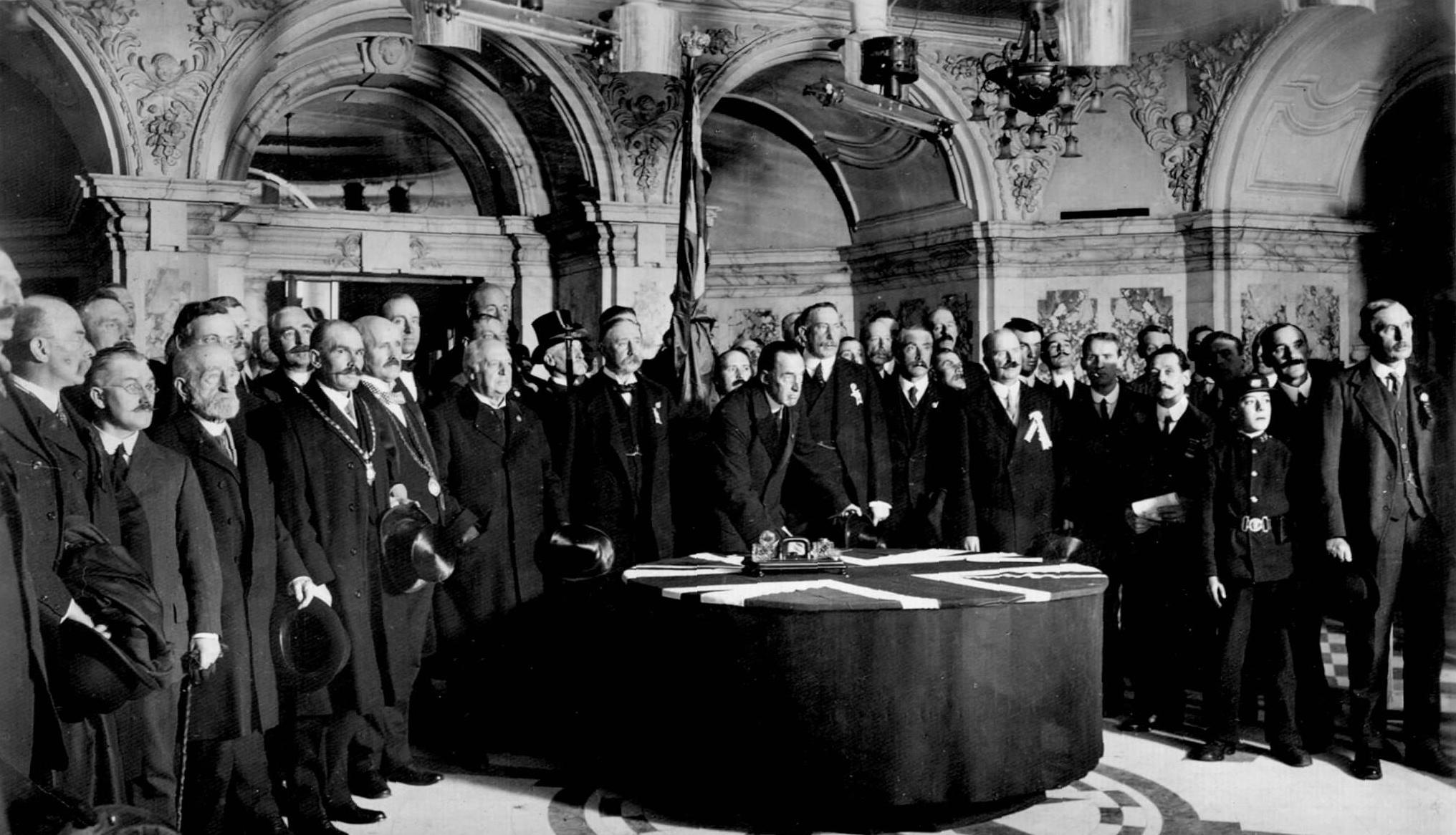
Edward Carson signing the Ulster Covenant, 1912. James Craig stands behind his left shoulder.

The Home Rule crisis was a political and military crisis in the United Kingdom of Great Britain and Ireland that followed the introduction of the Third Home Rule Bill in the House of Commons of the United Kingdom in 1912.

Unionists in Ulster determined to prevent any measure of home rule for Ireland and formed a paramilitary force, the Ulster Volunteers, which threatened to resist by force of arms the implementation of the Act and the authority of any Dublin Parliament. Irish nationalists responded by setting up the Irish Volunteers "to secure the rights and liberties common to all the people of Ireland". Both sides then began importing weapons and ammunition from Germany, in the Larne gun-running and Howth gun-running incidents. HM Government's ability to face down unionist defiance was thrown into question by the "Curragh incident", when dozens of British Army officers threatened to resign or face dismissal rather than deploy into Ulster (ostensibly to secure arms against Ulster loyalist seizure), forcing a climb-down by the government. The crisis was temporarily averted by the outbreak of World War I. The Home Rule Bill was enacted, but its implementation was suspended for the duration of the war.

== Background ==
The separate kingdoms of Ireland and Great Britain were merged on 1 January 1801 to form the United Kingdom of Great Britain and Ireland. Throughout the 19th century Irish opposition to the Union was strong, occasionally erupting in violent insurrection. In the 1830s and 1840s attempts had been made under the leadership of Daniel O'Connell to repeal the Act of Union 1800 and restore the Kingdom of Ireland, without breaking the connection with Great Britain. These attempts to achieve what was simply called Repeal, failed.

=== Struggle for Home Rule ===
In the 1870s, the Home Rule League under Isaac Butt sought to achieve a modest form of self-government for Ireland. Under this proposal, known as Home Rule, Ireland would remain part of the United Kingdom but would have limited self-government. With the passing of the Third Reform Act of 1884 the size of the electorate was increased considerably. In the 1885 United Kingdom general election the Irish Parliamentary Party took 86 seats thereby becoming the third largest party in Parliament. The cause for home rule in Ireland was then pursued by Charles Stewart Parnell and two attempts were made by Liberal ministries under British Prime Minister William Ewart Gladstone to enact home rule bills, accompanied by a revival of Ulster's Orange Order to resist any form of Home Rule. The Irish Government Bill 1886, personally advocated by Prime Minister William Ewart Gladstone as relinquishment of authority with honour rather than by compulsion and humiliation, was defeated in the Commons by 30 votes after the Liberal Unionists split from the Liberal Party to vote with the pro-unionist Conservative Party. The second Irish Government Bill 1893 was passed by the Commons but defeated in the House of Lords, where the Conservative and Liberal Unionist peers enjoyed a huge majority.

As early as 1893, plans were floated to raise 2,000–4,000 men, to drill as soldiers in Ulster. Many Ulster Unionists interpreted the southern and western violence directed against land grievances as pro-Home Rule (and thus believed Home Rule was appeasement of this violence), and resolved to defy the government militarily.

=== The Parliament Act ===
In 1909, a crisis erupted between the House of Lords and the Commons, each of which accused the other of breaking historic conventions. Chancellor of the Exchequer David Lloyd George, hoping to clear the way for an onslaught on the Lords' veto on legislation, framed his budget so the Lords were likely to reject it. After the Lords, hoping to force a general election, rejected the Finance Bill in November 1909, the Commons accused the Lords of breaking the convention of not rejecting a budget, and the Prime Minister H. H. Asquith appealed to the country.

The January 1910 General Election left the Liberals and Conservatives equally matched, with John Redmond's Irish Nationalists holding the balance of power in the House of Commons. The price of their support to pass the budget through the Commons (the Lords allowed it to pass, as it now had an electoral mandate) was a measure to curb the power of the House of Lords, the last obstacle to Home Rule. After the Lords rejected that measure, a second general election in December 1910 left the House of Commons arithmetic barely changed. If the Liberals were to defeat the House of Lords, they would need to keep the support of the Irish Party with a Home Rule Bill.

With the promise of co-operation from both the late king, Edward VII, and the new king, George V, the Liberals threatened to swamp the Lords with sufficient new Liberal peers to assure the Government a Lords majority. The peers backed down, and the Parliament Act 1911 was passed. The Lords now had no powers over finance bills and their unlimited veto was replaced with one lasting only two years; if the House of Commons passed a bill in the third year and was then rejected by the Lords it would still become law without the consent of the Upper House.

Although hints about Home Rule had appeared in ministers' speeches throughout 1910, Asquith only admitted that he intended to present a Home Rule Bill late in the December 1910 campaign, when over 500 seats had already finished voting, leading to complaints that the British public had not given that issue a mandate.

=== Third Home Rule Bill ===
On 11 April 1912, the Prime Minister introduced the Third Home Rule Bill which would grant Ireland self-government.

== Unionist opposition ==
In Ulster, Protestants were in a numerical majority. Much of the northeast was opposed to being governed from Dublin and losing their local supremacy – before the Act of Union in 1801, Protestants were the businesses, political élite and landed aristocracy in Ireland. Catholics had only been allowed to vote again in 1793 and been excluded from sitting in parliament until Catholic emancipation in 1829. Since the Act of Settlement 1701, no Catholic had ever been appointed Lord Lieutenant of Ireland, the head of the British government in a country that was 75% Catholic. In 1800 Protestant privilege in Ireland was based on land ownership, but this had diminished from 1885 with the Irish Land Acts which protected the rights of Irish tenants, the buying-out of landlords by a Land Commission and the introduction of elected local government.

By 1912 Protestant influence remained strong in Ulster, based not on farmland but on new industries that had been developed after 1800. Many Protestants in Ulster were Presbyterians, who had also been excluded from power before 1801, but now wanted to maintain the link with Britain. Further, Belfast had grown from 7,000 people in 1800 to 400,000 by 1900, and was then the largest city in Ireland. This growth had depended largely on trade within the British Empire, and it seemed that the proposed Dublin-based parliament elected by a largely rural country would have different economic priorities to those of Belfast and its industrial hinterland. The argument developed that 'Ulster' deserved separate treatment from the rest of Ireland, and that its majority was socially and economically closer to the rest of Britain. Unionists declared that the Irish economy had prospered during the Union, but with Ulster doing better than the rest of Ireland. The Protestants of Ulster had done well with their industries, particularly linen and shipbuilding. They feared a Dublin parliament run by farmers would hamper their prosperity by imposing barriers on trade with Britain. At the time Cork city was also a centre of textiles, heavy industry and shipbuilding on the Island of Ireland at that time. but was largely inhabited by Irish Nationalists who were willing to risk relative economic decline in exchange for the fulfilment of their political aspirations. In addition to economic factors Irish Unionists feared that they would suffer discrimination as a religious minority in a Catholic dominated Home Rule Ireland, taking up radical Quaker MP John Bright's slogan "Home Rule is Rome Rule". They were also concerned that Home Rule would be the first step in an eventual total separation of Ireland and Britain and that this was implicit threat to their cultural identity as being both British and Irish, Irish Nationalism drawing inherent distinction between the two.

=== Ulster crisis unfolds ===
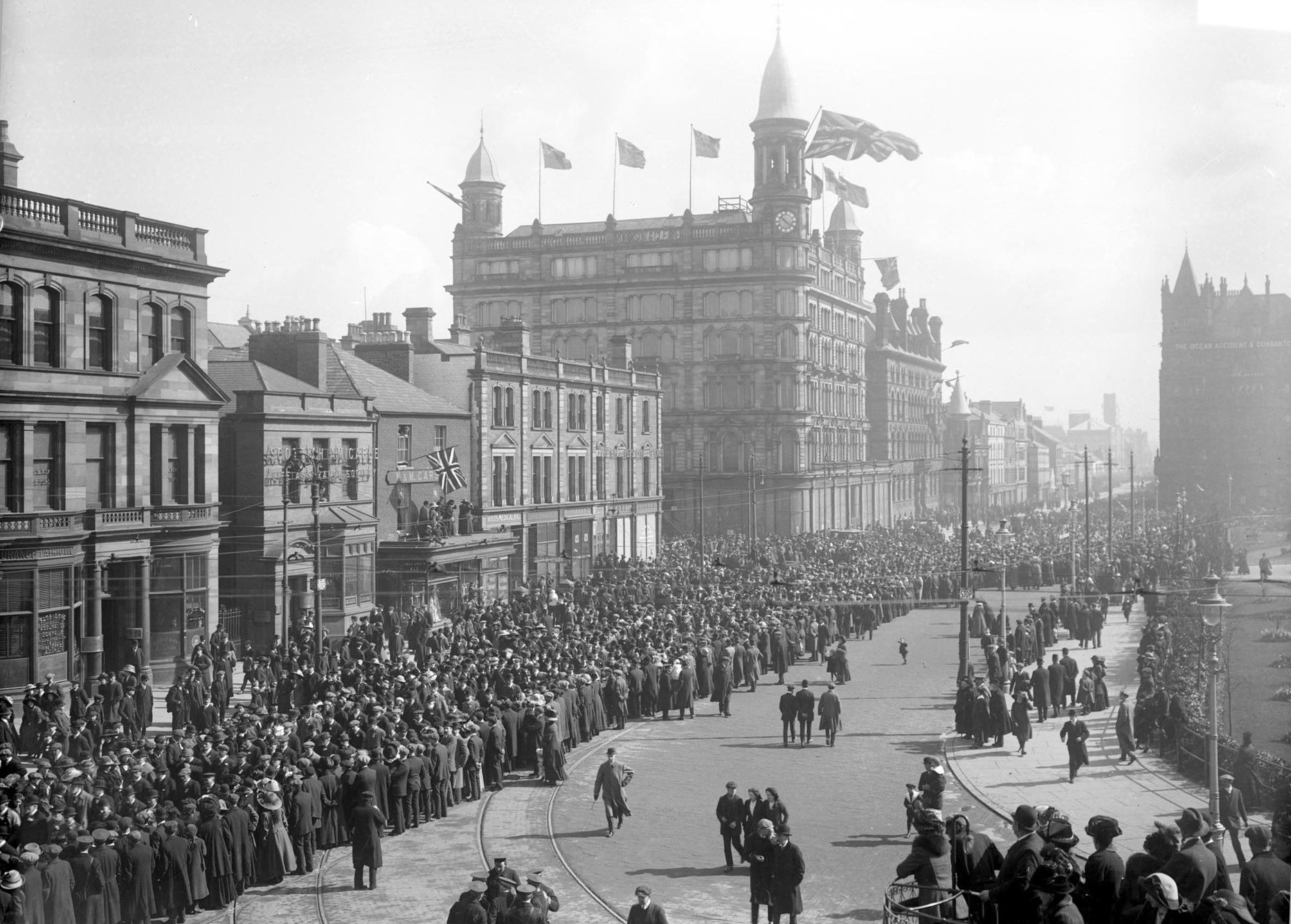
Unionist march in Belfast, 9 April 1912

All the arguments for and against Home Rule, in general or as proposed in the Bill, were made by both sides from the day it was introduced in April 1912. The main issue of contention during the parliamentary debates was the "coercion of Ulster", and mention was made of whether or which counties of Ulster should be excluded from the provisions of Home Rule. During the crisis the future Secretary of State for the Colonies Lord Milner established the Ulster Union Defence League in order to save "the white settler colony of Ulster from submersion in a sea of inferior Celts."

Irish Party leaders John Dillon and Joseph Devlin contending "no concessions for Ulster, Ulster will have to follow". On 'Ulster Day', 28 September 1912, over 500,000 Unionists signed the Ulster Covenant pledging to defy Home Rule by all means possible, drawn up by Irish Unionist leader Sir Edward Carson and organised by Sir James Craig, who in January 1911 had spoken of a feeling in Ulster that Germany and the German Emperor would be preferred to the "rule of John Redmond, Patrick Ford (veteran Fenian) and the Molly Maguires".

Unionists continued to demand that Ulster be excluded, the solution of partition appealing to Craig; Carson, however, as a Dublin man, did not want partition, which would leave 250,000 Southern Unionists at the mercy of a huge nationalist majority. He was willing to talk partition hoping that Redmond would give up Home Rule rather than agree to it. Redmond underestimated the resilience and strength of their resistance and thought they were bluffing and would accept Home Rule after Parliament passed it. On New Year's Day 1913, Carson moved an amendment to the Home Rule Bill in the House of Commons, to exclude all nine counties of Ulster and was supported in this by Bonar Law, then leader of the Conservative opposition.

Represented mainly by the Ulster Unionist Party and backed by the Orange Order, unionists founded early in 1912 the Ulster Volunteers. They were formed from 100,000 local militia and were reviewed marching by Carson that April. The Unionist Council reorganised the volunteers in January 1913 into the paramilitary Ulster Volunteer Force (UVF), who threatened to resist by physical force the implementation of the Act and the authority of any restored Dublin Parliament by force of arms, fearing that Dublin rule would mean the ascendency of Catholicism—in the words of one MP, that "'home rule' in Ireland would prove to be 'Rome Rule'" Later that year Carson and other leading men in Ulster were fully prepared to abandon the Southern Unionists, Carson's concern for them largely exhausted.

The Nationalists in turn raised the Irish Volunteers from late 1913 and planned to help Britain enforce the Act whenever it was passed, and to oppose Ulster separatism. In the Curragh incident of 20 March 1914, dozens of army officers stationed in Ireland offered to resign or accept dismissal rather than enforce Home Rule on Ulster. In April 1914 the Ulster Volunteers illegally imported 24,000 rifles from Germany in the Larne gun-running, being worried that force would be used to impose the Act upon the northeast. Nationalists, led by John Redmond, were adamant that any partition was unacceptable, and he declared that they could never assent to the mutilation of the Irish nation. "Ireland is a unit ... the two-nation theory is to us an abomination and a blasphemy". In June 1914 Erskine Childers imported 900 German rifles for the Irish Volunteers in his yacht, the Asgard, in the Howth gun-running. In mid-July Padraig Pearse complained of Redmond's takeover of the Volunteers, that he wanted to arm them for the wrong reasons – "not against England, but against the Orangemen". It seemed that Ireland would slide into a civil war.

The economic arguments for and against Home Rule were hotly debated. The case in favour was put by Erskine Childers' The Framework of Home Rule (1911) and the arguments against by Arthur Samuels' Home Rule Finance (1912). Both books assumed Home Rule for all of Ireland; by mid-1914 the situation had changed dramatically.

=== The shaping of Partition ===
Even before the Bill became law, questions arose about proposals to exclude Ulster from the Act. At the Bill's third reading on 21 May several members asked about a proposal to exclude the whole of Ulster for six years; it seemed remarkable, as the proposal was being made as a new amending Bill in the House of Lords, where the government had less support. Liberal and Irish government supporters were instantly critical of any effort to water down the existing Bill. Lord Hugh Cecil, a Conservative MP, was also mystified, saying: "Let them bring in their amending Bill under the Standing Orders before next Tuesday. It is perfectly manifest that somebody is going to be tricked. There is no genuine honest reason for making a secret of this kind. My hope is that it is the Nationalist party who are going to be tricked. It may be them, or it may be us, but that somebody is going to be tricked is perfectly plain ..."

It now appears that in late May Asquith sought any solution that would avoid, or at least postpone, an Irish civil war. He had not been frank about the new temporary-partition possibility, leaving everyone wondering what, exactly, they were voting for in the main Bill, when it might be seriously altered by the as-yet-unseen Amending Bill that was to be launched in the House of Lords.

Sir Edward Carson and the Irish Unionist Party (mostly Ulster MPs) backed by a Lords' recommendation, supported the government's Amending Bill in the Lords on 8 July 1914 for the "temporary exclusion of Ulster" from the workings of the future Act, but the number of counties (four, six or nine) and whether exclusion was to be temporary or permanent, all still to be negotiated.

The compromise proposed by Asquith was straightforward. Six counties of the northeast of Ireland (roughly two-thirds of Ulster), where there was arguably or definitely a Protestant majority, were to be excluded "temporarily" from the territory of the new Irish parliament and government, and to continue to be governed as before from Westminster and Whitehall. How temporary the exclusion would be, and whether northeastern Ireland would eventually be governed by the Irish parliament and government, remained an issue of some controversy.

Redmond fought tenaciously against the idea of partition, but conceded only after Carson had forced through an Amending Bill which would have granted limited local autonomy to Ulster within an all-Ireland settlement. The British government in effect accepted no immediate responsibility for the political and religious antagonisms which in the end led to the partition of Ireland, regarding it as clearly an otherwise unresolvable internal Irish problem. To them, the Nationalists had led the way towards Home Rule from the 1880s without trying hard enough to understand Unionist apprehensions, and were instead relying on their mathematical majority of electors. In the background, the more advanced nationalist views of ideologues such as D. P. Moran had nothing to offer the Unionists.

William O'Brien alone made a concerted effort throughout 1912–13 to accommodate Unionist concerns in his All-for-Ireland League (AFIL) political programme, prepared to concede any reasonable concessions to Ulster, rejected by both the Irish Party and Catholic clergy. After numerous interjections during prolonged debates in the Commons, the eight Independent AFIL Party MPs abstained from voting on the final passing of the Bill on 25 May, in protest that no account had been taken of Protestant minority concerns and fears. The AFIL stating the Bill was in effect a "partition deal" after the government introduced Carson's Amending Bill into the House of Lords to give effect to the exclusion of Ulster constructed on the basis of county option and six-year exclusion, the same formula rejected by Unionists in March. To save endless debate in parliament, George V called a Buckingham Palace Conference with two MPs from each of the British Liberal and Conservative parties, and two each from the nationalists and unionists, held between 21 and 24 July, which achieved very little, except a flicker of understanding between Carson and the Nationalists, that if Ulster were to be excluded, then in its entirety, that the province should come in or out as a whole.

== The passing of the Bill ==
With the outbreak of war with Germany in August 1914, Asquith decided to abandon his Amending Bill, and instead rushed through a new bill the Suspensory Act 1914 which was presented for Royal Assent simultaneously with both the Government of Ireland Act 1914 and the Welsh Church Act 1914; although the two controversial Bills had now finally reached the statute books on 18 September 1914, the Suspensory Act ensured that Home Rule would be postponed for the duration of the conflict and would not come into operation until the end of the war. The Ulster question was 'solved' in the same way: through the promise of amending legislation which was left undefined.

Unionists were in disarray, wounded by the enactment of Home Rule. and by the absence of any definite arrangement for the exclusion of Ulster. The Unionist opposition in Parliament claimed that this manoeuvre by Asquith was a breach of the political truce agreed on at the start of the war. However, with the Home Rule Bill effectively put into limbo, and the arguments surrounding it still capable of being resurrected before home rule was actually to come into operation, Unionist politicians soon left the issue aside in the face of more pressing war concerns.

Nationalists, in the belief that independent self-government had finally been granted, celebrated the news with bonfires alighting the hill-tops across the south of Ireland. But as the Act had been suspended for the duration of what was expected to be a short war, this decision was to prove crucial to the subsequent course of events.

== Aftermath ==
The outbreak of the war, and Ireland's participation in it, ended the Home Rule crisis at a stroke. Carson committed his Ulster Volunteers to the war effort, and when on 3 August 1914 Redmond, in the House of Commons, said that the Irish Volunteers would undertake the defence of Ireland, in co-operation with the Ulster Volunteers, the Foreign Secretary, Sir Edward Grey, said that "the one bright spot in the very dreadful situation is Ireland. The position in Ireland ... is not a consideration among the things we have to take into account now." On 18 September 1914 the Home Rule Bill received Royal Assent, but at the same time a Suspensory Act was passed to stop it coming into effect until after the war, and it was made clear that an Amending Act would be re-introduced before it became operative.

On the outbreak of war, however, the Irish Republican Brotherhood (IRB) began planning an insurrection. The Easter Rising took place in April 1916. As a result of the Rising, and the executions and mass imprisonment that followed it, the Irish people became disillusioned with the nationalist Home Rulers. This became apparent in the North Roscommon by-election of February 1917, when Count Plunkett, father of the executed 1916 leader Joseph Plunkett, defeated the Irish Party candidate in what had hitherto been a safe seat. The Conscription Crisis of 1918 further galvanised support for political separatism. A month after the end of the war, the Irish party was routed by Sinn Féin in the 1918 general election, leading to the establishment of the First Dáil and the Declaration of Independence.

The Government of Ireland Act 1920 partitioned Ireland, setting up separate Home Rule Parliaments in Dublin and in Northern Ireland. The Anglo-Irish Treaty, which ended the Irish War of Independence, led to the creation of the self-governing Irish Free State in 1922. In reference to the achievement of a separate status of Ulster, Winston Churchill commented: "...if Ulster had confined herself simply to constitutional agitation, it is extremely improbable that she would have escaped inclusion in a Dublin Parliament." The Crisis unified unionists, defining Protestant allegiances thereafter.
