= Stubbes =

Stubbes is a surname. Notable people with the surname include:

- John Stubbes, 15th-century British Anglican archdeacon
- Katherine Stubbes, 16th-century English woman and subject of the biography A Chrystall Glasse for Christian Women

== See also ==
- Stubbs (disambiguation)
