= Simon Fraser University 1997 harassment controversy =

Incident between a coach and student in Canada

The 1997 Simon Fraser University harassment controversy was a series of events at Simon Fraser University, in British Columbia, Canada. In the case at the center of the controversy, Rachel Marsden, then a student, and Liam Donnelly, a swimming coach, accused each other of sexual harassment.

Following an internal hearing that the coach declined to participate in, he was dismissed, but reinstated after the case went public. The case was widely reported in the Canadian press because of the topic of sexual harassment, and controversy over the procedures for investigating it. Ultimately, the case led to the resignation of university president John Stubbs and the reopening and reversal of eleven prior sexual harassment decisions by the university as well as the revision of its harassment policies.

== Case ==
In late 1996, Simon Fraser University (SFU) student Rachel Marsden and SFU swimming coach Liam Donnelly lodged complaints with the SFU harassment office against one another over events that occurred in 1994 and 1995. Marsden's formal complaint involved "seven allegations of unwanted sexual attention, two allegations of intimidating behaviour and a general charge of psychological sexual harassment." Donnelly denied any romantic relationship with Marsden and claimed that she sexually harassed him.

== SFU process ==
The university harassment procedures required a hearing before a panel made up of three members of the university community. On the advice of his lawyer, the coach dropped his own complaint against Marsden and took it instead to the Royal Canadian Mounted Police (RCMP). No charges were laid after Donnelly made the complaint. In addition, he did not attend the hearing of Marsden's complaint against him. The panel met, heard Marsden's evidence, and finalized its decision. The result was that Donnelly was fired on May 23, 1997.

The panel's report, however, was later leaked to the media. In it the panelists admitted that the specific incidents about which the student complained appeared insignificant and innocuous, but when "the sum total" was considered, it was determined that her complaint was true on a balance of probability. The panel's report, issued on October 11, 1996, recommended that Donnelly be dismissed and that Marsden be financially compensated, given counselling, and be helped with her academic career.

After dismissing his lawyer and hiring another, Donnelly appealed the ruling and went public with his side of the story. At this time, his colleagues and team-members corroborated his version of events. SFU refused to reopen the hearing, insisting that Donnelly's boycott of the hearing was itself sufficient justification for his dismissal. University policy, however, allowed for employees to file for arbitration in dismissal cases, which Donnelly did. Marsden was invited to participate, but declined. As a first step in the arbitration process, Donnelly and the university went into voluntary mediation. They agreed to reinstate Donnelly on the grounds that "the findings of the harassment panel were based on Ms. Marsden's credibility. Inconsistencies between her statements before the panel and her response to Mr. Donnelly's harassment complaint cast doubt on her credibility." However, Marsden was not a party to this arbitration and the case never went to any court.

SFU rehired Donnelly and committed to pay his legal fees up to $35,000, a sum that was raised to $60,000 a year later.

== Institutional consequences ==
The SFU administration was heavily criticized for its handling of the case, including criticism from the faculty. The president of SFU, John Stubbs, approved a secret settlement with Marsden by which she was given $12,000 to compensate her for a scholarship she failed to receive, lost summer employment and injuries to her feelings.

As a result of the case, SFU radically revised its policies for dealing with harassment. John Stubbs, who had endorsed Donnelly's dismissal, resigned in December 1997 as university president in the wake of the scandal, although he remained on the university faculty. SFU also reopened ten other harassment cases and reversed their decisions.

== Societal consequences ==
Due to the controversy, media in Canada have been much more cautious about reporting on harassment cases before they are heard in court.

== See also ==
- Human rights in Canada
