= Partition of Ireland =

1921 division of Ireland into two jurisdictions

Political map of present-day Ireland

The Partition of Ireland (Irish: críochdheighilt na hÉireann) was the process by which the government of the United Kingdom of Great Britain and Ireland (UK) divided Ireland into two self-governing polities: Northern Ireland and Southern Ireland. It was enacted on 3 May 1921 under the Government of Ireland Act 1920. The Act intended both territories to remain within the United Kingdom and contained provisions for their eventual reunification. The smaller Northern Ireland territory was created with a devolved government (Home Rule) and remained part of the UK. Although the larger Southern Ireland was also created, its administration was not recognised by most of its citizens, who instead recognised the self-declared 32-county Irish Republic.

Ireland had a largely Catholic nationalist majority who wanted self-governance or independence. Prior to partition, the Irish Parliamentary Party used its control of the balance of power in the British Parliament to persuade the government to introduce Home Rule Bills that would give Ireland a devolved government within the UK. This led to the Home Rule crisis (1912–14), when Ulster unionists founded a large paramilitary organisation (at least 100,000 men), the Ulster Volunteers, that could be used to prevent Ulster from being ruled by an Irish government. Although the Government of Ireland Act 1914 (to create a single administration) was passed, implementation was deferred due to the First World War (1914–18). Support for Irish independence grew during the war, particularly in the aftermath of the 1916 Easter Rising (an armed rebellion against British rule).

The Irish republican political party Sinn Féin won most Irish constituencies in the 1918 Westminster election. Rather than taking their seats at Westminster, the party convened a separate Irish parliament and declared an independent Irish Republic covering the whole island. This led to the Irish War of Independence (1919–21), a guerrilla conflict between the Irish Republican Army (IRA) and British forces. In 1920 the British government introduced another Bill to create two devolved governments: one for six of the Ulster counties (Northern Ireland) and one for the rest of the island (Southern Ireland). This was passed as the Government of Ireland Act 1920, and came into force as a fait accompli on 3 May 1921. Following the 1921 elections, Ulster unionists formed a Northern Ireland government. During 1920–22, in what became Northern Ireland, partition was accompanied by violence in defence or opposition to the new settlement. In the first half of 1922, the IRA launched a failed "Northern Offensive" into border areas of Northern Ireland. The capital, Belfast, saw "savage and unprecedented" communal violence, mainly between Protestant and Catholic civilians. More than 500 people were killed and more than 10,000 became refugees, most of them from the Catholic minority.

The Irish War of Independence resulted in a truce in July 1921 and led to the Anglo-Irish Treaty that December. Under the Treaty, the territory of Southern Ireland would leave the UK and become the Irish Free State. Northern Ireland's parliament could vote it in or out of the Free State, and a commission could then redraw or confirm the provisional border. The Northern government chose to remain in the UK. On 6 December 1922 (a year after the signing of the Anglo-Irish Treaty), Ireland was partitioned. In 1925, the Boundary Commission proposed small changes to the border, but they were not implemented.

Since partition, most Irish nationalists/republicans continue to seek a united and independent Ireland, while Ulster unionists/loyalists want Northern Ireland to remain part of the UK. Over the years the Unionist governments of Northern Ireland have been accused of discrimination against the Irish nationalist and Catholic minority. In 1967 Unionists opposed a civil rights campaign to end discrimination, viewing it as a republican front. This helped spark the Troubles (c. 1969–1998), a thirty-year conflict in which more than 3,500 people were killed. Under the 1998 Good Friday Agreement, the Irish and British governments and the main political parties agreed to a power-sharing government in Northern Ireland, and that the status of Northern Ireland would not change without the consent of a majority of its population. The Treaty also reaffirmed an open border between both jurisdictions.

== Background ==
=== Irish Home Rule movement ===
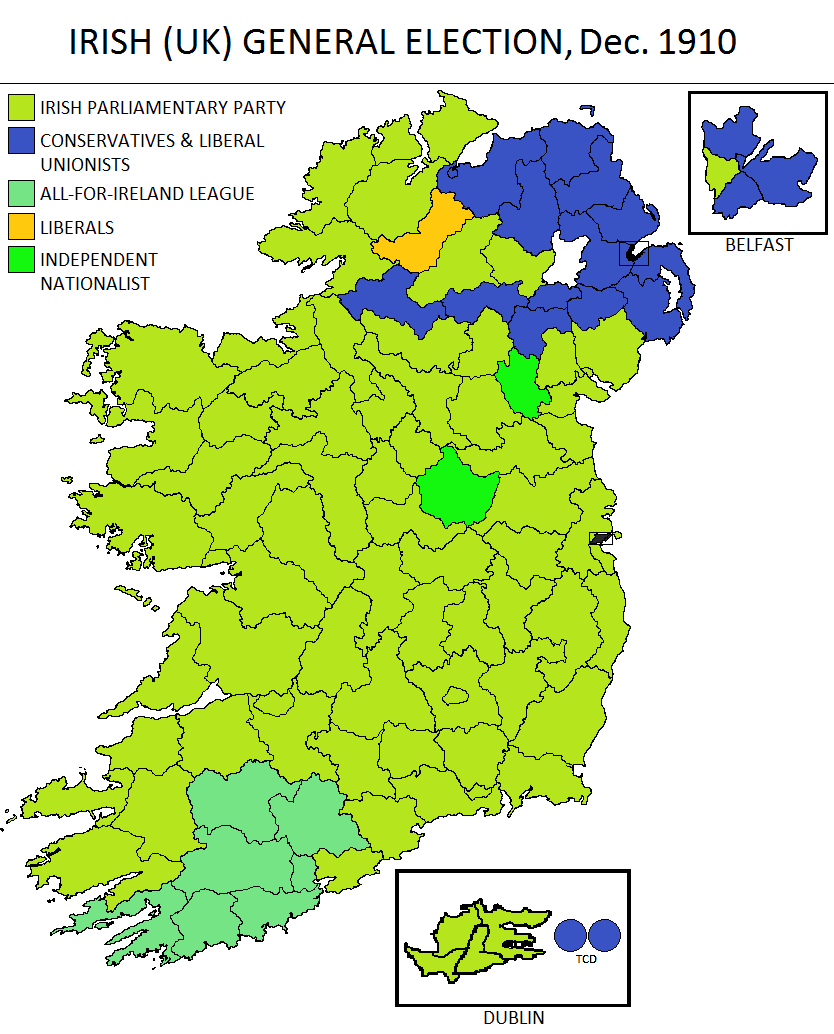
Results in Ireland of the December 1910 United Kingdom general election showing a large majority for the Irish Parliamentary Party

During the 19th century, the Irish nationalist Home Rule movement campaigned for Ireland to have self-government while remaining part of the United Kingdom. The nationalist Irish Parliamentary Party won most Irish seats in the 1885 general election. It then held the balance of power in the British House of Commons, and entered into an alliance with the Liberals. IPP leader Charles Stewart Parnell convinced British Prime Minister William Gladstone to introduce the First Irish Home Rule Bill in 1886. Protestant unionists in Ireland opposed the Bill, fearing industrial decline and religious persecution of Protestants by a Catholic-dominated Irish government. English Conservative politician Lord Randolph Churchill proclaimed: "the Orange card is the one to play", in reference to the Protestant Orange Order. The belief was later expressed in the popular slogan, "Home Rule means Rome Rule". Partly in reaction to the Bill, there were riots in Belfast, as Protestant unionists attacked the city's Catholic nationalist minority. The Bill was defeated in the Commons.

Gladstone introduced a Second Irish Home Rule Bill in 1892. The Irish Unionist Alliance had been formed to oppose home rule, and the Bill sparked mass unionist protests. In response, Liberal Unionist leader Joseph Chamberlain called for a separate provincial government for Ulster where Protestant unionists were a majority. Irish unionists assembled at conventions in Dublin and Belfast to oppose both the Bill and the proposed partition. The unionist MP Horace Plunkett, who would later support home rule, opposed it in the 1890s because of the dangers of partition. Although the Bill was approved by the Commons, it was defeated in the House of Lords.

=== Home Rule crisis ===
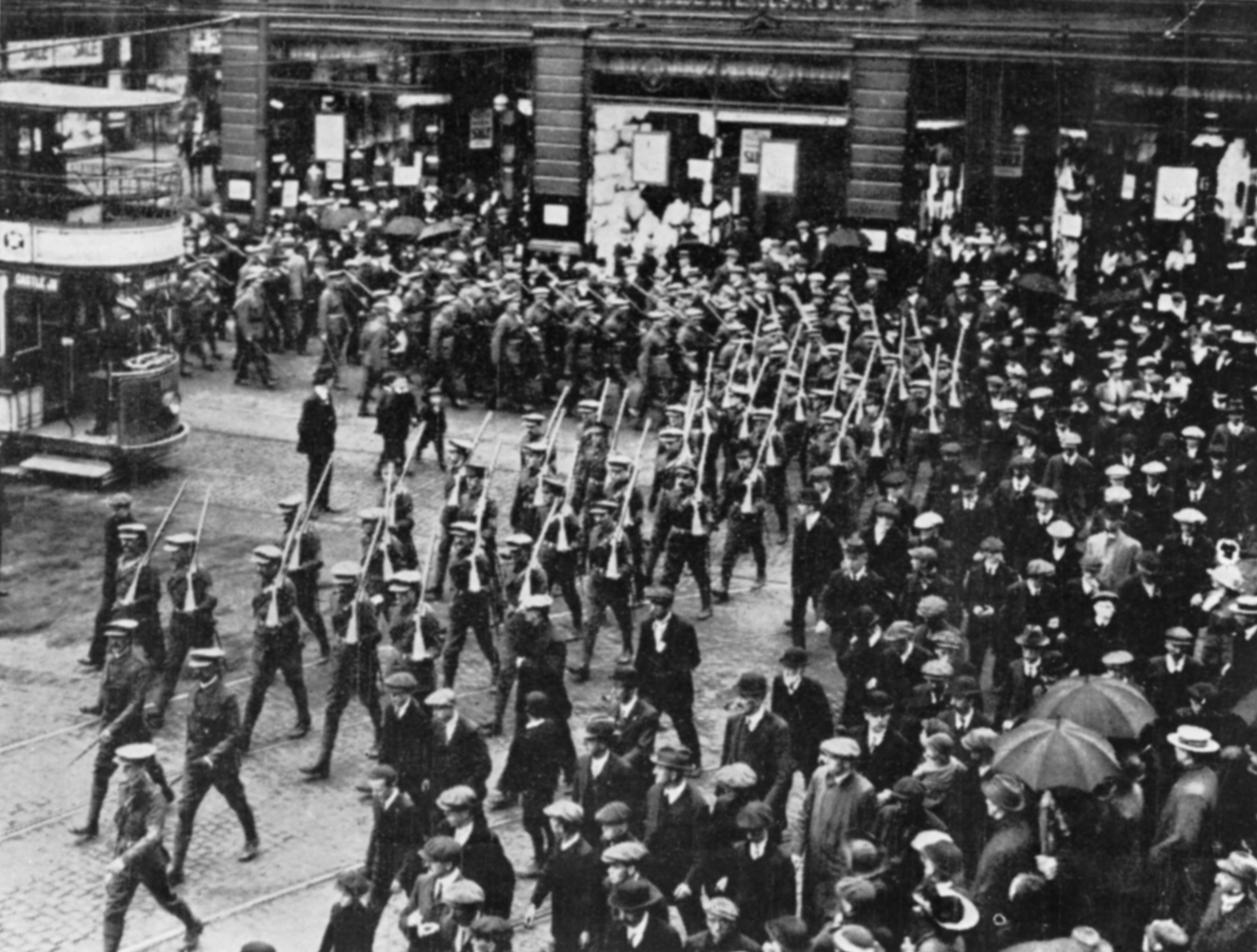
Ulster Volunteers marching in Belfast, 1914

Following the December 1910 election, the Irish Parliamentary Party again agreed to support a Liberal government if it introduced another home rule Bill. The Parliament Act 1911 meant the House of Lords could no longer veto Bills passed by the Commons, but only delay them for up to two years. British Prime Minister H. H. Asquith introduced the Third Home Rule Bill in April 1912 (received royal assent on 18 September 1914). An amendment to the Bill was introduced calling for the partition of Ireland. In June 1912 Asquith spoke in Parliament rejecting the suggestion of partition:

"You can no more split Ireland into parts than you can split England or Scotland into parts...You have an essential unity of race and temperament, although I agree that unhappily dissensions have been rank, partially by religion, and partially, by the organisation of partisanship. The more Irishmen are encouraged and empowered to cooperate in the great works of governing their own country, the more convinced am I that these differences will disappear."

Unionists opposed the Bill, but argued that if Home Rule could not be stopped then all or part of Ulster should be excluded from it. Irish nationalists opposed partition, although some were willing to accept Ulster having some self-governance within a self-governing Ireland ("Home Rule within Home Rule"). Winston Churchill made his feelings about the possibility of the partition of Ireland clear: "Whatever Ulster's right may be, she cannot stand in the way of the whole of the rest of Ireland. Half a province cannot impose a permanent veto on the nation. Half a province cannot obstruct forever the reconciliation between the British and Irish democracies." The 1911 census reported Catholic majorities in five of the nine counties of Ulster, two of the Catholic majority counties (Tyrone and Fermanagh) would later be incorporated into Northern Ireland.

In September 1912, more than 500,000 Unionists signed the Ulster Covenant, pledging to oppose Home Rule by any means and to defy any Irish government. They founded a large paramilitary movement, the Ulster Volunteers, to prevent Ulster from becoming part of a self-governing Ireland. They also threatened to establish a Provisional Ulster Government. In response, Irish nationalists founded the Irish Volunteers to ensure that Home Rule was implemented. The Ulster Volunteers smuggled 25,000 rifles and three million rounds of ammunition into Ulster from the German Empire, in the Larne gun-running of April 1914. The Irish Volunteers also smuggled weaponry from Germany in the Howth gun-running that July. On 20 March 1914, in the "Curragh incident", many of the highest-ranking British Army officers in Ireland threatened to resign rather than deploy against the Ulster Volunteers. This meant that the British government could legislate for Home Rule but could not be sure of implementing it. Ireland seemed to be on the brink of civil war.

=== Exclusion of Ulster ===
In May 1914, the British government introduced an amending Bill to the Third Home Rule Act allowing for the "temporary exclusion of Ulster" from Home Rule. Some Ulster unionists were willing to tolerate the 'loss' of some mainly-Catholic areas of the province (the Ulster counties of Monaghan, Cavan and Donegal). The Chief Secretary for Ireland Augustine Birrell tasked civil servants to draw up plans for the temporary exclusion of part of Ulster from Home Rule. In May 1914 three border boundary options were proposed - one option recommended that Counties Tyrone and Fermanagh, south County Armagh, south County Down, the cities of Newry and Derry should be left under the proposed Irish Parliament. There was then debate over how much of Ulster should be excluded and for how long, and whether to hold referendums in each county. The Chancellor of the Exchequer Lloyd George supported "the principle of the referendum...each of the Ulster Counties is to have the option of exclusion from the Home Rule Bill."

==== Buckingham Palace Conference ====
In July 1914, George V called the Buckingham Palace Conference to allow Unionists and Nationalists to come together and discuss the issue of partition, but the conference achieved little. At the Conference the future Secretary of State for the Colonies Lord Milner recommended to the Unionist leader Edward Carson that he "stick out for the six counties as a minimum’. He added, ‘There is no particular virtue in counties...as long as the excluded area is one solid block."

After much negotiations in 1914, John Redmond - the longtime leader of the largest political party in Ireland (the Irish Parliamentary Party) agreed to the temporary exclusion of some areas of Ulster. In June 1916 (after the Easter Rising) Lloyd George asked for Redmonds approval for six counties (now to include Tyrone and Fermanagh) to be temporarily excluded (four counties had been requested in 1912 and 1914). Redmond was assured by the British Prime Minister and the entire Cabinet that voters in all counties excluded from Home Rule would be permitted to vote on joining a Home Rule Ireland (a vote was never held). Redmond was also "guaranteed" that all excluded counties were to be returned to Home Rule Ireland after six years. On 20 July 1916 Redmond was removed from any further negotiations with the British government. He spoke on the floor of the House of Commons:

I was informed, on behalf of the Cabinet, that negotiations and communications and consultations with me had been struck off, and that I would receive no communication from the Cabinet until they had come to a decision, behind my back, upon proposals which I had never seen and which they refused to submit to me. I asked them what the nature of these new proposals was, and I was told that the Cabinet did not desire to consult me about them, and until they had come to a decision I would be told nothing...The next communication I received was on Saturday last, when the Minister for War and the Home Secretary requested me to call and see them at the War Office. They then informed me that another Cabinet Council had been held, and that it had been decided, mark you, decided, to insert in the Bill two entirely new provisions, one providing for the permanent exclusion of Ulster, of the six Ulster counties...and I was given to understand in so many words that this decision was not put before me for the purpose of discussion or consultation, that the decision was absolute and final, and the right hon. Gentlemen described themselves to me simply as messengers, without any power or authority to discuss these questions in any way whatever with me, and they informed me that it was the intention of the Government to introduce a Bill containing these provisions practically whether we liked it or not.

=== First World War & Irish Convention ===
The Home Rule crisis was interrupted by the outbreak of the First World War in August 1914, and Ireland's involvement in it. Asquith abandoned his Amending Bill, and instead rushed through a new Bill, the Suspensory Act 1914, which received Royal Assent together with the Home Rule Bill (now Government of Ireland Act 1914) on 18 September 1914. The Suspensory Act ensured that Home Rule would be postponed for the duration of the war with the exclusion of some or all of Ulster still to be decided.

During the First World War, support grew for full Irish independence, which had been advocated by Irish republicans. In April 1916, republicans took the opportunity of the war to launch a rebellion against British rule, the Easter Rising. It was crushed after a week of heavy fighting in Dublin. The harsh British reaction to the Rising fuelled support for independence, with republican party Sinn Féin winning four by-elections in 1917.

The British parliament called the Irish Convention in an attempt to find a solution to its Irish Question. It sat in Dublin from July 1917 until March 1918, and comprised both Irish nationalist and Unionist politicians. It ended with a report, supported by nationalist and southern unionist members, calling for the establishment of an all-Ireland parliament consisting of two houses with special provisions for Ulster unionists. The reports proposal for the setting up of an all-Ireland parliament was passed by 51 votes to 18. The amendment to exclude Ulster from the jurisdiction of a national parliament was voted down by 52 votes to 19. The majority of southern Unionists voted for the all-Ireland parliament proposal. The report was, however, rejected by the Ulster unionist members, and since Sinn Féin had not taken part in the proceedings, the convention was considered a failure.

In 1918, the British government attempted to impose conscription in Ireland and argued there could be no Home Rule without it. This sparked outrage in Ireland and further galvanised support for the republicans.

== 1918 General Election, Long Committee, Violence & 1921 Northern Ireland General Election ==
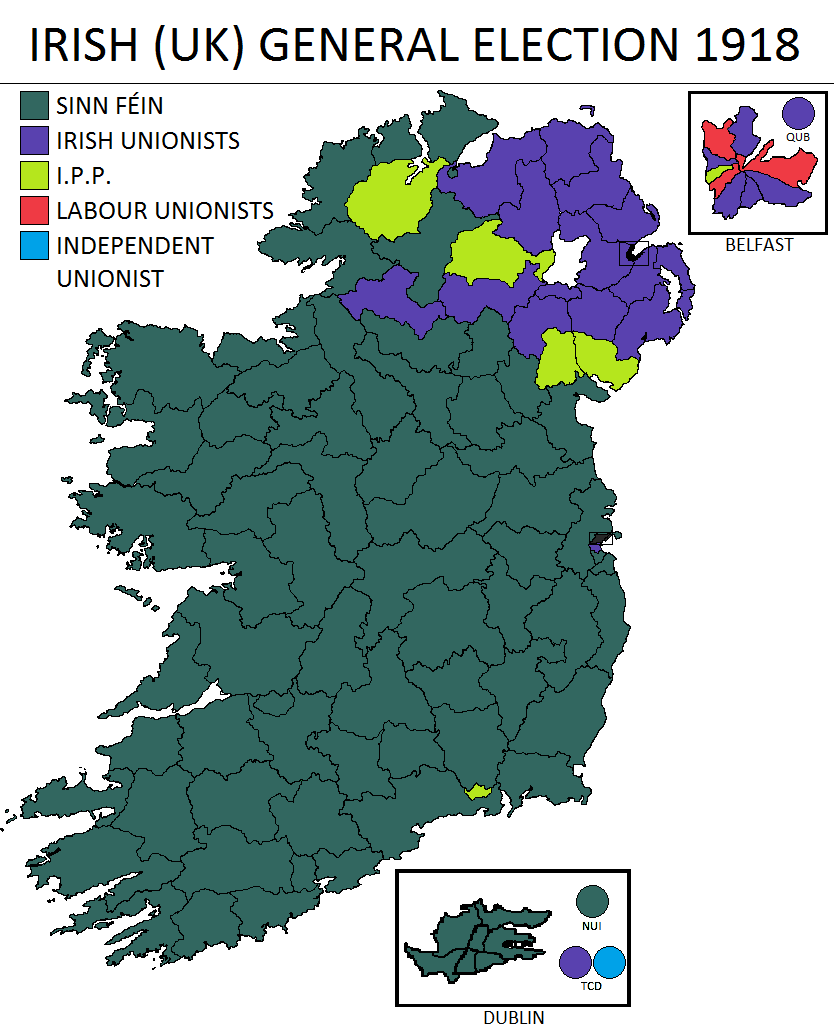
Result of the 1918 general election in Ireland showing the dramatic swing in support for Sinn Féin

In the December 1918 general election, Sinn Féin won the overwhelming majority of Irish seats. In line with their manifesto, Sinn Féin's elected members boycotted the British parliament and founded a separate Irish parliament (Dáil Éireann), declaring an independent Irish Republic covering the whole island. Unionists, however, won most seats in northeastern Ulster and affirmed their continuing loyalty to the United Kingdom. Many Irish republicans blamed the British establishment for the sectarian divisions in Ireland, and believed that Ulster Unionist defiance would fade once British rule was ended.

In an attempt to bring about the secession of Ireland from the UK, the Irish War of Independence began on 21 January 1919 with the Soloheadbeg ambush. A guerrilla war developed as the Irish Republican Army (IRA) began attacking British forces. The British authorities outlawed the Dáil in September 1919.

=== Three, Four, Five, Six or Nine counties of Ulster? ===
The number of Ulster counties that might be excluded from an Irish Home Rule parliament varied over the years. During the Gladstone era it was proposed that all nine counties of Ulster be excluded. A nine county exclusion was again proposed in September 1912, during this time the Unionist leader Edward Carson repeatedly spoke of the exclusion of all nine counties of Ulster. In April 1912 Winston Churchill proposed that three counties (Down, Antrim and Londonderry) be excluded. Later that year Bonar Law added County Armagh thereby recommending that four counties be excluded from Home Rule. During Asquith's time in office the Liberal Chief Whip proposed that "roughly five counties" be excluded. Finally, in May 1916 Lloyd George proposed that six counties be excluded from a Dublin Home Rule parliament. However, in a 29 May 1916 letter to the Unionist leader Edward Carson, Lloyd George made clear that the exclusion should not be temporary: "We must make it clear that at the end of the provisional period Ulster does not, whether she wills it or not, merge in the rest of Ireland." In April 1920, a Unionist from Cookstown, County Tyrone commented on the threat that partition of nine counties would pose: "...the whole nine will be such a rickety parliament that it must almost at once be absorbed into the Dublin one." By May 1920 the Ulster Unionist Council (UUC) (which later became the Ulster Unionist Party) backed a six county exclusion. At the UUC meeting on 27 May 1920 only 80 of 390 delegates voted for the inclusion of nine counties into what became Northern Ireland.

=== Long Committee ===
In September 1919, British Prime Minister Lloyd George tasked a committee with planning Home Rule for Ireland within the UK. Headed by English Unionist politician Walter Long, it was known as the 'Long Committee'. The makeup of the committee was Unionist in outlook and had no Nationalist representatives (the elected members of Sinn Féin had boycotted the British Parliament). James Craig (the future 1st Prime Minister of Northern Ireland) and his associates were the only Irishmen consulted during this time. During the summer of 1919, Long visited Ireland several times, using his yacht as a meeting place to discuss the "Irish question" with the Lord Lieutenant of Ireland John French and the Chief Secretary for Ireland Ian Macpherson.

Prior to the first meeting of the committee, Long sent a memorandum to the British Prime Minister recommending two parliaments for Ireland (24 September 1919). That memorandum formed the basis of the legislation that partitioned Ireland – the Government of Ireland Act 1920. Long had been given the task of promoting passage of the Government of Ireland Act and held secret negotiations with the Irish Unionist leaders Edward Carson and James Craig. In return for their active support in passing the Act, Long (with authorisation from the British Cabinet) gave the Unionist leaders "countless pledges" that a six county Ulster would endure and be maintained by the British Government.

At the first meeting of the committee (15 October 1919) it was decided that two devolved governments should be established — one for the nine counties of Ulster and one for the rest of Ireland, together with a Council of Ireland for the "encouragement of Irish unity". The Long Committee felt that the nine-county proposal "will enormously minimise the partition issue...it minimises the division of Ireland on purely religious lines. The two religions would not be unevenly balanced in the Parliament of Northern Ireland." Most northern unionists wanted the territory of the Ulster government to be reduced to six counties, so that it would have a larger Protestant/Unionist majority. Long offered the Committee members a deal – "that the Six Counties ... should be theirs for good ... and no interference with the boundaries". This left large areas of Northern Ireland with populations that supported either Irish Home Rule or the establishment of an all-Ireland Republic. The results from the last all-Ireland election (the 1918 Irish general election) showed Nationalist majorities in the envisioned Northern Ireland: Counties Tyrone and Fermanagh, Derry City and the Constituencies of Armagh South, Belfast Falls and Down South.

Many Unionists feared that the territory would not last if it included too many Catholics and Irish Nationalists but any reduction in size would make the state unviable. The six counties of Antrim, Down, Armagh, Londonderry, Tyrone and Fermanagh comprised the maximum area unionists believed they could dominate. The remaining three counties of Ulster had large Catholic majorities: Cavan 81.5%, Donegal 78.9% and Monaghan 74.7%. On 29 March 1920 Charles Craig (son of Sir James Craig and Unionist MP for County Antrim) made a speech in the British House of Commons where he made clear the future make up of Northern Ireland: "The three Ulster counties of Monaghan, Cavan and Donegal are to be handed over to the South of Ireland Parliament. How the position of affairs in a Parliament of nine counties and in a Parliament of six counties would be is shortly this. If we had a nine counties Parliament, with 64 members, the Unionist majority would be about three or four, but in a six counties Parliament, with 52 members, the Unionist majority, would be about ten. The three excluded counties contain some 70,000 Unionists and 260,000 Sinn Feiners and Nationalists, and the addition of that large block of Sinn Feiners and Nationalists would reduce our majority to such a level that no sane man would undertake to carry on a Parliament with it. That is the position with which we were faced when we had to take the decision a few days ago as to whether we would call upon the Government to include the nine counties in the Bill or be settled with the six."

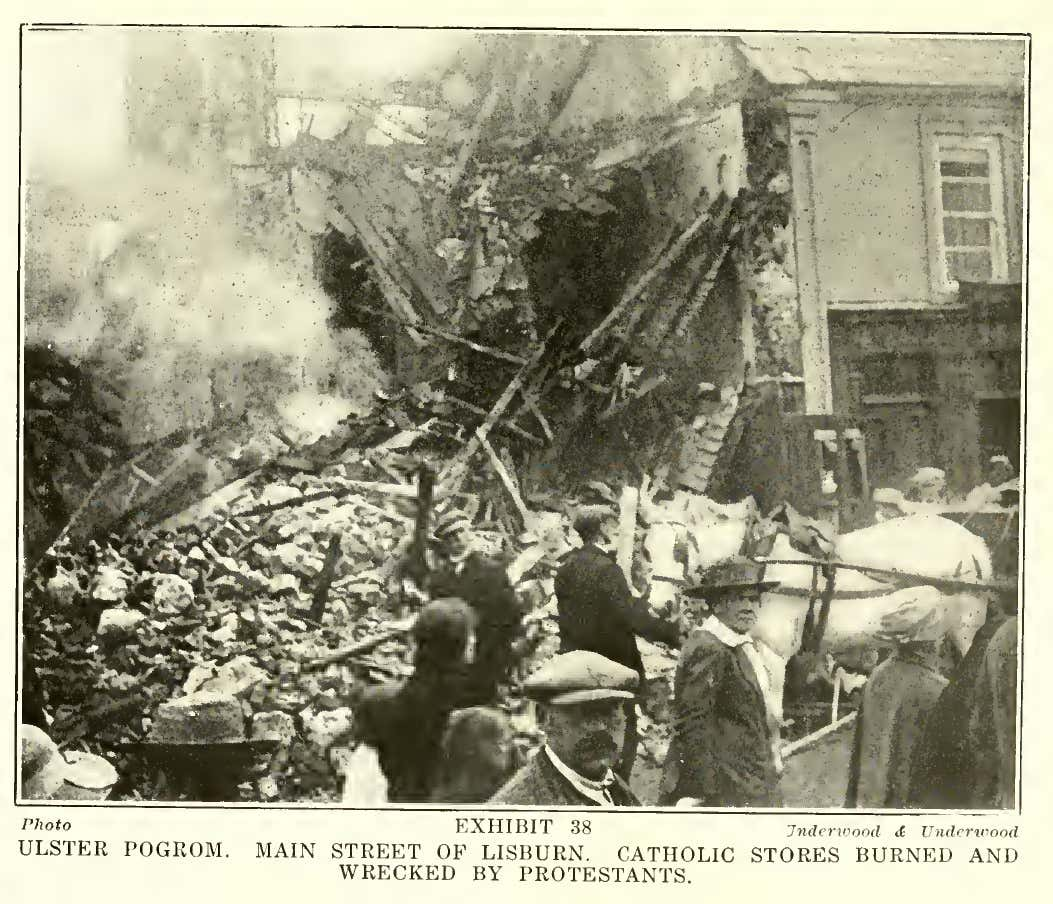
Catholic-owned businesses destroyed by loyalists in Lisburn, August 1920

=== Violence ===
In what became Northern Ireland, the process of partition was accompanied by violence, both "in defence or opposition to the new settlement". The IRA carried out attacks on British forces in the north-east, but was less active than in the south of Ireland. Protestant loyalists in the north-east attacked the Catholic minority in reprisal for IRA actions. The January and June 1920 local elections saw Irish nationalists and republicans win control of Tyrone and Fermanagh county councils, which were to become part of Northern Ireland, while Derry had its first Irish nationalist mayor. In summer 1920, sectarian violence erupted in Belfast and Derry, and there were mass burnings of Catholic property by loyalists in Lisburn and Banbridge. Loyalists drove 8,000 "disloyal" co-workers from their jobs in the Belfast shipyards, all of them either Catholics or Protestant labour activists. In his Twelfth of July speech, Unionist leader Edward Carson had called for loyalists to take matters into their own hands to defend Ulster, and had linked republicanism with socialism and the Catholic Church. In response to the expulsions and attacks on Catholics, the Dáil approved a boycott of Belfast goods and banks. The 'Belfast Boycott' was enforced by the IRA, who halted trains and lorries from Belfast and destroyed their goods.

Conflict continued intermittently for two years, mostly in Belfast, which saw "savage and unprecedented" communal violence between Protestant and Catholic civilians. There was rioting, gun battles and bombings. Homes, business and churches were attacked and people were expelled from workplaces and from mixed neighbourhoods. The British Army was deployed and an Ulster Special Constabulary (USC) was formed to help the regular police. The USC was almost wholly Protestant and some of its members carried out reprisal attacks on Catholics. A British Army Major (Ambroise Ricardo) stated that, because the USC was locally recruited, "a group of personal blood feuds will last for generations to come". From 1920 to 1922, more than 500 people were killed in Northern Ireland and more than 10,000 became refugees, most of them Catholics.

=== 1921 Election in Counties Tyrone/Fermanagh ===
In the first election to the Parliament of Northern Ireland (24 May 1921), the 1921 Northern Ireland general election returned Sinn Féin/Nationalist Party majorities: 54.7% Nationalist / 45.3% Unionist in Fermanagh – Tyrone (which was a single constituency). In a letter dated 7 September 1921 from Lloyd George to the President of the Irish Republic Eamon de Valera regarding Counties Fermanagh and Tyrone, the British Prime Minister stated that his government had a very weak case on the issue "of forcing these two Counties against their will" into Northern Ireland.

On 28 November 1921 both Tyrone and Fermanagh County Councils declared allegiance to the new Irish Parliament (Dail). On 2 December the Tyrone County Council publicly rejected the "...arbitrary, new-fangled, and universally unnatural boundary". They pledged to oppose the new border and to "make the fullest use of our rights to mollify it". While speaking in the British House of Parliament on 14 December 1921, the British Prime Minister remarked on the possibility of including Tyrone and Fermanagh into Northern Ireland: "There is no doubt—certainly since the Act of 1920—that the majority of the people of two counties prefer being with their Southern neighbours to being in the Northern Parliament." On 21 December 1921, the Fermanagh County Council passed the following resolution: "We, the County Council of Fermanagh, in view of the expressed desire of a large majority of people in this county, do not recognise the partition parliament in Belfast and do hereby direct our Secretary to hold no further communications with either Belfast or British Local Government Departments, and we pledge our allegiance to Dáil Éireann." Shortly afterwards, Dawson Bates the long time (1921–1943) Minister of Home Affairs (Northern Ireland) authorised that both County Councils offices be seized (by the Royal Irish Constabulary), the County officials expelled, and the County Councils dissolved. The newly formed Northern Cabinet decided to suspend any local authority that refused to cooperate with the Northern Ministry, a total of 16 local authorities were suspended.

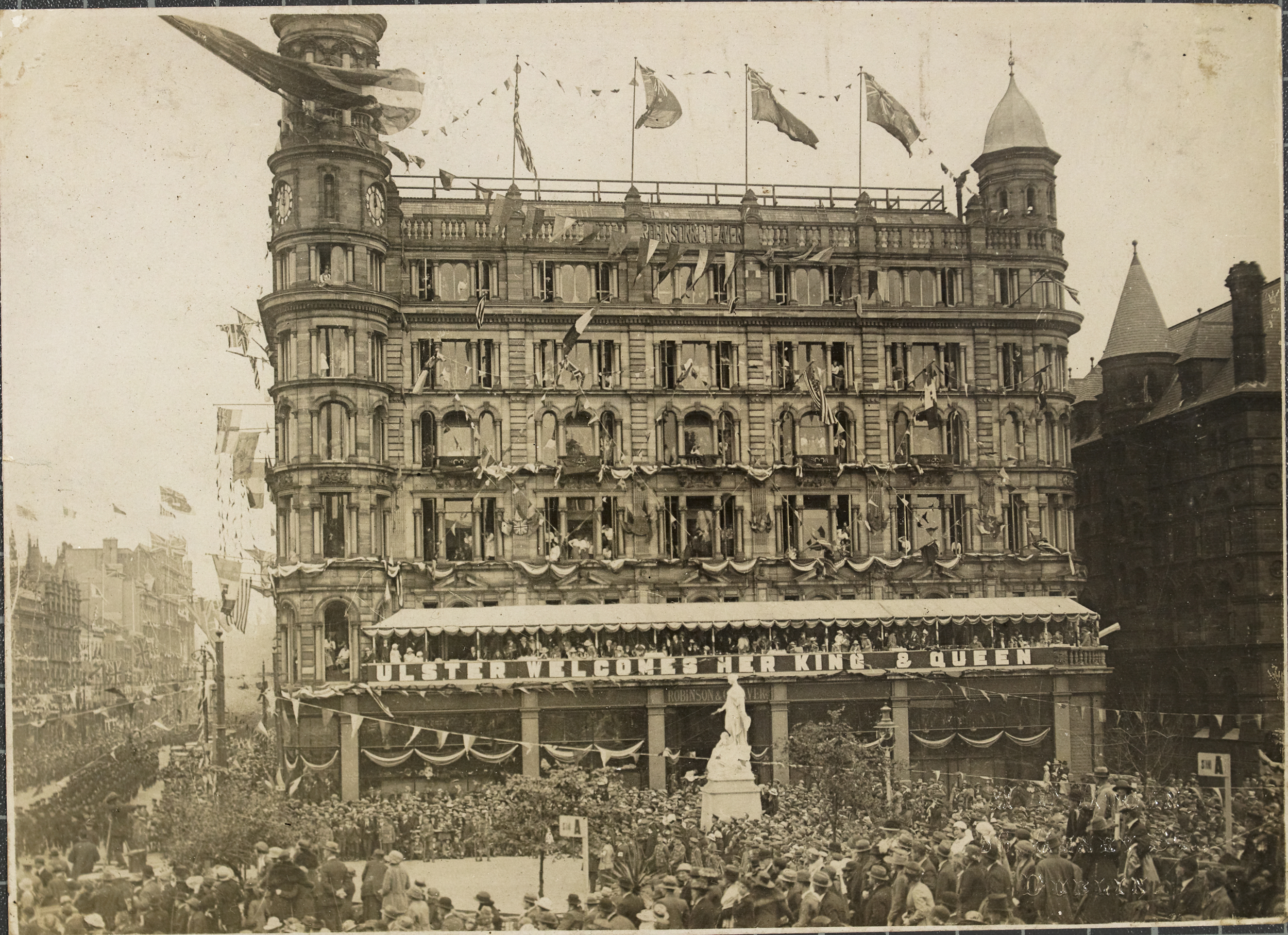
Crowds in Belfast for the state opening of the Northern Ireland Parliament on 22 June 1921

== Government of Ireland Act 1920 ==
The British government introduced the Government of Ireland Bill in early 1920 and it passed through the stages in the British parliament that year. It would partition Ireland and create two self-governing territories within the UK, with their own bicameral parliaments, along with a Council of Ireland comprising members of both. Some areas of government were reserved for the Parliament of the UK such as foreign affairs, international trade and defense. Speaking in October 1920, British Prime Minister Lloyd George explained the reasoning for retaining the defense functions: "The Irish temper is an uncertainty and dangerous forces like armies and navies are better under the control of the Imperial Parliament."

Northern Ireland would comprise the aforesaid six northeastern counties, while Southern Ireland would comprise the rest of the island. The Act was passed on 11 November and received royal assent in December 1920. It would come into force on 3 May 1921. Elections to the Northern and Southern parliaments were held on 24 May. Unionists won most seats in Northern Ireland. Its parliament first met on 7 June and formed its first devolved government, headed by Unionist Party leader James Craig. Republican and nationalist members refused to attend. King George V addressed the ceremonial opening of the Northern parliament on 22 June. Meanwhile, Sinn Féin won an overwhelming majority in the Southern Ireland election. They treated both as elections for Dáil Éireann, and its elected members gave allegiance to the Dáil and Irish Republic, thus rendering "Southern Ireland" dead in the water. The Southern parliament met only once and was attended by four unionists.

On 5 May 1921, the Ulster Unionist leader Sir James Craig met with the President of Sinn Féin, Éamon de Valera, in secret near Dublin. Each restated his position and nothing new was agreed upon and no arrangements were made to meet a second time. On 10 May De Valera told the Dáil that the meeting "... was of no significance". In June that year, shortly before the truce that ended the Anglo-Irish War, David Lloyd George invited the Irish President de Valera to talks in London on an equal footing with the new Prime Minister of Northern Ireland, James Craig, which de Valera attended. De Valera's policy in the ensuing negotiations was that the future of Ulster was an Irish-British matter to be resolved between two sovereign states, and that Craig should not attend. After the truce came into effect on 11 July, the USC was demobilised (July – November 1921). Speaking after the truce Lloyd George made it clear to de Valera, 'that the achievement of a republic through negotiation was impossible'.

On 20 July, Lloyd George further declared to de Valera that:

The form in which the settlement is to take effect will depend upon Ireland herself. It must allow for full recognition of the existing powers and privileges of the Parliament of Northern Ireland, which cannot be abrogated except by their own consent. For their part, the British Government entertain an earnest hope that the necessity of harmonious co-operation amongst Irishmen of all classes and creeds will be recognised throughout Ireland, and they will welcome the day when by those means unity is achieved. But no such common action can be secured by force.

In reply, de Valera wrote

We most earnestly desire to help in bringing about a lasting peace between the peoples of these two islands, but see no avenue by which it can be reached if you deny Ireland's essential unity and set aside the principle of national self-determination.

Speaking in the House of Commons on the day the Act passed, Joe Devlin (Nationalist Party) representing west Belfast, summed up the feelings of many Nationalists concerning partition and the setting up of a Northern Ireland Parliament while Ireland was in a deep state of unrest. Devlin stated:

"I know beforehand what is going to be done with us, and therefore it is well that we should make our preparations for that long fight which, I suppose, we will have to wage in order to be allowed even to live." He accused the government of "...not inserting a single clause...to safeguard the interests of our people. This is not a scattered minority...it is the story of weeping women, hungry children, hunted men, homeless in England, houseless in Ireland. If this is what we get when they have not their Parliament, what may we expect when they have that weapon, with wealth and power strongly entrenched? What will we get when they are armed with Britain's rifles, when they are clothed with the authority of government, when they have cast round them the Imperial garb, what mercy, what pity, much less justice or liberty, will be conceded to us then? That is what I have to say about the Ulster Parliament."

Ulster Unionist Party politician Charles Craig (the brother of Sir James Craig) made the feelings of many Unionists clear concerning the importance they placed on the passing of the Act and the establishment of a separate Parliament for Northern Ireland:

"The Bill gives us everything we fought for, everything we armed ourselves for, and to attain which we raised our Volunteers in 1913 and 1914...but we have many enemies in this country, and we feel that an Ulster without a Parliament of its own would not be in nearly as strong a position...where, above all, the paraphernalia of Government was already in existence...We should fear no one and would be in a position of absolute security."

In reference to the threat of Unionist violence and the achievement of a separate status of Ulster, Winston Churchill felt that "...if Ulster had confined herself simply to constitutional agitation, it is extremely improbable that she would have escaped inclusion in a Dublin Parliament." Churchill considered the negative effects that partition was having on public opinion: "Ulster divides British opinion at home and throughout the Empire. It consolidates American opinion against us...our Ulster case is not a good one."

== Anglo-Irish Treaty ==
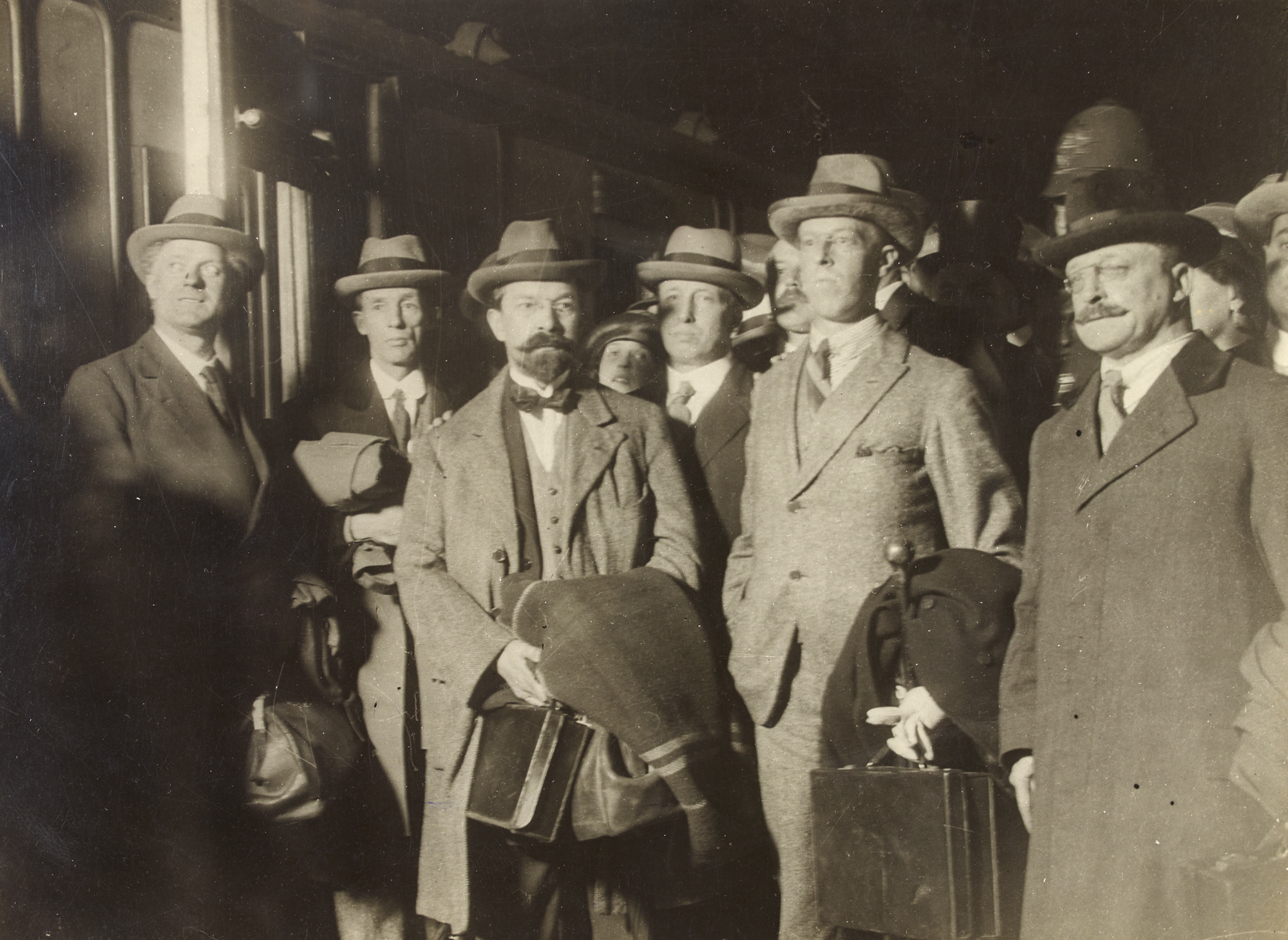
Members of the Irish negotiation committee returning to Ireland in December 1921

The Irish War of Independence led to the Anglo-Irish Treaty, between the British government and representatives of the Irish Republic. Negotiations between the two sides were carried on between October and December 1921. The British delegation consisted of experienced parliamentarians/debaters such as the British Prime Minister Lloyd George, Colonial Secretary Winston Churchill, the Leader of the House of Commons Austen Chamberlain, Lord Chancellor Lord Birkenhead and Secretary for War Laming Worthington-Evans - they had clear advantages over the Sinn Féin negotiators. While the President of the Irish Republic Éamon de Valera did not participate in the negotiations he did give the Irish delegation specific instructions to provide "the full text of the draft treaty about to be signed" and to await a reply before taking any further action. No messages or telegraphs were sent by the Irish delegation to Dublin prior to the signing of the Treaty. The Treaty was signed on 6 December 1921. Under its terms, the territory of Southern Ireland would leave the United Kingdom within one year and become a self-governing dominion called the Irish Free State. The Treaty was given legal effect in the United Kingdom through the Irish Free State Constitution Act 1922, and in Ireland by ratification by Dáil Éireann. Under the former Act, at 1 pm on 6 December 1922, King George V (at a meeting of his Privy Council at Buckingham Palace) signed a proclamation establishing the new Irish Free State.

Under the Treaty, Northern Ireland's parliament could vote to opt out of the Free State. Under Article 12 of the Treaty, Northern Ireland could exercise its opt-out by presenting an address to the King, requesting not to be part of the Irish Free State. Once the Treaty was ratified, the Houses of Parliament of Northern Ireland had one month (dubbed the Ulster month) to exercise this opt-out during which time the provisions of the Government of Ireland Act continued to apply in Northern Ireland. According to barrister and legal writer Austen Morgan, the wording of the Treaty allowed the impression to be given that the Irish Free State temporarily included the whole island of Ireland, but legally the terms of the Treaty applied only to the 26 counties, and the government of the Free State never had any powers—even in principle—in Northern Ireland. On 7 December 1922 the Parliament of Northern Ireland approved an address to George V, requesting that its territory not be included in the Irish Free State. This was presented to the king the following day and then entered into effect, in accordance with the provisions of Section 12 of the Irish Free State (Agreement) Act 1922. The Treaty also allowed for a re-drawing of the border by a Boundary Commission.

=== Unionist objections to the Treaty ===
Sir James Craig, the Prime Minister of Northern Ireland objected to aspects of the Anglo-Irish Treaty. In a letter to Austen Chamberlain dated 14 December 1921, he stated:

We protest against the declared intention of your government to place Northern Ireland automatically in the Irish Free State. Not only is this opposed to your pledge in our agreed statement of November 25th, but it is also antagonistic to the general principles of the Empire regarding her people's liberties. It is true that Ulster is given the right to contract out, but she can only do so after automatic inclusion in the Irish Free State. [...] We can only conjecture that it is a surrender to the claims of Sinn Fein that her delegates must be recognised as the representatives of the whole of Ireland, a claim which we cannot for a moment admit. [...] The principles of the 1920 Act have been completely violated, the Irish Free State being relieved of many of her responsibilities towards the Empire. [...] We are glad to think that our decision will obviate the necessity of mutilating the Union Jack.

With time it appears that Craigs attitude towards partition had softened. In 1938 he privately admitted that the partition of Ireland should not be permanent: "In this island we cannot live always separated from one another. We are too small to be apart or for the border to be there for all time. The change will not come in my time but it will come."

=== Nationalist objections to the Government of Ireland Act & the Anglo Irish Treaty ===
In March 1920 William Redmond a member of Parliament and combat veteran of World War I, addressed his fellow members of the British House of Commons concerning the Government of Ireland Act:

I was pleased to fight shoulder to shoulder, on the Somme and elsewhere, with my fellow-countrymen from the North of Ireland. We fraternised, and we thought that when we came home we would not bicker again, but that we would be happy in Ireland, with a Parliament for our own native country. We did not want two Irelands at the Front; it was one Ireland, whether we, came from the North or from the South...I feel in common with thousands of my countrymen in Ireland, that I and they have been cheated out of the fruits of our victory. We placed our trust in you and you have betrayed us.

On the night that the Government of Ireland Act of 1920 passed in the House of Commons (11 November 1920) the MP for North East Tyrone Thomas Harbison made his feelings clear on the division of Ulster and the partition of Ireland:

At the present moment we, the Nationalists of Ulster, hold five out of the nine County Councils of Ulster. Tyrone is a Nationalist County Council; so is Fermanagh, and so are Cavan, Monaghan and Donegal. Tyrone and Fermanagh have been won against a system of shameless jerrymandering. We won them in spite of that jerrymandering. We have fought for 35 years; and now, by this Bill, we are to be cut off from the rest of Ireland and thrown into eternal slavery by another system of jerrymandering. In this proposed Parliament in Belfast we, who represent nearly half a million of the population, will not have more than eight or nine seats out of 50 or 52. Harbison said that (due to Jerrymandering) County Tyrone Nationalists were "legally justified in using every form of resistance to prevent this Act from coming into operation" and that the Act represents "the dictates of a narrow-minded set of reactionaries in the North-East corner of Ulster, who will have us under their heel for all time."

Michael Collins (the Chairman of the Provisional Government of the Irish Free State) had negotiated the Treaty and had it approved by the cabinet, the Dáil (on 7 January 1922 by 64–57), and by the people in national elections. Regardless of this, it was unacceptable to Éamon de Valera, who led the Irish Civil War to stop it. Collins was primarily responsible for drafting the constitution of the new Irish Free State, based on a commitment to democracy and rule by the majority.

De Valera's minority refused to be bound by the result. Collins became the dominant figure in Irish politics, leaving de Valera on the outside. The main dispute centered on the proposed status as a dominion (as represented by the Oath of Allegiance and Fidelity) for Southern Ireland, rather than on the independence of an all-Ireland state. Otherwise uncompromising Republicans appeared to regard, a partition, at least for now, as inevitable. In August 1920, as President of Dáil, de Valera had declared in favour of "giving each county power to vote itself out of the Republic if it so wished". Conceding that "in the last analysis the test of nationality is the wish of the people", Sinn Féin Vice-president, Fr Michael O'Flanagan, had asked whether "we are going to compel Antrim and Down to love us by force"?

On 20 July 1921, the British Government provided Irish leadership with an offer which provided (amongst other items) for Dominion status for Ireland and the full recognition of the Government of Northern Ireland. Thomas Jones the long-time Deputy Secretary to the British Cabinet provided a transcript of the 10 August 1921 response from de Valera:

On the occasion of our last interview I gave it as my judgement that Dail Eireann could not and that the Irish people would not accept the proposals of your Government as set forth in the draft of July 20th which you had presented to me...To the extent that it implies a recognition of Ireland's separate nationhood and her right to self determination, we appreciate and accept it...Ireland's right to choose for herself the path she shall take to realise her own destiny must be accepted as indefeasible. It is a right that has been maintained through centuries of oppression and at the cost of unparalleled sacrifice and untold suffering, and it will not be surrendered.

Partition was a significant matter for Ulstermen like Seán MacEntee, who spoke strongly against partition or re-partition of any kind. The pro-Treaty side argued that the proposed Boundary Commission would give large swathes of Northern Ireland to the Free State, leaving the remaining territory too small to be viable. Shortly after the signing of the Anglo-Irish Treaty, the Irish Minister for Foreign Affairs Arthur Griffith spoke to his Under-Secretary (Robert Brennan) concerning the partition clause: "It does not mean partition, under clause twelve we'll get at least two of the six counties, Tyrone and Fermanagh and possibly other areas, such as South Armagh and South Down."

In February 1922 Collins met with the newly appointed Prime Minister for Northern Ireland James Craig. At that meeting Craig made it clear that "Unionists would never abandon places such as Derry City and Enniskillen; he stressed their historic and sentimental importance to Protestants and ignored their Catholic majorities." In April 1922 Collins told the IRA in County Tyrone that "Partition would never be recognized even if it might mean smashing the Treaty." (Collins was killed by anti-Treaty forces in August 1922). In October 1922, the Irish Free State government established the North-Eastern Boundary Bureau (NEBB) a government office which by 1925 had prepared 56 boxes of files to argue its case for areas of Northern Ireland to be transferred to the Free State. In the lead up to the 1925 Northern Ireland general election Craig called for the inclusion of the Ulster County of Donegal into the new Northern State and warned that the north could return to the troubles of 1920–22.

=== Document No. 2 ===
De Valera had drafted his own preferred text of the Anglo-Irish Treaty in December 1921, known as "Document No. 2" which was considered as a compromise solution during the Treaty debates. The document suggested that all of Ireland have an "External Association" but not full membership in the British Commonwealth. The document declared that the Irish parliament (Dáil Éireann) would not recognise the right of any part of Ireland to be excluded yet recognised the secession of Northern Ireland for the sake of peace. Document No. 2 was not adopted as an alternative to the Treaty. An "Addendum North East Ulster" indicates his acceptance of the 1920 partition for the time being, and of the rest of Treaty text as signed in regard to Northern Ireland:

That whilst refusing to admit the right of any part of Ireland to be excluded from the supreme authority of the Parliament of Ireland, or that the relations between the Parliament of Ireland and any subordinate legislature in Ireland can be a matter for Treaty with a Government outside Ireland, nevertheless, in sincere regard for internal peace, and to make manifest our desire not to bring force or coercion to bear upon any substantial part of the province of Ulster, whose inhabitants may now be unwilling to accept the national authority, we are prepared to grant to that portion of Ulster which is defined as Northern Ireland in the British Government of Ireland Act of 1920, privileges and safeguards not less substantial than those provided for in the 'Articles of Agreement for a Treaty' between Great Britain and Ireland signed in London on 6 December 1921.

=== Craig-Collins Pacts and debate on Ulster Month ===
In early 1922 the two leaders of Northern and Southern Ireland agreed on two pacts that were referred to as the Craig-Collins Pacts. Both Pacts were designed to bring peace to Northern Ireland and deal with the issue of partition. Both Pacts fell apart and it was the last time for over 40 years that the leaders of government in the north and south were to meet. Among other issues, the first pact (21 January 1922) called for the ending of the ongoing "Belfast Boycott" of northern goods by the south and the return of jobs to the thousands of Catholics that had been forcibly removed from Belfast's mills and shipyards. Collins proposed that a conference be held of all elected representatives in Ireland that would draft a constitution for a united Ireland which would keep the powers of Northern Ireland intact. When Craig met with Unionist leaders there was no discussion on the proposed conference. The second Pact consisted of ten Articles which called for an end to all IRA activity in Northern Ireland and the setting up of a special police force that would represent the two communities. Article VII called for meetings before the Northern Ireland Government exercised its option to opt out of the Anglo-Irish Treaty. The purpose of the meetings was to be "...whether means can be devised to secure the unity of Ireland or failing this whether agreement can be arrived at on the boundary question otherwise than by recourse to the Boundary Commission."

Under the treaty it was provided that Northern Ireland would have a month – the "Ulster Month" – during which its Houses of Parliament could opt out of the Irish Free State. The Treaty was ambiguous on whether the month should run from the date the Anglo-Irish Treaty was ratified (in March 1922 via the Irish Free State (Agreement) Act) or the date that the Constitution of the Irish Free State was approved and the Free State established (6 December 1922).

When the Irish Free State (Agreement) Bill was being debated on 21 March 1922, amendments were proposed which would have provided that the Ulster Month would run from the passing of the Irish Free State (Agreement) Act and not the Act that would establish the Irish Free State. Essentially, those who put down the amendments wished to bring forward the month during which Northern Ireland could exercise its right to opt out of the Irish Free State. They justified this view on the basis that if Northern Ireland could exercise its option to opt out at an earlier date, this would help to settle any state of anxiety or trouble on the new Irish border. Speaking in the House of Lords, the Marquess of Salisbury argued:

The disorder [in Northern Ireland] is extreme. Surely the Government will not refuse to make a concession which will do something... to mitigate the feeling of irritation which exists on the Ulster side of the border.... [U]pon the passage of the Bill into law Ulster will be, technically, part of the Free State. No doubt the Free State will not be allowed, under the provisions of the Act, to exercise authority in Ulster; but, technically, Ulster will be part of the Free State.... Nothing will do more to intensify the feeling in Ulster than that she should be placed, even temporarily, under the Free State which she abominates.

The British Government took the view that the Ulster Month should run from the date the Irish Free State was established and not beforehand, Viscount Peel for the Government remarking:

His Majesty's Government did not want to assume that it was certain that on the first opportunity Ulster would contract out. They did not wish to say that Ulster should have no opportunity of looking at entire Constitution of the Free State after it had been drawn up before she must decide whether she would or would not contract out.

Viscount Peel continued by saying the government desired that there should be no ambiguity and would to add a proviso to the Irish Free State (Agreement) Bill providing that the Ulster Month should run from the passing of the Act establishing the Irish Free State. He further noted that the Parliament of Southern Ireland had agreed with that interpretation, and that Arthur Griffith also wanted Northern Ireland to have a chance to see the Irish Free State Constitution before deciding.

Lord Birkenhead remarked in the Lords debate:

I should have thought, however strongly one may have embraced the cause of Ulster, that one would have resented it as an intolerable grievance if, before finally and irrevocably withdrawing from the Constitution, she was unable to see the Constitution from which she was withdrawing.

=== Northern Ireland opts out ===
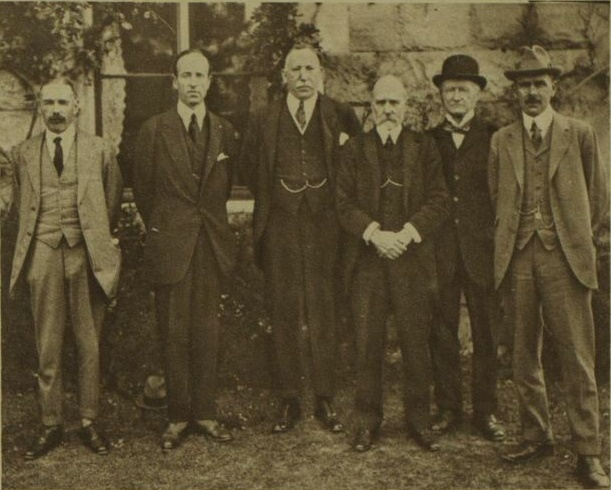
James Craig (centre) with members of the first government of Northern Ireland

The Treaty "went through the motions of including Northern Ireland within the Irish Free State while offering it the provision to opt out". It was certain that Northern Ireland would exercise its opt out. The Prime Minister of Northern Ireland, Sir James Craig, speaking in the House of Commons of Northern Ireland in October 1922, said that "when the 6th of December is passed the month begins in which we will have to make the choice either to vote out or remain within the Free State." He said it was important that that choice be made as soon as possible after 6 December 1922 "in order that it may not go forth to the world that we had the slightest hesitation." On 7 December 1922, the day after the establishment of the Irish Free State, the Parliament of Northern Ireland resolved to make the following address to the King so as to opt out of the Irish Free State:

MOST GRACIOUS SOVEREIGN, We, your Majesty's most dutiful and loyal subjects, the Senators and Commons of Northern Ireland in Parliament assembled, having learnt of the passing of the Irish Free State Constitution Act, 1922 [...] do, by this humble Address, pray your Majesty that the powers of the Parliament and Government of the Irish Free State shall no longer extend to Northern Ireland.

Discussion in the Parliament of the address was short. No division or vote was requested on the address, which was described as the Constitution Act and was then approved by the Senate of Northern Ireland. Craig left for London with the memorial embodying the address on the night boat that evening, 7 December 1922. King George V received it the following day.

If the Houses of Parliament of Northern Ireland had not made such a declaration, under Article 14 of the Treaty, Northern Ireland, its Parliament and government would have continued in being but the Oireachtas would have had jurisdiction to legislate for Northern Ireland in matters not delegated to Northern Ireland under the Government of Ireland Act. This never came to pass. On 13 December 1922, Craig addressed the Parliament of Northern Ireland, informing them that the King had accepted the Parliament's address and had informed the British and Free State governments.

=== Customs posts established ===
While the Irish Free State was established at the end of 1922, the Boundary Commission contemplated by the Treaty was not to meet until 1924. Things did not remain static during that gap. In April 1923, just four months after independence, the Irish Free State established customs barriers on the border. This was a significant step in consolidating the border. "While its final position was sidelined, its functional dimension was actually being underscored by the Free State with its imposition of a customs barrier".

== Boundary Commission ==
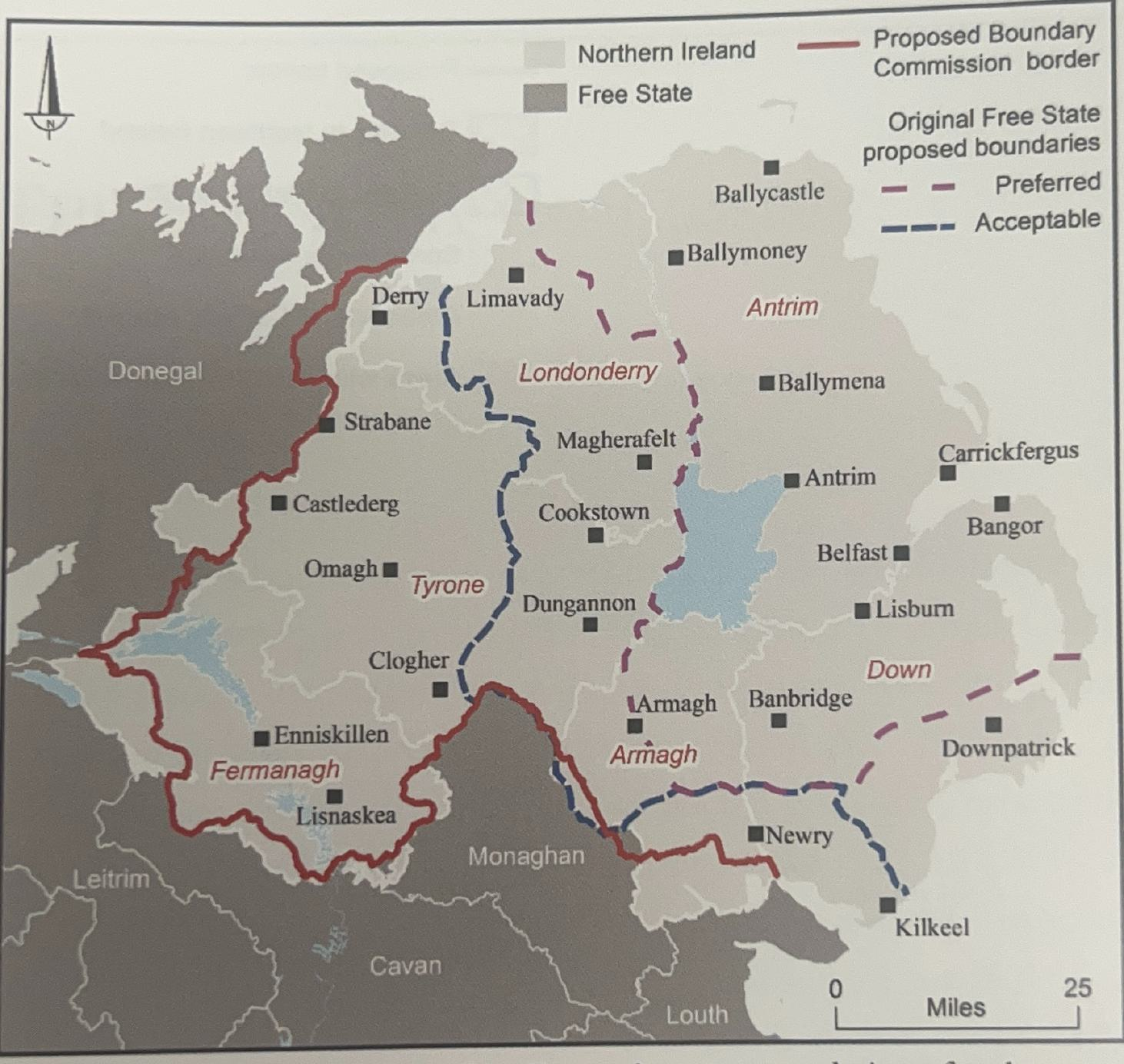
North East Boundary Bureau recommendations (May 1923)

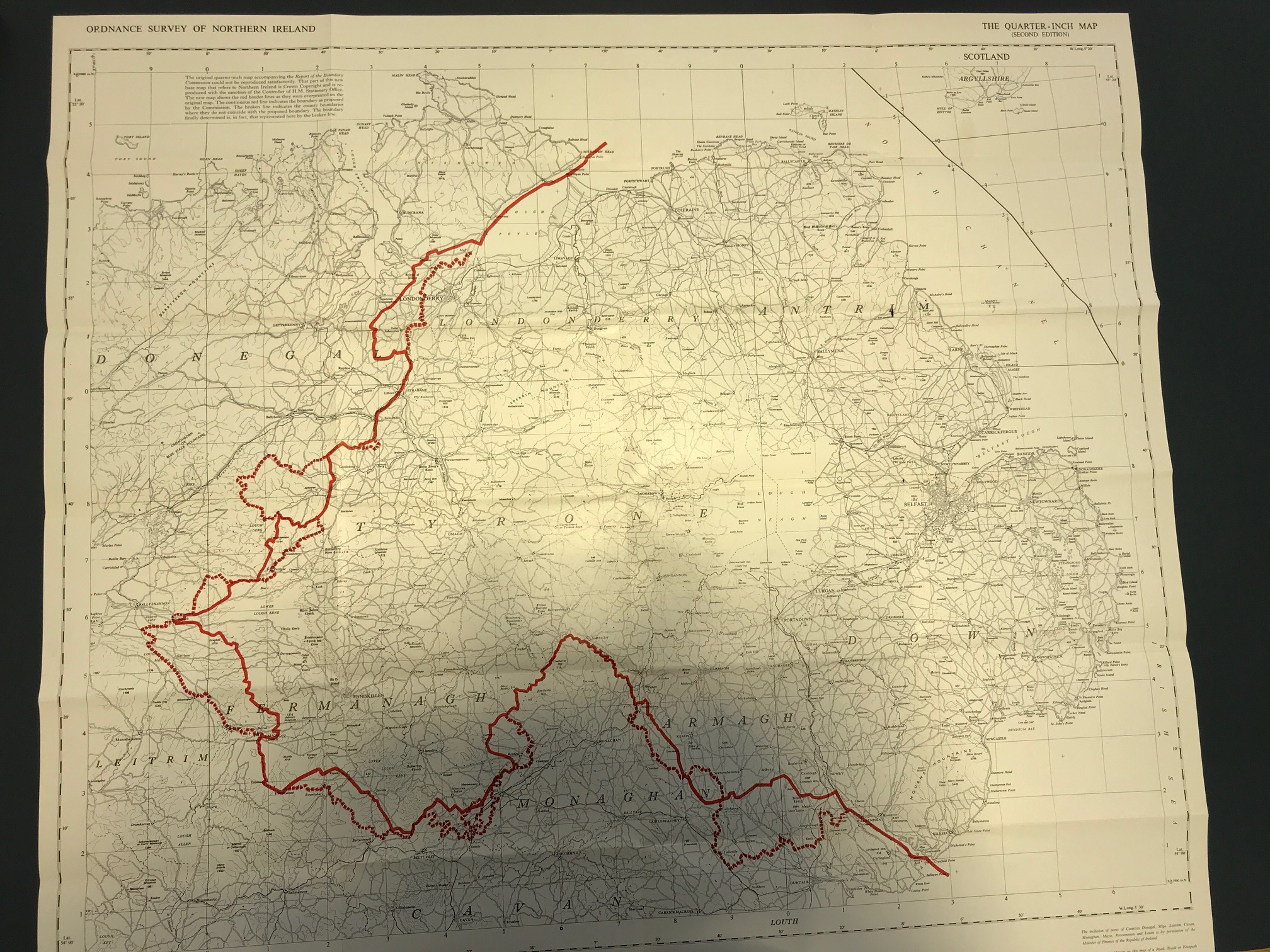
The Boundary Commission's proposed changes to the border

The Anglo-Irish Treaty (signed 6 December 1921) contained a provision (Article 12) that would establish a boundary commission, which would determine the border "...in accordance with the wishes of the inhabitants, so far as may be compatible with economic and geographic conditions...". In October 1922 the Irish Free State government set up the North East Boundary Bureau (directed by Tyrone native and Sinn Féin member Kevin O'Shiel) to prepare its case for the Boundary Commission. The Bureau conducted extensive work but the commission refused to consider its work, which amounted to 56 boxes of files. Most leaders in the Free State, both pro- and anti-Treaty, assumed that the commission would award largely nationalist areas such as County Fermanagh, County Tyrone, South Londonderry, South Armagh and South Down and the City of Derry to the Free State and that the remnant of Northern Ireland would not be economically viable and would eventually opt for union with the rest of the island. To many Republicans the Boundary Commission was the least objectionable part of the Treaty.

The terms of Article 12 were ambiguous – no timetable was established or method to determine "the wishes of the inhabitants". Article 12 did not specifically call for a plebiscite or specify a time for the convening of the commission (the commission did not meet until November 1924). The northern anti partitionist (and future Member of Parliament) Cahir Healy worked with the North East Boundary Bureau to develop cases for the exclusion of Nationalist areas from Northern Ireland. Healy urged the Dublin government to insist on a plebiscite in the counties of Fermanagh and Tyrone. In a 14 October 1921 conference on Ireland Michael Collins addressed Austen Chamberlain: "You and Northern Ireland are faced with the coercion of one third of its area. Tyrone and Fermanagh, more than half Armagh, a great deal of Derry and a strip of Antrim will go...As to the use of force: if our people are attacked they will defend themselves..."

By December 1924 the chairman of the commission (Richard Feetham) had firmly ruled out the use of plebiscites and made clear that any changes to the border must leave the northern state fully viable. In Southern Ireland the new Parliament fiercely debated the terms of the Treaty yet devoted a very small amount of time on the issue of partition – just nine out of 338 transcript pages. The commission's final report recommended only minor transfers of territory, and in both directions.

=== Make up of the commission ===
In a 1923 conversation with the 1st Prime Minister of Northern Ireland James Craig, British Prime Minister Stanley Baldwin commented on the future makeup of the commission: "If the Commission should give away counties, then of course Ulster couldn't accept it and we should back her. But the Government will nominate a proper representative for Northern Ireland and we hope that he and Feetham will do what is right."

The commission consisted of only three members - Justice Richard Feetham, who represented the British government. Feetham was a judge and graduate of Oxford. In 1923 Feetham was the legal advisor to the High Commissioner for South Africa.

Eoin MacNeill, the Irish governments Minister for Education, represented the Irish Government. In 1913 MacNeill established the Irish Volunteers and in 1916 issued countermanding orders instructing the Volunteers not to take part in the Easter Rising which greatly limited the numbers that turned out for the rising. On the day before his execution, the Rising leader Tom Clarke warned his wife about MacNeill: "I want you to see to it that our people know of his treachery to us. He must never be allowed back into the national life of this country, for so sure as he is, so sure he will act treacherously in a crisis. He is a weak man, but I know every effort will be made to whitewash him."

Joseph R. Fisher was appointed by the British Government to represent the Northern Ireland Government (after the Northern Government refused to name a member). The Northern government declined to name a representative to the Commission as it did not consider itself bound by the Anglo-Irish Treaty, which it had never assented to. It has been argued that the selection of Fisher ensured that only minimal (if any) changes would occur to the existing border. Although all members had an obligation to preserve secrecy concerning the work of the Commission, Fisher was said to have provided regular reports to the Unionist Party while the Commission was still sitting, specifically to the Chairman of the Ulster Unionist Party at Westminster Sir David Reid. Reid and Feetham had been contemporaries while attending New College, Oxford.

While the Boundary Commission was meeting, in September 1924 Winston Churchill made a speech (while out of political office) in which he made his feelings clear on the upcoming partition of Ireland: "On the one side will be Catholics, tending more and more to Republicanism; on the other Protestants, holding firmly to the British Empire and the Union Jack...No result could be more disastrous to Irish national aspirations..."

A small team of five assisted the commission in its work. While Feetham was said to have kept his government contacts well informed on the commission's work, MacNeill consulted with no one. With the leak of the Boundary Commission report (7 November 1925), MacNeill resigned from both the commission and the Free State Government. As he departed the Free State Government admitted that MacNeill "wasn't the most suitable person to be a commissioner." The source of the leaked report was generally assumed to be made by Fisher. Although 20 copies of the Boundary Commission report were filed at the British Cabinet Office, all other copies were destroyed. The commission's report was not published in full until 1969.

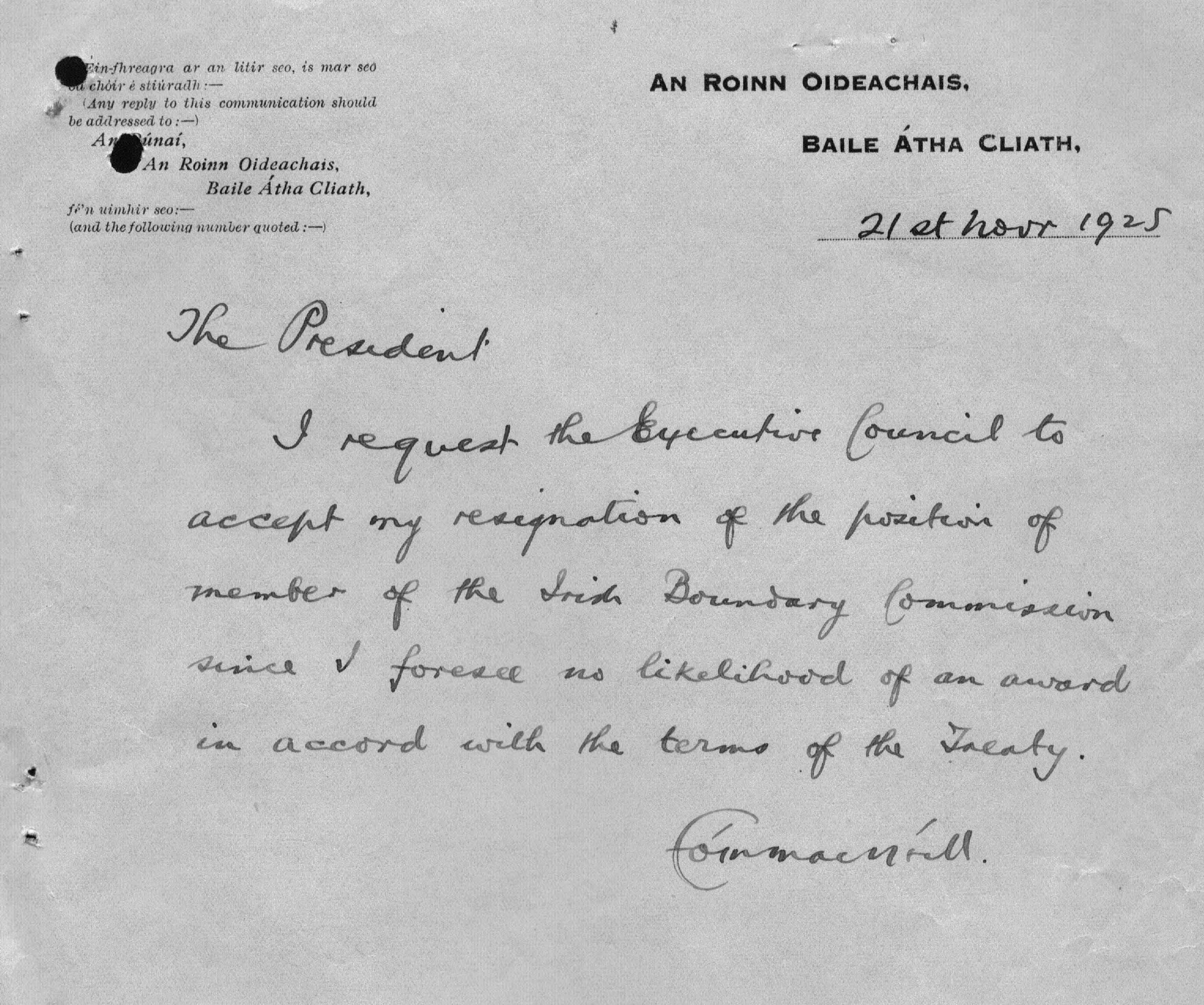
Mac Neill resignation note to the President of the Executive Council W. T. Cosgrave

=== War debt cancellation and final agreement ===
The Irish Free State, Northern Ireland and UK governments agreed to suppress the report and accept the status quo, while the UK government agreed that the Free State would no longer have to pay its share of the UK's national debt (the British claim was £157 million). The Chancellor of the Exchequer Winston Churchill was quoted on the terms of the cancellation of the Irish war debt: "I made a substantial modification of the financial provisions." Éamon de Valera commented on the cancellation of the southern governments debt (referred to as the war debt) to the British: the Free State "sold Ulster natives for four pound a head, to clear a debt we did not owe."

The final agreement between the Irish Free State, Northern Ireland, and the United Kingdom (the inter-governmental agreement) of 3 December 1925 was published later that day by Prime Minister Baldwin. The agreement was enacted by the "Ireland (Confirmation of Agreement) Act 1925" and was passed unanimously by the British parliament on 8–9 December. The Dáil voted to approve the agreement, by a supplementary act, on 10 December 1925 by a vote of 71 to 20. With a separate agreement concluded by the three governments, the publication of Boundary Commission report became an irrelevance. Commission member Fisher stated to the Unionist leader Edward Carson that no area of importance had been ceded to the Irish Government: “If anybody had suggested twelve months ago that we could have kept so much I would have laughed at him”. The President of the Executive Council of the Irish Free State W. T. Cosgrave informed the Irish Parliament (the Dail) that "...the only security for the Catholic minority in Northern Ireland now depended on the goodwill of their neighbours."

== After partition ==
Both governments agreed to the disbandment of the Council of Ireland. The leaders of the two parts of Ireland did not meet again until 1965. Since partition, Irish republicans and nationalists have sought to end partition, while Ulster loyalists and unionists have sought to maintain it. The pro-Treaty Cumann na nGaedheal government of the Free State hoped the Boundary Commission would make Northern Ireland too small to be viable. It focused on the need to build a strong state and accommodate Northern unionists. The anti-Treaty Fianna Fáil had Irish unification as one of its core policies and sought to rewrite the Free State's constitution. Sinn Féin rejected the legitimacy of the Free State's institutions altogether because it implied accepting partition. In Northern Ireland, the Nationalist Party was the main political party in opposition to the Unionist governments and partition. Other early anti-partition groups included the National League of the North (formed in 1928), the Northern Council for Unity (formed in 1937) and the Irish Anti-Partition League (formed in 1945). Until 1969 a system for elections known as plural voting was in place in Northern Ireland. Plural voting allowed one person to vote multiple times in an election. Only ratepayers (or taxpayers) could vote in local elections and the House of Commons of Northern Ireland. Owners of businesses were often able to cast more than one vote while non ratepayers did not have the right to vote. In Southern Ireland plural voting for Dáil Éireann elections was abolished by the Electoral Act 1923.

=== Constitution of Ireland 1937 ===
De Valera came to power in Dublin in 1932, and drafted a new Constitution of Ireland which in 1937 was adopted by plebiscite in the Irish Free State. Its articles 2 and 3 defined the 'national territory' as: "the whole island of Ireland, its islands and the territorial seas". The state was named 'Ireland' (in English) and 'Éire' (in Irish); a United Kingdom Act of 1938 described the state as "Eire". The irredentist texts in Articles 2 and 3 were deleted by the Nineteenth Amendment in 1998, as part of the Belfast Agreement.

=== Sabotage Campaign of 1939–1940 ===
In January 1939 the IRA's Army Council informed the British government that they were going to war with Britain with the goal of ending partition. The "Sabotage" or S-Plan took place only in England from January 1939 until May 1940. During this campaign approximately 300 bombings/acts of sabotage took place resulting in 10 deaths, 96 injuries and significant damage to infrastructure. In response the British government enacted the Prevention of Violence Act 1939, which permitted deportation of persons thought to be associated with the IRA. The Irish government enacted the Offences against the State Acts 1939–1998 with almost one thousand IRA members being imprisoned or interned without trial.

=== British offer of unity in 1940 ===
During the Second World War, after the Fall of France, Britain made a qualified offer of Irish unity in June 1940, without reference to those living in Northern Ireland. On their rejection, neither the London nor Dublin governments publicised the matter. Ireland would have allowed British ships to use selected ports for counter submarine operations, arresting Germans and Italians, setting up a joint defence council and allowing overflights. In return, arms would have been provided to Ireland and British forces would cooperate on a German invasion. London would have declared that it accepted 'the principle of a United Ireland' in the form of an undertaking 'that the Union is to become at an early date an accomplished fact from which there shall be no turning back.' Clause ii of the offer promised a joint body to work out the practical and constitutional details, 'the purpose of the work being to establish at as early a date as possible the whole machinery of government of the Union'. On the day after the Japanese attacks on Pearl Harbor (8 December 1941) Churchill sent a telegram to the Irish Prime Minister in which he obliquely offered Irish unity – "Now is your chance. Now or never! A nation once again! I will meet you wherever you wish." No meeting took place between the two prime ministers and there is no record of a response from de Valera. The proposals were first published in 1970 in a biography of de Valera.

=== 1942–1973 ===
In 1942–1944 the IRA carried out a series of attacks on security forces in Northern Ireland known as the Northern Campaign. The Irish government's internment of Irish Republicans in Curragh Camp greatly reduced the effectiveness of the IRA's campaign.

In May 1949 the Taoiseach John A. Costello introduced a motion in the Dáil strongly against the terms of the UK's Ireland Act 1949 that confirmed partition for as long as a majority of the electorate in Northern Ireland wanted it, styled in Dublin as the "Unionist Veto".

Congressman John E. Fogarty was the main mover of the Fogarty Resolution on 29 March 1950. This proposed suspending Marshall Plan Foreign Aid to the UK, as Northern Ireland was costing Britain $150,000,000 annually, and therefore American financial support for Britain was prolonging the partition of Ireland. Whenever partition was ended, Marshall Aid would restart. On 27 September 1951, Fogarty's resolution was defeated in Congress by 206 votes to 139, with 83 abstaining – a factor that swung some votes against his motion was that Ireland had remained neutral during World War II.

From 1956 to 1962, the IRA carried out a limited guerrilla campaign in border areas of Northern Ireland, called the Border Campaign. It aimed to destabilise Northern Ireland and bring about an end to partition, but ended in failure.

In 1965, Taoiseach Seán Lemass met Northern Ireland's Prime Minister Terence O'Neill. It was the first meeting between the two heads of government since partition.

Both the Republic and the UK joined the European Economic Community in 1973.

=== The Troubles and Good Friday Agreement ===
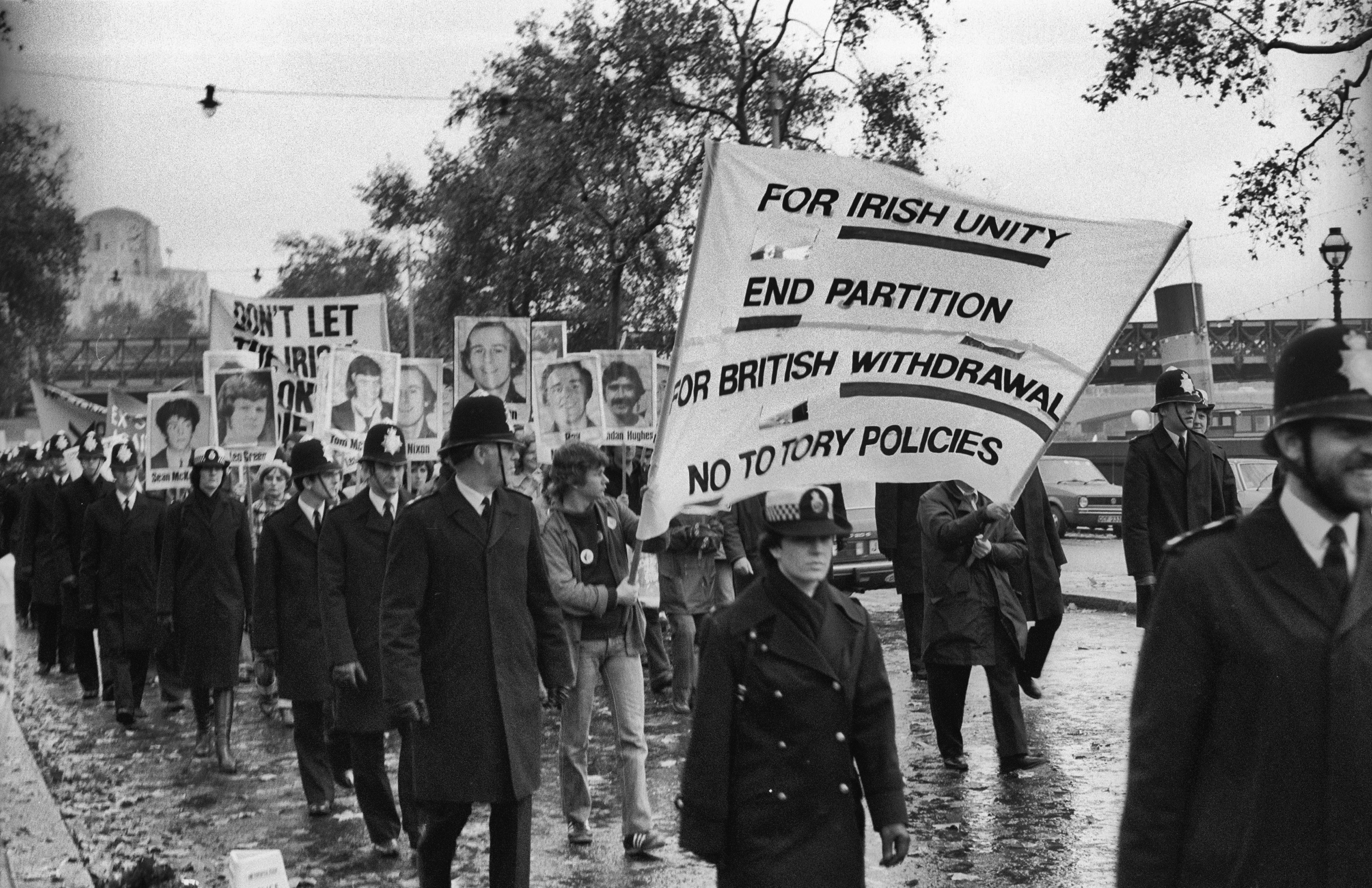
A republican anti-partition march in London, 1980s

The Unionist governments of Northern Ireland were accused of discrimination in jobs, housing and policing against the Irish nationalist and Catholic minority. In response, a non-violent campaign to end discrimination began in the late 1960s. This civil rights campaign was opposed violently by loyalists and hard-line unionist parties, who accused it of being a republican front to bring about a united Ireland. This unrest led to the August 1969 riots and the deployment of British troops, beginning a thirty-year conflict known as the Troubles (1969–98), involving republican and loyalist paramilitaries. In 1973 a 'border poll' referendum was held in Northern Ireland on whether it should remain part of the UK or join a united Ireland. Irish nationalists boycotted the referendum and only 57% of the electorate voted, resulting in an overwhelming majority for remaining in the UK.

The Northern Ireland peace process began in 1993, leading to the Good Friday Agreement in 1998. It was ratified by two referendums in both parts of Ireland, including an acceptance that a united Ireland would only be achieved by peaceful means. The remaining provisions of the Government of Ireland Act 1920 were repealed and replaced in the UK by the Northern Ireland Act 1998 as a result of the Agreement. The Irish Free State (Consequential Provisions) Act 1922 had already amended the 1920 Act so that it would only apply to Northern Ireland. It was finally repealed in the Republic by the Statute Law Revision Act 2007. In the Republic, a referendum authorised an amendment to the Constitution of Ireland to remove the assertion that the national territory is the whole island of Ireland and replace it with an aspiration to achieve unity by consent.

In its 2017 white paper on Brexit, the British government reiterated its commitment to the Agreement. On Northern Ireland's status, it said that the government's "clearly-stated preference is to retain Northern Ireland's current constitutional position: as part of the UK, but with strong links to Ireland".

While not explicitly mentioned in the 1998 Good Friday Agreement, factors such as the Common Travel Area understanding between the UK and the Republic of Ireland, (Note: The Common Travel Area is underpinned by a joint "Memorandum of Understanding", not a formal agreement or treaty. See that article for details.) the participation of both states at that time in an increasingly integrated European Union and the demilitarisation of the boundary region, resulted in the virtual disappearance of the border as a physical entity.

=== Partition and sport ===
Following partition, most sporting bodies continued on an all-Ireland basis. The main exception was association football (soccer), as separate organising bodies were formed in Northern Ireland (Irish Football Association) and the Republic of Ireland (Football Association of Ireland). At the Olympics, a person from Northern Ireland can choose to represent either the Republic of Ireland team (which competes as "Ireland") or United Kingdom team (which competes as "Great Britain").

== See also ==
- Irish issue in British politics – Consequences for government of the UK
  - The Irish question – British debate over calls for Irish independence
- Partitionism – View of Ireland as having two distinct parts
- Repartition of Ireland – Hypothetical redrawn border between the Republic of Ireland and Northern Ireland
- Republic of Ireland–United Kingdom border
- United Ireland – Proposition that Ireland be a single state
