= John H. Stubbs =

American architectural preservationist and academic

John Howell Stubbs is an American architectural preservationist, professor, and author. He is Emeritus Senior Professor of Practice at the Tulane University School of Architecture, where he directed the Master of Preservation Studies program from 2011 to 2019. Stubbs previously served as vice president for Field Projects at the World Monuments Fund (WMF) from 1990 to 2011 and has worked internationally on major heritage conservation projects. While at WMF, he also served as Adjunct Associate Professor of Preservation in the Graduate School of Architecture, Planning and Preservation at Columbia University.

== Early life and education ==
Stubbs was born in Louisiana. He received a Bachelor of Science in Construction Technology and Management, with a minor in architectural history, from Louisiana State University in 1972. He completed a Master of Science in Historic Preservation at Columbia University in 1974, with a thesis on conservation at the Roman site of Cosa in Italy. In 1977, he undertook post-graduate training as a UNESCO Fellow at the International Centre for the Study of the Preservation and Restoration of Cultural Property (ICCROM) in Rome.

== Career ==
=== Louisiana State University ===
From 1974 to 1977, Stubbs taught at the Louisiana State University School of Architecture, where he developed courses in preservation theory and restoration studios. He was named Outstanding Teacher of the Year in 1975.

=== National Park Service ===
Stubbs worked as a historical architect in the Technical Preservation Services Division of the U.S. National Park Service from 1977 to 1979, assisting with federal tax incentive programs for historic rehabilitation and leading technical workshops nationwide.

=== Beyer Blinder Belle ===
Between 1979 and 1990, Stubbs served as Associate and assistant director of Restoration at Beyer Blinder Belle in New York City. His work included projects at the New York Yacht Club, Alice Austen House, Grand Central Terminal, and Ellis Island, for which he coordinated the 11-volume Historic Structures Report.

=== World Monuments Fund ===
Stubbs served as vice president for Programs and Field Projects at the World Monuments Fund from 1990 to 2011, overseeing architectural conservation projects in more than 90 countries. He was a co-creator and initial principal manager of the World Monuments Watch, launched in 1995 to advocate for endangered heritage sites worldwide.

=== Columbia University ===
From 1993 to 2006, Stubbs was Adjunct Associate Professor of Preservation at Columbia University's Graduate School of Architecture, Planning and Preservation, teaching preservation theory and international conservation practice.

=== Tulane University ===
In 2011, Stubbs joined the Tulane University School of Architecture as Senior Professor of Practice, holding the Favrot and Christovich Professorships. He directed the Master of Preservation Studies program from 2011 to 2019 and retired in 2021 as emeritus Senior Professor of Practice.

== Research ==
Stubbs's scholarly work centers on comparative international architectural conservation, examining how preservation theory, policy, and practice vary across regions and evolve over time. His research addresses the development of conservation values, the role of cultural tourism, and the relationship between conservation, sustainability, and social stability. He has conducted field-based research at sites including Angkor in Cambodia, Pompeii in Italy, and historic religious architecture in Central and Eastern Europe.

He is the principal author of a multi-volume series on international conservation practice. Time Honored: A Global View of Architectural Conservation (2009) has been described as a comprehensive survey of preservation theory and practice worldwide, combining philosophical foundations with comparative policy analysis and case studies. Architectural Conservation in Europe and the Americas (2011, with Emily G. Makaš) was described in reviews as “an astonishing feat of research, compilation and synthesis.” Architectural Conservation in Asia (2016, with Robert G. Thomson) has been recognized as the first systematic survey of heritage practice across Asia. The fourth volume, Architectural Conservation in Australia, New Zealand and the Pacific Islands (2023, with William Chapman, Julia Gatley, and Ross King), extends this global comparative framework to Oceania.

== Publications ==
=== Books ===
- Time Honored: A Global View of Architectural Conservation; Parameters, Theory and Evolution of an Ethos (John Wiley & Sons, 2009)
- Architectural Conservation in Europe and the Americas: National Experiences and Practice (with Emily G. Makaš, John Wiley & Sons, 2011)
- Architectural Conservation in Asia: National Experiences and Practice (with Robert G. Thomson, Routledge, 2016)
- Architectural Conservation in Australia, New Zealand and the Pacific Islands: National Experiences and Practice (with William Chapman, Julia Gatley, and Ross King, Routledge, 2023)

=== Selected articles and chapters ===
- “Conserving Classical Architecture,” in Oxford Companion to Classical Archaeology (2014)
- “Choices in Architectural Heritage Conservation,” in Handbook on the Economics of Cultural Heritage (2013)
- “Learning from Preah Khan: Fifteen Years Work in Architectural Conservation at Angkor,” ICON (2006)
- “Water at Angkor—More to Wonder About,” Orientations (1998)
- “Protection and Preservation of Excavated Structures,” in Conservation on Archaeological Excavations (ICCROM, 1984)

Stubbs has also edited and contributed to technical reports, including the Preah Khan Conservation Project volumes (1991–1995), and has written on conservation for UNESCO and ICOMOS.
