= Stubbs =

Stubbs may refer to:

== Places ==
=== United States ===
- Stubbs, California, former name of Clearlake Oaks, California, a census-designated place
- Stubbs, Missouri, an unincorporated community
- Stubbs, Texas, an unincorporated community
- Stubbs, Wisconsin, a town
- Stubb's, a live music venue in Austin, Texas, named for Christopher B. "Stubb" Stubblefield

=== Elsewhere ===
- Stubbs, Saint Vincent and the Grenadines, a town in Saint Vincent

== Other uses ==
- Stubbs (cat), a cat who was the "mayor" of Talkeetna, Alaska, from 1997–2017
- The Stubbs, an American partisan militia from 1855 to 1861
- Stubbs (surname)
- Stubbs, the main character in the video game Stubbs the Zombie in "Rebel Without a Pulse"
- Stubb's Bar-B-Q, an American restaurant and brand of barbeque sauces

== See also ==
- Stub (disambiguation) (includes Stub and Stubb)
