= Stubble =

Stubble may mean:

- Stubble (hair), short stumps of hair that grow back on a man's face after shaving
  - Designer stubble, type of shaving stubble that became popular in the 1980s.
- Crop stubble, the short stalks left in a field after crops have been harvested
