= John O. Stubbs =

Canadian academic

John O. Stubbs is a Canadian academic. He was president of Trent University and Simon Fraser University.

Stubbs began his career as a historian and political scientist, specializing in the history of 20th century British politics and media. He distinguished himself as a teacher and administrator at the University of Waterloo, serving in various positions including associate dean of arts. Stubbs was appointed president of Trent University in 1987, a post that he held until 1993, when he was appointed for a five-year term as president of Simon Fraser University in British Columbia. His term was renewed in April 1997.

In 1997, he was forced to resign for his mishandling of a controversial sexual harassment case. Since then he has been a member of Simon Fraser's history department. In 1998, he was appointed a board member of the Canada Millennium Scholarship Foundation.

== Education ==
1. B.A. in modern history, University of Toronto, 1966; M.Sc. in international history, the London School of Economics, 1967;
2. D.Phil., Oxford University, 1973.
3. Lecturer, Trent University, 1967–1969.
4. Professor, University of Waterloo, 1973–1986.
5. Visiting lecturer (1979), visiting fellow (1986), St. Catherine's (Oxford).

== See also ==
- List of University of Waterloo people

== Sources ==
- Ian Mulgrew, "President’s role in sex harassment case scars his career", Vancouver Province, 19 July 1997, B3
- "U of G's Len Conolly new Trent president", Kitchener-Waterloo Record, 9 July 1993, B4
- Robert Matas, "Stubbs resigns post as SFU president", The Globe and Mail, 13 December 1997, A9
- Sarah Schmidt, "Scholarship fund failed, report says: Chretien legacy project", National Post, 6 November 2003, A4.
- http://www.sfu.ca/history/stubbs.htm

"SFU President appointed to second five year term," SFU News, April 3, 1997, Vol 8 No 7, https://www.sfu.ca/archive-sfunews/sfnews/1997/April3/president.html
