= Parliament of Southern Ireland =

Home rule legislature established by the UK Government during the Anglo-Irish War

Type
- Type: Bicameral
- Houses: Senate, House of Commons

History
- Established: 1921
- Disbanded: 27 May 1922
- Preceded by: Parliament of the United Kingdom
- Succeeded by: Provisional Parliament

Leadership
- Lord Chancellor of Ireland: Sir John Ross
- Speaker of the House of Commons: none (Gerald Fitzgibbon acting chairman)
- Seats: 64 Senators; 128 members of parliament (MPs)

Elections
- House of Commons voting system: STV
- Last House of Commons election: 1921 Irish elections (first & last)

Footnotes
- See also: Parliament of Northern Ireland

The Parliament of Southern Ireland was the parliament for Southern Ireland, one of two Home Rule jurisdictions in Ireland created in British law under the Government of Ireland Act 1920 during the Irish War of Independence. Whereas the other jurisdiction, Northern Ireland, came fully into operation, the institutions of Southern Ireland were never effective. The parliament was bicameral, consisting of a House of Commons (the lower house) with 128 seats and a Senate (the upper house) with 64 seats. The parliament had two brief poorly attended meetings in June and July 1921 and transacted no business before adjourning sine die. It was formally dissolved on 27 May 1922.

== Background ==
Under the Acts of Union 1800 the separate Kingdoms of Ireland and Great Britain were merged on 1 January 1801, to form the United Kingdom of Great Britain and Ireland. Throughout the 19th century Irish opposition to the Union was strong, occasionally erupting in violent insurrection.

In the 1870s the Home Rule League under Isaac Butt sought to achieve a modest form of self-government, known as Home Rule. This was considered more acceptable by British parliamentarians as Ireland would still remain part of the United Kingdom but would have limited self-government. The cause was then pursued by Charles Stewart Parnell and two attempts were made by Liberal ministries under British prime minister William Ewart Gladstone to enact home rule bills, accompanied by a revival of Ulster's Orange Order to resist any form of Home Rule. The First Home Rule Bill was defeated in the Commons by 30 votes; the second Second Home Rule Bill was passed, but then defeated in the Lords.

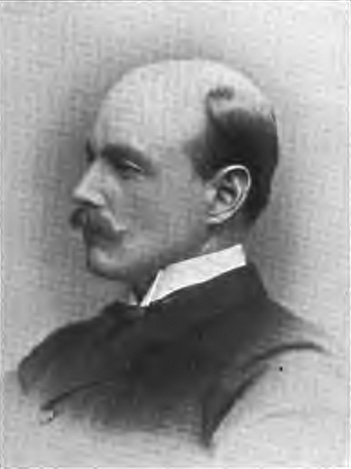
Ulster Unionist Party leader Walter Long who proposed the creation of two Irish home rule entities.

On 11 April 1912, the Prime Minister, H. H. Asquith, introduced the Third Home Rule Bill which allowed for more autonomy than its two predecessors had. It was defeated twice, but after its defeat for the third time in the Lords the Government used the provisions of the Parliament Act 1911 to override the Lords and send it for Royal Assent, which was received and the bill placed on the statute books on 18 September 1914. However, with the outbreak of the First World War, it was decided that the bill's implementation should be suspended, leading to the passing of the Suspensory Act 1914, which was presented for Royal Assent simultaneously with both the Home Rule Bill and the Welsh Church Act 1914, and ensured that Home Rule would be postponed for the duration of the conflict and would not come into operation until the end of the war. Initially the suspension was not considered an issue by Nationalists, who believed a form of independent self-government had finally been granted. Moreover, like almost everyone else in Europe at that time, Irish nationalists expected the war to be a short one.

Two attempts were made by the Asquith coalition ministry and the Lloyd George ministry to implement the Government of Ireland Act 1914 during the war, first in May 1916, which failed to reach agreement with Unionist Ulster, then again in 1917 with the calling of the Irish Convention chaired by Horace Plunkett. It consisted of Nationalist and Unionist representatives who, by April 1918, only succeeded in agreeing on a report with an 'understanding' of recommendations for the establishment of self-government. Starting in September 1919, with the Government, now led by David Lloyd George, committed under all circumstances to implementing Home Rule, the British cabinet's Committee for Ireland, under the chairmanship of former Ulster Unionist Party leader Walter Long, pushed for a radical new idea. Long proposed the creation of two Irish home rule jurisdictions, Northern Ireland and Southern Ireland, each with unicameral parliaments. An amendment to the bill in the House of Lords submitted by Lord Oranmore and Browne added a Senate for Southern Ireland, intended to bolster representation of the southern Unionist and Protestant minorities. The government opposed this on the grounds that it would weaken the function of the inter-parliament Council of Ireland, but it was passed, as was an amendment adding a Senate of Northern Ireland.

After the 1918 general election, those elected as MPs for Sinn Féin met in Dublin in 1919 and established Dáil Éireann as an abstentionist parliament and declared independence for the Irish Republic.

== House of Commons ==
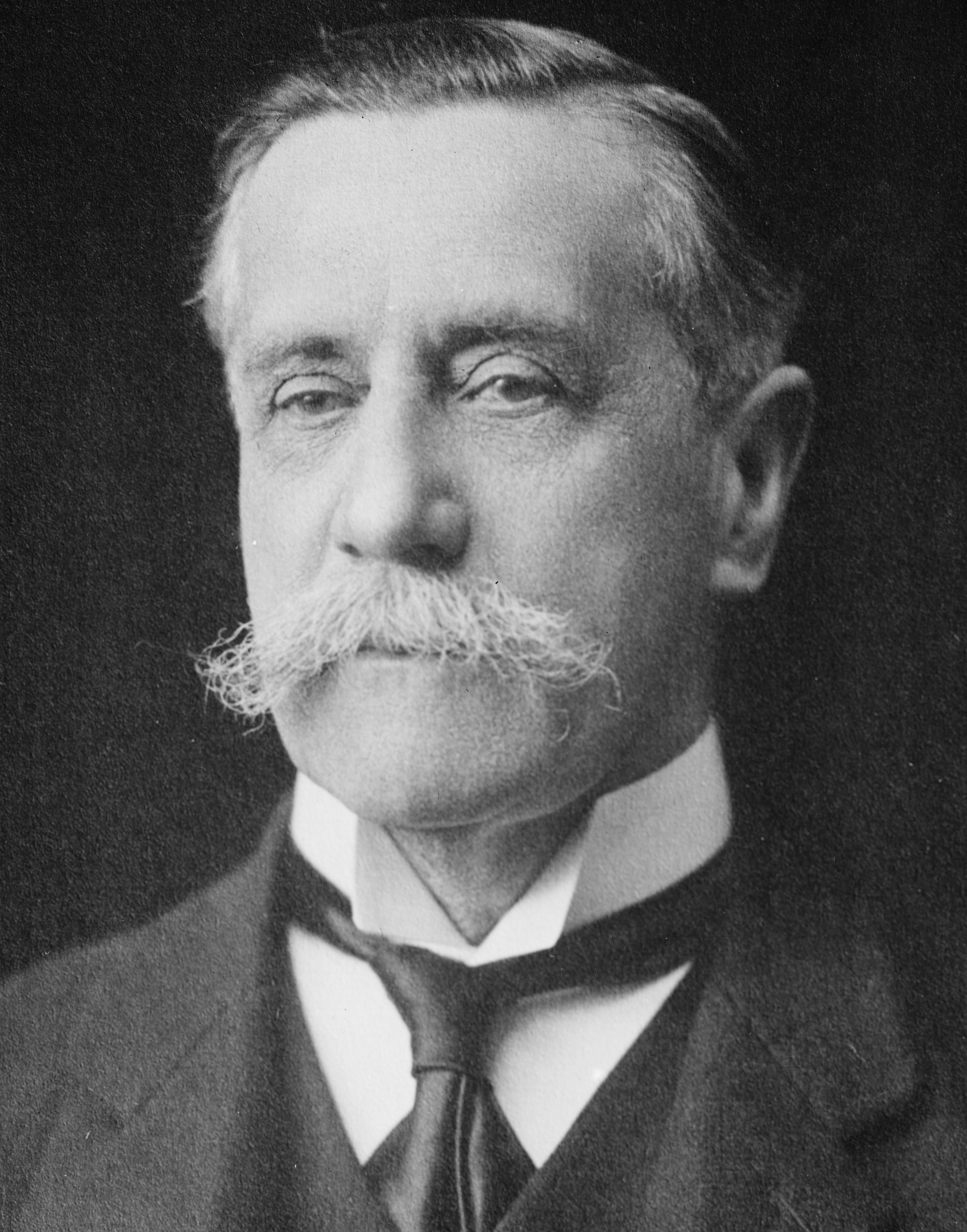
Viscount FitzAlan of Derwent, the last Lord Lieutenant of Ireland, who formally opened the Parliament.

The House of Commons consisted of 128 members who were styled as members of parliament with a presiding officer known as the Speaker of the House of Commons. The basic features of the House were modelled on those of the House of Commons of the United Kingdom. The franchise was the same as for Westminster elections under the Representation of the People Act 1918: men over 21 and women over 30. The voting method for elections to the Commons was the single transferable vote with the act prescribing 16 members being elected from multi-member borough constituencies, 104 from multi-member county constituencies and 8 being elected from graduates of Irish Universities. The borough and county constituencies replaced those used for Westminster elections with new multi-member ones. There were two four-seat university constituencies, for Dublin University and the National University.

=== Election ===
On 13 May 1921, nominations closed for the elections to the House of Commons of Southern Ireland. Unlike the simultaneous election in Northern Ireland, no contests occurred and all 128 MPs were returned unopposed, with Unionists winning the four seats for graduates of Dublin University and Sinn Féin winning the other 124 seats. Dáil Éireann chose to regard that election as elections to the Second Dáil. The 124 Sinn Féin candidates elected, plus the six Sinn Féin members elected to the House of Commons of Northern Ireland elected at the same time (five of whom also had seats in Southern Ireland), assembled as the Second Dáil.

1921 Southern Ireland general election
Party	Leader	No. of seats	% of seats
Sinn Féin	Éamon de Valera	124 (unopposed)	96.9
Independent Unionist		4 (unopposed)	3.1
Totals		128	100

== Senate ==
The Senate of Southern Ireland was the upper house of the Parliament. Whereas Sinn Féin took part in elections to the Commons, they boycotted the Senate completely as being undemocratic and weighted in favour of the Protestant Ascendancy.

=== Composition ===
The 1920 act provided for a Senate of 64 members. The composition was specified in the Second Schedule, and the mode and time of selection in the Fourth Schedule. These stipulated:

- 3 ex officio members:
  - The Lord Chancellor of Ireland, intended as the presiding officer of the Senate. The Lord Chancellor had previously been the chairman of the Irish House of Lords in the Parliament of Ireland prior to its abolition.
  - The Lord Mayor of Dublin and the Lord Mayor of Cork.
- 17 "Representatives of Commerce (including Banking), Labour, and the Scientific and Learned Professions" to be nominated by the Lord Lieutenant of Ireland for a term of 10 years.
- 44 members elected by various interest groups from among their respective memberships, using the single transferable vote for 10-year terms, except for county councillors.
  - 4 Archbishops or Bishops of the Catholic Church holding Sees situated wholly or partly in Southern Ireland.
  - 2 Archbishops or Bishops of the Church of Ireland holding Sees situated wholly or partly in Southern Ireland.
  - 16 Peers (not necessarily members of the Peerage of Ireland) who were taxpayers or ratepayers in respect of property and had residences in Southern Ireland.
  - 8 Members of His Majesty's Privy Council in Ireland of no less than two years standing who were taxpayers or ratepayers in respect of property in and had residences in Southern Ireland.
  - 14 Representatives of county councils, for a term of three years, with:
    - 4 from each of Leinster, Munster, and Connaught
    - 2 from the three Ulster counties not in Northern Ireland (Cavan, Donegal, and Monaghan)

In the event, only forty senators were selected, as the labour movement, the Catholic Church, and the Lord Mayors and county councils (controlled by Sinn Féin) refused to co-operate. Of those elected, many had participated in the Irish Convention of 1917–18. Of the incomplete membership, not all attended its few sessions. Some were subsequently members of the Free State Seanad at its 1922 inauguration, either appointed by W. T. Cosgrave, the President of the Executive Council, or elected by the TDs of the Free State Dáil.

== Meetings ==
=== Formal meetings in 1921 ===
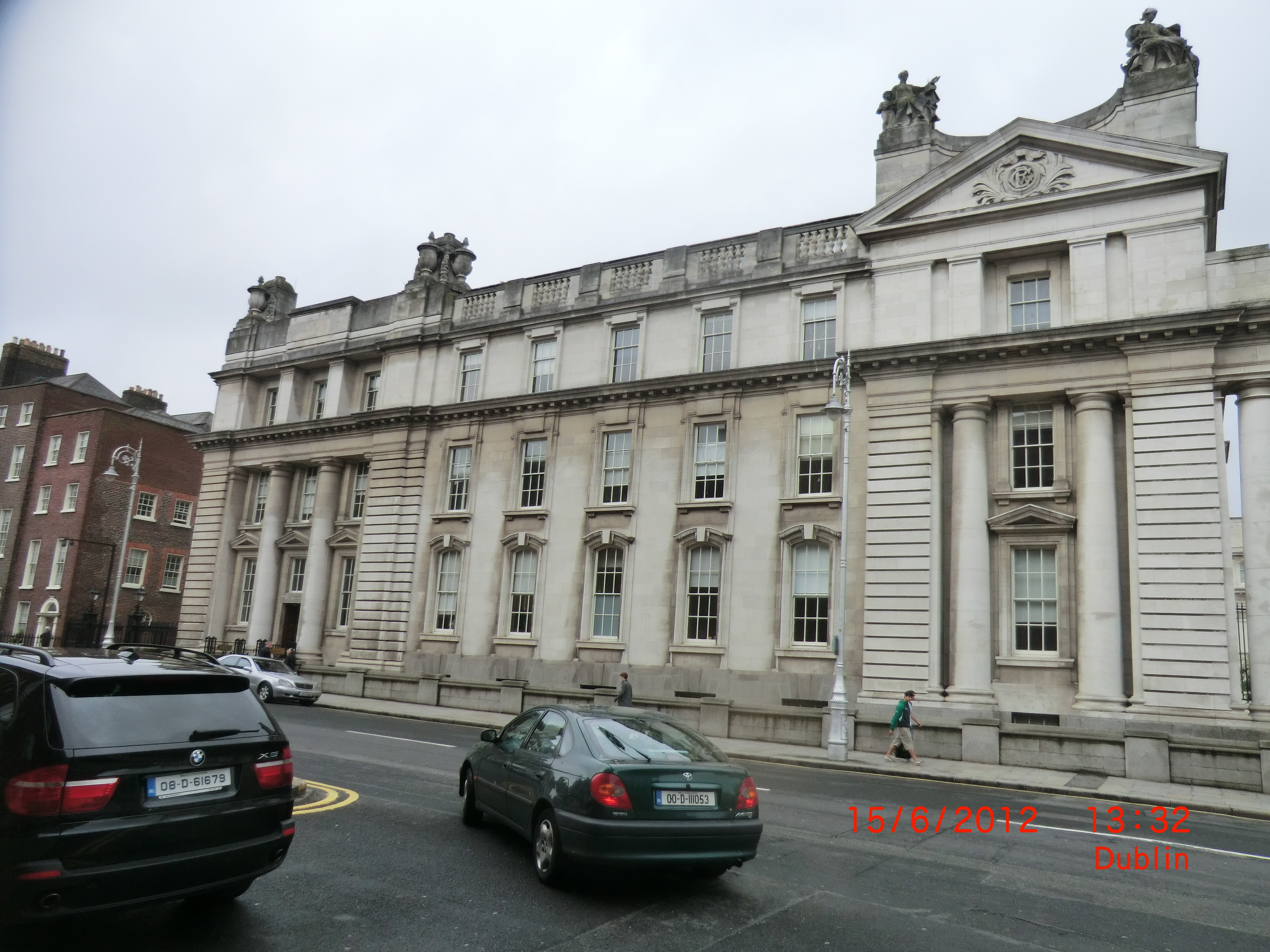
Entrance to the former Council Chamber of the Department of Agriculture and Technical Instruction on Upper Merrion Street in Dublin, where the Parliament of Southern Ireland briefly met in June and July 1921

The parliament met twice, on 28 June and 13 July 1921, for about 15 minutes each time. The first meeting was attended by 15 senators and the four Unionist MPs, the second by 11 senators and two MPs. Both meetings were held in the offices of the Department of Agriculture and Technical Instruction for Ireland in Merrion Street, adjacent to the Royal College of Science for Ireland in a building complex which is now Government Buildings used by several Departments of state of the Government of Ireland. The Senate met in the department's Council Chamber and the Commons in a smaller adjoining room.

On 3 May a proclamation was issued by Viscount FitzAlan of Derwent, the newly appointed (and last ever) Lord Lieutenant of Ireland, which specified the election dates for the Northern and Southern Commons and Southern Senate, and the dates of the inaugural post-election meetings of both Parliaments. The inaugural meeting was for preliminaries such as election of a Speaker. The Northern Parliament's inaugural meeting was opened by FitzAlan on 7 June, and was followed on 22 June by the State Opening performed by George V. The inaugural meeting of the Southern Parliament was scheduled the week after the State Opening of the Northern Parliament. Gerald Horan as Clerk of the Crown and Hanaper had been returning officer in the Commons and Senate elections.

FitzAlan was away on 28 June, so his duties at the inaugural meeting were performed by Thomas Molony and Charles O'Connor, respectively Lord Chief Justice of Ireland and Master of the Rolls, fulfilling the office of Lords Justices of Ireland. The ceremony was in the Department of Agriculture's Council Chamber, with the Commons departing to their own separate room thereafter. The speech by Molony was largely about taking the British parliamentary oath:

Senators and members of the House of Commons of Southern Ireland,— I have it in command from his Majesty to let you know that as soon as senators and a sufficient number of members of the House of Commons have been sworn, the causes of his Majesty calling this Parliament of Southern Ireland will be declared to you.
Members of the House of Commons,— You will be sensible that the co-operation of a larger number of members of your House than are present here to-day is to be desired for the election of a person to whom the office of Speaker should be entrusted. You will, however, choose one of your number to act as your chairman for the time being, and it will fall to the person so chosen to direct the times and manner in which the oath may be taken in your House. I am charged to remind you that by law the continuance of this Parliament is not assured unless the oath is taken by one-half at least of the total number of members of your House within fourteen days from to-day.
Members of the Senate,— Your presence here to-day testifies to the willingness of considerable and influential sections of the population of Southern Ireland to accept the powers and responsibilities of self-government. You will doubtless wish to ratify this acceptance and confirm your position as senators without delay, and the necessary arrangements will be made for the purpose.

Sir John Ross, who as Lord Chancellor of Ireland was ex-officio chairman of the Senate, was absent through illness, so senators appointed Nugent Everard as acting chairman. The Commons appointed Gerald Fitzgibbon acting chairman. Gerald Horan served as acting clerk of both Houses and administered the oath to each acting chairman, who then administered it to his fellow legislators. Each House then adjourned for a period of two weeks, the maximum period allowed for members to subscribe to the oath. Between the two meetings several more senators took the oath in Horan's office. Not all of these attended a meeting.

The second meeting came two days after the truce ending the War of Independence. Ross presided in the Lords, thanking Molony, O'Connor, and Everard for their deputising roles at the previous meeting. The only business in either house was a vote proposed in the Senate by George O'Callaghan-Westropp thanking George V for his 7 June speech, credited by loyalists with encouraging the moves towards a truce. The only MPs in attendance were acting chairman Fitzgibbon and Professor James Craig. Both houses then adjourned sine die. Horan was obliged to notify the Lord Lieutenant that the number of MPs who had taken the oath was less than half the total. This meant a State Opening ("the causes of his Majesty calling this Parliament of Southern Ireland [being] declared") would not occur. In such a case the Lord Lieutenant was empowered to dissolve the Parliament and establish a committee-based administration dubbed "crown colony government". It was widely expected that this would happen, but the truce gave the prospect of an agreement and encouraged the British to hold off on taking such an inflammatory step.

=== January 1922 meeting of Commons members ===
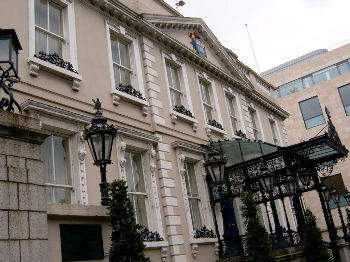
The Mansion House, the location where members elected to the House of Commons met on 14 January 1922.

The Anglo-Irish Treaty was signed in London on 6 December 1921 by representatives of the British Government and envoys of the Irish Republic who claimed plenipotentiary status. On 7 January 1922, Dáil Éireann voted to approve the Treaty. However, in accordance with its terms, the Anglo-Irish Treaty needed to be approved "at a meeting of members of the Parliament elected for constituencies in Southern Ireland".

A meeting in the Mansion House was convened on 14 January 1922 by Arthur Griffith as Chairman of the Irish Delegation of Plenipotentiaries (who had signed the Anglo-Irish Treaty) of "members of the Parliament elected for constituencies in Southern Ireland". Griffith's actions led to discussions between the Irish Treaty delegation and the British Government over who had authority to convene the 'meeting' as under the Government of Ireland Act 1920 the Lord Lieutenant of Ireland (then Viscount FitzAlan of Derwent) was the office-holder with the entitlement and power to convene a meeting of the House of Commons of Southern Ireland. The meeting was attended by 64 pro-Treaty Sinn Féin TDs and four Unionist MPs from the University of Dublin; it elected Alderman Liam de Róiste, one of the representatives of Cork Borough, as chairman (although at this time Eoin MacNeill was Ceann Comhairle of Dáil Éireann), duly ratified the Treaty and nominated Michael Collins for appointment as Chairman of the Provisional Government. Collins was installed in his post by the Lord Lieutenant in Dublin Castle on 16 January 1922 and formed the Provisional Government of Ireland. The members at this meeting did not take the parliamentary oath required by MPs in the House of Commons.

== Supersession ==
The Irish Free State (Agreement) Act 1922 was passed on 31 March 1922 by the British Parliament. It gave the force of law to the Anglo-Irish Treaty, which was scheduled to the Act. Section 1(2) of the Act provided that for the purposes of giving effect to Article 17 of the Treaty the Parliament of Southern Ireland would be dissolved within four months from the passing of the Act. On 27 May 1922, when Viscount FitzAlan of Derwent, the Lord Lieutenant of Ireland, formally dissolved it and by proclamation called "a Parliament to be known as and styled the Provisional Parliament". An election to this Provisional Parliament was held on 16 June 1922. A dissolution of Parliament is distinct from abolishing the Parliament; Lord Oranmore argued that the Senate of Southern Ireland could continue as a chamber of the Provisional Parliament, stating the Parliament of Southern Ireland "consists of a Senate and a House of Commons; and the fact that Parliament is dissolved does not have any effect upon the Senators, who are elected for periods, in most cases of ten years".

On 6 December 1922, the Constitution of the Irish Free State came into force and Southern Ireland ceased to form part of the United Kingdom. The Oireachtas of the Irish Free State was a bicameral parliament consisting of Dáil Éireann and Seanad Éireann. Westminster's Irish Free State (Consequential Provisions) Act 1922 provided that the Government of Ireland Act 1920 would no longer apply outside Northern Ireland.

== See also ==
- Irish Home Rule Movement
- Irish Republic
- Parliament of Northern Ireland, set up under the same legislation to legislate for Northern Ireland
- Peerage of Ireland

== Bibliography ==
- Jackson, Alvin (2004). Home Rule: An Irish History 1800–2000. Phoenix Press. ISBN 0-7538-1767-5.
