= List of acts of the Parliament of the United Kingdom enacted without the House of Lords' consent =

This is a list of acts of the Parliament of the United Kingdom that were enacted without the consent (approval) of the House of Lords.

== Pursuant to the Parliament Act 1911 ==
The following are the acts of Parliament enacted without the consent of the Lords via the use of the Parliament Act 1911:

- Government of Ireland Act 1914
  Repealed by Government of Ireland Act 1920
- Welsh Church Act 1914
- Parliament Act 1949

== Pursuant to the Parliament Acts 1911 and 1949 ==
The following are the acts of Parliament enacted without the consent of the Lords via the use of the Parliament Acts 1911 and 1949:

- War Crimes Act 1991 (Note: Only act enacted without the consent of the Lords by a Conservative government.)
- European Parliamentary Elections Act 1999
  Repealed and consolidated in the European Parliamentary Elections Act 2002
- Sexual Offences (Amendment) Act 2000
  Consolidated in Sexual Offences Act 2003 and the Sexual Offences (Scotland) Act 2009
- Hunting Act 2004

== See also ==
- List of legislation in the United Kingdom
