= Government of Ireland Act 1914 =

Act of the Parliament of the United Kingdom providing Ireland with home rule

Government of Ireland Act 1914 (Note: Section 51.)
- Act of Parliament
- Parliament of the United Kingdom
- Long title: An Act to provide for the better Government of Ireland.
- Citation: 4 & 5 Geo. 5. c. 90
- Territorial extent: United Kingdom

Dates
- Royal assent: 18 September 1914
- Commencement: 18 September 1914 (Note: The Acts of Parliament (Commencement) Act 1793. Postponed by Suspensory Act 1914 (4 & 5 Geo. 5. c. 88).)
- Repealed: 23 December 1920
Other legislation
Amended by	Suspensory Act 1914
Repealed by	Government of Ireland Act 1920
Relates to	Government of Ireland Bill 1886; Irish Government Bill 1893; Local Government (Ireland) Act 1898

Status: Repealed

Text of statute as originally enacted

Third Home Rule Bill

Name and origin
- Official name of legislation: Government of Ireland Act 1914
- Location: United Kingdom
- Year: 1914
- Government introduced: Asquith

Parliamentary passage
- House of Commons passed?: Yes
- House of Lords passed?: No; passed under Parliament Act 1911
- Royal Assent?: Yes

Defeated
- Which House: House of Lords, three times (overruled)
- Date: 1912, 1913, 1914 (overruled)

Details of legislation
- Legislature type: Bicameral
- Name(s): Upper: Senate; Lower: House of Commons
- Size(s): Senate: 40; House of Commons: 164
- MPs in Westminster: 42 MPs
- Executive head: Lord Lieutenant
- Executive body: Executive Committee of the Privy Council of Ireland

Enactment
- Act implemented: Never implemented
- Succeeded by: Government of Ireland Act 1920

The Government of Ireland Act 1914 (4 & 5 Geo. 5. c. 90), also known as the Home Rule Act, and before enactment as the Third Home Rule Bill, was an act of the Parliament of the United Kingdom to provide home rule (self-government within the United Kingdom) for Ireland. It was the third such bill introduced by a Liberal government during a 28-year period in response to agitation for Irish Home Rule.

The act was the first law ever approved by the Parliament of the United Kingdom that provided for a devolved government in any part of the UK proper (as opposed to colonial territories). However, the implementation of both it and the equally controversial Welsh Church Act 1914 (4 & 5 Geo. 5. c. 91) was formally postponed for a minimum of twelve months with the beginning of the First World War. The continuation of the war beyond 1915 and subsequent developments in Ireland resulted in further postponements, meaning that the Act never became effective; it was finally superseded by a fourth home rule bill, enacted as the Government of Ireland Act 1920, which partitioned Ireland, creating Northern Ireland and Southern Ireland, both intended to have Home Rule.

== Background ==
During 1909, a constitutional crisis began when the House of Lords rejected David Lloyd George's Finance Bill. Two general elections occurred in January and December 1910, both of which left the Liberals and Conservatives equally matched, with John Redmond's Irish Parliamentary Party having the balance of power in the House of Commons. The Irish Parliamentary Party, which had campaigned for home rule for Ireland since the 1870s, pledged to assist the Liberals in return for the introduction of a home rule bill. The Parliament Act 1911 then replaced the unlimited veto of the Lords with one lasting only 2 years, ensuring that a bill passed by the Commons could not be blocked for more than two years.

== The Bill ==
The Prime Minister, H. H. Asquith, introduced the bill on 11 April 1912. Allowing more autonomy than its two predecessors, the bill provided that:

- A bicameral Irish Parliament would be established in Dublin (a 40-member Senate and a 164-member House of Commons) with powers to deal with most national affairs. Each of the four provinces of Ireland would be represented by ten senators elected by proportional representation.
- A reduced number of members of parliament representing Ireland would continue to attend the Parliament of the United Kingdom (42 MPs, rather than 103).
- The Dublin Castle administration would be eliminated, although with the retention of the Lord Lieutenant.

The financial situation was a concern. Irish taxes had yielded a surplus of £2 million in 1893, but by 1910 that had become a current spending net deficit of £1.5m, which had to be raised by London. An annual "Transferred Sum" mechanism was proposed, so that public spending in Ireland could be continued at the same level.

The Bill was passed by the Commons by a majority of 10 votes in 1912, but in January 1913 the House of Lords rejected it by 326 votes to 69. Later in 1913, it was reintroduced and again passed by the Commons and rejected by the Lords, this time by 302 votes to 64. In 1914, after the third reading, the Bill was passed by the Commons on 25 May 1914 by a majority of 77. Having been defeated a third time in the Lords, the Government used the provisions of the Parliament Act 1911 to override the Lords and send the bill for royal assent.

== Ulster crisis ==
Unionists in Ulster were opposed to a home-rule Ireland governed from Dublin. Hostility to the Home Rule Bill was increasing in the counties of Antrim, Armagh, Down, and Londonderry. Early in 1912, some of the residents of that area began forming small local militias. By April 1912, the Irish Unionist Alliance's managing politician, Sir Edward Carson, could review 100,000 marching Ulster Volunteers. On 28 September 1912, more than 500,000 Unionists signed the Ulster Covenant pledging to defy Home Rule by all means possible. The Covenant was developed by Carson and organised by Sir James Craig. This Covenant specifically pledged not to acknowledge any Parliament out of Dublin, nor to obey its laws, nor pay any taxes levied by its government. This would be problematic especially since Ulster was the wealthiest and most prosperous part of Ireland.

In January 1913, the Unionist Council reorganised their volunteers into a paramilitary Ulster Volunteer Force (UVF), whose members threatened to resist by physical force the implementation of the Act and the authority of any restored Dublin Parliament by force of arms. On 28 November 1913, Irish Nationalists responded by forming the Irish Volunteers "to secure the rights and liberties common to all the people of Ireland". The government's willingness to effectively oppose the Unionist threat was rendered highly questionable by the Curragh Mutiny of 20 March 1914, when many British Army officers at Curragh in County Kildare, the main Army camp in Ireland, threatened to resign or accept dismissal rather than deploy against the Ulster Volunteers, forcing the government to cancel planned troop movements.

== Partition ==
At the Bill's third reading in the Commons on 21 May 1914 several members asked about a proposal to exclude the whole of Ulster for six years. Asquith was seeking any solution that would avoid a civil war. During the emotional debate which lasted until 25 May 1914, Sir Edward Carson made the statement:

"I say this to my Nationalist fellow-countrymen, and indeed also to the Government, you have never tried to win over Ulster. You have never tried to understand her position. You have never alleged, and you cannot allege, that this Bill gives her one atom of advantage."

A government amending bill was introduced in the House of Lords on 23 June 1914 (before the Lords had considered the original Home Rule bill itself) and passed there with amendments on 8 July. Carson and the Irish Unionist Party (mostly Ulster MPs) backed the amending bill, which provided for "temporary exclusion of Ulster" from the workings of the future Act. The Lords' amendments to the amending bill were unacceptable to the government. What was still to be negotiated were the number of counties excluded (four, six or nine) and whether exclusion would be temporary or permanent. The compromise proposed by Asquith was straightforward. Six counties in northeast Ulster were to be excluded "temporarily" from the territory of the new Irish parliament and government, and continue to be governed as before from Westminster and Whitehall. The length of the exclusion remained an issue of some controversy. To save prolonged debate in parliament, George V called the Buckingham Palace Conference with two MPs each from the Liberal, Conservative, IPP and Irish Unionist parties. The conference, held between 21 and 24 July 1914, achieved very little.

== Passage ==
With the beginning of World War I on 4 August 1914, Asquith decided to abandon his Amending Bill, and instead rushed through a new bill, the Suspensory Act 1914, which was presented for royal assent simultaneously with both the Government of Ireland Act 1914 and the Welsh Church Act 1914. Although the two controversial Bills had now finally become statute on 18 September 1914, the Suspensory Act ensured that Home Rule would be postponed for the duration of the conflict and would not come into operation until the end of the war. (Eventually Home Rule was considered by the Irish Convention in 1917–18, and by the cabinet from September 1919; the Welsh Church Act was delayed until March 1920). The Ulster question was 'solved' in the same way: through the promise of amending legislation which was left undefined.

Dublin was a battlefield for a week during the Easter Rising of 1916. This rebellion would have a major effect on the Home Rule passage and many Home Rulers would be troubled by this event. After the Rising, two attempts were made during the First World War to implement the Act. The first attempt came in June 1916, when Prime Minister H. H. Asquith sent David Lloyd George, then Minister for Munitions, to Dublin to offer immediate implementation to the leaders of the Irish Party, Redmond and Dillon. The scheme concerned partition, officially a temporary arrangement, as understood by Redmond. Lloyd George however gave the Ulster politician, Carson, a written guarantee that Ulster would not be forced into a self-governing Ireland. His tactic was to ensure that neither side would find out before a compromise was implemented. A modified Act of 1914 had been developed by the Cabinet on 17 June. The act had two amendments enforced by Unionists on 19 July – permanent exclusion and a reduction of Ireland's representation in the Commons. When informed by Lloyd George on 22 July 1916, Redmond accused the government of treachery. This was decisive in determining the future fortunes of the Home Rule movement. Lloyd George, now Prime Minister, made a second attempt to implement Home Rule in 1917, with the calling of the Irish Convention directed by Horace Plunkett. This consisted of Nationalist and Unionist representatives who, by April 1918, only succeeded in agreeing on a report with an 'understanding' on recommendations for the establishment of self-government.

The end of the war, in November 1918, was followed by the December 1918 general election. In the Irish part of the election, the majority of seats were won by the republican separatist Sinn Féin. In January 1919, the Irish War of Independence broke out, so that the 1914 act was never implemented. The future of Home Rule was determined by the Government of Ireland Act 1920. It established Northern Ireland, with a functional government, and Southern Ireland, the governmental institutions of which never functioned completely. Following the Anglo-Irish Treaty, Southern Ireland became the Irish Free State.

== See also ==
- History of Ireland (1801–1923)
- Government of Ireland Bill 1886 (First Irish Home Rule Bill)
- Parliament of Southern Ireland
- Parliament of Northern Ireland
- Solemn League and Covenant (Ulster)
- Unionism in Ireland
- List of acts of the Parliament of the United Kingdom enacted without the House of Lords' consent

== Bibliography ==
- Childers, Erskine. The Framework of Home Rule.
- Hennessey, Thomas (1998). Dividing Ireland: World War I and Partition. Routledge. ISBN 0-415-17420-1.
- Jackson, Alvin (2003). Home Rule: an Irish History 1800–2000. Phoenix. ISBN 0-7538-1767-5.
- Kee, Robert (2000) [1972]. The Green Flag: A History of Irish Nationalism. Penguin Adult. ISBN 0-14-029165-2.
- Lee, J.J. (1989). Ireland 1912–1985. Cambridge University Press. ISBN 0-521-37741-2.
- Lewis, Geoffrey (2005). Carson, the Man who divided Ireland. A&C Black. ISBN 1-85285-454-5.
- Rodner, W. S. (1982). "Leaguers, Covenanters, Moderates: British Support for Ulster, 1913–14". Éire—Ireland. 17 (3): 68–85.
- Smith, Jeremy (1993). "Bluff, Bluster and Brinkmanship: Andrew Bonar Law and the Third Home Rule Bill". Historical Journal. 36 (1): 161–174. doi:10.1017/S0018246X00016150. S2CID 159691644.
- Shepard, Walter James (1912). "The Government of Ireland Home Rule Bill". The American Political Science Review. 6 (4): 564–573. doi:10.2307/1944652. JSTOR 1944652. S2CID 147674647.
- Stewart, A.T.Q. (1967) [1979]. The Ulster Crisis, Resistance to Home Rule, 1912–14. London: Faber and Faber. ISBN 0-571-08066-9.
- Government of Ireland Act 1914, available from the House of Lords Record Office
- "Home Rule Finance" Arthur Samuels KC (1912) Text online at Archive.org
