= Welsh Church (Amendment) Act 1938 =

Act of the Parliament of the United Kingdom

Welsh Church (Amendment) Act 1938 (Note: Section 2.)
- Act of Parliament
- Parliament of the United Kingdom
- Long title: An Act to amend paragraph (b) of subsection (1) of section nineteen of the Welsh Church Act, 1914.
- Citation: 1 & 2 Geo. 6. c. 39
- Territorial extent: United Kingdom

Dates
- Royal assent: 13 July 1938
- Commencement: 13 July 1938 (Note: The Acts of Parliament (Commencement) Act 1793.)
Other legislation
Amends	Welsh Church Act 1914
Relates to	Welsh Church (Temporalities) Act 1919

Status: Current legislation

Text of statute as originally enacted

Revised text of statute as amended

Text of the Welsh Church (Amendment) Act 1938 as in force today (including any amendments) within the United Kingdom, from legislation.gov.uk.

Welsh church (amendment) act 1938 · TXT

The Welsh Church (Amendment) Act 1938 (1 & 2 Geo. 6. c. 39) is an act of the Parliament of the United Kingdom that amended the Welsh Church Act 1914 (4 & 5 Geo. 5. c. 91) to allow the University College of Swansea (now called Swansea University) to be eligible to receive residue from the disestablished Church in Wales in the same way as the three colleges of the University of Wales that had been in existence in 1914.

== History ==
The Welsh Church Act disestablished the Church in Wales from the Church of England and also partially disendowed the church as it was no longer an established church. The church lost private endowments granted to it before the Act of Uniformity in 1662, which were to be transferred by the Commissioners for Church Temporalities in Wales to the University of Wales, though the Church in Wales were later compensated for this under the Welsh Church (Temporalities) Act 1919. The 1914 Act provided that some of these endowments would be held by the University of Wales for the benefit of "the University College of Wales, Aberystwyth, the University College of North Wales, the University College of South Wales and Monmouthshire, and the National Library of Wales." As the three university colleges would each receive a fourth of all monies and the National Library of Wales an eighth, the federal University of Wales retained for its own use the remaining eighth.

The Welsh Church (Amendment) Act 1938 received royal assent on 13 July 1938.

== Provisions ==
To cover the omission of the University College of Swansea (which was not founded until 1920) from receiving portions of the endowments, the 1938 act was passed specifically to amend section 19(1)(b) of the 1914 act to include it in the list of colleges of the University of Wales entitled to receive the endowments as well as reducing each individual university college's entitlement to three-sixteenths. (The National Library of Wales and the University of Wales continued each to receive an eighth). It also provided that the Act was to be construed with the 1914 and 1919 Acts, and that the three Acts could be cited together as the Welsh Church Acts 1914 to 1938.
