= Welsh Church Commissioners =

The Welsh Church Commissioners (whose full official title was "The Commissioners for Church Temporalities in Wales") (Note: The Commissioners are referred to throughout the Welsh Church Act 1914 as the "Welsh Commissioners", but s. 10(2) explains that the members of the body to be known as "The Commissioners of Church Temporalities in Wales" are referred to in the Act by the term "the Welsh Commissioners". This therefore also applies to the other Acts which are to be construed as one with the 1914 Act. They are generally referred to – including in the National Archives, the academic literature and reported court cases – as the "Welsh Church Commissioners".) were set up by the Welsh Church Act 1914 to deal with the disendowment of the Church of England in Wales, as part of its disestablishment. Their task was to ascertain which ecclesiastical assets the future Church in Wales should retain, and which should be transferred to local authorities, and to various Welsh national institutions. They were required to transfer those assets which the Church in Wales was entitled to retain to the Representative Body of the Church in Wales. The remaining assets were to be transferred to the thirteen county councils and four county borough councils which existed in Wales until 1974, and to the University of Wales and its constituent colleges. For various reasons which are explained below, the process took considerably longer than was first envisaged. The commissioners could not ultimately be wound up until 1947. The assets transferred constituted the "Welsh Church Act Funds" of the respective institutions. The county and county borough councils (both the councils originally bearing those titles, and their post-1996 unitary successors) hold the funds for charitable and other purposes. The funds are still in existence.

As part of their responsibilities, the Welsh Church Commissioners also organised the border polls which were held in 1915 (and again in two places in 1916) in parishes which straddled the administrative border between England and Wales.

== Historical background ==
The campaigns by Welsh Liberals and Nonconformists which called for disestablishment of the Church of England in Wales had also called for a greater or lesser measure of disendowment. Some campaigners even went as far as to call for the secularisation of the four ancient cathedrals: for example, in the Welsh Disestablishment Bill 1894. The principal moral argument for disendowment was that the Church of England, as the established church in Wales, had accumulated many of its assets in past centuries, by gift or by bequests in wills, when it was a national church which enjoyed the loyalty of most residents. On the other hand, when the religious census was taken in 1851, roughly 80% of those who were attending places of worship were attending Nonconformist places of worship, and fewer than 20% of worshippers were attending Anglican services. Campaigners for disestablishment therefore argued that it was not just that the Established Church of England in Wales should continue to enjoy all of the assets given to the "national" church, when it was ministering to only a minority of the population. Fairness, it was argued, dictated that those assets should be made more generally available.

== The precedent of the Church of Ireland ==
When the Irish Church had been disestablished by the Irish Church Act 1869, its partial disendowment had been carried through by a Church Temporalities Commission, and it was decided to carry out the disendowment of the Church in Wales in a similar way. But although there were similarities between the positions of the Churches in Wales and in Ireland, there were also important differences. The Church of Ireland and the Church of England had been separate churches until the Acts of Union 1800, and only then united into a single “United Church of England and Ireland”. Their organisation and finances were therefore substantially separate, and there was a separate Board of Ecclesiastical Commissioners for Ireland which was distinct from the Ecclesiastical Commissioners in England (and Wales). The Church Temporalities Commission completed its functions by 1881, and was then dissolved.

== The complex position of the Church of England in Wales ==
The Church in Wales, unlike the Irish Church, had formed part of the Church of England since the Middle Ages. The four Welsh dioceses formed an integral part of the Province of Canterbury; the Welsh dioceses extended beyond the England-Wales border; some parishes in Wales formed part of English dioceses; and some parishes straddled the boundary. To disentangle the finances and assets of the Church in Wales from those of the Church of England would therefore take more time and effort than had been required to ascertain which assets should be retained by the Church of Ireland, when it resumed its separate identity.

The Commissioners’ role was complicated by the fact that what were broadly referred to as “Church assets”, were in fact vested in a variety of owners. In Wales, as in England, “The Church of England” was not a legal entity, but an aggregation of numerous separate legal entities. Some of the historic assets of the four dioceses of the Church in Wales had been transferred to the Ecclesiastical Commissioners following the Ecclesiastical Commissioners Acts of 1836 and 1840. Other assets were held on behalf of the Church in Wales by Queen Anne's Bounty. Parochial assets were vested in the incumbent – the rector or vicar of the parish – on the basis of his “parson's freehold” in the benefice. The glebe land of ancient parish churches might at one time been farmed by the incumbent personally, though by the time of disestablishment such glebeland as remained was usually rented out to another local farmer. In some cases the historic glebeland of a church might be subject to a lease or leases for commercial purposes, or even subject to mining leases. Many incumbents, particularly rectors of ancient parishes, would also have been entitled to receive tithes on most classes of agricultural produce though this had been replaced from 1836 onwards by tithe rentcharge payments, a payment charged on the land which varied with the price of corn. In some parishes – chiefly where former monastic lands had been sold after the Dissolution of the Monasteries – tithe rentcharge was payable to a lay landowner. The payment of tithes was unpopular even in many areas of England where the Church of England held the allegiance of most farmers: it was therefore seen as even more of an imposition in areas such as Wales where the overwhelming majority of farmers did not adhere to the Church of England.

== The work of the Welsh Church Commissioners ==
The main tasks of the Welsh Church Commissioners were therefore:

- to identify what assets were owned by the incumbents of the parishes, dioceses, and cathedral chapters of the Church of England in Wales;
- to identify where those assets were derived from, and when;
- to apply the principles set out in sections 4 to 8 of the Welsh Church Act 1914 to determine which assets the Church in Wales should retain, and which should be secularised;
- to transfer those assets which the Church was entitled to retain to a body representing the Church in Wales (this was referred to by the Church as the “Representative Body of the Church in Wales");
- to transfer burial grounds of the Church in Wales to the relevant local government authority, if it wished to accept them; and
- to transfer the remaining assets derived from parochial benefices to the thirteen county councils and four county borough councils, as they existed in Wales prior to 1974, and assets derived from elsewhere to the University of Wales, its three colleges then existing, and the National Library of Wales. (Note: The section is a little confusing, because of the way it is set out. It provided for the residue of the non-parochial assets to pass to the University of Wales, but for the university to hold that residue for the benefit of "the University College of Wales, Aberystwyth, the University College of North Wales, the University College of South Wales and Monmouthshire, and the National Library of Wales." As the three university colleges were each to receive a fourth of the residue and the National Library of Wales an eighth, the federal University of Wales would retain for its own use the remaining eighth.)

Although the role of the Welsh Church Commissioners in organising the 1915-16 border polls has been noted, this was by no means their primary responsibility, occupied only a short period of their existence, and was only a very small part of their activities: the border polls had to be carried out, in accordance with the 1914 act, to determine whether the disendowment provisions should be applied to each border parish. The border polls, and other preparatory work on disendowment, took place notwithstanding the passage of the Suspensory Act 1914, which postponed only the "date of disestablishment" when disestablishment and disendowment would be finally effected.

It was estimated that in 1914 the Church of England in Wales enjoyed an income from endowments of approximately £260,000 per year. If disendowment had been carried through as originally intended, it would have lost its pre-1662 endowments, reducing its income by £173,000 per year. Disendowment did not, however, ultimately take place on that scale. The Welsh Church Commissioners were required, under the terms of the 1914 act, to compensate individual clergymen who were entitled to receive income from tithe rentcharge, (Note: Following the Tithe Commutation Act 1836, incumbents who were entitled to receive traditional tithes of produce were issued with tithe rentcharge of such an amount as would provide them with an income equivalent to what they had received through their tithes. Tithe rentcharge of a specified nominal value was placed on each parcel of agricultural land affected. The actual amount payable each year per £100 nominal value of tithe rentcharge was set by Government order, which varied with the average market price of corn. The amount set was based on a seven-year average, so as to “smooth” what was payable, and avoid violent fluctuations.) by capitalising the value of future payments, based on their age and future life expectancy, and to pay that sum to the Representative Body. Due to the agricultural conditions prevailing during the First World War, the value of the tithe rentcharge had risen from £77 (per £100 nominal amount of tithe rentcharge) in August 1914 to £136 in August 1919. (Note: The value of tithe rentcharge had increased so steeply during the First World War that it was necessary for Parliament to pass the Tithe Act 1918 which froze tithe rentcharge at its 1918 level until 1926, and provided that thereafter it was to be varied in line with an average calculated over 15 years rather than 7 years.) Due to economic conditions prevailing after the First World War, the interest rate that the Commissioners had to pay on borrowings to make the capitalised payments had risen to over 5%. These changes meant that the financial basis upon which the Welsh Church Commissioners had been intended to operate would no longer work, as they could not afford the interest payments on what they would need to borrow to make the capitalisation payments that were required. The Welsh Church (Temporalities) Act 1919 therefore "oiled the wheels" by providing for a once and for all outright payment of £1,000,000 from the Treasury to the Welsh Church Commissioners. A few hard-line pro-disestablishment Nonconformist Liberals such as David Davies, MP, and journalist and former Member of Parliament W. Llewelyn Williams opposed this partial re-endowment. The political situation had changed, however: Liberal MPs who had favoured disendowment, and Conservatives who had formerly opposed it, were now all supporters of Lloyd George's Coalition Government.

By 1919 most Members of Parliament just wished to get disestablishment implemented. The 1919 Act effected only a partial re-endowment. It is difficult to compare the estimated figures from before the First World War with the combined effect of the 1914 and 1919 Acts, but Bishop Owen of St Davids estimated that the Church in Wales had lost an estimated £48,000 per year: considerably less than the loss of £173,000 per year predicted in 1914.

The Welsh Church Commissioners remained in existence for considerably longer than originally intended. They had to incur large borrowings in order to pay the capitalised value of the tithe rentcharge payments, and they were saddled for many years with making the interest payments. Not until 1942 and 1947 could they ultimately transfer the residue to the beneficiaries: these payments totalled £3,455,813 10s 8d. By the time that the distribution of residue took place the University College of Swansea (founded 1920) had been added to the list of educational beneficiaries under the terms of the Welsh Church (Amendment) Act 1938. (Note: As a result of this Act the four colleges of the University of Wales each received 3/16 of the residue, the National Library of Wales received one eighth, and the University of Wales received one eighth for itself as a federal entity.)

== Burial grounds ==
The problems caused by the issue of the transfer of burial grounds also complicated the winding down and ultimate dissolution of the Welsh Church Commissioners. Burial grounds had been a contentious issue in Wales in the late nineteenth century. In many rural areas the churchyard of the local parish church was the only available burial ground. Since the passing of the Burial Laws Amendment Act 1880 nonconformists had been entitled to be buried in such churchyards without the burial service having to follow Anglican rites, but some incumbents refused to concede this entitlement. Lloyd George had achieved a prominence for himself throughout Wales in 1888 when he, as a young solicitor, had taken the Llanfrothen Burial Case on appeal to the Divisional Court of the Queen’s Bench Division. The case established the right of the family of a deceased nonconformist to have his body buried in Llanfrothen parish churchyard, by a Baptist minister, and without using the Anglican burial service. The intention of the Welsh Church Act 1914 was that ownership of many churchyards, and other church burial grounds, would pass to local authorities, which would then maintain them. Many local authorities did not wish to assume responsibility for such grounds, so they remained vested in the Welsh Church Commissioners, and the local parochial church council looked after them, although under no legal obligation to do so. In 1944 the Church in Wales indicated that it would be prepared to take responsibility for those churchyards and burial grounds which had not already been transferred to local authorities, on the basis that ownership was transferred back to them. This was effected by the Welsh Church (Burial Grounds) Act 1945. This enabled the Welsh Church Commissioners to divest themselves of these pieces of land, which represented a burden rather than assets of value, and paved the way for the final winding up of the Commissioners in 1947.
