= Welsh Church (Burial Grounds) Act 1945 =

Act of the Parliament of the United Kingdom

Welsh Church (Burial Grounds) Act 1945 (Note: Section 6(1).)
- Act of Parliament
- Parliament of the United Kingdom
- Long title: An Act to amend the provisions of the Welsh Church Act 1914 relating to burial grounds and for purposes connected therewith.
- Citation: 8 & 9 Geo. 6. c. 27
- Territorial extent: United Kingdom

Dates
- Royal assent: 15 June 1945
- Commencement: 15 June 1945 (Note: The Acts of Parliament (Commencement) Act 1793.)
Other legislation
Amends	Welsh Church Act 1914
Amended by	Statute Law Revision Act 1950

Status: Amended

Text of statute as originally enacted

Revised text of statute as amended

Text of the Welsh Church (Burial Grounds) Act 1945 as in force today (including any amendments) within the United Kingdom, from legislation.gov.uk.

The Welsh Church (Burial Grounds) Act 1945 (8 & 9 Geo. 6. c. 27) is an act of the Parliament of the United Kingdom. The act relates to burial grounds in Wales that were intended to be transferred from the Church of England to Welsh local authorities following the separation of the Church in Wales from the Church of England, its independence, and its simultaneous disestablishment.

== History ==
When the Welsh Church Act 1914 (4 & 5 Geo. 5. c. 91) was passed to disestablish the Church in Wales, the intention was that the Welsh Church Commissioners would transfer ownership of burial grounds and churchyards in Wales, and responsibility for their maintenance, from parish churches to local authorities, though the Representative Body of the Church in Wales retained a number of ancient churchyards. Often local authorities did not wish to accept legal responsibility for churchyards and burial grounds, and, although some were transferred, many remained vested in the Welsh Church Commissioners. As a result, the Church in Wales continued to look after them despite having no legal obligation to do so. In 1944, the Church in Wales informed the Government of the United Kingdom that they would be prepared to take responsibility for the burial grounds that had not passed to local authorities. Parliament passed the Welsh Church (Burial Grounds) Act 1945 unopposed to allow for the transfer of churchyards and burial grounds from the Welsh Church Commissioners back to the control of the Church in Wales.

== Provisions ==
The Welsh Church (Burial Grounds) Act 1945 stated that the Church in Wales would be responsible for the maintenance of burial grounds that were transferred to it under the provisions of the statute. The Representative Body of the Church in Wales delegated that requirement to individual parochial church councils. The Act also granted local authorities the power but not the duty to take the burial grounds back from individual churches if they became full or the church became redundant. The continuation of parishioners' legal right to be buried in churchyards and burial grounds belonging to a disestablished church was viewed as one of the "vestiges of establishment" which the Church in Wales retained, despite being disestablished and separate from the Church of England.

== Subsequent developments ==
Section 6(2) was repealed by section 1 of, and the first schedule to, the Statute Law Revision Act 1950 (14 Geo. 6. c. 6), which came into force on 23 May 1950.
