= Government of Ireland Act 1920 =

Act of the Parliament of the United Kingdom

Government of Ireland Act 1920 (Note: Section 76(1).)
- Act of Parliament
- Parliament of the United Kingdom
- Long title: An Act to provide for the better Government of Ireland.
- Citation: 10 & 11 Geo. 5. c. 67
- Introduced by: David Lloyd George (Commons)
- Territorial extent: United Kingdom of Great Britain and Ireland

Dates
- Royal assent: 23 December 1920
- Commencement: 3 May 1921 (Note: Section 73)
- Repealed: United Kingdom: 2 December 1999; Republic of Ireland: 8 May 2007
Other legislation
| Repeals/revokes | Government of Ireland Act 1914 |
| Amended by | Representation of the People Act 1948; Statute Law Revision Act 1953; Statute Law Revision Act 1963; National Loans Act 1968; Pensions (Increase) Act 1971; Judicature (Northern Ireland) Act 1978; Statute Law (Repeals) Act 1993 |
| Repealed by | United Kingdom: Northern Ireland Act 1998; Republic of Ireland: Statute Law Revision Act 2007 |

Status: Repealed

Text of statute as originally enacted

Revised text of statute as amended

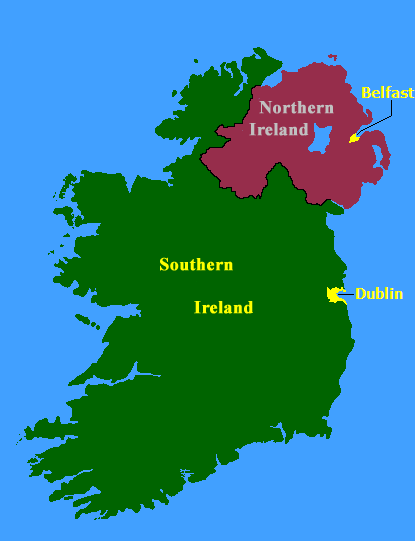
Northern and Southern Ireland

The Government of Ireland Act 1920 (10 & 11 Geo. 5. c. 67) was an act of the Parliament of the United Kingdom. The act's long title was "An Act to provide for the better government of Ireland"; it is also known as the Fourth Home Rule Bill or (inaccurately) as the Fourth Home Rule Act and informally known as the Partition Act. The act was intended to partition Ireland into two self-governing polities: the six north-eastern counties were to form "Northern Ireland", while the larger part of the country was to form "Southern Ireland". Both territories were to remain part of the United Kingdom of Great Britain and Ireland and provision was made for their future reunification through a Council of Ireland. The Act was passed by the British Parliament in November 1920, received royal assent in December and came into force on 3 May 1921.

The smaller Northern Ireland was duly created with a devolved government and remained in the UK. The larger Southern Ireland was not recognised by most of its citizens, who instead recognised the self-declared Irish Republic in the ongoing Irish War of Independence. The conflict resulted in the Anglo-Irish Treaty in December 1921. Under the treaty, Ireland would leave the UK (with the option for Northern Ireland to opt out and remain in the UK, which it immediately did) in December 1922 and become the Irish Free State, which would later evolve into today's Republic of Ireland. The institutions set up under this Act for Northern Ireland continued to function until they were suspended by the British parliament in 1972 as a consequence of the Troubles.

The remaining provisions of the act still in force in Northern Ireland were repealed under the terms of the 1998 Good Friday Agreement.

== Background ==
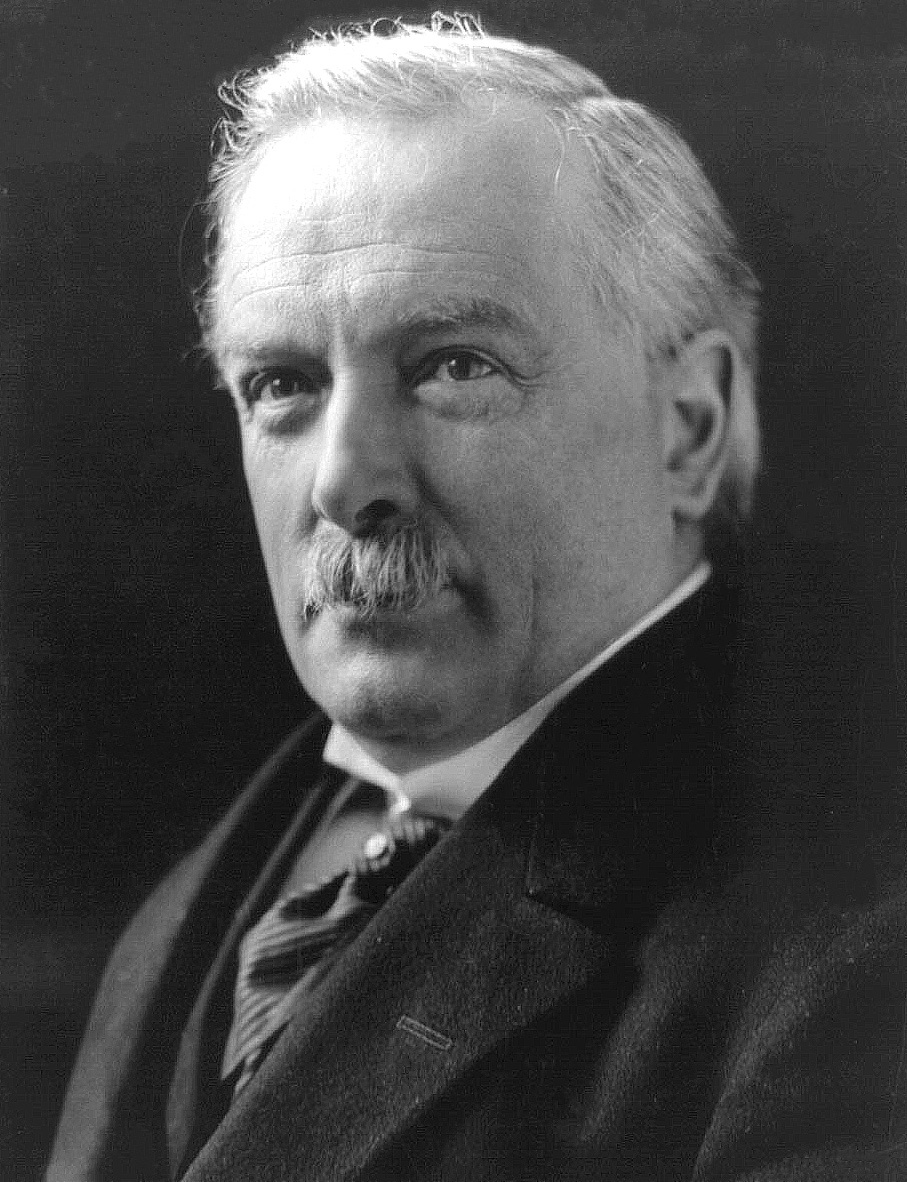
David Lloyd George, MP. The British Prime Minister was the author of the new Act.

Various attempts had been made to give Ireland limited regional self-government, known as Home rule, in the late 19th and early 20th centuries.

The First Home Rule Bill of 1886 was defeated in the House of Commons because of a split in the Liberal Party over the principle of Home Rule, while the Second Home Rule Bill of 1893, having been passed by the Commons was vetoed by the House of Lords. The Third Home Rule Bill introduced in 1912 by the Irish Parliamentary Party could no longer be vetoed after the passing of the Parliament Act 1911 which removed the power of the Lords to veto bills. They could merely be delayed for two years.

Because of the continuing threat of civil war in Ireland, King George V called the Buckingham Palace Conference in July 1914 where Irish Nationalist and Unionist leaders failed to reach agreement. Controversy continued over the rival demands of Irish Nationalists, backed by the Liberals (for all-Ireland home rule), and Irish Unionists, backed by the Conservatives, for the exclusion of most or all of the province of Ulster. In an attempt at compromise, the British government put forward an amending bill, which would have allowed for Ulster to be temporarily excluded from the working of the act; this failed to satisfy either side and the stalemate continued until overtaken by the outbreak of World War I. A few weeks after the British entry into the war, the act received royal assent, while the amending bill was abandoned. However, the Suspensory Act 1914 (which received royal assent on the same day) meant that implementation would be suspended for the duration of what was expected to be only a short European war.

== Developments in Ireland ==
During the Great War, Irish politics moved decisively in a different direction. Several events, including the Easter Rising of 1916, the subsequent reaction of the British Government and the Conscription Crisis of 1918, had altered the state of Irish politics and contributed to Sinn Féin becoming the dominant voice of Irish nationalism. Sinn Féin, standing for 'an independent sovereign Ireland', won 73 of the 105 parliamentary seats on the island in the 1918 general election. The Sinn Féin elected members refused to take their seats in the British Parliament and were pledged to attend their own "constituency assembly" (Dáil Éireann). Therefore, the elected Sinn Féin representatives did not vote on the Government of Ireland Act 1920. They established their own Parliament (First Dáil), which declared the country's independence as the Irish Republic. Dáil Éireann, after a number of meetings, was declared illegal in September 1919 by the Lord Lieutenant of Ireland, Viscount French.

When the act became law on 23 December 1920 it was already out of touch with realities in Ireland. The long-standing demand for home rule had been replaced among nationalists by a demand for complete independence (an Irish Republic). The Republic's army was waging the Irish War of Independence against British rule, which had reached a nadir in late 1920.

== Long's committee and bill approval ==
A delay ensued because of the effective end of the First World War in November 1918, the Paris Peace Conference, 1919 and the Treaty of Versailles that was signed in June 1919. Starting in September 1919, with the British Government, now led by David Lloyd George, committed under all circumstances to implementing Home Rule, the British cabinet's Committee for Ireland, under the chairmanship of former Irish Unionist Alliance leader Walter Long, pushed for a radical new solution. Long proposed the creation of two Irish home rule entities, Northern Ireland and Southern Ireland, with separate parliaments. The House of Lords accordingly amended the old bill to create a new bill which provided for two bicameral parliaments instead of unicameral parliaments, "consisting of His Majesty, the Senate of (Northern or Southern) Ireland, and the House of Commons of (Northern or Southern) Ireland."

The bill's second reading debates in late March 1920 revealed that already a large number of Irish MPs present felt that the proposals were unworkable. At a cabinet meeting on 23 July 1920 the Secretary of State for War and Air, Winston Churchill stated his support for the act but also stated that he would raise a force of 30,000 men in Ulster for use against rebels there and in the south of Ireland.

For a variety of reasons all the Ulster Unionist MPs at Westminster voted against the act. They preferred that all or most of Ulster would remain fully within the United Kingdom, accepting the proposed northern Home Rule state only as the second best option. The Long Committee originally called for all nine Counties of Ulster to be included in Northern Ireland. When it became clear that three counties of Ulster would be excluded from Northern Ireland, southern Unionists left the Irish Unionist Alliance (dissolved in 1922) and formed the Unionist Anti-Partition League in opposition to the impending partition of Ireland.

After considerable delays in debating the financial aspects of the measure, the substantive third reading of the bill was approved by a large majority on 11 November 1920. On that date, Thomas Harbison, MP for North East Tyrone, predicted that violence would result in his constituency:

"This is not a Bill for the better government of Ireland. I believe that the people in the county that I represent would be legally justified in using every form of resistance in their power to prevent this Act, if it ever becomes an Act, from coming into operation. It is a sentence of death, in my opinion, upon us as a unit in that Parliament. Our liberties are gone; and if the younger men of Ireland become indignant, and take courses that no sane man could defend, who will be responsible? The responsibility will be upon the men who have produced this Bill at the dictates of a narrow-minded set of reactionaries in the North-East corner of Ulster. It is a very small corner of Ulster; I have the map of it here. A set of reactionaries in that corner will have us under their heel for all time. I know the feeling of the men whom I represent, and I assure you, on this Armistice night, when all should be peace, that you are going to create, not peace, but eternal dissatisfaction, division, and, I am afraid, destruction."

A considerable number of the Irish Members present voted against the bill, including Southern Unionists such as Maurice Dockrell and members of the Irish Parliamentary Party like Joseph Devlin. The act was passed by a vote of Ayes, 183; Noes, 52. Most Irish MPs were abstaining from Westminster and sitting in Dáil Éireann, Dublin.

== Two 'Home Rule' Irelands ==
The act divided Ireland into two territories, Southern Ireland and Northern Ireland, each intended to be self-governing, except in areas specifically reserved to the Parliament of the United Kingdom: chief amongst these were matters relating to the Crown, to defence, foreign affairs, international trade and currency. Speaking in Caernarvon in October 1920, Lloyd George stated his reasoning for reserving specific governmental functions: "The Irish temper is an uncertainty and dangerous forces like armies and navies are better under the control of the Imperial Parliament."

Northern Ireland was defined as "the parliamentary counties of Antrim, Armagh, Down, Fermanagh, Londonderry and Tyrone, and the parliamentary boroughs of Belfast and Londonderry", and Southern Ireland was defined as "so much of Ireland as is not comprised within the said parliamentary counties and boroughs". Northern Ireland, amounting to six of the nine counties of Ulster, was seen as the maximum area within which Unionists could be expected to have a safe majority. However, at the 1918 general election, counties Fermanagh and Tyrone had Irish nationalist (Sinn Féin/Irish Parliamentary Party) majorities. On 14 December 1921, Lloyd George spoke of the position of Tyrone and Fermanagh:

There is no doubt—certainly since the Act of 1920—that the majority of the people of two counties prefer being with their Southern neighbours to being in the Northern Parliament... What does that mean? If Ulster is to remain a separate community, you can only by means of coercion keep them there... Apart from that, would it be an advantage to Ulster? There is no doubt it would give her trouble. It would be a trouble at her own door, a trouble which would complicate the whole of her machinery, and take away her mind from building. She wants to construct; she wants to build up a good Government, a model Government, and she cannot do so as long as she has got a trouble like this on her own threshold, nay, inside her door.

== Structures of the governmental system ==
At the apex of the governmental system was to be the Lord Lieutenant of Ireland, who would be the monarch's representative in both of the Irish home rule regions. The system was based on colonial constitutional theories. Executive authority was to be vested in the crown and, in theory, not answerable to either parliament. The Lord Lieutenant would appoint a cabinet that did not need parliamentary support. No provision existed for a prime minister.

Such structures matched the theory in the British dominions, such as Canada and Australia, wherein powers belonged to the governor-general and there was no normal responsibility to parliament. In reality, governments had long come to be chosen from parliament and to be answerable to it. Prime ministerial offices had come into de facto existence. (Note: A prime minister of Canada had come into existence within a decade of colonial rule in Canada, while in Australia a prime minister appeared in the system of government from the moment the Federal Commonwealth of Australia came into being in 1901.) Such developments were also expected to happen in Northern Ireland and Southern Ireland, but technically were not required under the act.

== Constituency reform ==
The Act revised the constituencies in the Redistribution of Seats (Ireland) Act 1918 for elections to the Parliament of the United Kingdom. In place of the 105 UK MPs for all of Ireland in 1918, there were to be 33 UK MPs from Southern Ireland and 13 UK MPs from Northern Ireland. The same constituencies were to elect 128 MPs to the Southern Ireland House of Commons and 52 MPs to the Northern Ireland House of Commons. Elections for the two Irish parliaments took place in May 1921. No elections were held in Southern Ireland to the United Kingdom House of Commons as the Irish Free State was due to be established on 6 December 1922, less than a month after the 1922 United Kingdom general election.

== Potential for Irish unity ==
As well as sharing the same viceroy, a Council of Ireland was to be composed of 20 members from each parliament. The council would co-ordinate matters of common concern to the two parliaments (transport, health, agriculture etc.). Each parliament was to possess the ability, in identical motions, to vote powers to the council, which Britain intended should evolve into a single Irish Parliament. The preamble to the Bill is absolutely clear that partition need not be more than a temporary measure:

"The Act contemplates and affords every facility for union between north and south, and empowers the two Parliaments by mutual agreement and joint action to terminate partition and set up one Parliament and one Government for the whole of Ireland."

The council had little real power – the provisions of the act called for the council to promote consultations which could lead to eventual unity. The Council of Ireland never met.

== Aftermath ==
=== Northern Ireland ===
The Parliament of Northern Ireland came into being in June 1921. Northern Ireland itself is considered to have been established on 3 May 1921 - the date on which the Government of Ireland Act came into force. The first meetings of the Parliament of Northern Ireland were held at Belfast City Hall. At its inauguration, in Belfast City Hall, King George V made a famous appeal for Anglo-Irish and north–south reconciliation. The speech, drafted by the government of David Lloyd George on recommendations from Jan Smuts (Note: Jan Smuts was one of the best Boer commanders of the Second Boer War. His deep Commando raids into Cape Province caused considerable embarrassment and difficulties for the British Army. After the war he decided that his future and that of South Africa lay in reconciliation between Afrikaner and the British. In 1914 at the start of World War I the Boer "bitter enders" rose against the government in the Boer Revolt and allied themselves with their old supporter Germany. General Smuts played an important part in crushing the rebellion and defeating the Germans in Africa, before fighting on the Western Front. The South African establishment, of which Smuts was a part, in contrast to the British establishment in 1916, was lenient to the leaders of the revolt, who were fined and spent two years in prison. After this revolt and lenient treatment the "bitter enders" contented themselves with working within the system. It was his experience of the Boer–British rapprochement which he was able to bring to the attention of the British government as an alternative to confrontation.) Prime Minister of the Union of South Africa, with the enthusiastic backing of the King, opened the door for formal contact between the British Government and the Republican administration of Éamon de Valera.

Though it was superseded in large part, its repeal remained a matter of controversy until accomplished in the 1990s (under the provisions of the 1998 Good Friday Agreement).

=== Southern Ireland ===
All 128 MPs elected to the House of Commons of Southern Ireland in the May 1921 elections were returned unopposed; 124 of them, representing Sinn Féin, declared themselves TDs (Teachtaí Dála, Irish for Dáil Deputies) and assembled as the Second Dáil of the Irish Republic.

With only the four Independent Unionist MPs, who had been elected for the Dublin University constituency and fifteen appointed senators turning up for the state opening of the Parliament of Southern Ireland at the Royal College of Science in Dublin (now Government Buildings) in June 1921, the new legislature was suspended. Southern Ireland was ruled, for the time being, directly from London as it had been before the Government of Ireland Act.

The Provisional Government of the Irish Free State was constituted on 14 January 1922 "at a meeting of members of the Parliament elected for constituencies in Southern Ireland". That meeting was not convened as a meeting of the House of Commons of Southern Ireland nor as a meeting of the Dáil. Instead, it was convened by Arthur Griffith as "Chairman of the Irish Delegation of Plenipotentiaries" (who had signed the Anglo-Irish Treaty) under the terms of the Treaty. (Note: This followed discussions between the Irish Treaty delegation and the British Government over who had authority to convene the "meeting".)

Elections in June 1922 were followed by the meeting of the 3rd Dáil, which worked as a Constituent Assembly to draft a constitution for the Irish Free State. For the purposes of British law the constitution was confirmed by the Irish Free State Constitution Act 1922; the new state then came into being on 6 December 1922.

=== Consequences ===
The Treaty provided for the ability of Northern Ireland's Parliament, by formal address, to opt out of the new Irish Free State, which as expected, the Parliament of Northern Ireland brought into effect on 7 December 1922 (the day after the establishment of the Irish Free State). An Irish Boundary Commission was set up to redraw the border between the new Irish Free State and Northern Ireland, but it remained unchanged in return for financial concessions and the British and Irish governments agreed to suppress its report. In regards to the possible loss of territory due to the Boundary Commission's findings, on 25 January 1922 James Craig, the 1st Prime Minister of Northern Ireland stated: ""I will never give in to any re-arrangement of the boundary that leaves our Ulster area less than it is under the Government of Ireland Act" The newly formed Government of Northern Ireland refused to appoint a representative to the Boundary Commission. The Council of Ireland never functioned as hoped (as an embryonic all-Ireland parliament), as the new governments decided to find a better mechanism in January 1922.

In consequence of the establishment of the Irish Free State, the British parliament passed the Irish Free State (Consequential Provisions) Act 1922, which made a number of adjustments to Northern Ireland's system of government as set up by the 1920 act. Most notably, the office of Lord Lieutenant was abolished, being replaced by the new office of Governor of Northern Ireland.

== Subsequent developments ==
The following provisions were repealed by section 1 of, and the first schedule to, the Statute Law Revision Act 1953 (2 & 3 Eliz. 2. c. 5), which came into force on 18 December 1953. In section ten, in subsection (2), the words from " The rates, fares, tolls," to the end of the subsection. In section 21, in subsection (2), the words " any charge for the benefit of the Local Taxation (Ireland) Account, or ".

- In section 23, in subsection (5), the words " as the case requires, either ".
- Subsection (2) of section 34.
- In section 45, the proviso.
- Subsection (2) of section 59.

The final provisions of the 1920 act remaining in force in the United Kingdom were repealed under the terms of the Northern Ireland Act 1998, after the Good Friday Agreement. In the republic, the Statute Law Revision Act 2007 repealed the act almost 85 years after Constitution of the Irish Free State replaced it as the basic constitutional law.

== Sources ==
=== Primary ===
- "Government of Ireland Act 1920 [as enacted]". legislation.gov.uk. 23 December 1920.
- "Bills index: Government of Ireland Bill". Parliamentary Debates (Hansard). 1918-04-18 et seq.
- Quekett, Arthur S. (1928). The Origin and Development of the Constitution. The Constitution of Northern Ireland. Vol. Part I. Belfast: HMSO.
- Statutory Rules and Orders Other Than Those of a Local, Personal, or Temporary Character. London: HMSO. 1921–1922.
  - 1921: "Ireland, Government of" (pp 359–430), "Supreme Courts and High Court of Appeal, Ireland" (pp 1326–1341)
  - 1922 "Civil Service, Ireland" (pp 90–92), "Irish Free State" (pp 462–479), "Northern Ireland" (pp 686–779), "Supreme Court, Northern Ireland" (pp 1075–1084), "Supreme Court, Southern Ireland (now Irish Free State)" (pp 1085–1086)
- Quekett, Arthur S. (1933). The Government of Ireland Act, 1920 and Subsequent Enactments. The Constitution of Northern Ireland. Vol. Part II. Belfast: HMSO.

=== Secondary ===
- Jackson, Alvin (2004). Home Rule – An Irish History. Oxford University Press.
- Kee, Robert (2000) [1972]. The Green Flag: A History of Irish Nationalism. Penguin. ISBN 0-14-029165-2.
- O'Day, Alan (1998). Irish Home Rule, 1867–1921. Manchester University Press.
- Peled, Yoav (2013). The Challenge of Ethnic Democracy: The State and Minority Groups in Israel, Poland and Northern Ireland. Routledge. ISBN 978-1134448937.
- Thompson, Joseph E. (2001). American Policy and Northern Ireland: A Saga of Peacebuilding. Greenwood Publishing Group. ISBN 0275965171.
- Townshend, Charles (1975). The British Campaign in Ireland, 1919-1921. Oxford University Press. ISBN 0198218745.
