= General Pier and Harbour Act 1861 =

Act of the Parliament of the United Kingdom

General Pier and Harbour Act 1861 (Note: Section 1.)
- Act of Parliament
- Parliament of the United Kingdom
- Long title: An Act to facilitate the Formation, Management, and Maintenance of Piers and Harbours in Great Britain and Ireland.
- Citation: 24 & 25 Vict. c. 45
- Territorial extent: United Kingdom

Dates
- Royal assent: 1 August 1861
- Commencement: 1 August 1861 (Note: The Acts of Parliament (Commencement) Act 1793.)
- Repealed: England and Wales and Scotland: 15 July 1992 (Note: The Transport and Works Act 1992 (Commencement No. 1) Order 1992 (SI 1992/1347).)
Other legislation
Amended by	General Pier and Harbour Act 1861 Amendment Act 1862; Public Works Loans Act 1882; Harbours, Piers and Ferries (Scotland) Act 1937
Repealed by	England and Wales and Scotland: Transport and Works Act 1992.

Status: Partially repealed

Status
- England and Wales: Repealed
- Scotland: Repealed
- Northern Ireland: Amended

Text of statute as originally enacted

Revised text of statute as amended

Text of the General Pier and Harbour Act 1861 as in force today (including any amendments) within the United Kingdom, from legislation.gov.uk.

The General Pier and Harbour Act 1861 (24 & 25 Vict. c. 45) is an act of the Parliament of the United Kingdom.

It was intended to facilitate the construction, management, and maintenance of piers and harbours across Great Britain and Ireland. Its primary purpose was to reduce the high costs associated with obtaining special local acts of Parliament for such works.

It did this by introducing a system of provisional orders ('pier and harbour orders'), which allowed promoters to seek authority from the Board of Trade rather than having to progress a full parliamentary bill for each project. However, the scope of provisional orders was restricted to projects under an expenditure limit of £100,000.

== Subsequent developments ==
The whole act was repealed and replaced for England and Wales and Scotland by section 65(1)(a) and 68(1) of, and part II of schedule 4 to, the Transport and Works Act 1992, which came into fore on 15 July 1992.
