= Welsh Church (Temporalities) Act 1919 =

Act of the Parliament of the United Kingdom

Welsh Church (Temporalities) Act 1919 (Note: Section 9.)
- Act of Parliament
- Parliament of the United Kingdom
- Long title: An Act to continue in office the Welsh Commissioners appointed under the Welsh Church Act, 1914, to postpone the date of disestablishment, and to make further provision with respect to the temporalities of, and marriages in, the Church in Wales.
- Citation: 9 & 10 Geo. 5. c. 65
- Territorial extent: United Kingdom

Dates
- Royal assent: 19 August 1919
- Commencement: 19 August 1919 (Note: The Acts of Parliament (Commencement) Act 1793.)
Other legislation
Amended by	Statute Law Revision Act 1927; Charities Act 1960; Statute Law (Repeals) Act 2004

Status: Amended

Text of statute as originally enacted

Revised text of statute as amended

Text of the Welsh Church (Temporalities) Act 1919 as in force today (including any amendments) within the United Kingdom, from legislation.gov.uk.

The Welsh Church (Temporalities) Act 1919 (9 & 10 Geo. 5. c. 65) is an act of the Parliament of the United Kingdom. It was made to provide for a grant to be made from the Treasury to enable the Welsh Church Commissioners to carry out their task and to set a date for the implementation of the disestablishment of the Church in Wales from the Church of England mandated by the Welsh Church Act 1914 (4 & 5 Geo. 5. c. 91). Operation of the act had been delayed by the Suspensory Act 1914 (c. 88), initially until 18 September 1915, and subsequently by a series of Orders in Council made under the Suspensory Act. The 1919 act therefore provided for a final postponement until the Welsh Church Act 1914 would come into operation.

== History ==
The Welsh Church Act 1914 (4 & 5 Geo. 5. c. 91) was passed despite Conservative opposition in Commons. The Parliament Act 1911 (1 & 2 Geo. 5. c. 13) was invoked to bypass the House of Lords. However the First World War led to the passage of the Suspensory Act 1914 (c. 88) under which implementation of the Welsh Church Act 1914 was delayed until the end of the war. Post-war, one of the reasons behind the Welsh Church (Temporalities) Act was further to delay the disestablishment of the Church in Wales, while finally setting a definite date of 31 March 1920 for disestablishment to take effect.

The 1919 act made provision for the Welsh Church Commissioners appointed by the Welsh Church Act 1914 (4 & 5 Geo. 5. c. 91) to retain their positions, as initially their term of office had been intended to be shorter.

Although the 1919 act addressed these administrative matters, it was chiefly required to address the impossible financial position in which the Welsh Church Commissioners found themselves in 1919. The Welsh Church Commissioners were required, under the terms of the 1914 Act, to compensate individual clergymen who were entitled to receive income from tithe rentcharge, by capitalising the value of future payments, based on their age and future life expectancy, and paying that sum to the Representative Body of the Church in Wales. (Note: The process may be more readily understood if one bears in mind that it is simply the reverse of what occurs when someone who is retiring purchases an annuity.) By 1919, due to the agricultural conditions prevailing during the First World War, the value of the tithe rentcharge had risen from £77 (per £100 nominal value of tithe rentcharge) to £136. Due to the financial conditions prevailing after the First World War, the rate of interest that the Commissioners would need to pay on what they would have to borrow to capitalise these payments had risen to over 5%. The changes in these figures meant that the original projections upon which the Welsh Church Commissioners had been intended to operate would no longer work, as they simply could not realise sufficient assets to make the capitalisation payments that they were required to make to the Representative Body. The 1919 act therefore “oiled the wheels” by providing for a once and for all outright payment of £1,000,000 from the Treasury to the Welsh Church Commissioners. A few hard-line pro-disestablishment Nonconformist Liberals such as David Davies, MP, and journalist and former Member of Parliament W. Llewelyn Williams opposed this partial re-endowment, but the political situation had changed. Liberal MPs who had favoured disendowment, and Conservatives who had formerly opposed it, were now all supporters of Lloyd George's Coalition Government

By 1919 most Members of Parliament just wished to get disestablishment implemented. The 1919 act effected only a partial re-endowment. It is difficult to compare the estimated figures from before the First World War with the combined effect of the 1914 and 1919 acts. Bishop Owen of St David’s wrote a leaflet detailing the financial position that disendowment would place the Church in Wales in and the fact they could not appeal against it. He also stated that his desire that the disestablishment of the Church of England "...may never take place through the impatience or dissensions or indifference of English Churchmen." He estimated that the Church in Wales had lost an estimated £48,000 per year: considerably less than the loss of £173,000 per year predicted in 1914.

Despite separating the Church in Wales from the Church of England, the opportunity was taken to abandon the provision of the Welsh Church Act 1914 which would have assimilated the marriage law of the Church in Wales to that which applied in the Nonconformist Churches and the Roman Catholic Church, and which required (and still requires) that notice be given to the appropriate register office and the presence of a civil registrar at the ceremony. Instead the 1919 act provided for the legal right for people to be married in parish churches to be retained despite the Church in Wales no longer being an established church. The act also allowed for the banns of marriage to continue to be published in the Church in Wales the same way as had been the case when it had been part of the Church of England, thus avoiding the need for notice to be posted at the register office, or for marriages to be performed in the presence of a civil registrar.

== Amendments ==
Following the official disestablishment, several sections of the act were deemed to be spent and were repealed by the Statute Law Revision Act 1927 ([[17 & 18 Geo. 5]]. c. 42) and the Statute Law (Repeals) Act 2004. The sections relating to disestablishment generally and retention of the rights of marriage still remain in force, although the former are covered mainly by the Welsh Church Act 1914.
