= Salisbury Convention =

Constitutional convention in the United Kingdom

The Salisbury Convention (officially called the Salisbury Doctrine, the Salisbury-Addison Convention or the Salisbury/Addison Convention) is a constitutional convention in the United Kingdom under which the House of Lords should not oppose the second or third reading of any government legislation promised in its election manifesto.

The origins of the convention date back to the late 19th century, at which time the Conservatives held a majority in the House of Lords and, with the support of the third Marquess of Salisbury, developed the "Referendal Theory", which applied solely to Liberal legislation, under which the House of Lords could obstruct legislation until it had received majority approval at a general election. This was changed following the landslide Labour Party victory in the 1945 general election, which produced a Labour government seen as having a popular mandate for significant reform, while once again there was a Conservative majority in the House of Lords. The fifth Marquess of Salisbury (grandson of the third) announced that the Lords "would not seek to thwart the main lines of Labour's legislation provided it derived from the party's manifesto for the previous election". From this point, manifesto bills were only to be adjusted by the Lords; however, on non-manifesto bills, the Lords were able to act as they had before.

== Prior practice ==
From the Liberal split over the Irish Home Rule Bill 1886 until the effects of the House of Lords Act 1999, the second chamber had a Conservative majority (or, in later years, quasi-majority given the overall tendency of the crossbenchers to side with Conservatives) so manifesto commitments of the Liberal Party and Labour Party could not be sure of passing. Since the Lords threw out the Liberal budget in 1909, there had been a convention that they do not interfere on financial matters. In the Parliament Act 1911 the Peers lost their right to vote down a financial measure and their veto over other measures was reduced to a two-year delaying power, later reduced to one year by the Parliament Act 1949.

A Conservative majority of Lords used their maximum power, of delaying via wrecking amendments, certain Bills tabled by the 1929–1931 minority Labour ministry. Most legislation worked its way through by threatening use of the Parliament Act 1911.

== Creation ==
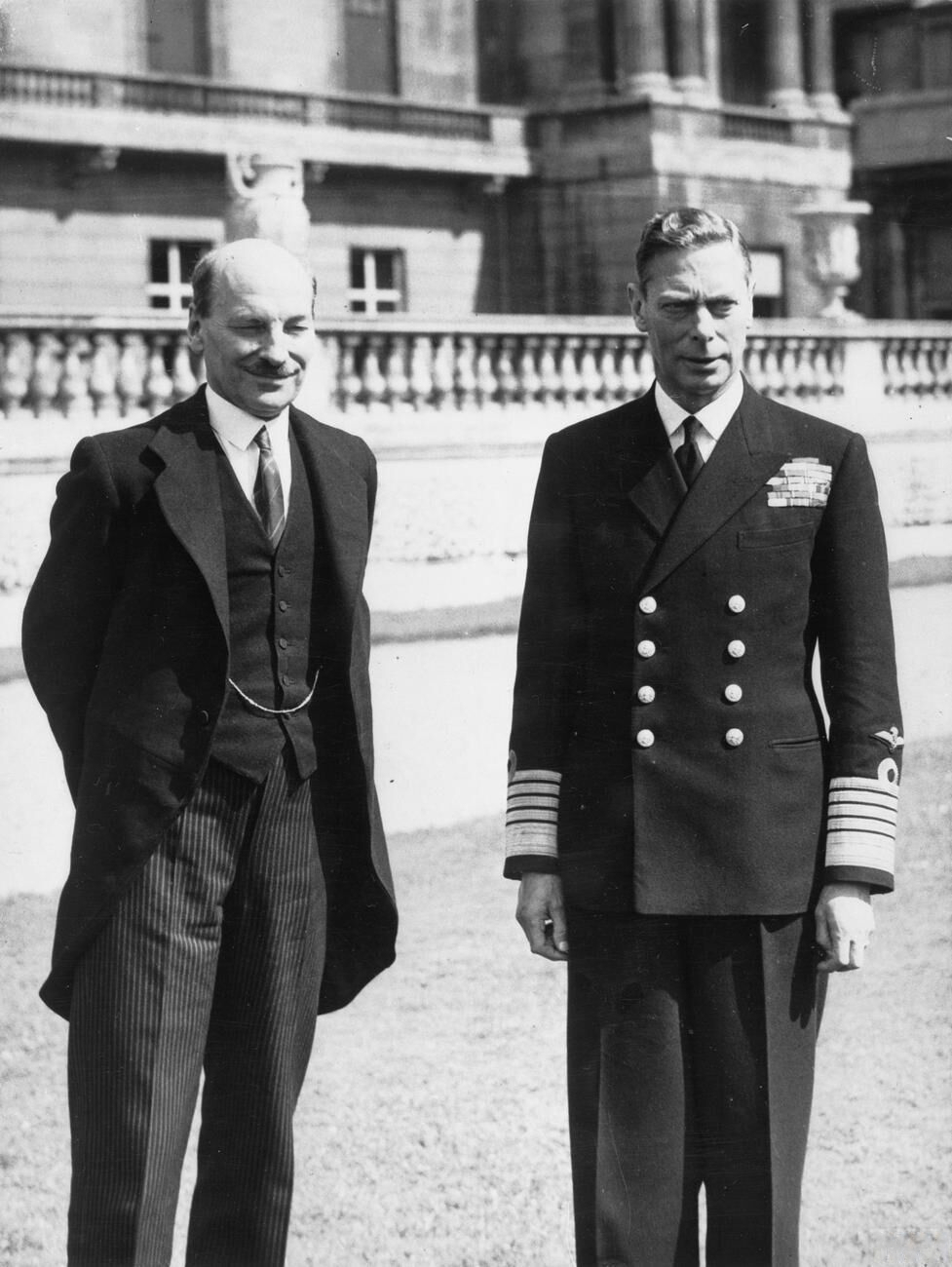
Clement Attlee meeting with King George VI in the grounds of Buckingham Palace, following the Labour victory in the 1945 general election.

At the time of the landslide Labour general election victory in 1945, 16 of more than 761 peers qualified to sit in the House of Lords were Labour-affiliated. This small minority was led by Lord Addison.

As Clement Attlee's Labour government had a clear electoral mandate to deliver the policies of nationalisation and welfare state measures, supporters and commentators supposed that the unelected House of Lords would not oppose the second reading of such legislation. Ministers and ex-ministers in the Lords echoed that the destruction and social plight caused by World War II called for more state spending. However, Lord Salisbury, Conservative Leader in the Lords, offered a lasting statement of principles, now regarded as a constitutional convention, as to the etiquette of how the House of Lords should treat bills fulfilling manifesto promises.

== Definition ==
Lord Addison and the pre-accelerated Lord Salisbury, (Note: Until 1941 Lord Cranborne, heir to the Marquessate of Salisbury, was a member of the House of Commons; he was eligible to sit in that house as his title was a courtesy viscountcy (of insufficient rank to qualify for a seat in the Lords), and he did not hold a title in his own right. In 1941 he was given a writ of acceleration so that he could become Conservative leader in the House of Lords as Baron Cecil of Essendon, although he continued to be known as Lord Cranborne until he succeeded his father as Marquess of Salisbury in 1947.) the Conservative leader in the House of Lords from 1942 to 1957, both with memories of the troubles leading to the passing of the Parliament Act 1911, agreed principles as follows:

- any tabled bills set out in the governing party's manifesto may be subjected to possible short delay but pass; but anything else would be subject to full debate.

In its modern form, the convention:

- permits the offering of reasoned amendments to a motion for second reading of a Government bill, provided such amendments are not wrecking amendments designed to destroy the bill.

== Evolution ==
=== Liberal Democrat dissent in 2005 ===
After the Labour general election victory in 2005, the Liberal Democrats indicated that they did not feel bound by the Salisbury Convention as a result of decreasing voter turnout, the low share of the vote received by the Government, and the changes to the composition of the House of Lords introduced in 1999 by the Labour Government.

=== Application to hung parliament coalitions and minority governments ===
It is mooted that during minority governments and post-election coalitions in which the main party in government does not have a clear majority the Convention does not hold, somewhat enhancing the Lords' power to delay and suggest redrafting of bills.

Following the hung parliament in 2017, the government argued that the convention continued to apply. Baroness Evans of Bowes Park, Leader of the House of Lords, claimed that the convention applied to the Conservative manifesto, but not to their DUP confidence-and-supply partners. Baroness Smith of Basildon, Shadow Leader of the House of Lords, said it was "far from clear that the Salisbury-Addison Convention was ever intended to apply to minority governments". Amendments made by the House of Lords to the European Union (Withdrawal) Act 2018 were described by some MPs, such as Bill Cash, as "wrecking amendments", a view which was contested by Lords.

=== Proposal to codify the Salisbury convention ===
In 2006, Tony Blair appointed Lord Cunningham of Felling, to chair a joint committee (of both Houses) to investigate possibilities of formalising numerous conventions including the Salisbury Convention. The proposals were dropped in favour of maintaining such conventions as part of the more ad hoc unwritten constitution.

== See also ==
- Constitutional conventions of the United Kingdom
- Parliament Acts 1911 and 1949

== Bibliography ==
- Salisbury Doctrine at Parliament.uk
