= Welsh Church Act 1914 =

Act of the Parliament of the United Kingdom

- Act of Parliament
- Parliament of the United Kingdom
- Long title: An Act to terminate the establishment of the Church of England in Wales and Monmouthshire, and to make provision in respect of the Temporalities thereof, and for other purposes in connection with the matters aforesaid.
- Citation: 4 & 5 Geo. 5. c. 91
- Territorial extent: United Kingdom

Dates
- Royal assent: 18 September 1914
- Commencement: 31 March 1920 (Note: See the Suspensory Act 1914 (4 & 5 Geo. 5. c. 88).)
Other legislation
Amended by	Interpretation Act 1889; Welsh Church (Temporalities) Act 1919; Rating and Valuation Act 1925; Statute Law Revision Act 1927; Welsh Church (Amendment) Act 1938; Welsh Church (Burial Grounds) Act 1945; Church Commissioners Measure 1947; Charities Act 1960; London Government Act 1963; Local Government Act 1972; Courts and Legal Services Act 1990; Local Government (Wales) Act 1994; National Assembly for Wales (Transfer of Functions) Order 1999; House of Commons (Removal of Clergy Disqualification) Act 2001; Statute Law (Repeals) Act 2004
Relates to	Clergy Residences Repair Act 1776; Ecclesiastical Commissioners Act 1836; Pluralities Act 1838; Church Discipline Act 1840; Ecclesiastical Commissioners Act 1840; Burial Act 1855; Lord Chancellor's Augmentation Act 1863; Irish Church Act 1869; Bishops Resignation Act 1869; Ecclesiastical Dilapidations Act 1871; Incumbents Resignation Act 1871; Ecclesiastical Dilapidations Act 1872; Deans and Canons Resignation Act 1872; Public Worship Regulation Act 1874; Public Health (Interments) Act 1879; Settled Land Act 1882; Clergy Discipline Act 1892; Trustee Act 1893; Local Government Act 1894; Tithe Rentcharge (Rates) Act 1899; Finance (1909–10) Act 1910; Suspensory Act 1914; Arbitration Act 1950

Status: Amended

Text of statute as originally enacted

Text of the Welsh Church Act 1914 as in force today (including any amendments) within the United Kingdom, from legislation.gov.uk.

The Welsh Church Act 1914 (4 & 5 Geo. 5. c. 91) is an act of the Parliament of the United Kingdom under which the Church of England was separated and disestablished in Wales and Monmouthshire, leading to the creation of the Church in Wales. The act had long been demanded by the Nonconformist community in Wales, which composed the majority of the population and which resented paying taxes to the Church of England. It was sponsored by the Liberal Party (a stronghold of the Nonconformists) and opposed by the Conservative Party (a stronghold of the Anglicans).

== History ==
The Sunday Closing (Wales) Act 1881 (44 & 45 Vict. c. 61) was significant landmark legislation which introduced a religious legal difference to Wales. Welsh university colleges were formed in Cardiff and Bangor in 1883–84 and Welsh issues were prominent in the parliament of 1886–92. The introduction of the Welsh land commission of 1892 and the formation of the University of Wales in 1893 were driven by Welsh Liberals, supported by Welsh Liberal David Lloyd George. Prime Minister William Gladstone also later became more supportive and voted in favour of disestablishment. The two men contributed to Welsh disestablishment and acknowledged the Welsh national consciousness. After 1886 the sentiment of Cymru Fydd developed, with more politicians moving in view towards a Welsh home rule similar to Ireland's, including T. E. Ellis, who also supported disestablishment as a return of religion in Wales to the native order. Whilst the Irish nationalist movement focused on home rule, the Welsh movement focused on disestablishment. The Rosebery government eventually gave in to pressures from Welsh Liberals and Cymru Fydd, and introduced a Welsh Disestablishment Bill 1894. This was rejected; it was followed by another bill in 1909 which was also rejected. Another bill was introduced in 1912, and despite rejection from the House of Lords the bill was passed in 1914 after the Parliament Act allowed overriding of the Lords.

A 70-year continuous campaign for Welsh disestablishment culminated in the passing of the Welsh Church Act in 1914; it came into force in 1920, having been delayed by the First World War. The campaign was motivated by a desire for freedom of religious expression as well as legal and civil equality for Welsh nonconformity. The matter also became associated with a wider movement for the recognition of the Welsh national identity, Welsh distinctiveness and culture and the Welsh language. Although Welsh Liberals were divided on the issue of Welsh home rule in the 1890s, they were united on disestablishment in Wales.

The act was controversial, and was passed by the House of Commons under the provisions of the Parliament Act 1911 (1 & 2 Geo. 5. c. 13), which reduced the power of the House of Lords to block legislation. The main financial terms were that the church no longer received tithe money (a land tax), but kept all its churches, properties and glebes. The Welsh Church Commissioners were set up by the act to identify affected assets and oversee their transfer.

The act was politically and historically significant as one of the first pieces of legislation to apply solely to Wales (and Monmouthshire) as opposed to the wider legal entity of England and Wales.

Owing to the outbreak of the First World War in August 1914, the act was given royal assent on 18 September simultaneously with another controversial bill, the Government of Ireland Act 1914 (4 & 5 Geo. 5. c. 90). In addition, royal assent was given to the Suspensory Act 1914 (c. 88) which provided that the two other acts would not come into force for the remainder of the war. On 31 March 1920 most of the Welsh part of the Church of England became the Church in Wales, an independent province of the Anglican Communion, with (originally) four dioceses led by the Archbishop of Wales. However, 18 out of 19 church parishes which spanned the Welsh–English border overwhelmingly voted in individual referendums to remain within the Church of England.

The Welsh Church Act 1914 and the Government of Ireland Act 1914 were (together with the Parliament Act 1949 (12, 13 & 14 Geo. 6. c. 103) the only acts enacted by invoking the Parliament Act 1911 (1 & 2 Geo. 5. c. 13) until the War Crimes Act 1991.

== Responses ==
English author G. K. Chesterton, an Anglican who would be received into the Roman Catholic Church in 1922, ridiculed the passion that was generated by the bill in his 1915 poem Antichrist, or the Reunion of Christendom: An Ode, repeatedly addressing F. E. Smith, one of the chief opponents of the act.

== Analysis ==
An analysis published by Wales Humanists at an event in the Welsh Parliament in 2020, reflecting on 100 years of disestablishment in Wales, identified the Welsh Church Act 1914 as a critical component in the development in Wales of distinctively pluralistic and secular approaches to governance in the era of devolution.

== See also ==
- Religion in Wales
- Irish Church Act 1869
- List of acts of the Parliament of the United Kingdom enacted without the House of Lords' consent
