= Representative Body of the Church in Wales =

- Formation: 24 April 1919; 107 years ago
- Legal status: Registered charity
- Purpose: Investment
- Headquarters: 2 Callaghan Square, Cardiff
- Region served: Wales
- Chairman: Professor Medwin Hughes
- Parent organization: Church in Wales
- Budget: £20.645 million (2018)
- Endowment: £709.583 million (2018)
- Website: www.churchinwales.org.uk/en/about-us/representative-body/

The Representative Body of the Church in Wales is a registered charity, regulated by the Charity Commission for England and Wales, responsible for holding property and assets on behalf of the Church in Wales. It was set up in 1917 to oversee the financial arrangements of the new province of the Anglican Communion when the Church in Wales split off from the Church of England in 1920.

== History ==
The Church in Wales was created in 1920 under the Welsh Church Act 1914. It is not only a disestablished church but was also disendowed at that time, although it was permitted to retain any post-1662 endowments. The Representative Body had been set up in 1917, so that it could hold the church property and any remaining endowments in trust for the clergy and laity. It was also tasked with the administration of the finances of the church and the pension fund. There was an urgent need for more sources of income and an appeal in 1935 to church members raised £750,000, with a further £600,000 being raised in the 1950s. This enabled the Representative Body to subsidise diocesan funds by up to 70%, but by 2011, income had lagged expenditure, and the subsidy had reduced to 30% of the diocesan costs.

== The Representative Body ==
The Representative Body of the Church in Wales is the central administrative body of the Church in Wales. Its primary function is to manage the Church's financial assets but it also provides centralised support services to the bishops, archdeacons, clergy and lay staff employed by the Church. These services include financial, property, human resources, ICT services and legal support. Its somewhat misleading title - unlike the Governing Body, it is not a representative decision-making body - is derived from the fact that under the Welsh Church Act 1914 the bishops, clergy and laity were required to set up a body to "represent" them, and then to hold property which was transferred to them by the Welsh Church Commissioners.

== Structure ==
Membership of the Representative Body includes the chairman of the Diocesan Board of Finance of each of the member dioceses, the Chairman of the Standing Committee of the Governing Body, the Archbishop of Wales, one cleric and one lay person elected by the Diocesan Conference of each diocese, up to four members nominated by the Bench of Bishops and up to two co-opted members. Clerical members need to hold or have held an ecclesiastical office in the Church in Wales or a licence from a Welsh Diocesan Bishop. Lay members need to be between the ages of eighteen and seventy-five. The Representative Body normally meets three times a year. Membership is for a three-year term and members are also expected to sit on one of the subcommittees, which meet two to four times per year.

== Media ==
The Representative Body found itself to be the centre of media attention in Spring 2017 when it announced the moving of its headquarters from Cathedral Road, Cardiff, to Callaghan Square. Some churchpeople felt the move was quite an expense, while the Representative Body maintained its current buildings were unfit for purpose and a move was necessary. The move went ahead in September 2017.
