= Provisional order =

Provisional order is a method of procedure followed by several government departments in England, authorizing action under various acts of Parliament.

Procedure by provisional order is a substitute for the more expensive course of private bill legislation; it is usually employed for such purposes as alteration of areas, compulsory purchase of land and building of light railways. A preliminary local inquiry is first held in public by an inspector of the department to whom application has been made to issue it. Upon the report of the inspector and other information, the department decides whether or not to issue the order. The order when issued has no force until it is confirmed by Parliament. For this purpose it is included with other orders in a confirming bill, introduced by the minister at the head of the department concerned.

In both houses of Parliament all provisional order bills are referred to examiners for compliance with standing orders. In the House of Lords, if a provisional order bill is opposed, it is referred to a select committee and then to a committee of the whole house; if not opposed, it goes, after second reading, to a committee of the whole house, and in both cases then proceeds as a public bill. In the House of Commons, the bill goes after second reading to the committee of selection or to the general committee on railway and canal bills; if unopposed it is treated as an unopposed private bill; if opposed it goes to a private bill committee, which hears evidence for and against.

These are now rare, having been all but superseded by the Statutory Orders (Special Procedure) Act 1945 (9 & 10 Geo. 6. c. 18), but were common from 1860 to 1945.

A provisional order bill cannot be passed without the consent of the House of Lords under the Parliament Acts 1911 and 1949.
