= Parliament Acts 1911 and 1949 =

United Kingdom legislation establishing the supremacy of the House of Commons

The Parliament Acts 1911 and 1949 are two acts of the Parliament of the United Kingdom, which form part of the constitution of the United Kingdom. Section 2(2) of the Parliament Act 1949 provides that the two Acts are to be construed as one.

The Parliament Act 1911 (1 & 2 Geo. 5. c. 13) asserted the supremacy of the House of Commons by limiting the legislation-blocking powers of the House of Lords (the suspensory veto). Provided the provisions of the Act are met, legislation can be passed without the approval of the House of Lords. Additionally, the 1911 act amended the Septennial Act 1716 to reduce the maximum life of a Parliament from seven years to five years. The Parliament Act 1911 was amended by the Parliament Act 1949 (12, 13 & 14 Geo. 6. c. 103), which further limited the power of the Lords by reducing the time that they could delay bills, from two years to one.

The Parliament Acts have been used to pass legislation against the wishes of the House of Lords on seven occasions since 1911, including the passing of the Parliament Act 1949. Some constitutional lawyers had questioned the validity of the 1949 act. These doubts were rejected in 2005 when members of the Countryside Alliance unsuccessfully challenged the validity of the Hunting Act 2004, which had been passed under the auspices of the Act. In October 2005, the Appellate Committee of the House of Lords dismissed the Alliance's appeal against this decision, with an unusually large panel of nine Law Lords (out of then-existing twelve) holding that the 1949 act was a valid act of Parliament.

== Background ==
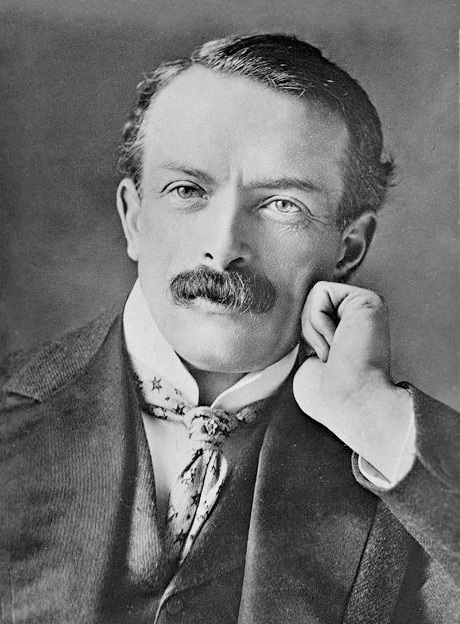
David Lloyd George

Until the Parliament Act 1911, there was no way to resolve disagreements between the two houses of Parliament except through the creation of additional peers by the monarch. Queen Anne had created twelve Tory peers to vote through the Treaty of Utrecht in 1713. The Reform Act 1832 had been passed when the House of Lords dropped their opposition to it: King William IV had threatened to create eighty new peers by request of the prime minister, Earl Grey. This created an informal convention that the Lords would give way when the public was behind the House of Commons. For example, Irish disestablishment, which had been a major point of contention between the two main parties since the 1830s, was passed by the Lords in 1869 after Queen Victoria intervened and W. E. Gladstone won the 1868 election on the issue. However, in practice, this gave the Lords a right to demand that such public support be present and to decide the timing of a general election.

It was the prevailing wisdom that the House of Lords could not amend money bills, since only the House of Commons had the right to decide upon the resources the monarch could call upon. This did not, however, prevent it from rejecting such bills outright. In 1860, with the repeal of the paper duties, all money bills were consolidated into a single budget. This denied the Lords the ability to reject individual components, and the prospect of voting down the entire budget was seemingly unpalatable. It was only in 1909 that this possibility became a reality. Prior to the act, the Lords had had rights equal to those of the Commons over legislation but, by convention, did not utilise its right of veto over financial measures.

There had been an overwhelming Conservative–Liberal Unionist majority in the Lords since the Liberal split in 1886. With the Liberal Party attempting to push through significant welfare reforms with considerable popular support, problems seemed certain to arise in the relationship between the houses. Between 1906 and 1909, several important measures were considerably watered down or rejected outright: for example, Augustine Birrell introduced the Education Bill 1906, which was intended to address nonconformist grievances arising from the Education Act 1902, but it was amended by the Lords to such an extent that it effectively became a different bill, whereupon the Commons dropped it. This led to a resolution in the House of Commons on 26 June 1907, put forward by Liberal Prime Minister Henry Campbell-Bannerman, declaring that the Lords' power ought to be curtailed. In 1909, hoping to force an election, the Lords rejected the financial bill based on the government budget (the "People's Budget") put forward by David Lloyd George, by 350 votes to 75. This action, according to the Commons, was "a breach of the constitution and a usurpation of the rights of the Commons". The Lords suggested that the Commons demonstrate at the polls the veracity of its claim that the bill represented the will of the people. The Liberal government sought to do so through the January 1910 general election. Liberal representation in the House of Commons fell steeply, but the party retained a majority with the help of a significant number of Irish Parliamentary Party (IPP) and Labour MPs. The IPP saw the continued power of the Lords as detrimental to the prospect of securing Irish Home Rule. Following the election, the Lords relented on the budget (which had been reintroduced by the government), and it passed the Lords on 28 April, a day after the Commons vote.

The 1911 act was a reaction to the clash between the Liberal government and the House of Lords, culminating in the so-called "People's Budget" of 1909. In this Budget, the Chancellor of the Exchequer David Lloyd George proposed the introduction of a land tax based on the ideas of the American tax reformer Henry George. This new tax would have had a major effect on large landowners, and was opposed by the Conservative opposition, many of whom were large landowners themselves. The Conservatives believed that money should be raised through the introduction of tariffs on imports, which they claimed would help British industry. Contrary to British constitutional convention, the Conservatives used their large majority in the Lords to vote down the Budget. The Liberals made reducing the power of the Lords an important issue of the January 1910 general election.

The Liberals returned in a hung parliament after the election: their call for action against the Lords had energised believers in hereditary principle to vote for the Conservatives, but had failed to generate much interest with the rest of the voting public. The Liberals formed a minority government with the support of the Labour and Irish nationalist MPs. The Lords subsequently accepted the Budget. However, as a result of the dispute over the Budget, the new government introduced resolutions (that would later form the Parliament Bill) to limit the power of the Lords. The Prime Minister, H. H. Asquith, asked King Edward VII to create sufficient new Liberal peers to pass the Bill if the Lords rejected it. The king said he would not be willing to do so unless Asquith obtained a clear mandate for such sweeping change by winning a second general election.

The Lords voted this 1910 bill down. Edward VII had died in May 1910, but his son George V agreed to grant Asquith a second general election in December 1910 (this also resulted in a minority government), and at the time he agreed that, if necessary, he would create hundreds of new Liberal peers to neutralise the Conservative majority in the Lords. The Conservative Lords then backed down, and on 10 August 1911, the House of Lords passed the Parliament Act by a narrow 131–114 vote, with the support of some two dozen Conservative peers and eleven of thirteen Lords Spiritual.

The Parliament Act was intended as a temporary measure. The preamble states:

whereas it is intended to substitute for the House of Lords as it at present exists a Second Chamber constituted on a popular instead of hereditary basis, but such substitution cannot be immediately brought into operation.

One of the reasons for the Irish Parliamentary Party MPs' support for the Parliament Act, and the bitterness of the Unionist resistance, was that the loss of the Lords' veto would make possible Irish Home Rule (i.e. a devolved legislature). The previous Liberal government's attempt to initiate Irish Home Rule had been vetoed by the House of Lords in 1893: at the time of his retirement in 1894, William Ewart Gladstone had not attracted sufficient support from his colleagues for a battle with the House of Lords. The Parliament Act resulted in the eventual enactment of the Irish Home Rule Government of Ireland Act 1914.

== Parliament Act 1911 ==
Parliament Act 1911 (Note: Section 8.)
- Act of Parliament
- Parliament of the United Kingdom
- Long title: An Act to make provision with respect to the powers of the House of Lords in relation to those of the House of Commons, and to limit the duration of Parliament.
- Citation: 1 & 2 Geo. 5. c. 13
- Territorial extent: United Kingdom

Dates
- Royal assent: 18 August 1911
- Commencement: 18 August 1911 (Note: The Acts of Parliament (Commencement) Act 1793.)
Other legislation
Amended by	Parliament Act 1949; National Loans Act 1968

Status: Amended

Text of statute as originally enacted

Text of the Parliament Acts 1911 and 1949 as in force today (including any amendments) within the United Kingdom, from legislation.gov.uk.

The Parliament Act 1911 (1 & 2 Geo. 5. c. 13) is an act of the Parliament of the United Kingdom. It is constitutionally important and partly governs the relationship between the House of Commons and the House of Lords, the two Houses of Parliament. The Parliament Act 1949 provides that the Parliament Act 1911 and the Parliament Act 1949 are to be construed together "as one" in their effects and that the two acts may be cited together as the Parliament Acts 1911 and 1949.

The act effectively removed the right of the House of Lords to veto money bills completely, and replaced its right of veto over other public bills with the ability to delay them for a maximum of two years (the Parliament Act 1949 reduced this to one). It also reduced the maximum term of a parliament from seven years (as set by the Septennial Act 1716) to five.

Following the House of Lords' rejection of the 1909 People's Budget, the House of Commons sought to establish its formal dominance over the House of Lords, which had broken convention in opposing the bill. The budget was eventually passed by the Lords, after the Commons' democratic mandate was confirmed by holding a general election in January 1910. The following Parliament Act, which looked to prevent a recurrence of the budget problems, was also widely opposed in the House of Lords, and cross-party discussion failed, particularly because of the proposed act's applicability to the passage of an Irish Home Rule Bill. Following a second general election in December, the act was passed with the assent of the monarch, George V, after the House of Lords conceded due to the government's threat that the Conservative majority in the Lords could be overcome by creating many new Liberal peers.

=== Passage ===
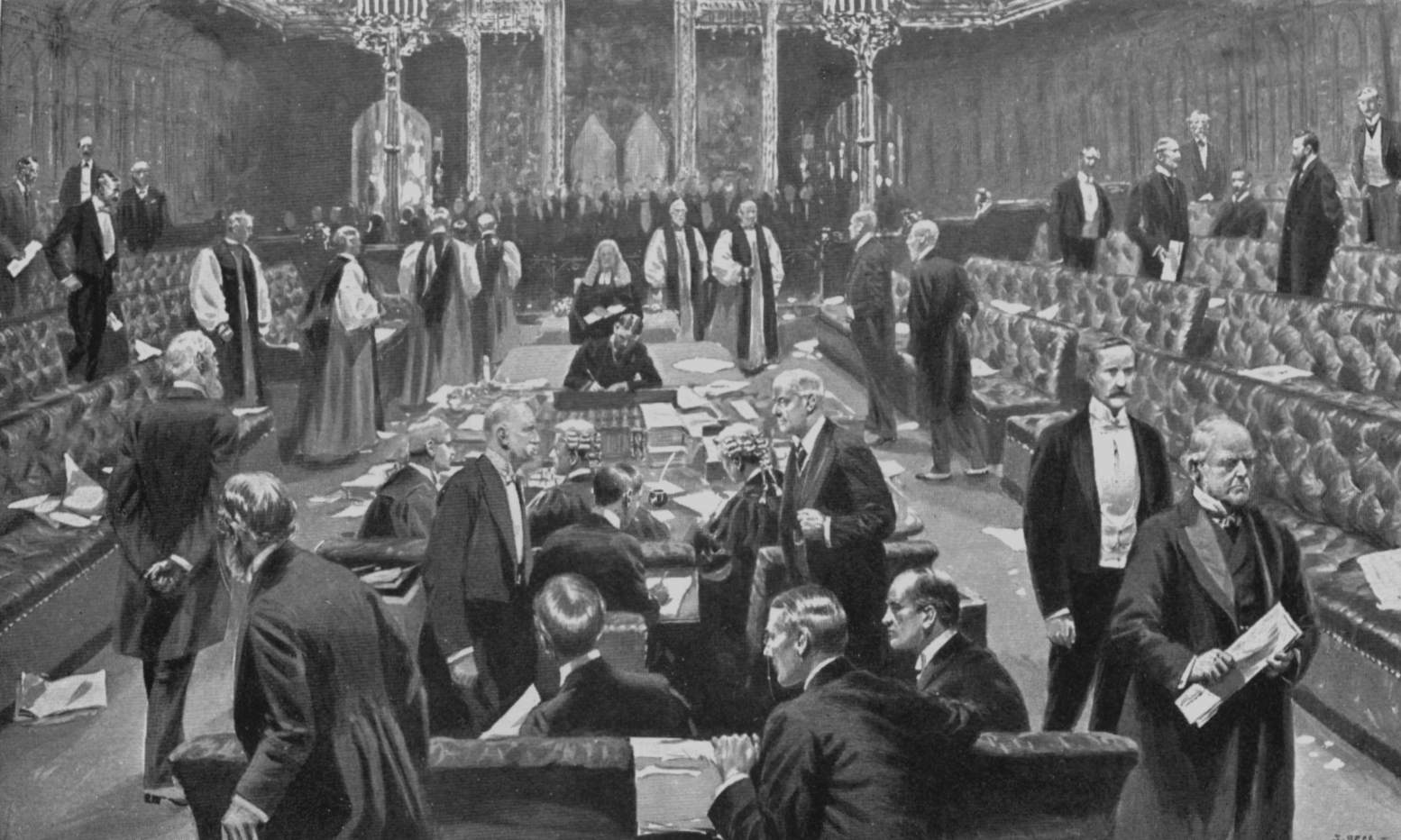
Samuel Begg's depiction of the passing of the Parliament Bill in the House of Lords, 1911

The House of Lords was now faced with the prospect of a Parliament Act, which had considerable support from the Irish Nationalists. A series of meetings between the Liberal government and Unionist opposition members was agreed. Twenty-one such meetings were held between 16 June and 10 November. The discussions considered a wide range of proposals, with initial agreement on finance bills and on a joint sitting of the Commons and the Lords as a means by which to enforce Commons superiority in controversial areas; the number of members of the Lords present would be limited so that a Liberal majority of fifty or more in the House of Commons could overrule the Lords. However, the issue of home rule for Ireland was the main contention, with Unionists looking to exempt such a law from the Parliament Act procedure by means of a general exception for "constitutional" or "structural" bills. The Liberals supported an exception for bills relating to the monarchy and Protestant succession, but not home rule. On 10 November, the discussions were declared to have failed.

The government threatened another dissolution if the Parliament Act were not passed, and followed through on their threat when opposition in the Lords did not diminish. The December 1910 general election produced little change from January. The second dissolution of Parliament now seems to have been contrary to the wishes of Edward VII. Edward had died in May 1910 while the crisis was still in progress. His successor, George V, was asked if he would be prepared to create sufficient peers, which he would only do if the matter arose. This would have meant creating over 400 new Liberal peers. The King, however, demanded that the bill would have to be rejected at least once by the Lords before his intervention. Two amendments made by the Lords were rejected by the Commons, and opposition to the bill showed little sign of reducing. This led H. H. Asquith to declare the King's intention to overcome the majority in the House of Lords by creating sufficient new peers. The bill was finally passed in the Lords on 11 August 1911, by 131 votes to 114, a majority of 17. This reflected a large number of abstentions.

=== Provisions ===
The act abolished any power of the House of Lords to veto any public bill introduced in the House of Commons other than a bill containing any provision to extend the maximum duration of Parliament beyond five years or a bill for confirming a provisional order. The Act does not affect Bills introduced in the House of Lords, private bills, or delegated legislation.

The effect of the act is that the House of Lords can delay those bills that it could formerly veto. If they have been sent up to the House of Lords at least one month before the end of the session, money bills can be delayed for up to one month after being sent up, and other bills can be delayed for up to one year after being sent up. The period for which bills other than money bills could be delayed was originally two years. The Speaker was given the power to certify which bills are classified as money bills.

At the request of prominent Cabinet member Sir Edward Grey, the preamble included the words:

Whereas it is intended to substitute for the House of Lords as it at present exists a Second Chamber constituted on a popular instead of hereditary basis, but such substitution cannot be immediately brought into operation

— Parliament Act 1911, Foreword

The long title of the act was "An Act to make provision with respect to the powers of the House of Lords in relation to those of the House of Commons, and to limit the duration of Parliament." Section 8 defined the short title as the "Parliament Act 1911".

The bill was also an attempt to place the relationship between the House of Commons and House of Lords on a new footing. As well as the direct issue of money Bills, it set new conventions about how the power the Lords continued to hold would be used. It did not change the composition of the Lords, however.

The Lords would only be able to delay money bills for one month, effectively ending their ability to do so. These were defined as any public bill which contained only provisions dealing with the imposition, repeal, remission, alteration, or regulation of taxation; the imposition for the payment of debt or other financial purposes of charges on the Consolidated Fund, or on money provided by Parliament, or the variation or repeal of any such charges; supply; the appropriation, receipt, custody, issue or audit of accounts of public money; and the raising or guarantee of any loan or the repayment thereof. But it did not cover any sort of local taxes or similar measures. Some finance bills have not fallen within this criterion; Consolidated Fund and Appropriation bills have. The Speaker of the House of Commons would have to certify that a bill was a money bill, endorsing it with a Speaker's certificate. The Local Government Finance Act 1988, which introduced the Community Charge ("Poll Tax"), was not certified as a money bill and was therefore considered by the Lords. Whilst finance bills are not considered money bills, convention dictates that those parts of a finance bill dealing with taxation or expenditure (which, if in an act alone, would constitute a money bill) are not questioned.

Other public bills could no longer be vetoed; instead, they could be delayed for up to two years. This two-year period meant that legislation introduced in the fourth or fifth years of a parliament could be delayed until after the next election, which could prove an effective measure to prevent it being passed. Specifically, two years had to elapse between the second reading in the House of Commons in the first session and the passing of the bill in the House of Commons in the third session. The Speaker also has to certify that the conditions of the bill have been complied with. There are significant restrictions on amendments to ensure that it is the same bill that has been rejected twice. The 1911 act made clear that the life of a parliament could not be extended without the consent of the Lords.

Parliament had been limited to a maximum of seven years under the Septennial Act 1716, but the Parliament Act 1911 amended the Septennial Act to limit Parliament to five years, reckoned from the first meeting of Parliament after the election; it later turned out that that particular parliament would last about eight years due to election postponements related to World War I. In practice, no election was absolutely forced by that limitation; until the Septennial Act was repealed by the Fixed-term Parliaments Act 2011, all parliaments were dissolved by the monarch under the royal prerogative on request of the Prime Minister. The five-year maximum duration in the amended Septennial Act referred to the lifetime of the parliament, and not to the interval between general elections. For example, the 2010 general election was held five years and one day after the 2005 general election; the 1992 general election was held on 9 April 1992 and the next general election was not held until 1 May 1997. The reduction in the maximum length of a parliament was seen as a counterbalance to the new powers granted to the Commons. The Fixed-term Parliaments Act 2011, in contrast, called for general elections every five years (unless called sooner, as in 2017), and provided for an earlier dissolution of Parliament only by certain specified legal procedures. The act was repealed in 2022, restoring the previous system of dissolution under the royal prerogative with a five year limit on duration.

==== Section 1: Powers of House of Lords as to money bills ====
Section 1(1) provides:

If a Money Bill, having been passed by the House of Commons, and sent up to the House of Lords at least one month before the end of the session, is not passed by the House of Lords without amendment within one month after it is so sent up to that House, the Bill shall, unless the House of Commons direct to the contrary, be presented to His Majesty and become an Act of Parliament on royal assent being signified, notwithstanding that the House of Lords have not consented to the Bill.

The word "month" means calendar month.

Section 1(2) defines the expression "money bill".

Section 1(3) provides:

There shall be endorsed on every Money Bill when it is sent up to the House of Lords and when it is presented to His Majesty for assent the certificate of the Speaker of the House of Commons signed by him that it is a Money Bill. Before giving his certificate the Speaker shall consult, if practicable, two members to be appointed from the Chairmen's Panel at the beginning of each Session by the Committee of Selection.

==== Section 2: Restriction of the powers of the House of Lords as to bills other than money bills ====
This section originally provided that a bill to which this section applied which was rejected by the House of Lords would be presented for royal assent if it was passed by the Commons in three successive sessions, provided that two years had elapsed between second reading of the bill and its final passing in the Commons, notwithstanding that the Lords had not consented to the bill.

Section 1 of the Parliament Act 1949 provides that the Parliament Act 1911 has effect, and is deemed to have had effect from the beginning of the session in which the bill for the Parliament Act 1949 originated (save as regards that bill itself), as though sections 2(1) and (4), of Parliament Act 1911, read as they are printed in the following revised text of section 2 of that act:

(1) If any Public Bill (other than a Money Bill or a Bill containing any provision to extend the maximum duration of Parliament beyond five years) is passed by the House of Commons [in two successive sessions] (whether of the same Parliament or not), and, having been sent up to the House of Lords at least one month before the end of the session, is rejected by the House of Lords in each of those sessions, that Bill shall, on its rejection [for the second time] by the House of Lords, unless the House of Commons direct to the contrary, be presented to His Majesty and become an Act of Parliament on royal assent being signified thereto, notwithstanding that the House of Lords have not consented to the Bill:

Provided that this provision shall not take effect unless [one year has elapsed] between the date of the second reading in the first of those sessions of the Bill in the House of Commons and the date on which it passes the House of Commons [in the second of these sessions.]

(2) When a Bill is presented to His Majesty for assent in pursuance of the provisions of this section, there shall be endorsed on the Bill the certificate of the Speaker of the House of Commons signed by him that the provisions of this section have been duly complied with.

(3) A Bill shall be deemed to be rejected by the House of Lords if it is not passed by the House of Lords either without amendment or with such amendments only as may be agreed to by both Houses.

(4) A Bill shall be deemed to be the same Bill as a former Bill sent up to the House of Lords in the preceding session if, when it is sent up to the House of Lords, it is identical with the former Bill or contains only such alterations as are certified by the Speaker of the House of Commons to be necessary owing to the time which has elapsed since the date of the former Bill, or to represent any amendments which have been made by the House of Lords in the former Bill in the preceding session, and any amendments which are certified by the Speaker to have been made by the House of Lords [in the second session] and agreed to by the House of Commons shall be inserted in the Bill as presented for royal assent in pursuance of this section:

Provided that the House of Commons may, if they think fit, on the passage of such a Bill through the House [in the second session,] suggest any further amendments without inserting the amendments in the Bill, and any such suggested amendments shall be considered by the House of Lords, and, if agreed to by that House, shall be treated as amendments made by the House of Lords and agreed to by the House of Commons; but the exercise of this power by the House of Commons shall not affect the operation of this section in the event of the Bill being rejected by the House of Lords.

The words in square brackets are those substituted by section 1 of the Parliament Act 1949.

Before it was repealed in 1986, the proviso to section 1 of the Parliament Act 1949 read:

Provided that, if a Bill has been rejected for the second time by the House of Lords before the signification of the Royal Assent to the Bill for this Act, whether such rejection was in the same session as that in which the Royal Assent to the Bill for this Act was signified or in an earlier session, the requirement of the said section two that a Bill is to be presented to His Majesty on its rejection for the second time by the House of Lords shall have effect in relation to the Bill rejected as a requirement that it is to be presented to His Majesty as soon as the Royal Assent to the Bill for this Act has been signified, and, notwithstanding that such rejection was in an earlier session, the Royal Assent to the Bill rejected may be signified in the session in which the Royal Assent to the Bill for this Act was signified.

This proviso provided for the application of the Parliament Act 1911 to any bill rejected for the second time by the House of Lords before royal assent was given to the Parliament Act 1949 on 16 December 1949. In a report dated 27 September 1985, the Law Commission and the Scottish Law Commission said that this proviso had never been invoked and was, by that date, incapable of being invoked. They recommended that it be repealed.

==== Section 6: Saving for existing rights and privileges of the House of Commons ====
This section provides:

Nothing in this Act shall diminish or qualify the existing rights and privileges of the House of Commons.

The prime minister, H. H. Asquith, said of the clause that became this section:

That is to enable us still, when the occasion arises, to approve of particular Amendments made by the House of Lords in regard to which this House may waive its privilege.

==== Section 7: Duration of Parliament ====
This section amended the Septennial Act 1715, reducing the maximum duration of any parliament from seven years to five.

The President of the Board of Education, Walter Runciman, said:

The period of five years is chosen with the deliberate object of striking a compromise between, the old triennial Parliament advocated in Chartist days and the seven years' Parliament. Our object in limiting the period to five years is that there may be no risk run of the perils which have been enunciated with great vigour by right hon. and hon. Gentlemen opposite of a Government taking advantage of the powers granted to it under the second Resolution, outliving its welcome, getting completely out of touch with the country, and using its extended period of life, say of six years, for carrying through legislation of which the country does not approve. The five years named in the Resolution will in almost every case mean a four years' Parliament. It means therefore that if a Parliament divided its time in the manner described by the Leader of the Opposition, in the first two years doing the work for which it was returned, and in the second two years looking forward to the election about to come upon it, it would have filled up the whole of the four years' period for which this Resolution provides. Our only object in limiting the period of the duration of Parliament is that the House of Commons shall not get out of touch with the opinion of the electorate.

This section was repealed by the Fixed-term Parliaments Act 2011 for the United Kingdom on 15 September 2011, when parliament was given a fixed five-year term.

=== Result ===
The Lords continued to suggest amendments to money bills over which it had no right of veto; and in several instances these were accepted by the Commons. These included the China Indemnity Bill 1925 and the Inshore Fishing Industry Bill 1947. The use of the Lords' now temporary veto remains a powerful check on legislation.

It was used in relation to the Government of Ireland Act 1914, which had been under the threat of a Lords veto, now removed. Ulster Protestants had been firmly against the passing of the bill. However, the Government of Ireland Act 1914 never came into force because of the outbreak of the First World War. Amendments to the Parliament Act 1911 were made to prolong the life of the 1910 parliament following the outbreak of the First World War, and also that of the 1935 parliament due to the Second World War. These made special exemptions to the requirement to hold a general election every five years.

Legislation passed without the consent of the Lords, under the provisions of the Parliament Act, is still considered primary legislation, i.e. a fully valid act of Parliament. The importance of this was highlighted in Jackson v Attorney General, (Note: Jackson v Attorney General, UKHL 56, [2005] 4 All ER 1253.) in which the lawfulness of the Parliament Act 1949 was questioned. The challenge asserted that the Parliament Act 1911 had delegated power from Parliament as a whole to the Commons, and that the Parliament Act 1949 was therefore delegated rather than primary legislation. If this were the case, then the House of Commons could not further increase its own powers through the Parliament Act 1949 without direct permission from the House of Lords. Since it was passed under the 1911 act, the 1949 act had never received the required consent of the Lords. However, the Judicial Committee of the House of Lords found that the 1911 act was not primarily about empowering the Commons, but rather had the purpose of restricting the ability of the Lords to reject legislation, i.e. altering the process by which Parliament as a whole enacts legislation. The 1949 act had therefore been lawfully enacted. This ruling also appears to mean that efforts to abolish the House of Lords (a major constitutional change) by using the act could be successful, although the issue was not directly addressed in the ruling.

=== Analysis ===
The Parliament Act 1911 can be seen in the context of the British constitution: rather than creating a written constitution, Parliament chose instead to legislate through the usual channels in response to the crisis. This was a pragmatic response, which avoided the further problems of codifying unwritten rules and reconstructing the entire government. It is commonly considered a statute of "constitutional importance", which gives it informal priority in Parliament and in the courts with regard to whether later legislation can change it and the process by which this may happen.

It is also mentioned in discussion of constitutional convention. While it replaced conventions regarding the role of the House of Lords, it also relies on several others. Section 1(1) only makes sense if money bills do not arise in the House of Lords, and the provisions in section 2(1) only if proceedings on a public bill are completed in a single session, otherwise they must fail and be put through procedure again.

=== Repeal in the Republic of Ireland ===
This act was repealed for the Republic of Ireland on 16 May 1983 by section 1 of, and Part IV of the Schedule to, the Statute Law Revision Act 1983 (No.11).

== Parliament Act 1949 ==
Parliament Act 1949 (Note: Section 2(1).)
- Act of Parliament
- Parliament of the United Kingdom
- Long title: An Act to amend the Parliament Act 1911.
- Citation: 12, 13 & 14 Geo. 6. c. 103
- Territorial extent: United Kingdom

Dates
- Royal assent: 16 December 1949
- Commencement: 16 December 1949
Other legislation
Amends	Parliament Act 1911
Amended by	Statute Law (Repeals) Act 1986

Status: Amended

Text of statute as originally enacted

Text of the Parliament Acts 1911 and 1949 as in force today (including any amendments) within the United Kingdom, from legislation.gov.uk.

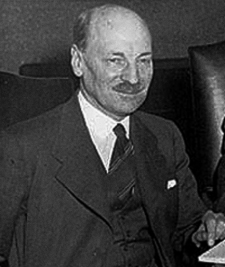
Clement Attlee

The Parliament Act 1949 (12, 13 & 14 Geo. 6. c. 103) is an act of the Parliament of the United Kingdom. It reduced the power of the House of Lords to delay certain types of legislation – specifically public bills other than money bills – by amending the 1911 act (1 & 2 Geo. 5. c. 13).

Immediately after the Second World War, the Labour government of Clement Attlee decided to amend the 1911 act to reduce further the power of the Lords, as a result of their fears that their radical programme of nationalisation would be delayed by the Lords and hence would not be completed within the life of the parliament.

Following the Labour Party's election in 1945, Attlee's government was worried that the Lords would delay their nationalisation programme. In particular, they feared that peers would reject the Iron and Steel Bill. To resolve the issue, the Commons passed the Parliament Bill in 1947, but it took until December 1949 for the law to be given royal assent under the provisions of the Parliament Act 1911. This act is interpreted as one with the Parliament Act 1911, and the two acts may be cited together as the "Parliament Acts 1911 and 1949".

The House of Lords did not interfere with nationalisations in 1945 or 1946, but it was feared that the proposed nationalisation of the iron and steel industry would be a bridge too far, so a bill was introduced in 1947 to reduce the time that the Lords could delay bills, from three sessions over two years to two sessions over one year. The Lords attempted to block this change. The bill was reintroduced in 1948 and again in 1949, before the 1911 act was finally used to force it through. Since the 1911 act required a delay over three "sessions", a special short "session" of Parliament was introduced in 1948, with a King's Speech on 14 September 1948, and prorogation on 25 October.

The 1949 act amended the 1911 act, reducing this delay to a single year. Section 2 defined the act's short title as the "Parliament Act 1949" and stated that the Parliament Acts 1911 and 1949 should be construed together as one under that name.

The amended Parliament Act was never used in the 1940s or 1950s, possibly because the mere threat of it was enough. The Salisbury convention that the Lords would not block government bills that were mentioned in the government's manifesto dates from this time. Salisbury believed that since, in being returned to power, the Government was given a clear mandate for the policies proposed in its manifesto, it would be improper for the Lords to frustrate such legislation.

In every bill presented to the sovereign under sections 1 to 3 of the Parliament Act 1911 (as amended) the words of enactment are:

BE IT ENACTED by The King's most Excellent Majesty, by and with the advice and consent of the Commons in this present Parliament assembled, in accordance with the provisions of the Parliament Acts 1911 and 1949, and by the authority of the same, as follows

The usual enacting formula, used on other acts, also refers to the advice and consent of the Lords Spiritual and Temporal, and omits the reference to the Parliament Acts.

=== Legal challenge ===
In Jackson v Attorney General, (Note: [2005] UKHL 56, [2005] 4 All ER 1253.) the validity of the Parliament Act 1949 was questioned because it used the 1911 act to ensure its passage. The challenge asserted that the 1949 act was delegated rather than primary legislation, and that the 1911 act had delegated power to the Commons. If this were the case, then the Commons could not empower itself through the 1949 act without direct permission from the Lords. Since it was passed under the 1911 act, it had never received the required consent of the Lords. However, the 1949 act was found to be legal. It was concluded that the 1911 act was not primarily about empowering the Commons, but rather was about restricting the ability of the Lords to affect legislation. This ruling also meant that efforts to abolish the House of Lords using the acts could be successful, although the issue was not directly addressed in the ruling.

== Use of the Parliament Acts ==
The original form of the 1911 act was used three times. These were:

1. Government of Ireland Act 1914, which would have established a Home Rule government in Ireland; its implementation was blocked due to the First World War.
2. Welsh Church Act 1914, under which the Welsh part of the Church of England was disestablished in 1920, becoming the Church in Wales.
3. Parliament Act 1949, which amended the Parliament Act 1911 (discussed above).

The amended form of the 1911 act has been used four times. These were:

1. War Crimes Act 1991, which extended jurisdiction of UK courts to acts committed on behalf of Nazi Germany during the Second World War (the only time – to date – that the Parliament Acts have been used by a Conservative government).
2. European Parliamentary Elections Act 1999, which changed the system of elections to the European Parliament from first past the post to a form of proportional representation.
3. Sexual Offences (Amendment) Act 2000, which equalised the age of consent for male homosexual sexual activities with that for heterosexual and female homosexual sexual activities at 16.
4. Hunting Act 2004, which prohibited hare coursing and (subject to some exceptions) all hunting of wild mammals (particularly foxes) with dogs after early 2005.

The Welsh Church Act and the Government of Ireland Act were both given royal assent on the same day as the Suspensory Act 1914, which meant that neither would come into force until after the War.

After the Labour government came to power in 1997, there was repeated speculation that it would rely on the Parliament Acts to reverse a check from the Lords, but it did not prove necessary. The Parliament Acts were not required to enact, for example, the Criminal Justice (Mode of Trial) (No 2) Bill in 2000 (which originally proposed to give magistrates, not defendants, the choice of where an "either way" offence would be tried) because the government abandoned the bill after a wrecking amendment in the House of Lords. The Parliament Act was threatened to be used to get the Identity Cards Act 2006 passed through the Lords. This was backed up by a threat of an immediate introduction of a compulsory ID Card scheme. The Lords had no option but to accept a compromise of a delay in the introduction of the scheme. The Parliament Acts cannot be used to force through legislation that originated in the House of Lords, so they could not have been used to enact the Civil Partnerships Act 2004 or the Constitutional Reform Act 2005.

The first three measures for which the act has been used since 1949 were not mentioned in manifestos, and hence in trying to veto them the Lords were not breaking the Salisbury convention. The Hunting Bill was mentioned in the Labour Party manifesto for the 2001 general election, so, depending upon how the convention is interpreted, the attempt to block it could be taken as a breach. However, as conventions are merely convention and not law, the House of Lords would not be taking illegal action if they were to act otherwise.

The Government of Ireland Act 1914 was repealed in entirety by the Government of Ireland Act 1920, the European Parliamentary Elections Act 1999 was repealed in entirety by the European Parliamentary Elections Act 2002 and most provisions of the Sexual Offences (Amendment) Act 2000 were repealed by the Sexual Offences Act 2003. While the War Crimes Act 1991 remains in force, to date only Anthony Sawoniuk has been convicted under it.

The threat of the Parliament Acts has been employed by several British governments to force the Lords to accept its legislation. In at least three cases, the procedure authorised by the Parliament Act 1911, or by the Parliament Acts 1911 and 1949, was started, but the legislation was approved by the House of Lords as a result of the government making concessions. These were:

1. Temperance (Scotland) Act 1913, which allowed the voters in a district to hold a poll to vote on whether their district went "dry" or remained "wet".
2. Trade Union and Labour Relations (Amendment) Act 1976, which amended the Trade Union and Labour Relations Act 1974 to reverse changes made to that Act as it passed through Parliament.
3. Aircraft and Shipbuilding Industries Act 1977, which nationalised large parts of the UK aerospace and shipbuilding industries and established two corporations, British Aerospace and British Shipbuilders.

== Validity of the 1949 act ==
Since the 1949 act became law, doubts were raised by some legal academics as to whether the use of the 1911 act to pass the 1949 act, which amended the 1911 Act itself, was valid. Three main concerns were raised:

- The continued ability of the House of Lords to veto a bill to prolong the life of Parliament would not be entrenched if the 1911 act could be used to amend itself first, removing this restriction.
- The 1949 act could be considered to be secondary legislation, since it depended for its validity on another act, the 1911 act; and the principle that courts will respect an act of Parliament without enquiring into its origins (an emanation of parliamentary sovereignty) would not apply.
- Under the 1911 act, Parliament (that is, the Commons and the Lords acting together) delegated its ability to pass legislation to another body (the Commons alone). Following legal principles established when the United Kingdom granted legislative powers to assemblies in its colonies in the late 18th century, a subordinate legislative body cannot use the act under which legislative power was delegated to it to expand its competence without an express power to do so in the enabling act (see Declaratory Act).

To address these concerns, a Law Lord, Lord Donaldson of Lymington, presented a private member's bill in House of Lords in the 2000–2001 session of Parliament (the Parliament Acts (Amendment) Bill), which would have had the effect of confirming the legitimacy of the 1949 act, but prohibiting any further such uses of the Parliament Act to amend itself, or use of it to further modify or curtail the powers of the House of Lords. Another Parliament Acts (Amendment) Bill was introduced independently by Lord Renton of Mount Harry in the next session, but neither of these bills proceeded to a third reading.

The first legal challenge to the 1949 act is believed to have been made during the first prosecution for war crimes under the War Crimes Act 1991, R v Serafinowicz, but (according to the Court of Appeal in R (Jackson) v Attorney General) no record of the legal arguments remains. Because a second defendant was successfully prosecuted under the War Crimes Act and sentenced to life imprisonment, and since the War Crimes Act was later amended by both two further acts (the Criminal Justice and Public Order Act 1994 and the Criminal Procedure and Investigations Act 1996), which were passed by both Houses and received royal assent, the validity of the War Crimes Act is not under question.

The 1949 act and the validity of acts made under it were not questioned in court again until the Parliament Acts were used to pass the Hunting Act 2004. Early in 2005, the Countryside Alliance took a case to court to challenge the validity of the 1949 act. In the High Court, the wording of the 1911 act was held not to imply any entrenchment. Support for this conclusion can be drawn from the parliamentary debates on the 1911 act, in which an entrenchment clause was considered but rejected, the government clearly displaying the intention to be able to make such amendments if necessary. However, the 2005 decision was made on other grounds, so the question of whether the courts could refer to the 1949 act's parliamentary debates under the principle established in Pepper v Hart was not decided.

The High Court held that the 1949 act was primary legislation, despite being unusual in that the courts can rule on whether the provisions of the 1911 act are complied with. It was held that the 1911 act clearly permits the procedures specified in the Parliament Acts to be used for "any Public Bill", and this was sufficient to dispose of the argument that the 1911 act could not be used to amend itself. The court took the view that the 1911 Act was a 'remodelling' of the constitution rather than a delegation of power.

The subsequent Court of Appeal ruling agreed that the 1949 act itself was valid, but left open the question of whether the Commons could use the Parliament Act to make significant changes to the constitution (for example, repealing the Parliament Act's provision prohibiting the act from being used to extend the lifespan of Parliament). The Court of Appeal refused to give the Countryside Alliance permission to appeal their decision to the House of Lords; however, a petition for permission to appeal was submitted directly to the Law Lords and granted in July 2005. Argument in the case was heard on 13 and 14 July 2005 by a large committee of nine Law Lords, rather than the normal five. In a unanimous decision, the Law Lords upheld the validity of 1949 Act.

== Future developments ==
After the "first stage" of reform of the House of Lords was implemented in the House of Lords Act 1999, the Wakeham Royal Commission on the proposal of a "second stage" of reform reported in January 2000. Subsequently, the government decided to take no action to change the legislative relationship between the House of Commons and the House of Lords.

In March 2006, it was reported that the then-Labour Government was considering removing the ability of the Lords to delay legislation that arises as a result of manifesto commitments (while the Lords still acted in accordance with a self-imposed restriction, the Salisbury Convention, which this legislation would have merely formalised), and reducing their ability to delay other legislation to a period of 60 days (although a compromise of 6 months has also been suggested). The Labour Government made no attempt to enact such changes before the 2010 general election, which Labour lost.

In May 2011, Deputy Prime Minister Nick Clegg announced the Coalition Government's plans to legislate for a mainly elected House of Lords in the House of Lords Reform Bill 2012. In the face of fierce opposition from the overwhelming majority of the Lords, he indicated that he would consider use of the Parliament Act. Ultimately this did not happen, as the bill was withdrawn.

== See also ==
- List of acts of the Parliament of the United Kingdom enacted without the House of Lords' consent

== Bibliography ==
- Barnett, Hilaire (2002). Constitutional and Administrative Law (3rd ed.). London: Cavendish Pub Ltd. ISBN 978-1-85941-721-8.
- Barnett, Hilaire; Jago, Robert (2011). Constitutional & Administrative Law (8th ed.). New York: Taylor & Francis. ISBN 978-0-415-57881-3.
- Bradley, A.W.; Ewing, K.D. (2007). Constitutional and Administrative Law (14th ed.). Harlow, UK: Longman. ISBN 978-1-4058-1207-8.
- Ensor, R.C.K. (1952). England 1870–1914. The Oxford History of England. Oxford: Clarendon Press. OCLC 5079147.
- Jackson, Paul; Leopold, Patricia (2001). O. Hood Phillips & Jackson: Constitutional and Administrative Law (8th ed.). London: Sweet and Maxwell. ISBN 978-0-421-57480-9.
- Keir, David L. (1938). The Constitutional History of Modern Britain. London: A & C Black. OCLC 463283191.
- Magnus, Philip (1964), King Edward the Seventh, London: John Murray, ISBN 978-0140026580
- McKechnie, William Sharp, 1909: The Reform of the House of Lords
