= War Crimes Act 1991 =

Act of the Parliament of the United Kingdom

War Crimes Act 1991 (Note: Section 3(1).)
- Act of Parliament
- Parliament of the United Kingdom
- Long title: An Act to confer jurisdiction on United Kingdom courts in respect of certain grave violations of the laws and customs of war committed in German-held territory during the Second World War; and for connected purposes.
- Citation: 1991 c. 13
- Territorial extent: United Kingdom (Note: Section 3(5).)

Dates
- Royal assent: 9 May 1991
- Commencement: 9 May 1991 (Note: Section 4(b) of the Interpretation Act 1978. Section 1(4) and the Schedule were to come into force on a day appointed by the Secretary of State by order (section 3(4)).)
Other legislation
Amends	Legal Aid Act 1988; Legal Aid, Advice and Assistance (Northern Ireland) Order 1981
Amended by	Criminal Justice and Public Order Act 1994; Criminal Procedure and Investigations Act 1996; Greater London Authority Act 1999; Constitutional Reform Act 2005; Police Reform and Social Responsibility Act 2011

Status: Amended

Text of statute as originally enacted

Revised text of statute as amended

Text of the War Crimes Act 1991 as in force today (including any amendments) within the United Kingdom, from legislation.gov.uk.

The War Crimes Act 1991 (c. 13) is an act of the Parliament of the United Kingdom. It confers jurisdiction on courts in the United Kingdom to try people for war crimes committed in Nazi Germany or German-occupied territory during the Second World War by people who were not British citizens at the time but have since become British citizens or residents. The legislation was enacted as there were no provisions to allow the extradition of British residents or naturalised citizens to face trial for war crimes in third countries at the time. Other countries, such as the United States, have used civil rather than criminal proceedings to resolve this issue by revoking citizenship of suspects, therefore facilitating their deportation.

== Provisions ==
Section 1 of the act provides that proceedings for murder, manslaughter or culpable homicide may be brought against a person in the United Kingdom irrespective of his nationality at the time of the alleged offence, if the offence was committed between 1 September 1939 and 5 June 1945 in a place which was then part of Germany or under German occupation, and constituted a violation of the laws and customs of war. No proceedings may be brought unless the person was on 8 March 1990, or has since become, a British citizen or resident in the United Kingdom, the Isle of Man or any of the Channel Islands. In England and Wales and in Northern Ireland, proceedings may be brought only by or with the consent of the Attorney General or, as the case may be, the Attorney General for Northern Ireland.

Section 1(4) and the schedule, which were not in force when the act received royal assent, provided a procedure to be used instead of committal proceedings where a person was charged in England, Wales or Northern Ireland with such an offence. Where the Attorney General or the Director of Public Prosecutions considered that the evidence would be sufficient for committal for trial but revealed a case of such complexity that it should be taken over by the Crown Court without delay, a notice of transfer could be served on the magistrates' court.

Section 2 of the act provides for sums to be paid out of money provided by Parliament in respect of expenditure on the investigation of such offences by officers of the Metropolitan Police, and for any increase in sums payable under other acts that is attributable to the act. Section 3 of the act provides the short title and made consequential amendments to the Legal Aid Act 1988 and the Legal Aid, Advice and Assistance (Northern Ireland) Order 1981 for cases in which a notice of transfer had been given. It provides that section 1(4) and the schedule were to come into force on a day appointed by order, extends the act to Northern Ireland, and allows the act to be extended by Order in Council, with exceptions and modifications, to the Isle of Man, the Channel Islands and any colony.

== Passage ==
The act was rejected by the House of Lords, and so it was passed with the authority of only the House of Commons under the provisions of the Parliament Acts 1911 and 1949 (1 & 2 Geo. 5. c. 13 and 12, 13 & 14 Geo. 6. c. 103). The Parliament Acts are rarely invoked: the War Crimes Act was only the fourth statute since 1911 enacted under their provisions, and the first since the Parliament Act 1949 (12, 13 & 14 Geo. 6. c. 103). The War Crimes Act remains the only time that the Parliament Acts were invoked by a Conservative government.

== Prosecutions ==
To date only one person, Anthony Sawoniuk, has been convicted under the act. In 1999, he was sentenced to life imprisonment for murder during his involvement with the collaborationist Belarusian Auxiliary Police. He died in jail in 2005.

The first person to be charged, however, was fellow Belarusian officer, Szymon Serafinowicz Sr, grandfather of the British actor Peter Serafinowicz. His trial commenced in 1997 for the murder of three unnamed Jews committed as during his role as police chief in Mir. At this stage, he was in the advanced stages of dementia and was declared medically unfit. He died later that year.

== Subsequent developments ==
Section 1(4) was repealed, and the procedure in lieu of committal in the schedule was repealed in its entirety, by the Criminal Procedure and Investigations Act 1996, with effect from 4 July 1996. The same act repealed the consequential amendments to legal aid in section 3(2) and (3).

Section 2(a) was amended to replace the reference to the Receiver for the Metropolitan Police District with a reference to the Mayor's Office for Policing and Crime, by the Police Reform and Social Responsibility Act 2011, with effect from 16 January 2012.
