= Suspensory Act 1914 =

Act of the Parliament of the United Kingdom

Suspensory Act 1914 (Note: Section 2.)
- Act of Parliament
- Parliament of the United Kingdom
- Long title: An Act to suspend the operation of the Government of Ireland Act, 1914, and the Welsh Church Act, 1914.
- Citation: 4 & 5 Geo. 5. c. 88
- Territorial extent: United Kingdom

Dates
- Royal assent: 18 September 1914
- Commencement: 18 September 1914 (Note: The Acts of Parliament (Commencement) Act 1793.)
- Repealed: 22 December 1927
Other legislation
Amends	Government of Ireland Act 1914
Repealed by	Statute Law Revision Act 1927
Relates to	Government of Ireland Act 1914; Welsh Church Act 1914

Status: Repealed

Text of statute as originally enacted

The Suspensory Act 1914 (4 & 5 Geo. 5. c. 88) was an act of the Parliament of the United Kingdom which suspended the coming into force of two other acts: the Welsh Church Act 1914 (for the disestablishment of the Church of England in Wales), and the Government of Ireland Act 1914 (Third Home Rule Bill for Ireland). The act received royal assent on the same day as the two acts it suspended, on 18 September 1914.

== Background ==
Welsh disestablishment and Irish home rule were both major policies of H. H. Asquith's Liberal government that had met with considerable controversy and parliamentary opposition in the 1910s. By the summer of 1914, however, the enactment of both measures seemed inevitable as the provisions set out by the Parliament Act 1911 (1 & 2 Geo. 5. c. 13) had been met, allowing the government to force them through, despite the opposition of the House of Lords, if it so chose.

Upon the outbreak of war with Germany, the government had agreed a "political truce" with the opposition Conservative leader, Bonar Law. Asquith decided, however, that the two controversial bills should nevertheless be put to the King, together with a new bill suspending their operation; this prompted Law to lead a Unionist walk-out from the House of Commons.

All three bills received royal assent on the same day, 18 September.

== Effect of the Suspensory Act 1914 ==
A short act with only one substantive section, the act provided that "no steps shall be taken to put the Government of Ireland Act into operation ... until the expiration of twelve months ... or if the present war has not ended, until such later date ... as may be fixed", and that the "date of disestablishment" as defined by the Welsh Church Act 1914 would be postponed, until 18 September 1915; if the war were still under way at that time, the government were empowered to push the two acts' suspension further back.

On 14 September 1915 an Order in Council made under the act suspended the Government of Ireland Act 1914 (4 & 5 Geo. 5. c. 90) for a further six months (i.e. until 18 March 1916), and postponed Welsh disestablishment until the end of the war. A subsequent series of Orders in Council, dated 29 February 1916, 7 September 1916, 13 March 1917, 22 August 1917, 27 February 1918, 4 September 1918, 12 March 1919, 18 August 1919, 2 March 1920, and 13 August 1920 suspended the 1914 act in further blocks of six months until it was repealed by the Government of Ireland Act 1920 (10 & 11 Geo. 5. c. 67), which came into force on 23 December 1920. However, the 1920 act was never fully implemented either, due to the Irish War of Independence (culminating in the independence from the United Kingdom of most of Ireland as the Irish Free State); home rule was only established in Northern Ireland.

Welsh disestablishment was further postponed by the Welsh Church (Temporalities) Act 1919 (9 & 10 Geo. 5. c. 65) until 31 March 1920, when it finally went ahead.

== Subsequent developments ==
The whole act was repealed by section 1 of, and the part I of the schedule to, the Statute Law Revision Act 1927 (17 & 18 Geo. 5. c. 42), which came into force on 22 December 1927.
