= Alvin Jackson (historian) =

British historian

Alvin Jackson FBA is an Irish and British historian. He serves as the Richard Lodge Professor of History at the University of Edinburgh. His work focuses on Unionism and Home Rule in the history of Ireland and Britain.

Jackson was elected a Fellow of the British Academy in 2024.

In 2026, Jackson was appointed the first Childers Professor of Irish History at Cambridge University.

== Works ==
- Jackson, Alvin (1999). Ireland: 1798–1998. Wiley. ISBN 9780631195429.
- Jackson, Alvin (2003). Home Rule: An Irish History, 1800-2000. Oxford: Oxford University Press. ISBN 9780195220483.
- Jackson, Alvin (2012). The Two Unions: Ireland, Scotland, and the Survival of the United Kingdom, 1707-2007. Oxford: Oxford University Press. ISBN 9780199593996.
- Jackson, Alvin (2014). The Oxford Handbook of Modern Irish History. Oxford: Oxford University Press. ISBN 9780199549344.
- Jackson, Alvin (2023). United kingdoms: multinational union kingdoms in Europe and beyond. Oxford University Press. ISBN 9780192883742.
