= Government of Ireland Bill =

The Government of Ireland Bill may refer to

- Government of Ireland Bill 1886
- Government of Ireland Bill 1893
- Government of Ireland Bill 1914
- Government of Ireland Bill 1920
