= Unionism in Ireland =

Political ideology

Hazards of separation from Great Britain. Unionist postcard opposing Irish home rule, 1912.

Unionism in Ireland is a political tradition that professes loyalty to the crown of the United Kingdom and to the union it represents with England, Scotland and Wales. The overwhelming sentiment of Ireland's Protestant minority, unionism mobilised in the decades following Catholic Emancipation in 1829 to oppose restoration of a separate Irish parliament. Since Partition in 1921, its goal has been to retain Northern Ireland as a devolved region within the United Kingdom and to resist the prospect of an all-Ireland republic. Within the framework of the 1998 Belfast Agreement, which concluded three decades of political violence, unionists have shared office with Irish nationalists in a reformed Northern Ireland Assembly. Since February 2024, they no longer do so as the larger faction: they serve in an executive with an Irish republican (Sinn Féin) First Minister.

Unionism became an overarching partisan affiliation in Ireland late in the nineteenth century. Typically Presbyterian agrarian-reform Liberals coalesced with traditionally Anglican, Orange Order allied, Conservatives against the Irish Home Rule Bills of 1886 and 1893. Joined by loyalist labour, on the eve of World War I this broad opposition to Irish self-government concentrated in Belfast and its hinterlands as Ulster unionism and prepared an armed resistance—the Ulster Volunteers.

Within the partition settlement of 1921–22 by which the rest of Ireland attained separate statehood, Ulster unionists accepted a home rule dispensation for the six of nine Ulster counties remaining in the United Kingdom. For the next 50 years, the Ulster Unionist Party exercised the devolved powers of the Northern Ireland Parliament with little domestic opposition and outside of the governing party-political system at Westminster.

In 1972, the British government suspended this arrangement. Against a background of growing political violence, and citing the need to consider how Catholics in Northern Ireland could be integrated into its civic and political life, it prorogued the parliament in Belfast.

Over the ensuing three decades of The Troubles, unionists divided in their responses to power-sharing proposals presented, in consultation with the Republic of Ireland, by successive British governments. Following the 1998 Belfast Agreement, under which both republican and loyalist paramilitaries committed to permanent ceasefires, unionists accepted principles of joint office and parallel consent in a new Northern Ireland legislative Assembly and executive.

Renegotiated in 2006, relations within this consociational arrangement remained fraught. Unionists, with diminishing electoral strength, charged their nationalist partners in government with pursuing an anti-British cultural agenda and, post-Brexit, with supporting a trade regime, the Northern Ireland Protocol, that advances an all-Ireland agenda. In February 2024, two years after their withdrawal collapsed the devolved institutions, on the basis of new British government assurances they returned to the Assembly to form the first Northern Ireland government in which unionists are a minority.

== Irish Unionism 1800–1904 ==
=== The Act of Union 1800 ===
Detail of the Battle of Ballynahinch 1798 by Thomas Robinson. Government Yeomanry prepare to hang United Irish insurgent.

In the last decades of the Kingdom of Ireland (1542–1800), Protestants in public life advanced themselves as Irish Patriots. The focus of their patriotism was the Parliament in Dublin. Confined on a narrow franchise to landed members of the established Anglican communion (the Anglo-Irish "Protestant Ascendancy"), the parliament denied equal protection and public office to Dissenters (non-Anglican Protestants) and to the Kingdom's dispossessed Roman Catholic majority. The high point of this parliamentary patriotism was the formation during the American War of Independence of the Irish Volunteers and, as that militia paraded in Dublin, the securing in 1782 of the parliament's legislative independence from the British government in London.

In the north-east, combinations of Presbyterian tradesmen, merchants, and tenant farmers protested against the unrepresentative parliament and against an executive in Dublin Castle still appointed, through the office of the Lord Lieutenant, by English ministers. Seeing little prospect of further reform and in the hope that they might be assisted by republican France, these United Irishmen sought a revolutionary union of "Catholic, Protestant and Dissenter" (i.e. of Catholics and Protestants of all persuasions). Their resolve was broken with the defeat of their uprising in 1798, and by reports of rebel outrages against Protestant Loyalists in the south.

The British government, which had had to deploy its own forces to suppress the rebellion in Ireland and to turn back and defeat French intervention, decided on a union with Great Britain. Provision for Catholic emancipation was dropped from the Act of Union pushed with difficulty through the parliament in Dublin. While a separate Irish executive in Dublin was retained, representation, still wholly Protestant, was transferred to Westminster.

In the Presbyterian north east, the Irish Parliament was unlamented. Having refused calls for reform—to broaden representation and curb corruption—few saw cause to regret its passing.

=== Catholic emancipation and "Protestant unity" ===
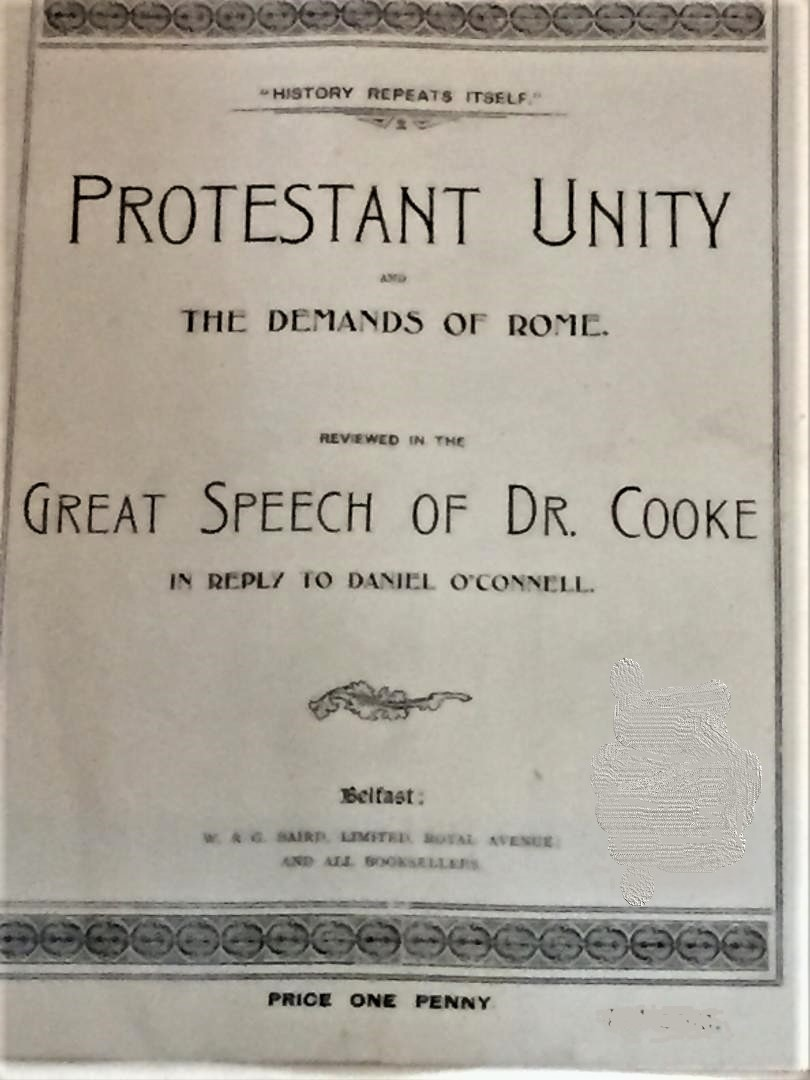
1899 penny print of Henry Cooke's 1841 speech in "reply to Daniel O'Connell"

It took the Union thirty years to deliver on the promise of Catholic emancipation (1829)—to admit Catholics to the Westminster Parliament—and permit an erosion of the Protestant monopoly on position and influence. An opportunity to integrate Catholics through their re-emerging propertied and professional classes as a minority within the United Kingdom may have passed. In 1830, the leader of the Catholic Association, Daniel O'Connell, invited Protestants to join in a campaign to repeal the Union and restore the Kingdom of Ireland under the Constitution of 1782.

At the same time, the security in Ireland for emancipation was a fivefold increase in the threshold for the property franchise, cutting the Irish electorate from 215,000 to 40,000. O'Connell's Protestant ally in the north, George Ensor, observed that this broke the link between Catholic inclusion and democratic reform.

In Ulster, resistance to O'Connell's appeal was stiffened by a religious revival. With its emphasis upon "personal witness", the New Reformation appeared to transcend the ecclesiastical differences between the Protestant denominations. while launching them into "a far more conscious sense of separateness from the Church of Rome", then undergoing its own devotional revolution. The leading Presbyterian evangelist, Henry Cooke took the occasion, at a large Conservative gathering in Hillsborough, to propose a "Christian marriage" between the two main Protestant denominations (Anglican and Presbyterian). Setting their remaining differences aside, they should cooperate on all "matters of common safety".

Presbyterian voters continued to favour reform-minded Whigs or, as they later emerged, tenant-right and free-trade Liberals, over the Conservative and Orange-Order candidates of the landed Ascendancy. But, in the decades after the Great Famine, as the Irish party-political successors to O'Connell's Repeal movement gained representation and influence in Westminster, Cooke's call for unity was to be heeded in the progressive emergence of a pan-Protestant unionism.

=== The Irish party challenge at Westminster and the Land War ===
William Gladstone writing legislation under pressure from the Land League. Caricature 1881.

The Reform Act 1867 produced in Britain an electorate that no longer identified instinctively with the conservative interest in Ireland and was more open to the "home-rule" compromise that nationalists now presented. Ireland would remain within the United Kingdom but with a parliament in Dublin exercising powers devolved from Westminster. Meanwhile, in Ireland, a combination of the secret ballot and increased representation for the towns, reduced the electoral influence of land owners and their agents, and contributed to the triumph, in 1874, of the Home Rule League. Fifty-nine members were returned to Westminster where they sat as the Irish Parliamentary Party (IPP).

In his first ministry (1868–1874), the Liberal premier William Ewart Gladstone had attempted conciliation. In 1869, he disestablished the Church of Ireland, and in 1870 introduced the Landlord and Tenant (Ireland) Act. In both measures conservative jurists identified threats to the integrity of the union. Disestablishment reneged on the promise of "one Protestant Episcopal Church" for both Britain and Ireland under Article V of the Act of Union (the Ulster Protestant Defence Association claimed breach of contract), and weak as they were, provisions for tenant compensation and purchase created a separate agrarian regime for Ireland at odds with the prevailing English conception of property rights.

In the Long Depression of the 1870s the Land War intensified. From 1879 it was organised by the direct-action Irish National Land League, led by the leader of the IPP, the southern Protestant Charles Stewart Parnell. In 1881, in a further Land Act, Gladstone conceded the three F's—fair rent, free sale, and fixity of tenure. Recognising that "the land grievance had been a bond of discontent between Ulster and the rest of Ireland and in that sense a danger to the union", Irish Conservatives did not oppose the measure. Protestants in the eastern counties had admitted to the leadership of the tenant-right movement men, like the Rev. James Armour of Ballymoney, who were at best agnostic on the union, while in the west of the province even Orangemen had started joining the Land League.

The final and decisive shift in favour of constitutional concessions came in the wake of the Representation of the People Act 1884. The near-universal admission to the suffrage of male heads of household tripled the electorate in Ireland. The 1885 election returned an IPP, now under the leadership of Parnell, of 85 Members (including 17 from Ulster where Conservatives and Liberals split the unionist vote).Gladstone, whose Liberals lost all 15 of their Irish seats, was able to form his second ministry only with their Commons support.

=== Reaction to Gladstone's Home Rule Bills ===
God Save the Queen, Erin Go Bragh, Ulster Unionist Convention, Belfast, 1892

In June 1886, Gladstone tabled a The Government of Ireland Bill that was largely of his own drafting. Unionists were not persuaded by his inclusion of measures to limit the remit of a Dublin legislature and to reduce the weight of the popular vote. Regardless of how it was constituted, they believed that an Irish parliament (egged on by the "American Irish") would enter into conflicts with the "imperial parliament" in London that could only be resolved through "complete separation".

The upper and middle classes found in Britain and the Empire "a wide range of profitable careers--in the army, in the public services, in commerce--from which they might be shut out if the link between Ireland and Great Britain were weakened or severed". That same link was critical for all those employed in the great export industries of the North—textiles, engineering, shipbuilding. For these the Irish hinterland was less important than the industrial triangle that linked Belfast and region with Clydeside and the north of England. Yet the most popular summary of case against Irish self-government remained the message broadcast in a "great revival" of the Orange Order — "Home Rule means Rome Rule".

In the north, the competition represented by the growing numbers of Catholics arriving at mill and factory gates had already given the once largely rural Orange Order a new lease among Protestant workers. The pattern, in itself, was not unique to Belfast and its satellites. Glasgow, Manchester, Liverpool and other British centres experiencing large-scale Irish immigration developed similar Orange and nativist ward and workplace politics with which unionists—organised in the Loyalist Anti-Repeal Union—sought to connect. With Gladstone's conversion to home rule, politicians who had held aloof from the Order now embraced its militancy. Colonel Edward Saunderson, who had represented Cavan as a Liberal, donned an Orange sash "because", he said "the Orange society is alone capable of dealing with the condition of anarchy and rebellion which prevail in Ireland".

In February 1886, playing, in his own words, the "Orange card", Lord Randolph Churchill assured a "monster meeting" of the Anti-Repeal Union in Belfast, that English Conservatives would "cast in their lot" with loyalists in resisting Home Rule, and he later coined the phrase that was to become the watchword of northern unionism: "Ulster will fight, and Ulster will be right".

Gladstone's own party was split on Home Rule and the House divided against the measure. In 1891 Ulster's Liberal Unionists, part of a larger Liberal break with Gladstone, entered Saunderson's Irish Unionist Alliance, and at Westminster took the Conservative whip.

In 1892, despite bitter division over the personally compromised leadership of Parnell, the Nationalists were able to help Gladstone to a third ministry. The result was a second Home Rule bill. A great Ulster Unionist Convention was held in Belfast organised by the Liberal Unionist Thomas Sinclair, whom the press noted had been a critic of Orangeism. Speakers and observers dwelt on the diversity of creed, class and party represented among the 12,300 delegates attending. As reported by the Northern Whig there were "the old tenant-righters of the 'sixties' ... the sturdy reformers of Antrim ... the Unitarians of Down, always progressive in their politics ... the old-fashioned Tories of the Counties ... modern Conservatives ... Orangemen ... All these various elements—Whig, Liberal, Radical, Presbyterian, Episcopalian, Unitarian and Methodist ... united as one man."

While references to Catholics were conciliatory the Convention resolved:

to retain unchanged our present position as an integral portion of the United Kingdom, and protest in the most unequivocal manner against the passage of any measure that would rob us of our inheritance in the Imperial Parliament, under the protection of which our capital has been invested and our home and rights safeguarded; that we record our determination to have nothing to do with a Parliament certain to be controlled by men responsible for the crime and outrage of the Land League . . . many of whom have shown themselves the ready instrument of clerical domination.

After mammoth parliamentary sessions the bill, which did allow for Irish MPs, was passed by a narrow majority in the Commons but went down to defeat in the overwhelmingly Conservative House of Lords. The Conservatives formed a new ministry.

=== Constructive Unionism ===
Flag of the Congested Districts Board for Ireland, 1893–1907

Gladstone's Tory successor in 1886, Lord Salisbury, believed his government should "leave Home Rule sleeping the sleep of the unjust". In 1887 Dublin Castle was given standing power to suspend habeas corpus. However, as Chief Secretary for Ireland, Salisbury's nephew Arthur Balfour determined upon a constructive course. He pursued reforms intended, as some saw it, to "kill home rule with kindness".

For the express purpose of relieving poverty and reducing emigration, in the Congested Districts of the west Balfour initiated a programme not only of public works, but of subsidy for local craft industries. Headed by the former Unionist MP for South Dublin, Horace Plunkett, a new Department of Agriculture and Technical Instruction for Ireland supported and encouraged dairy cooperatives, the Creameries, that were to be an important institution in the emergence of a new class of independent smallholders.

Greater reform followed when, with the support of the splinter Liberal Unionist Party, Salisbury returned to office in 1895. The Land Law (Ireland) Act 1896 introduced for the first time the principle of compulsory sale to tenants, through its application was limited to bankrupt estates. "You would suppose", said Sir Edward Carson, Dublin barrister and the leading spokesman for Irish Conservatives, "that the Government were revolutionists verging on Socialism". Having been first obliged to surrender their hold on local government (transferred under the Local Government (Ireland) Act 1898 to democratically elected councils), the old landlord class had the terms of their retirement fixed by the Irish Land Act 1903.

During the constructivist 1890s, and before a Liberal government revived the prospects for home rule, unionists appeared more at ease with interest in Irish culture. The first Ulster branch of the Gaelic League was formed in 1895 in east Belfast under the patronage of the Rev. John Baptiste Crozier and Dr. John St Clair Boyd, both avowed unionists, and of the Orange Order Grand Master, the Rev. Richard Rutledge Kane.

But for many Irish unionists the chief-secretaryship of George Wyndham was "a last straw". In February 1905, they learned that his undersecretary, Sir Anthony MacDonnell, a Catholic, had helped devise a scheme for administrative devolution involving an Irish council of both elected and nominated members. Balfour, now prime minister, was obliged to disavow the scheme and Wyndham, pressed to deny his complicity, resigned. The uproar assisted the Liberal return to office in December.

=== Catholic unionists ===
The road to Catholicism's identification with constitutional Irish nationalism was "far from smooth and immediate", and a Catholic tradition of support for the union, focused on the value of stability and of empire, survived the first home-rule crisis. But it did not share the majority unionist conviction that any measure of devolution within the United Kingdom must lead to separation. Nor did it supply unionism with the equivalent of the Protestant nationalists who, individually, played a prominent role in home-rule and separatist politics.

A handful of Irish Conservatives, drawn from the Catholic gentry (and referred to pejoratively by nationalists as "West Britons"), were returned to the Commons before the 1884 Reform Act. A "unique place" was occupied by Sir Denis Henry (1864–1925). When he won his native South Londonderry seat in a 1916 by-election, he was the first Catholic to represent a unionist constituency in Ulster, and when he retained the seat in 1918, the future Lord Chief Justice of Northern Ireland was the last. Because of its institutional ties to the Orange Order, what post-Partition became the Ulster Unionist Party was effectively closed to Catholics.

== "The Ulster Option" 1905–1920 ==
=== Unionist labour ===
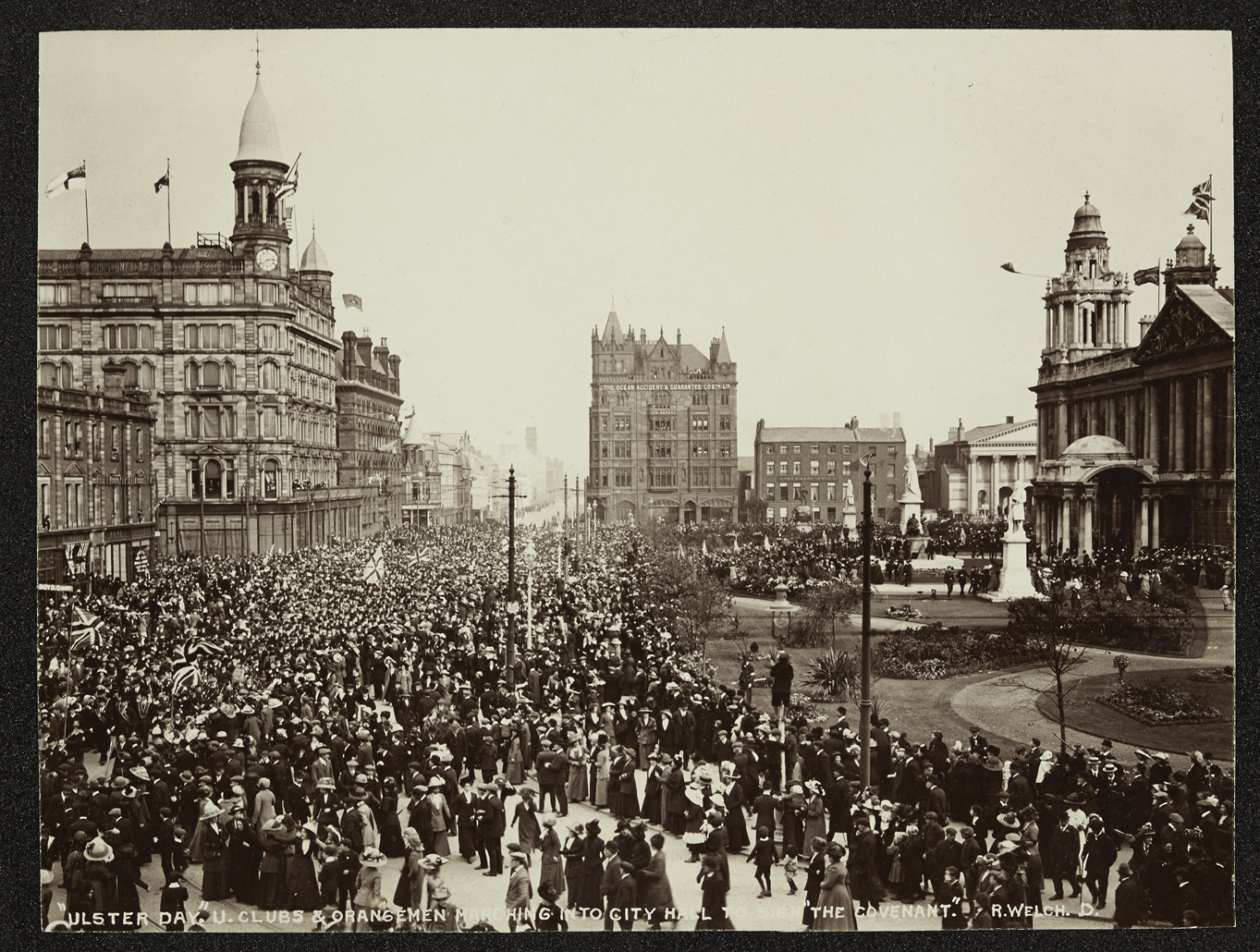
Ulster Day, 28 September 1912

In 1905, the Ulster Unionist Council was established to bring together unionists in the north including, with 50 of 200 seats, the Orange Order. Until then, unionism had largely placed itself behind Anglo-Irish aristocrats valued for their high-level connections in Great Britain. The UUC still accorded them a degree of precedence. Castlereagh's descendant and former Lord Lieutenant of Ireland, The 6th Marquess of Londonderry, presided over its executive. The Council also retained the services of Carson, from 1892 MP for Dublin University and supported him from 1910 as leader of the Irish Unionist parliamentary party. But marshalled by Captain James Craig, a millionaire director of Belfast's Dunville Whiskey, it was northern employers who undertook the real political and organisational work.

Unlike the southern landowners who were politically opposed by their Catholic tenants, the manufacturers and merchants of Belfast and neighbouring industrial districts could generally count on voting with the majority of their own workforce. But the loyalty of the Protestant worker was not unconditional. In the mind of many working-class unionists there was no contradiction between the defence of Protestant principle and political radicalism, "indeed, these were often seen as one and the same because it was the wealthy who were most prone to conciliation and treachery".

Exercising the new workingman's vote granted under the Reform Act 1867, in 1868 loyalists in Belfast had chosen their own "Conservative", rejecting a millowner and returning an evangelical Orangeman, William Johnston, to Westminster. Johnston proceeded to propose and vote for labour protection, tenant right, the secret ballot and woman's suffrage. In 1902, Johnston's successor as MP for South Belfast, Thomas Sloan, again was not the choice of employers. The campaign of the Belfast Protestant Association candidate was marked by what his opponents considered a classic piece of bigotry. Sloan protested the exemption of Catholic convents from inspection by the Hygiene Commission (the Catholic Church should not be "a state within a state"). But it was as a trade unionist that he criticised the "fur-coat brigade" in the leadership of unionism. Together with R. Lindsay Crawford and their Independent Orange Order, Sloan supported dock and linen-mill workers, led by the syndicalist James Larkin, in the great 1907 Belfast Lockout.

In July 1912, loyalists forced some 3,000 workers out of the shipyards and engineering plants in Belfast. Unlike previous incidents, the expellees included not only Catholics but also some 600 Protestants, targeted mainly because they were seen to support labour organising across sectarian lines. The unionist press depicted any connection with either British Labour or with the Irish Trades Union Congress as tantamount to support for Home Rule. At the same time, loyalist workers protested their portrayal as retainers of "big-house unionists". A manifesto signed in the spring of 1914 by two thousand labour men, rejected the suggestion of the radical and socialist press that Ulster was being manipulated by "an aristocratic plot". If Sir Edward Carson led in the battle for the Union it was "because we, the workers, the people, the democracy of Ulster, have chosen him". The majority of the signatories would have been organised in British-based unions, and could point to the growing political weight of British labour in reform measures such as the Trade Disputes Act 1906, the People's Budget 1910, and the National Insurance Act 1911. Nationalists did not seek to persuade them that collective bargaining, progressive taxation and social security were principles for which majorities could be as readily found in an Irish parliament.

=== Unionism and women's suffrage ===
Signing the Ulster Covenant Declaration, "Ulster Day" 1912

At the high point of mobilisation in Ulster against Home Rule, the Covenant Campaign of September 1912, the unionist leadership decided that men alone could not speak for the determination of the unionist people to defend "their equal citizenship in the United Kingdom". Women were asked to sign, not the Covenant whose commitment to "all means which may be found necessary" implied a readiness to bear arms, but their own Associate Declaration. A total of 234,046 women signed the Ulster Women's Declaration; 237,368 men signed the Solemn League and Covenant.

Unionist women had been involved in political campaigning from the time of the first Home Rule Bill in 1886. Some were active suffragettes. When, in 1888 the Women’s Liberal Federation split on the issue of Irish Home Rule, Isabella Tod, who with William Johnston had helped secure a municipal vote for women in Belfast, co-founded the Irish Women's Liberal Unionist Association. She believed "that petty legislature of the character which would be inevitable" under home rule would block "the whole work of social reform".

Her successors in the Belfast-based Women's Suffrage Society were not impressed by the 100,000-strong Ulster Women's Unionist Council whose Associate Declaration made no demand on behalf "of their own sex", and when Carson appeared to renege on a commitment to women's suffrage, they accepted the invitation of Dorothy Evans, an English organiser for the Women's Social and Political Union, to declare "war". A campaign against unionist-owned and associated property, culminating in the bombing of Lisburn Cathedral, came to end with Britain's declaration against Germany in August 1914.

Women were granted a parliamentary vote at the end of European hostilities in 1918, and (six years after it was granted in the Irish Free State) equal voting rights in 1928. (Only one woman was ever appointed to the Northern Ireland cabinet, Dehra Parker in 1949 as Minister of Health and Local. Government)..

=== 1912 Home Rule Crisis ===
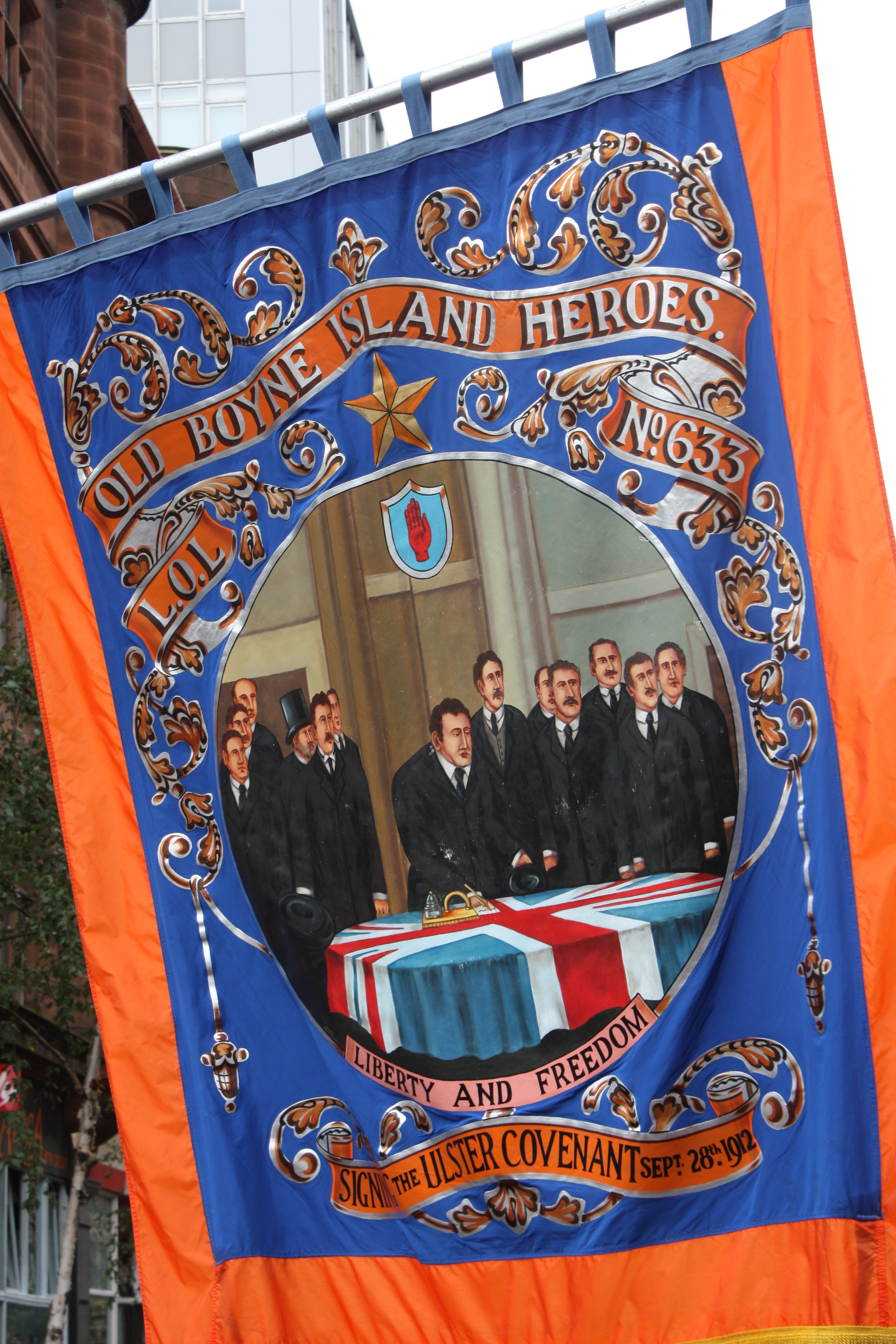
An Orange Order banner showing Carson the signing of the Ulster Covenant 1912

In 1911 a Liberal administration was once again dependent on Irish nationalist MPs. In 1912 the Prime Minister, H. H. Asquith, introduced the Third Home Rule Bill. A more generous dispensation than the earlier bills, it would, for the first time, have given an Irish parliament an accountable executive. It was carried in the Commons by a majority of ten. As expected, it was defeated in the Lords, but as result of the crisis engendered by the opposition of the peers to the 1910 People's Budget the Lords now only had the power of delay. Home Rule would become law in 1914.

There had long been discussion of giving "an option to Ulster". As early as 1843, The Northern Whig reasoned that if differences in ethnicity ("race") and interests argue for Ireland's separation from Great Britain, they could as easily argue for a separation of north and south, with Belfast as the capital of its own "distinct kingdom". In response to the First Home rule Bill in 1886, Radical Unionists (Liberals who proposed federalising the relationship between all countries of the United Kingdom) likewise argued that "the Protestant part of Ulster should receive special treatment . . . on grounds identical with those that support the general contention for Home Rule". Ulster Protestants expressed no interest in a Belfast parliament (they did not develop an express nationalism of their own), but in summarising The Case Against Home Rule (1912), Leo Amery did insist that "if Irish Nationalism constitutes a nation, then Ulster is a nation too".

On 28 September 1912, "Ulster Day", Carson led the Ulster Unionist Council in signing Ulster's Solemn League and Covenant at Belfast City Hall. This bound signatories "to stand by one another in defending for ourselves and our children our position of equal citizenship in the United Kingdom, and in using all means which may be found necessary to defeat the present conspiracy to set up a Home Rule Parliament in Ireland". In January 1913, he declared for the exclusion of Ulster and called for the enlistment of up to 100,000 Covenanters as drilled and armed Ulster Volunteers. On 23 September, he accepted Chairmanship of a Provisional Government organised by Craig. If Home Rule were imposed "we will be governed as a conquered community and nothing else". In April, the Volunteers smuggled 26,000 rifles and 3,000,000 rounds of ammunition from Germany through Larne.

By July 1914, the Ulster Covenant had been complemented by a British Covenant organised by Alfred Milner through the Union Defence League. Nearly two million signatories declared themselves willing to "supporting any action that may be effective" to prevent the people of Ulster being deprived "of their rights as citizens of the United Kingdom".

=== Partition ===
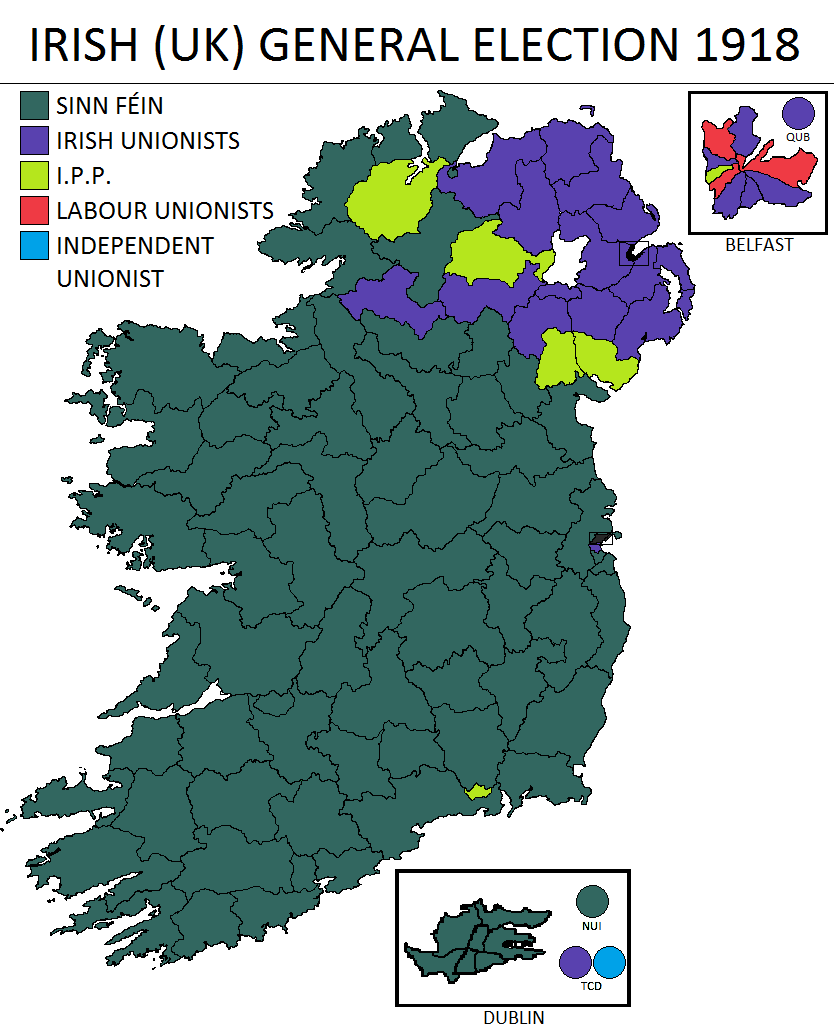
The 1918 general election result in Ireland. Sinn Féin sweeps the south and west.

On 4 August 1914, the United Kingdom declared war on Germany. A few weeks later the Home Rule bill received Royal Assent but with implementation suspended for the duration of European hostilities. With the issue of Ulster's exclusion unresolved, leaders on both sides sought favour with the Government and the British public by committing themselves, and their volunteers, to the war effort.

The strategy was challenged on the nationalist side by contingents of republican Irish Volunteers and Connolly's Citizen Army. In the aftermath of their Easter-week rising in Dublin, and in the course of a national campaign against military conscription, the IPP's credibility was exhausted.

In the Coupon Election of December 1918, the first Westminster poll since 1910 and the first with all men above 21, and women from age thirty, eligible to vote (the electorate tripled), the IPP was almost wholly replaced in nationalist constituencies by Sinn Féin. Acting on their mandate, Sinn Féin MPs met in Dublin in January 1919 as the Dáil Éireann, the national assembly of the Republic declared in 1916, and demanded that the "English garrison" evacuate. In the six north-east counties, unionists took 22 out of 29 seats.

Violence against Catholics in Belfast, driven out of workplaces and attacked in their districts, and a boycott of Belfast goods, accompanied by looting and destruction, helped consolidate "real partition, spiritual and voluntary" in advance of the constitutional partition. This otherwise uncompromising Republicans regarded as, at least for now, inevitable. In August 1920 Éamon de Valera, President of Dáil, declared in favour of "giving each county power to vote itself out of the Republic if it so wished".

In the hope of brokering a compromise that might yet hold Ireland within Westminster's jurisdiction, the Government proceeded with the Government of Ireland Act 1920. This provided for two subordinate parliaments. In Belfast a Northern Ireland parliament would convene for the six rather than nine Ulster counties (in three, Craig conceded, Sinn Féiners would make government "absolutely impossible for us"). The island's remaining twenty-six counties, Southern Ireland, would be represented in Dublin. In a joint Council, the two parliaments would be free to enter into all-Ireland arrangements.

In May 1921, elections for these parliaments were duly held. But in Southern Ireland this was for parliament which, by British agreement, would now constitute itself as the Dáil Éireann of the Irish Free State. Under the terms of the Anglo-Irish Treaty, the twenty-six counties were to have the "same constitutional status in the Community of Nations known as the British Empire as the Dominion of Canada".

Writing to Prime Minister David Lloyd George, Craig did insist that it was only as a sacrifice in the interest of peace that the North had accepted a home-rule arrangement its representatives had not asked for. However, in debating the Government of Ireland Bill, he had conceded that, while unionists did not want a separate parliament, having in the six counties "all the paraphernalia of Government" might make it more difficult for a future Liberal and/or Labour government to push Northern Ireland against the will of its majority into all-Ireland arrangements This was to become the prevailing attitude, summed up in a 1936 report of the Ulster Unionist Council: "Northern Ireland without a Parliament of her own would be a standing temptation to certain British Politicians to make another bid for a final settlement with the Irish Republic".

Having become Ulster unionists and then six-county unionists, "Irish Unionists had evolved into Northern Irish Home Rulers".

== Unionist majority rule: Northern Ireland 1921–1972 ==
=== Exclusion from Westminster Politics ===
The Coat of Arms of the Government of Northern Ireland (1924–1974). Escutcheon flanked by the Scottish lion and an Irish Elk.

Unionists have emphasised that their victory in the Home Rule struggle was partial. It was not only that twenty-six of thirty-two Irish counties were lost to the Union, but that within the six retained unionists were "unable to make the British government in London fully acknowledge their full and unequivocal membership of the United Kingdom".

Although formally constituted as a devolved jurisdiction within the United Kingdom, the Government of Northern Ireland had some of the formal features of the Canada-style dominion status accorded to the Irish Free State. Like Ottawa, Belfast had a two-chamber Parliament, a Cabinet and Prime Minister (Sir James Craig), and the Crown represented by a Governor and advised by a Privy Council. All this was suggestive, not of a devolved administration within the United Kingdom, but of a state constituted under the Crown outside the direct jurisdiction of the Westminster parliament.

The impression that Ireland as a whole was being removed from Westminster politics was reinforced by refusal of the Westminster to organise, or canvass for votes, in the six counties. The Conservatives were content that Ulster Unionist Party (UUP) MPs took their party whip in the House of Commons where, by general agreement, matters within the competence of the Belfast Parliament could not be raised. The Labour Party formed its first (minority) government in 1924 led by a man who in 1905 had been the election agent in North Belfast for the trade-unionist William Walker, Ramsay MacDonald. In 1907 MacDonald's party had held their first party conference in Belfast. Yet, at the height of the Home Rule Crisis in 1913, the British Labour Party had decided not stand against Irish Labour, and the policy of deferring to Irish parties was maintained after 1921.

United by the conflict unionists in Northern Ireland were opposed to ‘splitting’ in order to reproduce the dynamic of Westminster politics. Despite its broad legislative powers, the Belfast Parliament did not, have the kinds of taxation or spending powers that might have encouraged that kind of party competition. The principal sources of government revenue, income and corporation taxes, customs and excise, were entirely beyond Belfast's control.

=== Stormont government ===
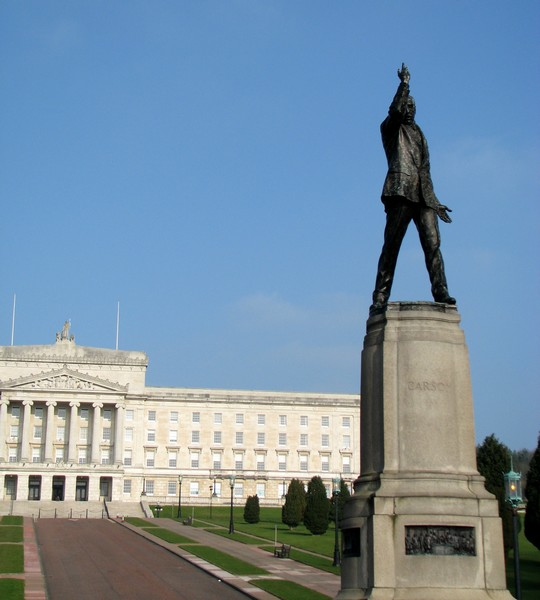
The statue of Lord Edward Carson in front of Parliament Buildings, Stormont

Until the crisis of the late 1960s, unionism in Northern Ireland was effectively single-party politics. In his 28 years in Stormont (1925–1953) Tommy Henderson, a North Belfast independent, was a one-man unionist opposition. In the 1938 the Ulster Progressive Unionist Party of William John Stewart attempted to join him, averaging 30% of the vote in ten otherwise safe Government seats. After positively endorsing the Union, in 1953 the Northern Ireland Labour Party won three seats. But for the most part Government candidates were returned by unionist voters without contest. The Nationalist Party did not take their seats during the first Stormont parliament (1921–25), and did not accept the role of official Opposition for a further forty years.

Proclaimed by Craig a "Protestant parliament", and with a "substantial and assured" Unionist Party majority the Stormont legislature did not, in any case, play a significant role. Real power "lay with the regional government itself and its administration": a structure "run by a very small number of individuals". Between 1921 and 1939 only twelve people served in cabinet, some continuously, and they, in turn, relied heavily on a small number of senior civil servants.

Not having campaigned for a devolved administration, unionists did not have a positive programme for government. Significant reform, when it came, at the end of World War II, was initiated from London. The Unionist Government under Basil Brooke accepted an offer—understood as a reward for the province's wartime service—to match the parity in taxation between Northern Ireland and Great Britain with parity in the services delivered. What Northern Ireland might loose in autonomy, it was going to gain in a closer, more equal, Union.

As a result, by the 1960s, unionism was administering something at odds with the general conservatism of those to whom leadership had been conceded in the resistance to Irish Home Rule. Under the impetus of the post-War Labour government in Britain, and thanks to the British subventions, Northern Ireland had emerged with an advanced welfare state. The Education Act (NI), 1947, "revolutionised access" to secondary and further education. Health-care provision was expanded and re-organised on the model of the National Health Service in Great Britain to ensure universal access. The Victorian-era Poor Law, sustained after 1921, was replaced with a comprehensive system of social-security.

=== 1960s: protest and reform ===
In 1965, the Nationalists were persuaded, for the first time, to assume the role at Stormont of Her Majesty's Opposition. With a series of conciliatory gestures—an exchange of visits with his counterpart in Dublin, Sean Lemass, visits to a Catholic hospitals and schools, flying the Union flag at half mast for the death of Pope John XXIII—Brooke's successor, Terence O'Neill, courted Catholic opinion. He spoke of a "a new Catholic intelligentsia", a product of the 1947 Education Act, that, "unwilling to put up with the deprived status their fathers and grandfathers had taken for granted", were willing to engage with unionists. John Hume, a teacher from Derry, had presented himself as a spokesman for an emerging "third force": a "generation of younger Catholics in the North" who were frustrated with the nationalist policy of non-recognition and abstention. Determined to engage the great social problems of housing, unemployment and emigration, they were ready to accept "the Protestant tradition in the North as legitimate" and that Irish unity should be achieved only "by the will of the Northern majority".

1971 newsreel on the background to the Northern Ireland Troubles

Pressure for substantial reform built when labour and republican groups joined, under the banner of Civil Rights, in public protests against discrimination in employment and housing. The violence that accompanied police and loyalist responses to the demonstrations and marches began making British and international headlines, and television news. In December 1968 O'Neill dismissed his hard-line Minister of Home Affairs, William Craig, and proceeded with a series of concessions: a needs-based points system for public housing; an ombudsman to investigate citizen grievances; the abolition of the rates-based franchise in council elections (One man, one vote); the replacement of the Londonderry Corporation (through which unionists had administered a predominately nationalist city) with an independent development commission, and a review of the broad security provisions of the Special Powers Act.

Facing a Backbencher motion of no-confidence, in January 1969 O'Neill called a general election. Having been cautioned in London that backsliding on reform would put British government subvention for Northern Ireland at risk, O'Neill asked Unionist voters if "a freedom to pursue the un-Christian path of communal strife and sectarian bitterness really more important to you than all the benefits of the British Welfare state?" His party split. Pro-O'Neill candidates picked up Liberal and Labour votes but won only a plurality of seats. In his own constituency of Bannside, from which he had previously been returned unopposed, the Prime Minister was humiliated by achieving only a narrow victory over Ian Paisley standing as a Protestant Unionist. On 28 April 1969, O'Neill resigned.

O'Neill's position had been weakened when, focused on demands not conceded (including repeal of the Special Power Act and disbandment of the Special Constabulary), republicans and left-wing students disregarded appeals from within Northern Ireland Civil Rights Association and Hume's Derry Citizens Action Committee to suspend protest. On 4 January 1969 People's Democracy marchers en route from Belfast to Derry were ambushed and beaten by loyalists, including off-duty Specials, at Burntollet Bridge That night, there was street fighting in Derry's Bogside. From behind barricades, residents declared "Free Derry", briefly Northern Ireland's first security-force "no-go area".

Tensions had been further heightened in the days before O'Neill's resignation when a number of explosions at electricity and water installations were attributed to the IRA. The later Scarman Tribunal established that the "outrages" were "the work of Protestant extremists . . . anxious to undermine confidence" in O'Neill's leadership. The IRA did go into action on the night of 20/21 April, bombing ten post offices in Belfast in an attempt to draw the RUC away from Derry where there was again serious violence.

=== Imposition of direct rule ===
To the extent they acknowledge inequities in unionist rule from Stormont—Paisley was later to allow "it wasn't . . a fair government. It wasn't justice for all"—unionists have argued these were a result of insecurity which successive British governments had themselves created by their own divided view on Northern Ireland's place in the United Kingdom. When the tensions to which it had contributed to in Northern Ireland finally exploded, unionists believe British equivocation proved disastrous. Had London regarded Northern Ireland is an integral part of the United Kingdom, where remediable by law social and political grievances would have been addressed, but at no point would acts of rebellion have been met with a policy of containment and negotiation.

The example of Free Derry was replicated in other nationalist neighbourhoods both in Derry and in Belfast. Sealed off with barricades, the areas were openly policed by the IRA. In what was reported as the biggest British military operation since the Suez Crisis, Operation Motorman, on 31 July 1972, the British Army did eventually act to re-establish control. But this had been preceded in the weeks before by a ceasefire in the course of which Provisional IRA leaders including Martin McGuinness and Gerry Adams), were flown to London for what proved to be unsuccessful negotiations with Northern Ireland Secretary William Whitelaw.

The common unionist charge was that Westminster and Whitehall continued to classify Northern Ireland, as it had Ireland before partition, as "something more akin to a colonial than a domestic problem". From the first street deployment of troops in August 1969 the impression given was of "a peace-keeping operation in which Her Majesty's Forces are not defending their homeland, but holding at bay two sects and factions as in Imperial India, Mandated Palestine or in Cyprus". This played into the republican narrative that "the insurgence in the housing estates and borderland of Ulster" was something akin to the Third World wars of liberation, and that in Britain's first and last colony "decolonisation will be forced upon her as it was in Aden and elsewhere". Unionism as an expression of settler colonialism, indeed, was an analysis promoted in Britain by left-wing commentators and scholars.

For the British Government internment, introduced in August 1971 at the insistence of Stormont government, proved a public relations disaster. It was compounded the Army's lethal use of live fire against unarmed anti-internment protesters, Bloody Sunday in Derry (20 January 1972) being the most notorious incident.

When In March, Brian Faulkner resigned as Northern Ireland Prime Minister rather than surrender control of internal security, British Prime Minister Edward Heath shattered the unionist "theory that the Army was simply in Northern Ireland for the purpose of offering aid to the civil power, of defending legally established institutions against terrorist attack". The Conservative government prorogued Stormont and imposed direct rule "not merely to restore order but to reshape the Province's system of government".

== Negotiating the Irish Dimension: 1973–2006 ==
=== Sunningdale Agreement and the Ulster Workers strike ===
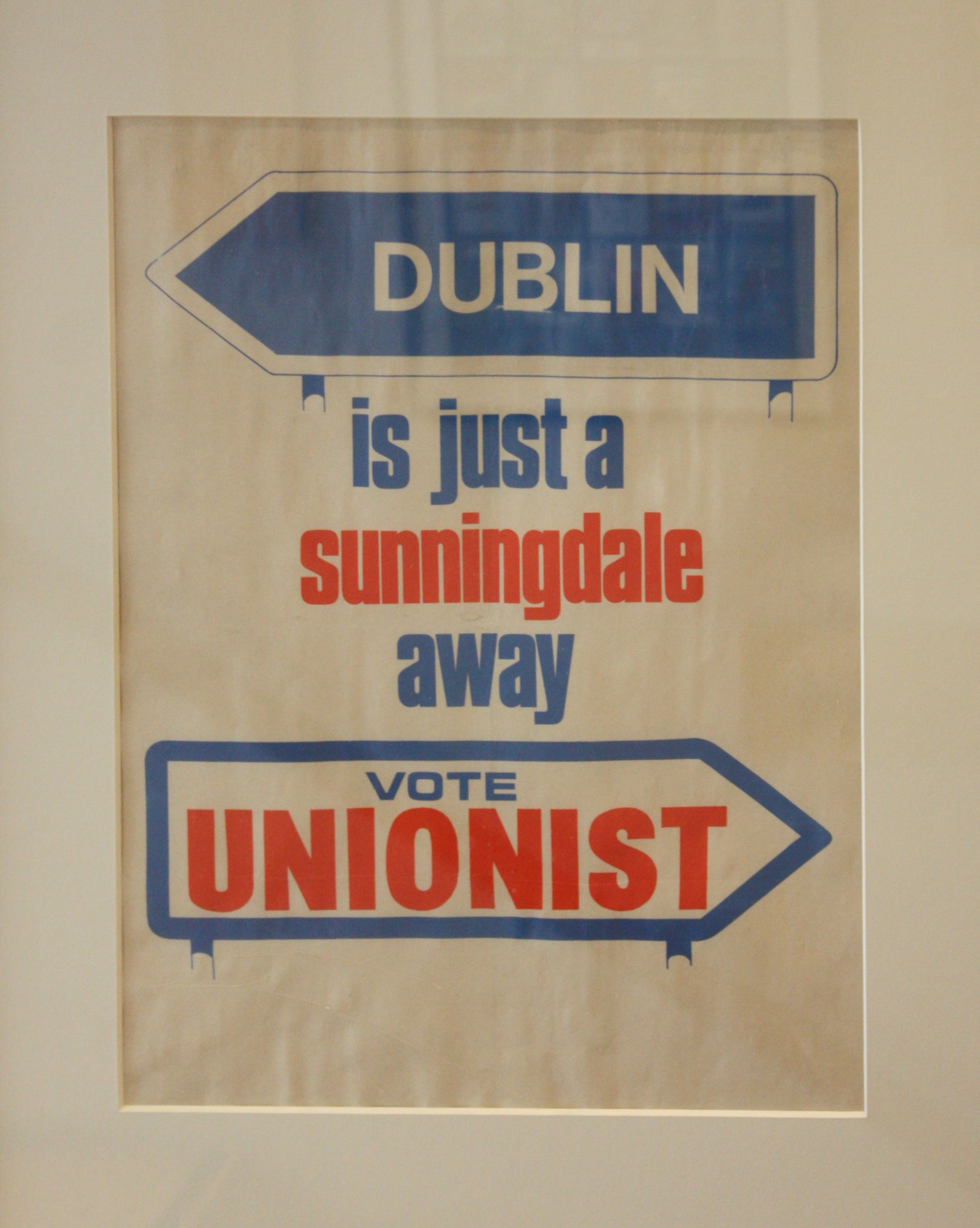
Anti-Faulkner Unionist election poster

In October 1972 the British government brought out a Green Paper, The Future of Northern Ireland. It articulated what were to be the enduring principles of the British approach to a settlement.

It is a fact that an element of the minority in Northern Ireland has hitherto seen itself as simply part of the wider Irish community. The problem of accommodating that minority within the political of Northern Ireland has to some extent been an aspect of a wider problem within Ireland as a whole.

It is therefore clearly desirable that any new arrangements for Northern Ireland should, whilst meeting the wishes of Northern Ireland and Great Britain, be so far as possible acceptable to the Republic of Ireland.

Northern Ireland must and will remain part of the United Kingdom for as long as that is the wish of a majority of the people, but that status does not preclude the necessary taking into account of what has been described in this paper as the 'Irish Dimension.'

A Northern Ireland assembly or authority must be capable of involving all its members constructively in ways which satisfy them and those they represent that the whole community has a part to play in the government of the province. . . . [T]here are strong arguments that the objective of real participation should be achieved by giving the minority interests a share in the exercise of executive power.

Elections to a new Northern Ireland Assembly were held in June 1973, and in December, at Sunningdale in England, Faulkner agreed to lead the UUP in a "power-sharing" executive with the new party that had emerged as the sole representative of the nationalist electorate, the Social Democratic and Labour Party. The SDLP had promised to prioritise the socio-economic, above the constitutional, question", yet with the Provisional IRA continuing to draw on public outrage over internment and Bloody Sunday, the party was under pressure to present the new dispensation as a means to achieving its "eventual" goal, Irish unity. The Sunningdale Agreement envisaged a Council of Ireland comprising, with equal delegations from Dublin and Belfast, a Council of Ministers with "executive and harmonising functions" and a Consultative Assembly with advisory and review functions.

Within a week of taking office as First Minister, Faulkner was forced to resign as UUP leader. A surprise Westminster election at the end of February was a triumph for the United Ulster Unionist Coalition, in which the bulk of his old party stood as Official Unionists with William Craig's Ulster Vanguard and Paisley's new Democratic Unionists. Faulkner's pro-Assembly grouping was left with just 13% of the unionist vote. Arguing that they had deprived Faulkner of any semblance of a mandate, the victors called for new Assembly elections.

When in May the Assembly affirmed the Sunningdale Agreement, a loyalist coalition, the Ulster Workers' Council (UWC), called a general strike. Within two weeks the UWC, supported by the Ulster Defence Association and Ulster Volunteer Force paramilitaries, had an effective stranglehold on energy supplies. His Ulster Unionist colleague on the executive, Basil McIvor, argued that Hume, in particular, blew "out the light at the end of the tunnel": he would neither agree to delay the introduction of the Council, nor accept as its condition repeal of Articles 2 and 3 of the Irish Constitution claiming Northern Ireland as the Republic's national territory.

After Mervyn Rees, the Northern Ireland Secretary refused his final plea for negotiation, Faulkner resigned as Chief Minister. Conceding that there was no longer any constitutional basis for the Executive, Rees dissolved the Assembly.

=== Unionism and loyalist para-militarism ===
In inaugurating a prolonged period of Direct Rule, the UWC strike weakened the representative role of the unionist parties. There were to be a number of consultative assemblies and forums in the years that followed, but the only elective offices with administrative responsibilities were in downsized district councils. The initiative in protesting what unionists often perceived as inadequate political and security responses to republican violence passed to the loyalist paramilitaries. In 1977, they attempted, but failed, to replicate the UWC strike in support of a "unionist wish-list" —a return, in effect, to Stormont-era majority rule. The remaining mark of their activity was assassination. In the course of the Troubles, loyalists are credited with the murder of 1027 individuals (about half the number attributed to republican paramilitaries and 30% of the total killed).

Loyalism, of which the once largely rural Orange Order had been the archetypal expression, is generally understood as a strand of unionism. It has been characterised as partisan but not necessarily party-political, and in outlook as more ethnic than consciously British—the perspective of those who are Ulster Protestants first and British second. As a label, Loyalism is consistently applied to paramilitaries and, on that basis, frequently used as if it were synonymous with working-class unionism. The paramilitaries were "thoroughly working class". Their hold, typically, has been upon working-class Protestant neighbourhoods and housing estates where they have compensated for the loss of the confidence they enjoyed as district defenders in early years of the Troubles with racketeering and intimidation.

Ulster Protestant Volunteers implicated Paisley, albeit via supposed intermediaries, in the bombings intended to "blow O'Neill out of office" early in 1969. Leaders of the UVF, however, insisted that while Paisley's rhetoric may have been inspirational, theirs was a tightly guarded conspiracy. The motivation to kill came largely from secular forces within the Loyalist community.

While denying any implication of political string pulling, paramilitaries suggested they could rely on elected politicians to deliver their message. Party leaders might condemn loyalist outrages, but inasmuch as they tried to account for them as reactive, as a response to the injury and frustration of the unionist people, they could be seen as employing sectarian killings for a common purpose, to extract concessions from the Government: "You know, 'if you don't talk to us, you will have to talk to these armed men". The relationship of unionists to loyalist violence, in this sense, remained "ambiguous".

=== Opposition to the 1985 Anglo-Irish Agreement ===
Campaign against the Anglo-Irish Agreement

In 1985 Prime Minister Margaret Thatcher signed an agreement at Hillsborough with the Irish Taoiseach, Garret FitzGerald. For the first time this gave the Republic a direct, consultative role in the government of Northern Ireland. An Anglo-Irish Intergovernmental Conference, with a locally based secretariat, would invite the Irish government to "put forward views on proposals" for major legislation concerning Northern Ireland. Proposals, however, would only be on matters that are "not the responsibility of a devolved administration in Northern Ireland". The implication for unionists was that if they wished to limit Dublin's influence, they would have to climb down from insistence on majority rule and think again as to how nationalists might be accommodated at Stormont.

The UUP and Paisley's Democratic Unionist Party jointly led an "Ulster says No" campaign against the Anglo-Irish Agreement, that included strikes, civil disobedience and a mass resignation of their MPs from Westminster and suspensions of district council meetings. In the largest unionist protest since Ulster Day 1912, on 23 November 1985 upwards of a hundred thousand rallied outside Belfast City Hall. With no relenting on the part of London, by the fourth anniversary of the accord, protests against the Anglo-Irish Agreement were drawing only token support.

In March 1991, the two unionist parties agreed with the SDLP and Alliance arrangements for political talks on the future of Northern Ireland. In their submission to the inter-party talks in 1992, the UUP said they could envisage a range of cross-border bodies so long as these were under the control of the Northern Assembly, did not involve an overarching all-Ireland Council, and were not designed to be developed in the direction of joint authority. While prepared to accommodate an Irish Dimension unionists, at a minimum, were looking for a settlement not an "unsettlement".

=== Integrationist unionism ===
As an alternative to devolution with an Irish Dimension, some unionists proposed that Northern Ireland reject special status within the United Kingdom, and return to what they conceived as the original unionist programme of complete legislative and political integration with Great Britain. This had been the position of the British and Irish Communist Organisation (B&ICO), a small contrarian left-wing grouping that had come to the attention of unionists through their Two-nations Theory of partition and their critical support for the UWC Strike.

The British Labour Party, they argued, had been persuaded that Irish unity was the only left option in Northern Ireland less on its merits than on the superficial appearance of unionism as the six-county Tory Party. Had Labour tested the coalition that was unionism as it began fracture in the late 1960s by itself canvassing for voters in Northern Ireland, the party might have proved the "bridge between Catholics and the state". Disappointed in Labour's response and contending with a unionist split (Democracy Now) led by the only Northern Irish Labour MP (sitting for a London constituency) Kate Hoey, the B&ICO dissolved its Campaign for Labour Representation in 1993. A broader Campaign for Equal Citizenship, in which for a period the B&ICO also participated, to draw all three Westminster parties to Northern Ireland similarly failed to convince. Its president, Robert McCartney did briefly hold together five "devosceptic" UK Unionist Party MLAs in the 1998 Assembly.

In July 2008, under Reg Empey, the UUP sought to restore the historic link to the Conservative Party, broken in the wake of Sunningdale. With the new Conservative leader David Cameron declaring that "the semi-detached status of Northern Ireland politics needs to end", Empey announced that his party would be running candidates in upcoming Westminster elections as Ulster Conservatives and Unionists – New Force. The move triggered defections, and in 2010 election the party lost their only remaining MP, Sylvia Hermon who campaigned successfully as an independent. The episode confirmed the UUP's eclipse by the DUP, a party that mixed social and economic populism with their uncompromising unionism.

=== 1998 Good Friday Agreement ===
SDLP leader Seamus Mallon quipped that the 1998 Belfast, or Good Friday, Agreement (GFA) was "Sunningdale for slow learners". This was not the view of David Trimble, with whom Mallon, as joint head of the new power-sharing Executive, shared the Office of First Minister and Deputy First Minister (OFMDFM). Trimble believed that unionism had secured much that had been denied to Faulkner 25 years before.

The Council of Ireland, that Mallon's party colleague, Hugh Logue, had referred to as "the vehicle that would trundle Unionists into a united Ireland" was replaced by a North-South Ministerial Council. "Not a supra-national body", and with no "pre-cooked" agenda, the Council was accountable to the Assembly where procedural rules allowed for cross-community consent, and hence a "unionist veto".

The Republic agreed to do what the SDLP had refused to consider in 1974, to amend its Constitution to omit the territorial claim to the whole island of Ireland and concede that Irish unity could be achieved only by majority consent "democratically expressed, in both jurisdictions in the island". The firm nationalist principle that unionists are a minority within the territory of the state was set aside.

In return unionists had to accept that the new Executive would be formed not, as in 1974, by voluntary coalition but by the allocation ministerial posts to the Assembly parties on a proportional basis. This d'Hondt method ensured that unionists would find themselves sitting at the Executive table with those they had persistently labelled "Sinn Féin/IRA". In 1998 Sinn Féin, who had been gaining on the SDLP since the eighties, had 18 Assembly seats (to 26 for the SDLP) securing them two of the ten Executive departments.

Unionists were concerned that this sharing of office was based on a principle that "rendered dangerously incoherent" the UK government's position in relation to the Union. The Agreement insists on a symmetry between unionism and nationalism, the two "designations" it privileges over "others" through the procedural rules of the new Assembly. Either can insist, through a Petition of Concern, on decision by parallel consent, and they nominate the First and Deputy First Ministers which, despite the distinction in title, are a joint office. "Parity of esteem" is accorded to two diametrically opposed aspirations: one to support and uphold the state, the other to renounce and subvert the state in favour of another. The UK government may have deflected the republican demand that it be a persuader for Irish unity, but at the cost, in the unionist view, of maintaining neutrality with regard to future of Northern Ireland.

In the UK's acceptance of Irish unity by consent had been there in 1973 at Sunningdale, in the Anglo-Irish Agreement of 1985 and again in the 1993 Downing Street Declaration in which London had disclaimed any "selfish strategic or economic interest" in the matter. Sinn Fein argued, nonetheless that the 1998 Agreement had "dealt the union a severe blow": "there was now no absolute commitment, no raft of parliamentary acts to back up an absolute claim, only an agreement to stay until the majority decided otherwise".

In the May 1998 referendum on the Good Friday Agreement, on a turnout of 81%, 71.1% voted in favour. (A simultaneous referendum held in the Republic of Ireland on a 56% turnout produced a majority in favour of 94.4%). The best estimates indicated that all but 3 or 4% of Catholics/Nationalists voted Yes, but that almost half of Protestants/Unionists (between 47 and 49%) stood with the DUP and voted No.

Chief among the DUP's objections was the continuation of the IRA as an armed and active organisation: the republicans were at the table while retaining, at readiness, the capacity for terrorist action further bolstered by the release of republican prisoners. In an agreement that called parties to use their influence with paramilitaries to achieve disarmament, there was no effective sanction. Martin McGuinness and Gerry Adams were free to insist that the IRA took their own counsel.

=== Democratic Unionists enter government with Sinn Féin ===
In October 2006 the DUP and Sinn Féin found an accommodation in the St Andrews Agreement, paving the way for Ian Paisley and Martin McGuinness to be nominated as First, and Deputy First, Ministers by a restored Assembly. Paisley insisted that the breakthrough was not, as Reg Empey, the UUP's new leader, suggested, the GFA "for slow learners": the IRA had disarmed, and Sinn Féin had committed to supporting "all the institutions of policing". Northern Ireland had "come to a time of peace".

After thirteen months in office Paisley was replaced as First Minister of Northern Ireland by his long-time DUP deputy Peter Robinson Robinson, and Arlene Foster who followed him in office from January 2016, had colder relationships than had Paisley with McGuinness and with his party colleagues and these eventually broke down. Citing "DUP's arrogance" in relation to a range of issues, including management of a financial scandal, in January 2017 McGuinness resigned. Sinn Féin refused to nominate a successor, without whom the devolved institutions were unworkable. Assembly elections followed on 2 March 2017. For the first time in the history of Northern Ireland as a political entity, with 45 of 90 seats unionists failed to secure an overall majority in a parliament of the region.

It was not until January 2020 that a deal was brokered, New Decade, New Approach, to restore Assembly, and to persuade Sinn Féin to nominate their new leader in the North Michelle O'Neill as McGuinness's successor.

In the Assembly, Paisley's former lieutenant, Jim Allister became the lone Traditional Unionist Voice MLA protesting an "enforced coalition" that "holds at the heart of government" those determined to subvert the state. In the 2024 general election, Allister was elected Member of Parliament for North Antrim, defeating incumbent Ian Paisley Jr. The seat had been held by a member of the Paisley family since 1970.

== Unionism as a minority bloc ==
=== Unionist demographics ===
Detail from 2015 Sinn Féin election flyer, North Belfast. Noting changed ratio of Catholics to Protestants in the once solidly unionist constituency, it called on voters to "Make the change".

The proportion of people across Northern Ireland identifying as Protestant, or raised Protestant, has fallen from 60% in the 1960s to 48%, while those raised Catholic has increased from 35 to 45%. (Only two of the six counties, Antrim and Down, now have "significant Protestant majorities", and only one – Lisburn – of its five official cities. A majority Protestant Northern Ireland "is now restricted to the suburban area surrounding Belfast"). Yet while the combined unionist vote has fallen, in the 2019 and 2024 Westminster polls to a new low of just over 43%, there has been "no comparable increase in the nationalist vote". Despite symbolic triumphs over unionism—returning the larger number of Westminster MPs in 2019, and Sinn Féin as the largest party to Stormont in 2022—at 40% the combined nationalist vote remained below the 42% secured in 2005.

Surveys suggest that half the people in Northern Ireland consider themselves neither unionist nor nationalist. However, those eschewing such labels (upwards of 17% also refuse a religious designation) tend to be younger and less likely to turnout in Northern Ireland's still largely polarised elections. It is still the case that few Protestants vote for nationalists, and few Catholics for unionists. They will vote for others, for parties that decline to make an issue of Northern Ireland's constitutional status, notably the cross-community Alliance Party of Northern Ireland.

Since O'Neill, who in the last Stormont parliamentary election personally canvassed Catholic households, there have been calls for unionism to break out of its Protestant base. When he was DUP leader, Peter Robinson spoke of not being "prepared to write off over 40 per cent of our population as being out of reach". Surveys had been suggesting that in a border poll between a quarter and a third of Catholics might vote for the Northern Ireland to remain in the UK. While anti-partition sentiment has strengthened post-Brexit, there may be a significant number of Catholics who meet the standard of "functional unionists": voters whose "rejection of the unionist label is more to do with the brand image of unionism than with their constitutional preferences". It remains the case that only one half of one percent of DUP and UUP members identify as Catholics: a handful of individuals.

=== Defence of unionist culture ===
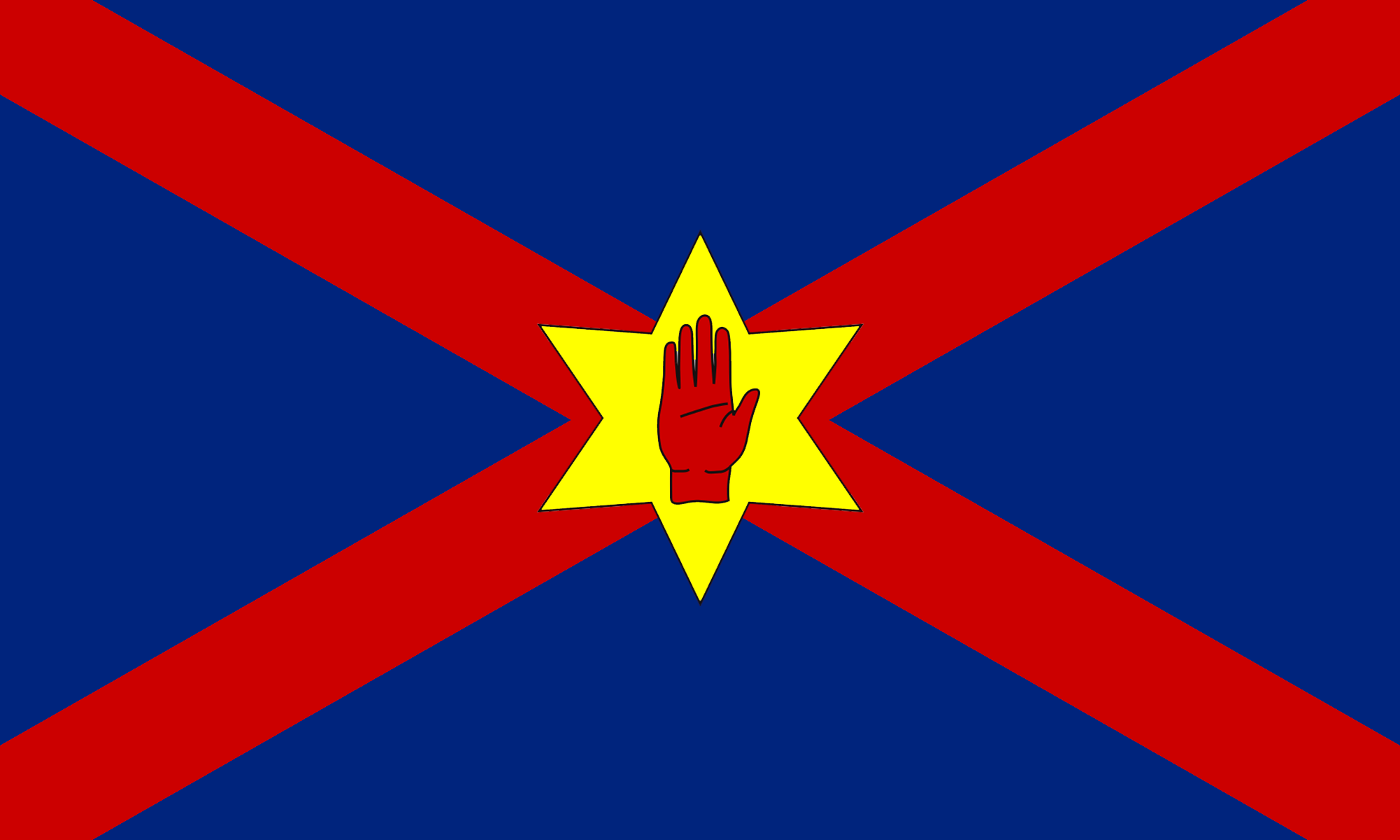
The cross of St. Patrick superimposed on the Scottish Saltire with a six-county star, Red Hand of Ulster and no crown: the "Ulster national flag" variously employed by Loyalist groups to represent an independent, or distinctly Ulster-Scot, Northern-Ireland identity.

In disclaiming any "selfish or strategic" British interest, the 1993 Downing Street Declaration had effectively ruled that "there could no such thing as disloyalty within Northern Ireland". The conflicting ambitions of nationalism and unionism were of equal validity.

Unionists accused nationalists taking this new "parity of esteem" as a license for a policy of "unrelenting harassment". Trimble spoke of having to reverse an "insidious erosion of the culture and ethnic national identity of the British people of Ulster" systematically pursued by "the Provisional IRA and its fellow travellers"; and Robinson of a "fightback" against the "unrelenting Sinn Féin campaign to promote Irish culture and target British structures and symbols".

Unionists alleged a "pan-nationalist [SDLP-Sinn Féin] front" was manipulating public order powers to ban, re-route or otherwise regulate time-hallowed Orange marches. The standoff at Drumcree, renewed in 2026, was the flashpoint in the late 1990s for Trimble. For Robinson and Arlene Foster it was the similarly drawn-out Ardoyne shop-fronts standoff (2013-2016) in north Belfast. A decision of the once firmly unionist Belfast City Council in 2012 to reduce the number of days the Union Flag was flown from City Hall, was also interpreted as a step in a wider "cultural war" against "Britishness", triggering protest.

In the 1998 Belfast negotiations, Prime Minister Tony Blair had been surprised by Trimble's last minute demand for recognition of a "Scottish dialect spoken in some parts of Northern Ireland" that Unionists regarded their "equivalent to the Irish language". In insisting on parity for Ulster Scots or Ullans, Trimble believed he was taking the cultural war onto the nationalists' own ground. Nationalists had "weaponised" the Irish language issue as "a tool" with which to "batter the Protestant people".

The decision by the DUP's first Minister of Culture, Arts and Leisure, Nelson McCausland, to resist Sinn Féin's demand for a stand-alone Irish Language Act, in part by insisting on compensating provisions for Ulster Scots, became one of the principal, publicly acknowledged, sticking points in the three years of on and off again negotiations required to restore the power-sharing executive in 2020. Other unionists objected to the strategy, suggesting that the "ethnic, religious or national special pleading" implicit in the parading, flags and language counteroffensive risked defining unionist culture as "subaltern and therefore ripe for absorption into Irish culture as a 'cherished' minor tradition".

The 2020 New Decade New Approach agreement promised both the Irish language and Ulster-Scots new Commissioners to support their development but did not accord them equal legal status. While the UK government recognised Ulster Scots as a regional or minority language for the "encouragement" and "facilitation" purposes of Part II of the European Charter for Regional or Minority Languages, for Irish it assumed the more stringent Part III obligations in respect of education, media and administration. Yet New Decade, New Approach did take a step with Ulster Scots that it does not take with Irish speakers: the UK government pledged to "recognise Ulster Scots as a national minority under the Framework Convention for the Protection of National Minorities". This is a second Council of Europe treaty whose provisions were previously applied in Northern Ireland to non-white groups, to Irish Travellers and to the Roma.

Insofar as unionists are persuaded to identity with Ulster Scots and employ it as a marker (as the reference to "the Ulster Scots / Ulster British tradition in Northern Ireland" in New Decade, New Approach might imply) they define themselves, "in effect", as a scheduled ethnicity.

In 2022, over the objections of unionists who in protest against the Northern Ireland Protocol continued to veto a return to devolved power-sharing, the legislation foreseen in New Decade New Approach was enacted by the Parliament of the United Kingdom. The Identity and Language (Northern Ireland) Act received royal assent on December 6.

=== Brexit and the Northern Ireland Protocol ===
While the UUP decided that "on balance Northern Ireland is better remaining in the European Union", in the run-up to the UK's June 2016 referendum on the future of UK membership in the European Union, the larger DUP, with an equal claim to be a pro-business party with a strong farming support base, campaigned actively for Leave. At a time when Sinn Féin was citing the cross-border, all-island, economic activity facilitated and supported by the EU as a further argument for Irish unity, there was a sense that, among other benefits, Brexit would restore a measure of "distance" from Dublin.

When, by a margin of 12% Northern Ireland voted Remain, the DUP was left to argue that Leave had been the UK-wide decision, and could be honoured only by the UK "leaving the European Union as a whole", its "territorial and economic integrity" intact.

In June 2017, the party's ten MPs enabled Theresa May's Conservative Government to remain in power in an otherwise hung parliament. Their confidence and supply agreement did not prevent May returning from Brussels at year's end with a proposal that Northern Ireland, alone, continue with the Republic of Ireland under a common EU trade regime. The new DUP leader, Arlene Foster protested that the hazards of a no-deal Brexit would be better than this "annexation of Northern Ireland away from the rest of the United Kingdom". She was supported by prominent Brexiteers. Boris Johnson told the 2018 DUP conference that leaving "Northern Ireland behind as a semi-colony of the EU," with regulatory checks down the Irish Sea, would be an "historic mistake".

Privately, Johnson complained that the attention to Northern Ireland sensitivities was a case of "the tail wagging the dog" Within three months of replacing May in July 2019, he had amended her withdrawal agreement, stripping the Irish Backstop not of its essential provisions—Northern Ireland would remain a customs point of entry for the EU—but rather dropping the suggestion that, to avoid treating Northern Ireland differently, the UK as a whole might accept an interim regulatory and customs partnership.

Unionists acknowledged the sense of "betrayal". Johnson's Northern Ireland Protocol was "the worst of all worlds". Citing free-trade provisions of the Act of Union, past and present unionist leaders pressed for a judicial review. When eventually rendered in June 2021, the ruling of the Belfast High Court was that while there indeed was a conflict with the Act, in approving the implicitly amending Protocol Parliament was sovereign.

Johnson had made one concession: every four years the Northern Ireland Assembly would be called upon to renew the region's new double-border trade arrangements. But this was to be by simple majority vote, a violation, the DUP claimed, of the GFA under which, they argued, any proposal to "treat NI differently to the rest of UK" had to be on the basis of parallel unionist-nationalist majorities. Citing " the total disregard of this principle", in February 2022 the new DUP leader, Jeffrey Donaldson, withdrew Paul Givan as First Minister, collapsing the Assembly and executive.

Two years later, on the strength of assurances that the Protocol (and the ancillary 2022 Windsor Framework) would be implemented without routine checks on internal trade with Great Britain and would be accompanied by measures to promote East-West (i.e. UK) as opposed to North-South (EU/Irish) movements of goods and services, the DUP agreed to a restoration of the Assembly. On 3 February, Michelle O'Neill (Sinn Féin) and Emma Little-Pengelly (DUP) were sworn in as First, and Deputy First, Ministers of a Northern Ireland executive in which, with 3 of 8 ministerial departments, unionists are for the first time a minority.

== Unionist political parties ==
- Irish Conservative Party (1835–1891)
- Irish Loyal and Patriotic Union (1885–1891)
- Liberal Unionist Party (1886–1912)
- Irish Unionist Alliance (1891–1922)
- Ulster Unionist Party (1905/1921–present)
- Commonwealth Labour Party (1942–1947)
- Protestant Unionist Party (1966–1971)
- Democratic Unionist Party (1971–present)
- Vanguard Unionist Progressive Party (1973–1978)
- Unionist Party of Northern Ireland (1974–1981)
- Volunteer Political Party (1974–1975)
- United Ulster Unionist Party (1975–1984)
- Progressive Unionist Party (1978–present)
- Ulster Popular Unionist Party (1980–1995)
- Ulster (Loyalist) Democratic Party (1982–2001)
- UK Unionist Party (UKUP 1995–2007)
- United Unionist Coalition (1998–2012)
- Northern Ireland Unionist Party (1999–2008)
- Traditional Unionist Voice (2007–present)
- NI21 (2013–2016)
