= Loyalist Anti-Repeal Union =

Irish Unionist organization

The Loyalist Anti-Repeal Union was an Irish unionist organisation established in 1886 in Ulster. It was created by the most influential Protestant groups - landowners, businessmen, churchmen - in opposition to Home Rule for Ireland. The movement grew rapidly and was helped along by the support of Conservative Party MP Lord Randolph Churchill who had decided "to play the Orange card." Essentially Churchill was trying to use Ulster unionism to weaken Gladstone's Liberal Party, in favour of the Tories. Churchill also famously said that the movement would receive support in England, and "Ulster will fight, Ulster will be Right."

== See also ==
- 1886 Belfast riots
- Government of Ireland Bill 1886
