= Irish Home Rule movement =

Political campaign for self-government (1870–1918)

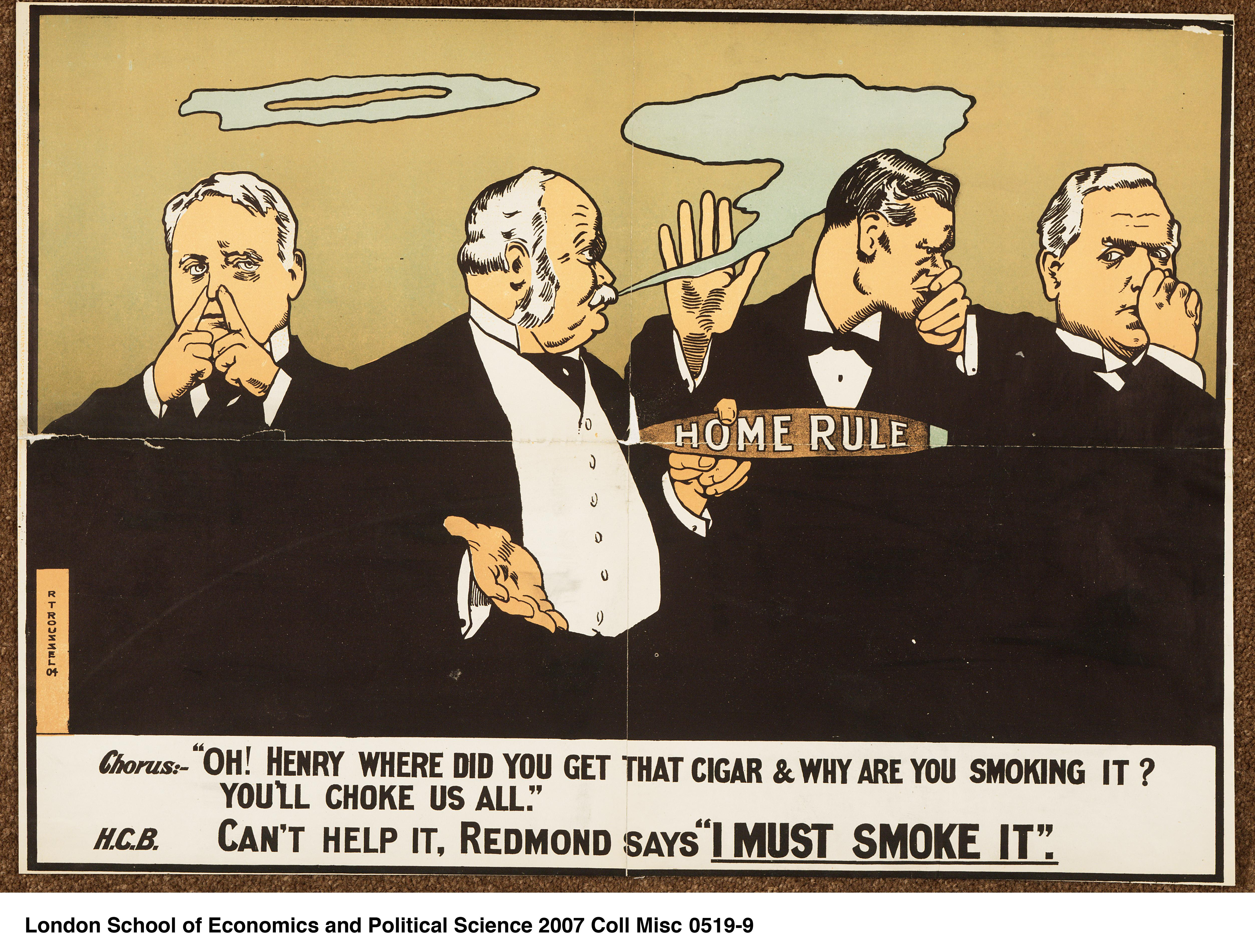
Cartoon: British Liberal Party politicians are forced to endure the stink of Sir Henry Campbell-Bannerman's "cigar" of Irish Home Rule. Former Prime Minister Lord Rosebery (left) and future Prime Minister H. H. Asquith (right) both regarded Home Rule as an electoral liability.

The Home Rule movement (Irish: Rialtas Dúchais) was a movement that campaigned for self-government (or "home rule") for Ireland within the United Kingdom of Great Britain and Ireland. It was the dominant political movement of Irish nationalism from 1870 to the end of World War I.

Isaac Butt founded the Home Government Association in 1870. This was succeeded in 1873 by the Home Rule League, and in 1882 by the Irish Parliamentary Party. These organisations campaigned for home rule. The House of Commons of the United Kingdom introduced the First Home Rule Bill in 1886, but the bill was defeated in the House of Commons after a split in the Liberal Party. After Parnell's death, Gladstone introduced the Second Home Rule Bill in 1893; it passed the Commons but was defeated in the House of Lords. After the removal of the Lords' veto in 1911, the Third Home Rule Bill was introduced in 1912, leading to the Home Rule crisis. Shortly after the outbreak of World War I it was enacted, but implementation was suspended until the conclusion of the war.

Following the Easter Rising of 1916, particularly the arrests and executions that followed it, public support shifted from the Home Rule movement to the more radical Sinn Féin. In the 1918 general election the Irish Parliamentary Party suffered a crushing defeat with only a handful of MPs surviving, effectively dealing a death blow to the Home Rule movement. The elected Sinn Féin MPs were not content merely with home rule within the framework of the United Kingdom; they instead set up a revolutionary legislature, Dáil Éireann, and declared Ireland an independent republic. Britain passed a Fourth Home Rule Bill, the Government of Ireland Act 1920, aimed at creating separate parliaments for Northern Ireland and Southern Ireland. The former was established in 1921, and the territory continues to this day as part of the United Kingdom, but the latter never functioned. Following the Anglo-Irish Treaty that ended the Anglo-Irish War, twenty-six of Ireland's thirty-two counties became, in December 1922, the Irish Free State, a dominion within the British Empire which later evolved into the present-day and sovereign Republic of Ireland.

== Historical background ==
Under the Act of Union 1800, the separate Kingdoms of Ireland and Great Britain were merged on 1 January 1801 to form the United Kingdom of Great Britain and Ireland. Throughout the 19th century, Irish opposition to the Union was strong, occasionally erupting in violent insurrection. In the 1830s and 1840s, attempts had been made under the leadership of Daniel O'Connell and his Repeal Association to repeal the Act of Union and restore the Kingdom of Ireland, without breaking the monarchical connection with Great Britain (i.e., personal union). The movement collapsed when O'Connell called off a meeting at Clontarf, Dublin, which had been banned by the authorities.

Until the 1870s, most Irish voters elected members of the main British political parties, the Liberals and the Conservatives, as their members of parliament (MPs). The Conservatives, for example, won a majority in the 1859 general election in Ireland. Conservatives and (after 1886) Liberal Unionists fiercely resisted any dilution of the Act of Union, and in 1891 formed the Irish Unionist Alliance to oppose home rule.

== Different concepts ==
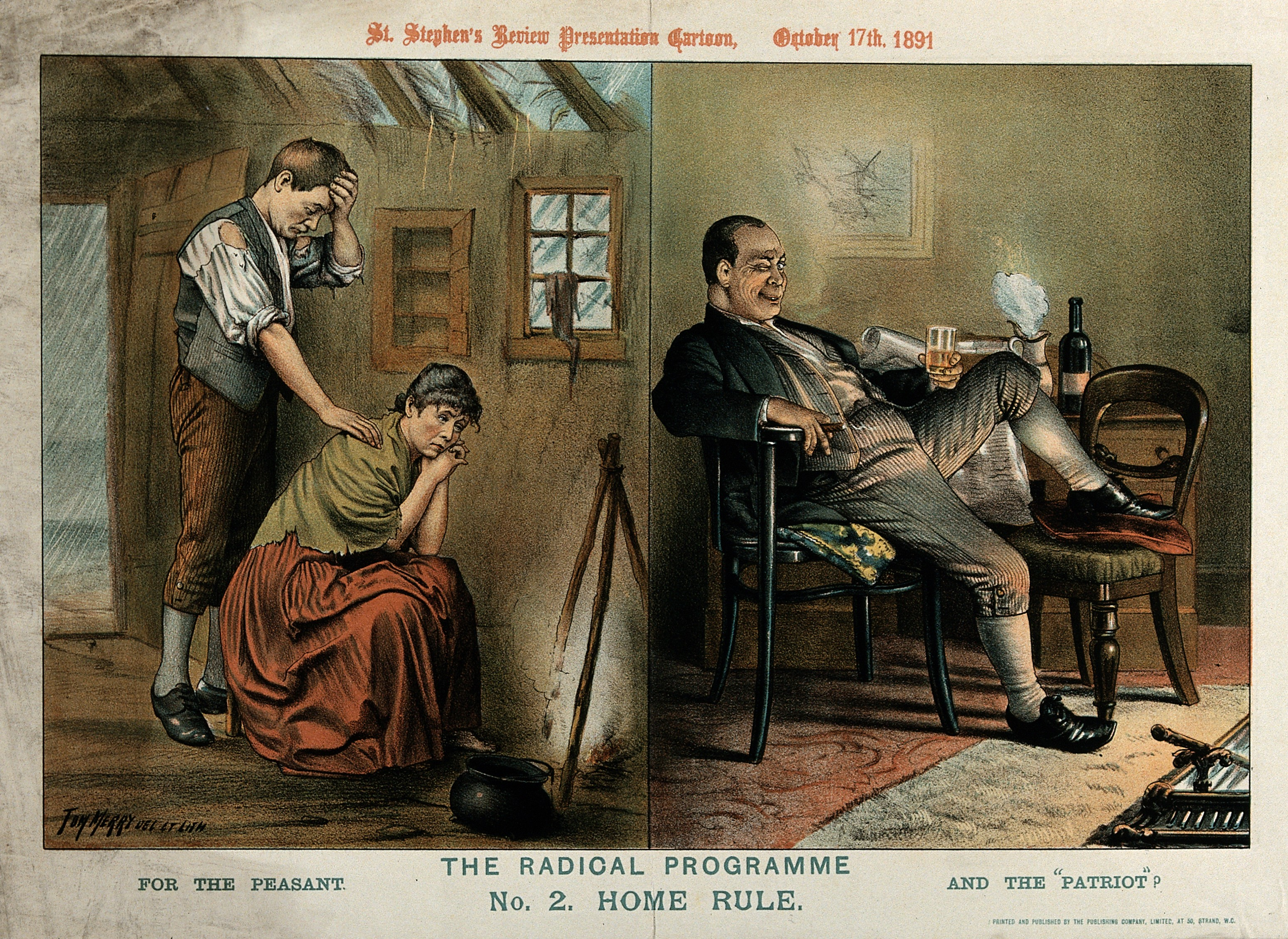
Anti-Home Rule cartoon, 1891: it claims that Home Rule will bring economic benefits to middle class "patriots", but ruin to the peasantry.

The term "Home Rule" (Irish: Rialtas Dúchais), first used in the 1860s, meant an Irish legislature with responsibility for domestic affairs. It was variously interpreted, and from the 1870s was seen to be part of a federal system for the United Kingdom: a domestic Parliament for Ireland while the Imperial Parliament at Westminster would continue to have responsibility for Imperial affairs. The Republican concept as represented by the Fenians and the Irish Republican Brotherhood, strove to achieve total separation from Great Britain, if necessary by physical force, and complete autonomy for Ireland. For a while they were prepared to co-operate with Home Rulers under the "New Departure". In 1875 John O'Connor Power told a New York audience that "[Ireland] has elected a body of representatives whose mission is simply – I almost said solely – but certainly whose mission is particularly to offer unrelenting hostility to every British Ministry while one link of the imperial chain remains to fetter the constitutional freedom of the Irish nation." Charles Stewart Parnell sought through the "constitutional movement", as an interim measure a parliament in Dublin with limited legislative powers. For Unionists, Home Rule meant a Dublin parliament dominated by the Catholic Church to the detriment of Ireland's economic progress, a threat to their cultural identity as both British and Irish and possible discrimination against them as a religious minority. In England the Liberal Party under William Ewart Gladstone was fully committed to introducing Home Rule whereas the Conservatives tried to alleviate any need for it through "constructive unionism". This was chiefly embodied by passing acts of parliament and enacting ministerial decisions viewed as addressing Ireland's problems and political demands during Conservative periods of government such as Balfour's decision as Chief Secretary for Ireland to create the Congested Districts Board, his earlier push for the Purchase of Land (Ireland) Act 1885 and the Land Law (Ireland) Act 1887 which expanded the Liberal's 1881 loan programme for small farmers to purchase lands (the programme overall was in response to the Plan of Campaign by Irish MPs), or the later Conservative government's implementation of the Local Government (Ireland) Act 1898.

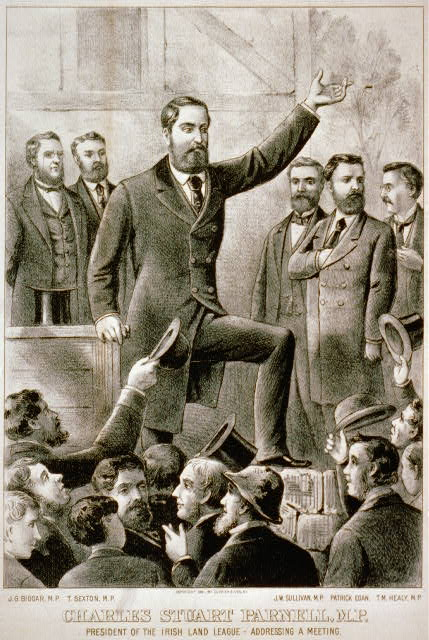
Charles Stewart Parnell addressing a meeting

== Struggle for home rule ==
Former Conservative barrister Isaac Butt was instrumental in fostering links between Constitutional and Revolutionary nationalism through his representation of members of the Fenian Society in court. In May 1870, he established a new moderate nationalist movement, the Irish Home Government Association. In November 1873, under the chairmanship of William Shaw, it reconstituted itself as the Home Rule League. The league's goal was limited self-government for Ireland as part of the United Kingdom. In the 1874 general election, League-affiliated candidates won 53 seats in Parliament.

Butt died in 1879. In 1880, a radical young Protestant landowner, Charles Stewart Parnell became chairman, and in the 1880 general election, the league won 63 seats. In 1882, Parnell turned the Home Rule League into the Irish Parliamentary Party (IPP), a formally organized party which became a major political force. The IPP came to dominate Irish politics, to the exclusion of the previous Liberal, Conservative, and Unionist parties that had existed there. In the 1885 general election, the IPP won 85 out of the 103 Irish seats; another Home Rule MP was elected for Liverpool Scotland.

== Opposition from the Lords ==
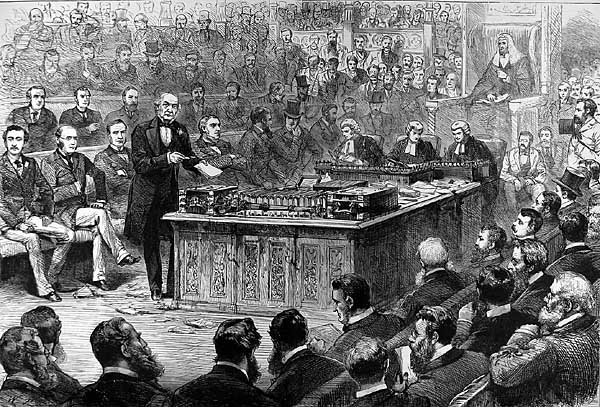
Gladstone at a debate on the Irish Home Rule Bill, 8 April 1886

Two attempts were made by Liberals under British Prime Minister William Ewart Gladstone to enact home rule. By 1885 Gladstone, impressed by Parnell, believed that the Irish people were "fitted for self-government" and had become personally committed to granting Irish home rule. With a three-hour Irish Home Rule speech Gladstone beseeched parliament to pass the Government of Ireland Bill 1886, and grant home rule to Ireland in honour rather than being compelled to do so one day in humiliation. The bill was defeated in the Commons by 30 votes.

The Bill led to serious riots in Belfast during the summer and autumn of 1886 in which many were killed, and was the cause of a split in the Liberal Party. The Liberal Unionists allied with Lord Salisbury's Conservatives on the issue of Home Rule until formally merging in 1912. The defeat of the bill caused Gladstone to lose office.

After returning to government after the 1892 general election Gladstone, made a second attempt to introduce Irish Home Rule following Parnell's death with the Government of Ireland Bill 1893. This bill was drafted in secret and considered flawed. It was steered through the Commons by William O'Brien, with a majority of 30 votes, only to be defeated in the Conservative's pro-unionist majority controlled House of Lords.

In 1894, the new Liberal leader Lord Rosebery adopted the policy of promising Salisbury that the majority vote of English MPs would have a veto on any future Irish Home Rule Bills. The Nationalist movement divided in the 1890s. The Liberals lost the 1895 general election and their Conservative opponents remained in power until 1905.

== Home Rule bills ==
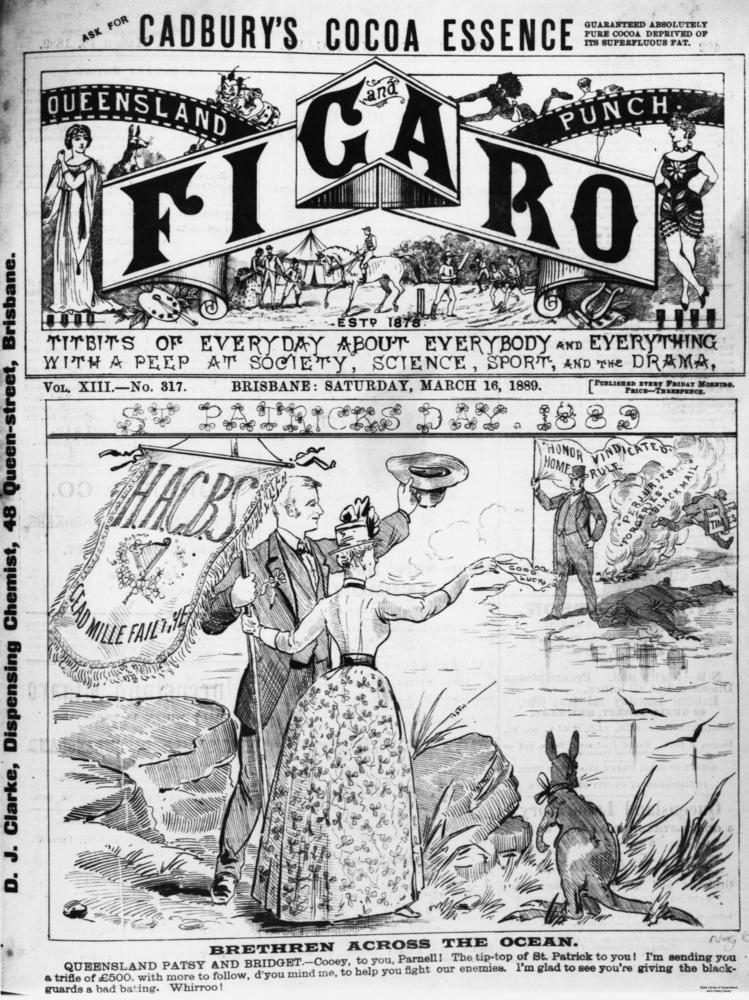
Queensland Figaro and Punch cover, 16 March 1889, depicting Irish Australians offering enthusiastic support to Parnell's struggle for Home Rule.

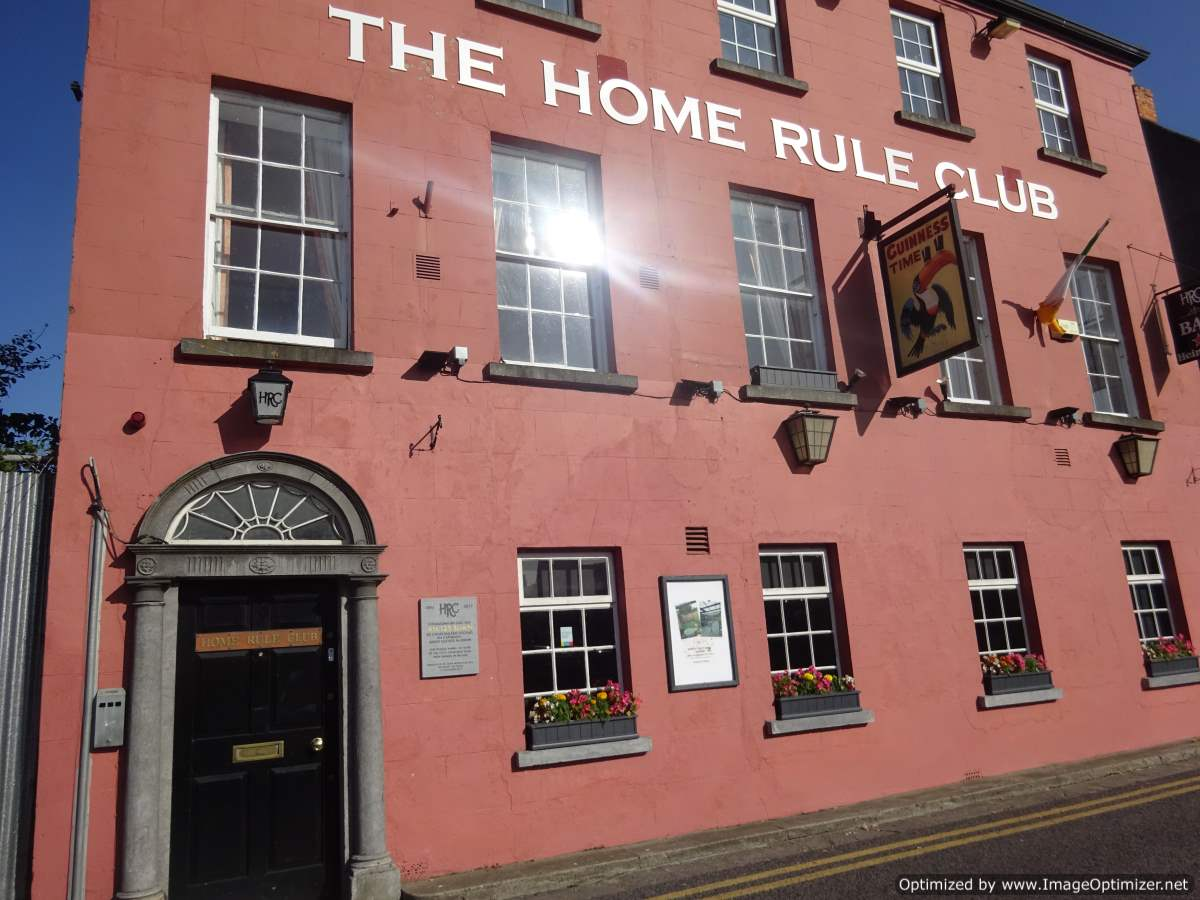
The Home Rule Club, Kilkenny, founded in 1894

The four Irish Home Rule bills introduced in the House of Commons of the United Kingdom during the late 19th and early 20th centuries, were intended to grant self-government and national autonomy to the whole of Ireland within the United Kingdom of Great Britain and Ireland and reverse parts of the Acts of Union 1800. The bills were:

- Government of Ireland Bill 1886 (the first Home Rule Bill): defeated in the House of Commons and not introduced in the House of Lords.
- Government of Ireland Bill 1893 (the second Home Rule Bill): passed the House of Commons, but defeated in the House of Lords.
- Government of Ireland Act 1914 (the third Home Rule Bill; the 1914 Act): passed under the Parliament Act 1911 after House of Lords defeats, with royal assent on 18 September 1914. It did not come into force, with the Suspensory Act 1914 signed on the same day.
- Government of Ireland Act 1920 (replaced the 1914 Act): established the partition of Ireland with separate areas defined as Northern Ireland and Southern Ireland as areas within the United Kingdom, each with its own parliament. The Parliament of Northern Ireland was established in May 1921. The Parliament of Southern Ireland was convened but never took effect. Southern Ireland was superseded by the Irish Free State as a dominion in December 1922 under the terms of the Anglo-Irish Treaty.

In 1920 the unionist peer Lord Monteagle of Brandon proposed the Dominion of Ireland Bill as a private member's bill in the House of Lords, at the same time as the Government bill was passing through the house. This bill would have given a united Ireland extensive home rule over all domestic matters as a dominion within the empire, with foreign affairs and defence remaining the responsibility of the Westminster government. Lord Monteagle's bill was defeated at second reading.

== Home Rule in sight ==
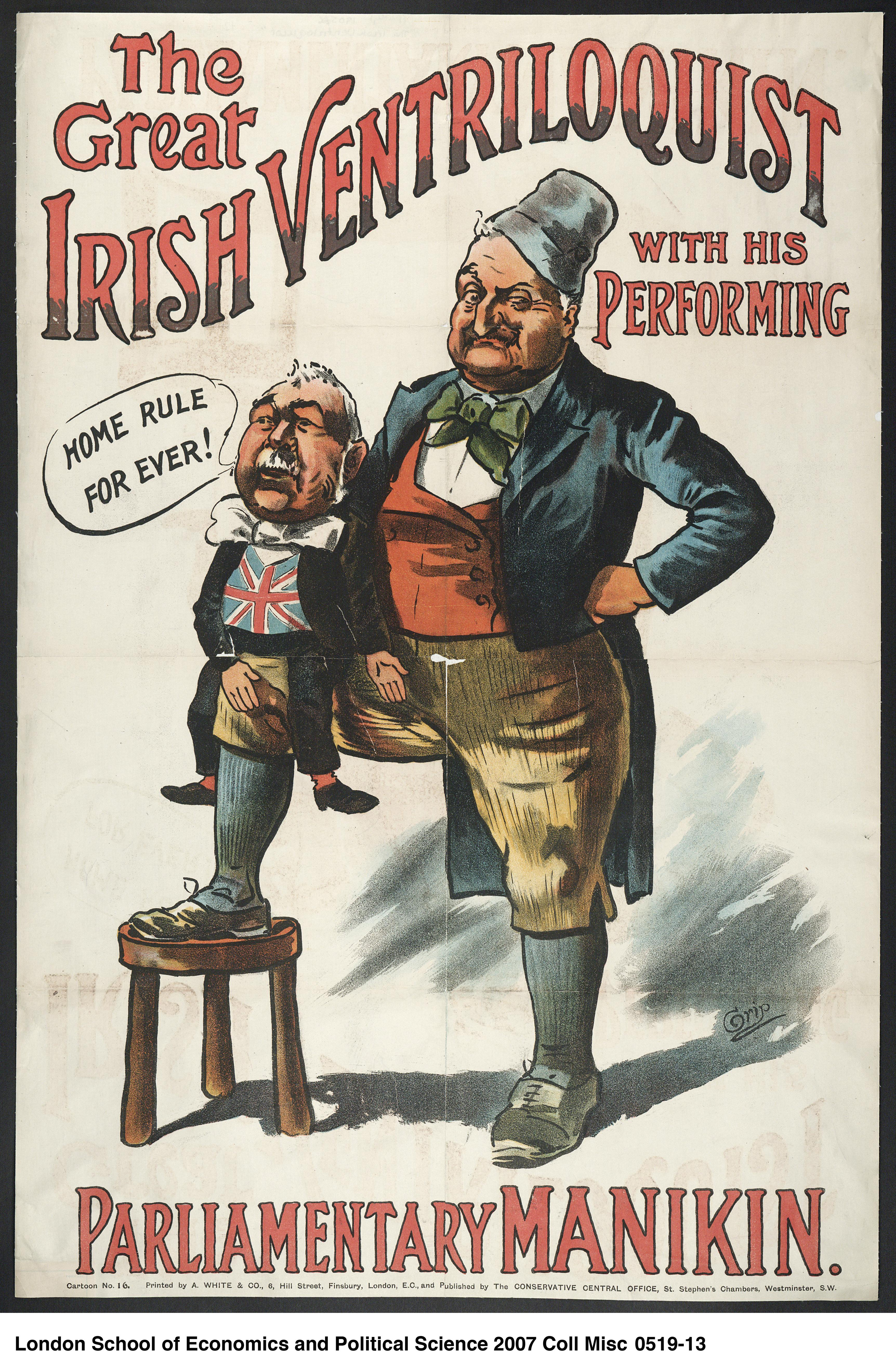
1900s cartoon claiming that John Redmond was controlling Prime Minister Henry Campbell-Bannerman

Following the 1895 general election, the Conservatives were in power for ten years. The significant Local Government (Ireland) Act 1898 (following the English Local Government Act 1888) introduced for the first time the enfranchisement of local electors, bringing about a system of localised home rule in many areas. In the 1906 general election the Liberals were returned with an overall majority, but Irish Home Rule was not on their agenda until after the second 1910 general election when the nationalist Irish Parliamentary Party under its leader John Redmond held the balance of power in the House of Commons. Prime Minister H. H. Asquith came to an understanding with Redmond, that if he supported his move to break the power of the Lords, Asquith would then in return introduce a new Home Rule Bill. The Parliament Act 1911 forced the Lords to agree to a curtailment of their powers. Now their unlimited veto was replaced with a delaying one lasting only two years.

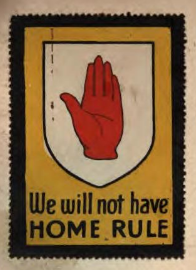
A sticker produced by Ulster loyalists to protest against Irish Home Rule (Note: Sticker found glued on the inside of the cover of A History of the Siege of Londonderry ... as digitised by Internet Archive)

The Third Home Rule Bill introduced in 1912 was as in 1886 and 1893 ferociously opposed by Ulster unionists, for whom Home Rule was synonymous with Rome Rule as well as being indicative of economic decline and a threat to their cultural and industrial identity. Edward Carson and James Craig, leaders of the unionists, were instrumental in organising the Ulster Covenant against the "coercion of Ulster", at which time Carson reviewed Orange and Unionist volunteers in various parts of Ulster. These were united into a single body known as the Ulster Volunteers at the start of 1912. This was followed in the south by the formation of the Irish Volunteers to restrain Ulster. Both Nationalists and Republicans, except for the All-for-Ireland Party, brushed unionist concerns aside with "no concessions for Ulster", treating their threat as a bluff. The bill received royal assent and was placed on the statute books as the Home Rule Act 1914 on 18 September 1914, but under the Suspensory Act 1914 was deferred for no longer than the duration of World War I which had broken out in August.

== Changed realities ==
With the participation of Ireland in the First World War, the southern Irish Volunteers split into the larger National Volunteers and followed Redmond's call to support the Allied war effort to ensure the future implementation of Home Rule by voluntarily enlisting in Irish regiments of the 10th (Irish) Division or the 16th (Irish) Division of Kitchener's New Service Army. The men of the Ulster Volunteers joined the 36th (Ulster) Division. Between 1914 and 1918 Irish regiments suffered severe losses.

A core element of the remaining Irish Volunteers who opposed the nationalist constitutional movement towards independence and the Irish support for the war effort, staged the Easter Rising of 1916 in Dublin. Initially widely condemned in both Britain and Ireland, the British government's mishandling of the aftermath of the Rising, including the rushed executions of its leaders by General Maxwell, led to a rise in popularity for an Irish republican movement named Sinn Féin, a small separatist party taken over by the survivors of the Easter Rising. Britain made two futile attempts to implement Home Rule, both of which failed because of Ulster unionists' protesting against its proposed implementation for the whole island of Ireland; first after the Rising and then at the end of the Irish Convention of 1917–1918. With the collapse of the allied front during the German spring offensive and Operation Michael, the British Army had a serious manpower shortage, and the Cabinet agreed on 5 April to enact Home Rule immediately, linked in with a "dual policy" of extending conscription to Ireland. This signalled the end of a political era, which resulted in a swing of public opinion towards Sinn Féin and physical force separatism. Interest in Home Rule began to fade as a result.

== Home Rule enacted ==
The war concluded in November 1918. At the 1918 general election held in December, the first in eight years, Sinn Féin secured a majority of 73 Irish seats of the 105 Irish seats (with 25 of these seats won uncontested). The IPP was decimated, falling to only six seats.

In January 1919 twenty-seven Sinn Féin MPs assembled in Dublin and proclaimed themselves unilaterally as an independent parliament of an Irish Republic. This was ignored by Britain. The Irish War of Independence (1919–1921) ensued.

Britain went ahead with its commitment to implement Home Rule by passing a new Fourth Home Rule Bill, the Government of Ireland Act 1920, largely shaped by the Walter Long Committee which followed findings contained in the report of the Irish Convention. Long, a firm unionist, felt free to shape Home Rule in Unionism's favour, and formalised dividing Ireland (and Ulster) into Northern Ireland and Southern Ireland. The latter never functioned, but was replaced under the Anglo-Irish Treaty by the Irish Free State which later became the Republic of Ireland.

The Parliament of Northern Ireland came into being in June 1921. At its inauguration, in Belfast City Hall, George V made an appeal drafted by Prime Minister Lloyd George for Anglo-Irish and north–south reconciliation. The Anglo-Irish Treaty had provided for Northern Ireland's Parliament to opt out of the new Free State, which was a foregone conclusion. The Irish Civil War (1922–1923) followed.

The Parliament of Northern Ireland continued in operation until 30 March 1972, when it was suspended in favour of direct rule by the Northern Ireland Office during The Troubles. It was subsequently abolished under the Northern Ireland Constitution Act 1973. Various versions of the Northern Ireland Assembly re-established home rule in 1973–1974, 1982–1986, intermittently from 1998 to 2002, and from 2007 onward. The Assembly attempts to balance the interests of the unionist and republican factions through a "power sharing" agreement.

== Effect on domestic tourism ==
In an 1890 guidebook to Ireland, produced as part of the Thorough Guides series in London, and mostly aimed at the British market, included a section in the introduction quelling potential fears concerning the contemporary political state in Ireland:

The present state of Ireland, in regard to politics and social questions, has greatly diminished tourist traffic of late years. As a matter of fact, the traveller may journey from Antrim to Kerry with as perfect freedom from risk or annoyance as between John o' Groats and the Land's End. Whatever may be the "troubles" of Ireland, they do not affect the safety or comfort of the tourist, and Pat, whatever his degree, is as pleased to welcome a Saxon with money in his purse and give him a "quid pro quo" as he ever was. The rollicking Irishman of popular tales, if he ever existed except in fiction, will not be met with, but one of the pleasures of travelling in Ireland arises from the genial kindness of all classes of her people.

== See also ==
- Irish issue in British politics
- Edward Carson
- James Craig
- John Redmond
- John Dillon
- William O'Brien
- Hugh Heinrick
- Loyalist Anti-Repeal Union
- Parliament of Southern Ireland
- Parliament of Northern Ireland
- Solemn League and Covenant (Ulster)
- Unionism in Ireland
- Devolution
- Easter Rising
- Local Government (Ireland) Act 1898
- History of the Republic of Ireland
- History of Ireland (1801–1923)

== Notes, references and sources ==
=== Bibliography ===
- Government of Ireland Act 1914, available from the House of Lords Record Office
- Brassey, Thomas Allnutt (1904). "The Irish Question: Extract from Address at Pokesdown, Bournemouth, November 8th, 1898." . Problems of Empire: 49–51. Wikidata Q107151188 – via Wikisource.
- Hennessey, Thomas: Dividing Ireland, World War 1 and Partition, (1998), ISBN 0-415-17420-1
- Irish Government Bill 1893, available from the House of Lords Record Office
- Jackson, Alvin: Home Rule, an Irish History 1800–2000, Phoenix Press (2003), ISBN 0-7538-1767-5
- Kee, Robert: The Green Flag: A History of Irish Nationalism,(2000 edition, first published 1972), ISBN 0-14-029165-2
- Kendle, John (1989). Ireland and the Federal Solution. McGill–Queen's University Press. ISBN 0773506764. JSTOR j.ctt80mhv.
- Lewis, Geoffrey: Carson, the Man who divided Ireland (2005),ISBN 1-85285-454-5
- Loughlin, James Gladstone, Home Rule and the Ulster Question, 1882–1893, Dublin: (1986)
- MacDonagh, Michael: The Home Rule Movement, Talbot Press, Dublin (1920)
- Martin, Arthur Patchett (1889). "Australia and Irish Home Rule" . Australia and the Empire. pp. 115–134. Wikidata Q107340700 – via Wikisource.
- O'Connor Power, John (1886). The Anglo-Irish Quarrel: A Plea for Peace. London., a reprint of recent articles in the Manchester Guardian, revised by the author
- O'Donnell, F. Hugh, 'A History of the Irish Parliamentary Party', 2 vols (London, 1910)
- Rodner, W. S.: "Leaguers, Covenanters, Moderates: British Support for Ulster, 1913–14" pages 68–85 from Éire-Ireland, Volume 17, Issue #3, 1982.
- Smith, Jeremy: "Bluff, Bluster and Brinkmanship: Andrew Bonar Law and the Third Home Rule Bill" pages 161–174 from Historical Journal, Volume 36, Issue #1, (1993)
- Turner, Edward Raymond (1917). "Opposition to Home Rule". American Political Science Review. 11 (3): 448–460.
- Baddeley, M. J. B. (1890). Thorough Guide Series. Ireland (Part I). Northern Counties including Dublin and Neighbourhood (Second Edition - Revised). Thorough guide series; 12. London: Dulau & Co., 37, Soho Square, W.

=== External links ===
- Ulster Covenant – Public Record Office of Northern Ireland
- History of the 1912 UVF
- CAIN – University of Ulster Conflict Archive
- Ulster, 1912 (Kipling) at Words (etext library)
- Text of the Government of Ireland Act 1920 (repealed 2.12.1999) as in force today (including any amendments) within the United Kingdom, from legislation.gov.uk.
- Text of the Act as applied in Northern Ireland in 1956
- Text of the Act as originally enacted in 1920, from BAILII
- House of Lords Library – Record Office, for Texts of Irish Government bills
- Department of the Taoiseach: Irish Soldiers in the First World War
