= Government of Ireland Bill 1886 =

1886 United Kingdom legislation providing home rule to Ireland; failed to pass

First Home Rule Bill

Name and origin
- Official name of legislation: Government of Ireland Bill 1886
- Location: Ireland
- Year: 1886
- Government introduced: Gladstone (Liberal)

Parliamentary passage
- House of Commons passed?: No
- House of Lords passed?: Not applicable
- Royal Assent?: Not Applicable

Defeated
- Which House: House of Commons
- Which stage: 2nd stage
- Final vote: Aye: 311; No 341
- Date: 8 June 1886

Details of legislation
- Legislature type: unicameral
- Unicameral subdivision: 2 Orders
- Name(s): not given
- Size(s): 1st Order – 100 (25 peers, 75 elected); 2nd Order 204–206 members
- MPs in Westminster: none
- Executive head: Lord Lieutenant
- Executive body: none
- Prime Minister in text: none
- Responsible executive: no

Enactment
- Act implemented: not applicable
- Succeeded by: Irish Government Bill 1893

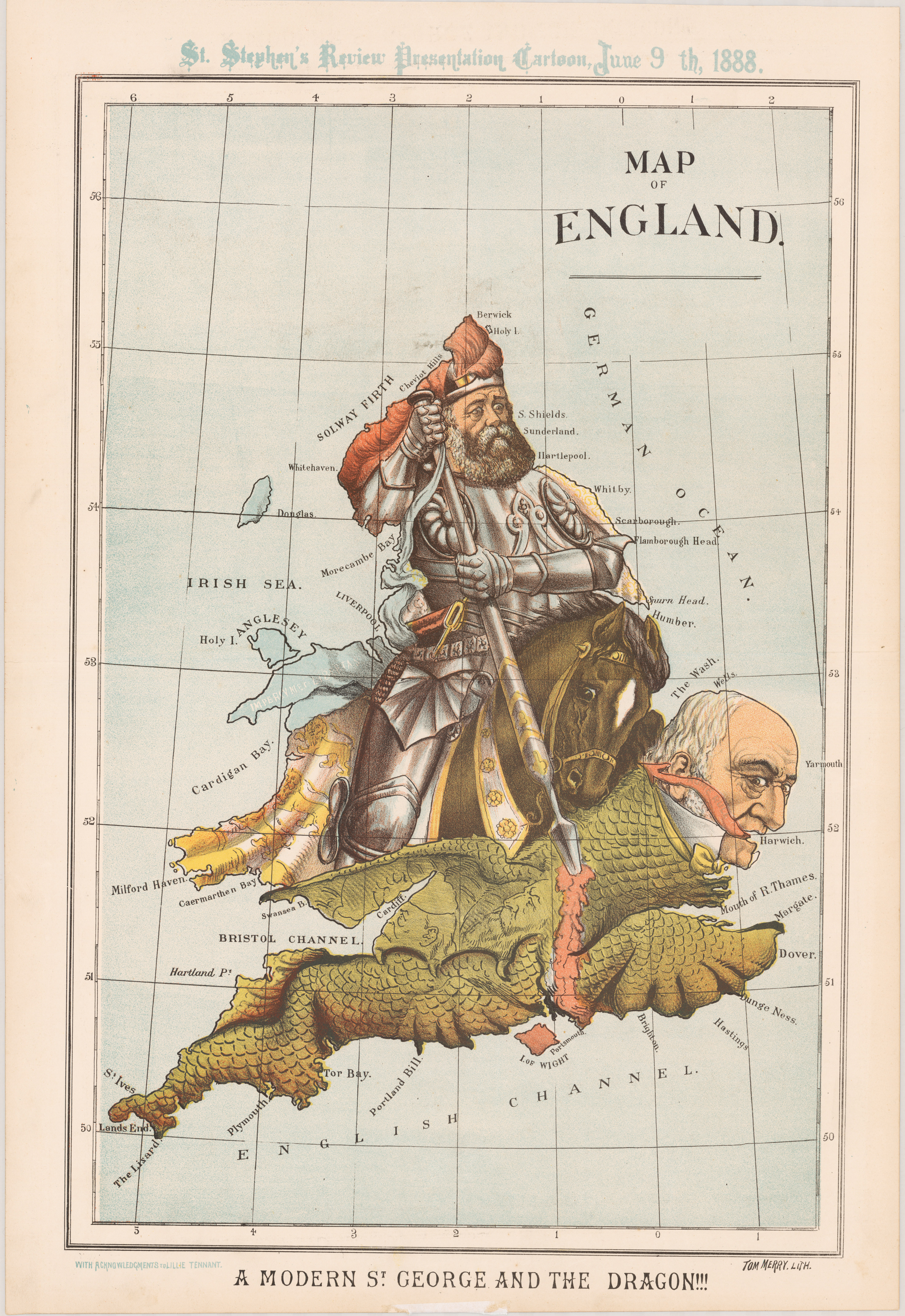
This map, named "Modern St. George and The Dragon", satirises the Irish Home Rule crisis of 1886 and appeared two years later in the Conservative St Stephen's Review. Lord Salisbury as St George spears the dragon Gladstone.

The Government of Ireland Bill 1886, commonly known as the First Home Rule Bill, was the first major attempt made by a British government to enact a law creating home rule for part of the United Kingdom of Great Britain and Ireland. It was introduced on 8 April 1886 by Liberal Prime Minister William Gladstone to create a devolved assembly for Ireland which would govern Ireland in specified areas. The Irish Parliamentary Party had been campaigning for home rule for Ireland since the 1860s.

The bill, like his Irish Land Act 1870, was very much the work of Gladstone, who excluded both the Irish MPs and his own ministers from participation in the drafting. Following the Purchase of Land (Ireland) Act 1885 it was to be introduced alongside a new Land Purchase Bill to reform tenant rights, but the latter was abandoned.

== Key aspects ==
The key aspects of the 1886 bill were:

=== Legislative ===
- A unicameral assembly (deliberately not called a parliament to avoid links with the former Irish parliament abolished in 1800 under the Act of Union) consisting of two Orders which could meet either together or separately.
  - The first Order was to consist of the 28 Irish representative peers (the Irish peers traditionally elected by all Irish peers to sit in the House of Lords at Westminster) plus 75 members elected through a highly restricted franchise. It could delay the passage of legislation for 3 years.
  - The second Order was to consist of either 204 or 206 members. It had not been decided whether to have two members elected by the graduates of the Royal University to match the two members traditionally elected by graduates of Dublin University (Trinity College).
- All Irish MPs would be excluded from Westminster altogether.

=== Executive ===
- Executive power would be possessed by the Lord Lieutenant of Ireland whose executive would not be responsible to either Order.

=== Reserve powers ===
- Britain would still retain control over a range of issues including peace, war, defence, treaties with foreign states, trade and coinage.
- No special provision was made for Ulster.
- Britain would retain control of the Royal Irish Constabulary until it deemed it safe for control to pass to Dublin. The Dublin Metropolitan Police would pass to Irish control.

== Reaction ==
When the bill was introduced, Charles Stewart Parnell had a mixed reaction. He said that it had great faults but was prepared to vote for it. In his famous Irish Home Rule speech, Gladstone beseeched Parliament to pass it and grant Home Rule to Ireland in honour rather than being compelled to one day in humiliation. Unionists and the Orange Order were fierce in their resistance; for them, any measure of Home Rule was denounced as nothing other than Rome Rule. In the staunchly loyalist town of Portadown, the so-called 'Orange Citadel' where the Orange Order was founded in 1795, Orangemen and their supporters celebrated the Bill's defeat by 'Storming the Tunnel'. This was the headline in the local paper where it was reported that a mob attacked the small Catholic/Nationalist ghetto of Obins Street.

The vote on the Bill took place after two months of debate and, on 8 June 1886, 341 voted against it (including 93 Liberals) while 311 voted for it. Parliament was dissolved on 26 June and the 1886 United Kingdom general election was called. The Liberal Unionist Party was formed to contest the election and won 77 seats. They formed a coalition government with the Conservatives and continued allying with them in subsequent elections until the parties merged in 1912.

Historians have suggested that the 1886 Home Rule Bill was fatally flawed by the secretive manner of its drafting, with Gladstone alienating Liberal figures like Joseph Chamberlain who, along with a colleague, resigned in protest from the ministry, while producing a Bill viewed privately by the Irish as badly drafted and deeply flawed.

Government of Ireland Bill 1886, Second Reading
Ballot →	7 June 1886
No (Conservatives (248), Liberals (92), Crofters (1))	341 / 670
Yes (Liberals (224), IPP (84), Crofters (2), Lib-Lab (1))	311 / 670
Abstentions	18 / 670
Sources: Hansard

== See also ==
- 1886 Belfast riots
- Government of Ireland Bill 1893 (Second Irish Home Rule Bill)
- Government of Ireland Act 1914 (Third Irish Home Rule Bill)
- Government of Ireland Act 1920 (Fourth Irish Home Rule Bill)
- History of Ireland (1801–1923)
