= Government of Ireland Bill 1893 =

Failed bill of the UK Parliament

Second Home Rule Bill

Name and origin
- Official name of legislation: Government of Ireland Bill 1893
- Location: Ireland
- Year: 1893
- Government introduced: Gladstone (Liberal)

Parliamentary passage
- House of Commons passed?: Yes
- House of Lords passed?: No
- Royal Assent?: Not Applicable

Defeated
- Which House: House of Lords
- Which stage: 1st stage
- Final vote: Content: 41; Not content 419
- Date: September 1893

Details of legislation
- Legislature type: bicameral
- Unicameral subdivision: none
- Name(s): upper: Legislative Council; lower: Legislative Assembly
- Size(s): Council: 48 elected by high franchise Assembly: 103 members
- MPs in Westminster: 80 MPs
- Executive head: Lord Lieutenant
- Executive body: Executive Committee of the Privy Council of Ireland
- Prime Minister in text: none
- Responsible executive: no

Enactment
- Act implemented: not applicable
- Succeeded by: Government of Ireland Act 1914

The Government of Ireland Bill 1893 (known generally as the Second Home Rule Bill) was the second attempt made by Liberal Party leader William Ewart Gladstone, as Prime Minister of the United Kingdom, to enact a system of home rule for Ireland. Unlike the first attempt, which was defeated in the House of Commons, the second Bill was passed by the Commons but vetoed by the House of Lords.

== Background ==
Gladstone had become personally committed to the granting of Irish home rule in 1885, a fact revealed (possibly accidentally) in what became known as the Hawarden Kite. Though his 1886 Home Rule Bill had caused him to lose power after members of his party left to form the Liberal Unionist Party, once re-appointed prime minister in August 1892 Gladstone committed himself to introducing a new Home Rule Bill for Ireland.

The Irish Parliamentary Party had divided in 1891 on the leadership of Charles Stewart Parnell (who died later in 1891), with a majority leaving the Irish National League to form the Irish National Federation, remaining divided until 1900.

As with the first bill, the second bill was controversially drafted in secret by Gladstone, who excluded both Irish MPs and his own ministry from participating in the drafting. The decision led to a serious factual error in the Bill, a mistake over the calculation of how much Ireland should contribute to the British Imperial Exchequer. The error in the calculation was £360,000, a vast sum for the time. The error was discovered during the Committee Stage of the Bill's passage through the Commons and forced a major revision of the financial proposals.

== Debate ==
The Chancellor of the Exchequer, Sir William Harcourt, was himself alienated from the Bill having been excluded by Gladstone from its preparation, while the Chief Secretary for Ireland was engaged on other matters, and Gladstone, in the words of a historian, "increasingly disengaged". On 21 April, the Bill's second reading was approved by a majority of 347 to 304.

By the third reading on 1 September, 26 of the Bill's 37 clauses had still not been debated. A fist-fight developed on the opposition benches between Home Rule and Conservative MPs. The Bill, though passed by the Commons with a slimmer majority of 30, had lost much of its credibility. At that time all legislation could be negated by the Conservative Party–dominated House of Lords, and here it failed on a vote of 41 in favour and 419 against.

== Contents ==
The bill proposed:

=== Legislature ===
A bicameral Irish parliament to control domestic affairs, made up of a Legislative Council and a Legislative Assembly.

- The Legislative Council would have 48 councillors, elected for eight-year terms in two cohorts at four-year intervals. The franchise would be based on a £20 property qualification, higher than the £10 qualification of the Assembly. The constituencies would be the three largest parliamentary boroughs (Dublin, Belfast, and Cork) and the 32 counties, except that County Cork was divided into East and West Ridings, and Counties Sligo and Leitrim were combined. Most constituencies would elect one member; the more populous, two or three.
- The Legislative Assembly would have 103 members, elected for a maximum of five years, with potential for earlier dissolution. The constituencies would be those previously used for Westminster, though the bill would reduce and redraw the Westminster constituencies. The initial franchise would be as for Westminster elections, but the parliament would have the right to alter this.
- Disagreement between the houses would be resolved after two years by majority vote of the members of the two houses voting together.

=== Executive ===
- An executive under the Lord Lieutenant of Ireland would form the Executive Committee of the Privy Council of Ireland.
- The new executive would not be responsible to the Irish parliament and the bill did not provide for a prime minister. This did not in practice mean that the executive would not be answerable to the assembly, nor did it mean that there would be no prime minister. Contemporary British enactments for the dominions contained exactly the same provisions. However, in reality governments became answerable almost immediately, and, as in the case of Canada's Constitution Act, 1867, a prime ministerial office evolved early on, even if not mentioned anywhere in law.

=== Irish MPs in Westminster ===
Whereas the First Home Rule Bill provided for no Irish MPs at Westminster, the 1893 Bill allowed for the eighty Irish MPs to sit in Westminster; this would have been a reduction from the 103 MPs who were then in the United Kingdom House of Commons.

== Passed by the Commons, defeated in the Lords ==
The Bill's second reading was passed by the House of Commons on 21 April 1893 by 347 votes to 304; the final (third) reading was passed on 1 September 1893 by 301 to 267. However, in the House of Lords the second reading was defeated on 8 September 1893 by 419 votes to 41. This was a major stumbling block for the Irish MPs because the House of Lords was controlled by the Conservative Party and there would be little chance of it getting passed by them.

Gladstone retired soon afterwards. Some historians now suggest that Gladstone was the author of his own defeats on home rule, with his secretive drafting alienating supporters, and enabling serious flaws to appear in the text of his bills.

== See also ==
- Government of Ireland Bill 1886 (First Irish Home Rule Bill)
- Government of Ireland Act 1914 (Third Irish Home Rule Bill)
- Government of Ireland Act 1920 (Fourth Irish Home Rule Bill)
- History of Ireland (1801–1923)
