= United Kingdom of Great Britain and Ireland =

Sovereign state in Northwestern Europe (1801–1922)

- 1801–1922 (Note: The state did not cease to exist after the Irish Free State seceded from the Union in 1922 but continued as the same country, renamed to its current name of the "United Kingdom of Great Britain and Northern Ireland" by the Royal and Parliamentary Titles Act 1927.)
- Flag
- Motto: "Dieu et mon droit" (French) "God and my right"
- Anthem: "God Save the King/Queen"

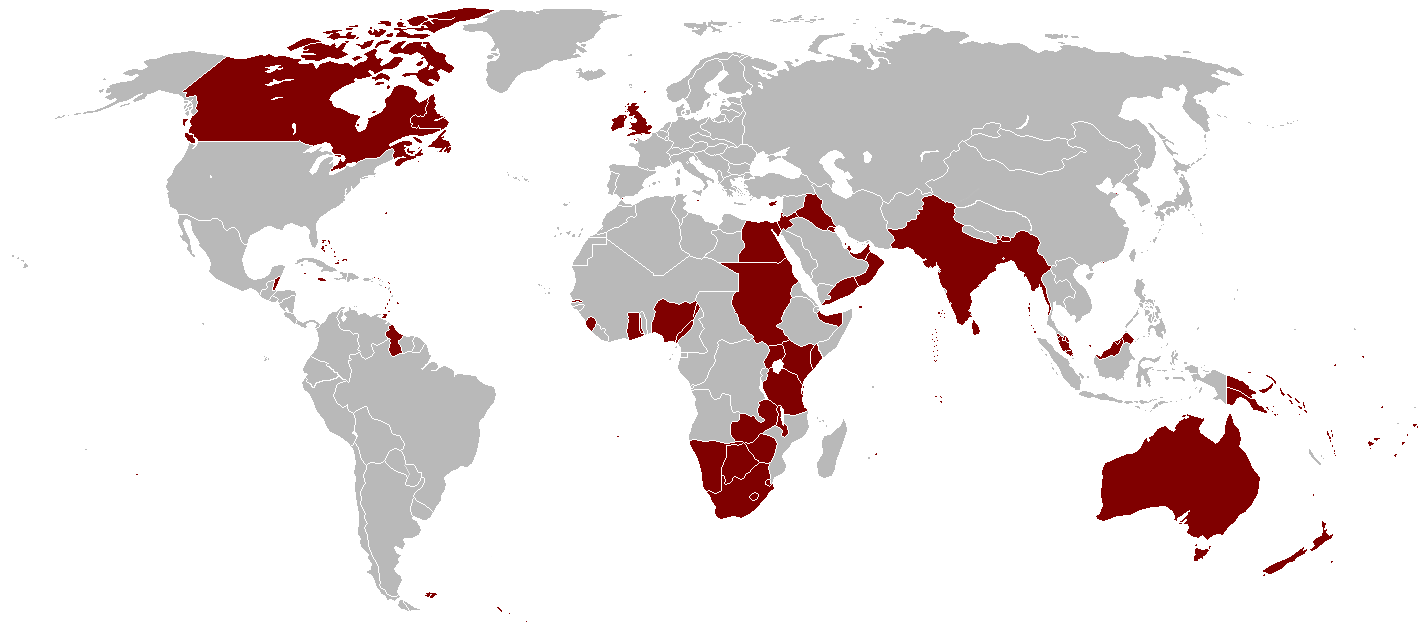
- The United Kingdom of Great Britain and Ireland with its colonies and dominions in 1921
- Capital and largest city: London; 51°30′N 0°7′W
- Official languages: English
- Demonyms: British; Britons
- Government: Unitary parliamentary constitutional monarchy
- Monarch
  - 1801–1820 (Note: Monarch of the separate Kingdoms of Great Britain and Ireland from 1760 until 1800.): George III (first)
  - 1910–1922 (Note: Continued as monarch of the United Kingdom and the Irish Free State until 1936.): George V (last)
- Prime Minister
  - 1801 (Note: Prime Minister of Great Britain from 1783 until 1801. Prime Minister of the United Kingdom for a few months in 1801.): William Pitt the Younger (first)
  - 1922 (Note: Became Prime Minister in October 1922. Continued until his resignation in 1923.): Bonar Law (last)
- Legislature: Parliament
  - Upper house: House of Lords
  - Lower house: House of Commons
- History
  - Acts of Union: 1 January 1801
  - Anglo-Irish Treaty: 6 December 1921
  - Irish Free State Constitution Act: 6 December 1922 (Note: The state did not cease to exist after the Irish Free State seceded from the Union in 1922 but continued as the same country, renamed to its current name of the "United Kingdom of Great Britain and Northern Ireland" by the Royal and Parliamentary Titles Act 1927.)
  - Titles amended: 16 April 1927

Population
  - 1911 census: 45,221,000
- Currency: Pound sterling; Irish pound (1801–26)
Preceded by	Succeeded by
Kingdom of Great Britain; Kingdom of Ireland	United Kingdom of Great Britain and Northern Ireland; Irish Free State

The United Kingdom of Great Britain and Ireland was established by the Acts of Union in 1801 that united the Kingdom of Great Britain and the Kingdom of Ireland into one unitary and sovereign state. It continued in this form until 1922, after the Irish Free State gained independence, with the remainder continuing as the United Kingdom of Great Britain and Northern Ireland.

Rapid industrialisation that began in the decades prior to the state's formation continued up until the mid-19th century. The Great Irish Famine, exacerbated by government inaction in the mid-19th century, led to demographic collapse in much of Ireland and increased calls for Irish land reform. The 19th century was an era of Industrial Revolution, and growth of trade and finance, in which Britain largely dominated the world economy. Outward migration was heavy to the principal British overseas possessions and to the United States.

The UK, from its islands off the coast of Europe, financed the coalition that defeated France during the Napoleonic Wars, and developed its dominant Royal Navy enabling the British Empire to become the foremost world power for the next century. From the defeat of Napoleon to World War I, Britain was almost continuously at peace with the Great Powers. However, the UK did engage in extensive wars in Africa and Asia, such as the Opium Wars, to extend its empire and influence. The Colonial Office and India Office ruled through a small number of administrators who managed the units of the empire locally, while local institutions developed. British India was by far the most important overseas possession. In overseas policy, the central policy was free trade, which enabled British financiers and merchants to operate successfully in otherwise independent countries, as in South America. Beginning in earnest in the second half of the 19th century, the Imperial government granted increasing autonomy to local governments in colonies where white settlers were politically dominant, with this process resulting in Canada, Australia, New Zealand, Newfoundland and South Africa becoming self-governing dominions. While these remained part of the Empire, they were permitted greater management of their internal affairs, with Britain remaining responsible for their foreign and trade policies.

With respect to other powers, the British remained non-aligned until the 20th century when the growing naval power of the German Empire came to be seen as an existential threat to the British Empire. In response, London began to cooperate with Japan, France and Russia, and moved closer to the United States. Although not formally allied with any of these powers, by 1914 British policy had all but committed to declaring war on Germany if the latter attacked France. This was realized in 1914 when Germany invaded France via Belgium, whose neutrality had been guaranteed by London. The ensuing First World War pitted the Allied and Associated Powers including the British Empire, France, Russia, Italy and the U.S. against the Central Powers of Germany, Austria-Hungary and the Ottoman Empire. The war ended in an Allied victory in 1918 but inflicted a massive cost to British manpower, materiel and treasure.

Growing desire for Irish self-governance led to the Irish War of Independence, which resulted in British recognition of the Irish Free State in 1922. Although the Free State was explicitly governed under dominion status and thus was not a fully independent polity, as a dominion it was no longer part of the United Kingdom and ceased to be represented in the Westminster Parliament. Six northeastern counties in Ireland, which since 1920 were being governed under a more limited form of home rule, opted-out of joining the Free State and remained part of the Union. In light of these changes, the British state was renamed the United Kingdom of Great Britain and Northern Ireland on 12 April 1927 with the Royal and Parliamentary Titles Act 1927. The modern-day United Kingdom is the same state, a direct continuation of what remained after the Irish Free State's secession, as opposed to being an entirely new successor state.

== 1801 to 1820 ==
=== Union of Great Britain and Ireland ===
A brief period of limited independence for the Kingdom of Ireland came to an end following the Irish Rebellion of 1798, which occurred during the British war with revolutionary France. The Kingdom of Great Britain's fear of an independent Ireland siding against them with Revolutionary France resulted in the decision to unite the two countries. This was brought about by legislation in the parliaments of both kingdoms and came into effect on 1 January 1801. The Irish had been led to believe by the British that their loss of legislative independence would be compensated with Catholic emancipation, that is, by the removal of civil disabilities placed upon Roman Catholics in both Great Britain and Ireland. Despite personal sympathy for Roman Catholics, George III believed that agreeing to Catholic Emancipation would violate his Coronation Oath to uphold the Protestant faith, and his lack of support for the initiative led the Prime Minister, William Pitt the Younger, to resign.

=== Napoleonic Wars ===
During the War of the Second Coalition (1799–1801), Britain occupied most of the French and Dutch overseas possessions, the Netherlands having become a satellite state of France in 1796, but tropical diseases claimed the lives of over 40,000 troops. When the Treaty of Amiens ended the war, Britain agreed to return most of the territories it had seized. The peace settlement was in effect only a ceasefire, and Napoleon continued to provoke the British by attempting a trade embargo on the country and by occupying the city of Hanover, capital of the Electorate, a German-speaking duchy of the Holy Roman Empire which was in a personal union with the United Kingdom. In May 1803, war was declared again. Napoleon's plans to invade Great Britain failed, chiefly due to the inferiority of his navy, and in 1805 a Royal Navy fleet led by Nelson decisively defeated the French Imperial Navy and Royal Spanish Navy at Trafalgar, which was the last significant naval action of the Napoleonic Wars.

In 1806, Napoleon issued the series of Berlin Decrees, which brought into effect the Continental System. This policy aimed to eliminate the threat from the British by closing French-controlled territory to foreign trade. The British Army remained a minimal threat to France; it maintained a standing strength of just 220,000 men at the height of the Napoleonic Wars, whereas the French Imperial Army exceeded a million men—in addition to the armies of numerous allies and several hundred thousand national guardsmen that Napoleon could draft into the French armies when they were needed. Although the Royal Navy effectively disrupted France's extra-continental trade—both by seizing and threatening French shipping and by seizing French colonial possessions—it could do nothing about France's trade with the major continental economies and posed little threat to French territory in Europe. France's population and agricultural capacity far outstripped that of the British Isles, but it was smaller in terms of industry, finance, mercantile marine and naval strength.

Napoleon expected that cutting Britain off from Continental Europe would end its economic hegemony. On the contrary Britain possessed the greatest industrial capacity in the world, and its mastery of the seas allowed it to build up considerable economic strength through trade to its possessions and the United States. The Spanish uprising in 1808 at last permitted Britain to gain a foothold on the Continent. The Duke of Wellington gradually pushed the French out of Spain, and in early 1814, as Napoleon was being driven back in the east by the Royal Prussian Army, the Imperial Austrian Army, and the Imperial Russian Army, Wellington invaded southern France. After Napoleon's surrender and exile to the Principality of Elba, peace appeared to have returned. Napoleon suddenly reappeared in 1815. The Allies united and the armies of Wellington and Gebhard Leberecht von Blücher defeated Napoleon once and for all at the Battle of Waterloo.

=== War of 1812 with the United States ===
The signing of the Treaty of Ghent ending the war with the United States (by Amédée Forestier, c. 1915)

To defeat France, Britain put heavy pressure on the United States, seizing merchant ships suspected of trading with France, and impressing sailors (conscription) born in Britain, regardless of their claimed American citizenship. British government agents armed Indigenous American tribes in Canada that were raiding American settlements on the frontier. The Americans felt humiliated and demanded war to restore their honour, despite their complete unpreparedness. The War of 1812 was a minor sideshow to the British, but the American army performed very poorly, and was unable to successfully attack Canada. In 1813, the Americans took control of Lake Erie and thereby of western Ontario, knocking most of the Indian tribes out of the war. When Napoleon surrendered for the first time in 1814, three separate forces were sent to attack the Americans in upstate New York, along the Maryland coast (burning Washington but getting repulsed at Baltimore), and up the Mississippi River to a massive defeat at the Battle of New Orleans. Each operation proved a failure with the British commanding generals killed or in disgrace. The war was a stalemate without purpose. A negotiated peace was reached at the end of 1814 that restored the prewar boundaries. British Canada celebrated its deliverance from American rule, Americans celebrated victory in a "second war of independence," and Britain celebrated its defeat of Napoleon. The treaty opened up two centuries of peace and open borders.

=== Postwar reaction: 1815–1822 ===
Britain emerged from the Napoleonic Wars a very different country than it had been in 1793. As the Industrial Revolution progressed, society changed, becoming more urban. The postwar period saw an economic slump, and poor harvests and inflation caused widespread social unrest. British leadership was intensely conservative, ever watchful of signs of revolutionary activity of the sort that had so deeply affected France. Historians have found very few signs, noting that social movements such as Methodism strongly encouraged conservative support for the political and social status quo.

The major constitutional changes included a reform of Parliament, and a sharp decline in the power and prestige of the monarchy. The prince regent, on becoming George IV in 1820 asked Parliament to divorce his wife Queen Caroline of Brunswick so that he could marry his favourite lover. Public and elite opinion strongly favoured the Queen and ridiculed the king. The fiasco helped ruin the prestige of the monarchy and it recovered a fraction of the power wielded by George III in his saner days. Historian Eugene Black says:

the damage was irrevocable. The sovereign was increasingly a symbolic contradiction in his own age. Through madness, stupidity, and immorality Victoria's three predecessors lowered the stock of monarchy. Only thirty years of the narrow domestic virtues of Queen Victoria finally retrieved the symbolic luster of the sovereign.

==== Ultra Tories: Peterloo Massacre and the Six Acts ====
The Ultra-Tories were the leaders of reaction and seemed to dominate the Tory Party, which controlled the government. Every untoward event seemed to point to a conspiracy on the left which necessitated more repression to head off another terror such as happened in the French Revolution in 1793. Historians find that the violent radical element was small and weak; there were a handful of small conspiracies involving men with few followers and careless security; they were quickly suppressed. Nevertheless, techniques of repression included the suspension of Habeas Corpus in 1817 (allowing the government to arrest and hold suspects without cause or trial). Sidmouth's Gagging Acts of 1817 heavily muzzled the opposition newspapers; the reformers switched to pamphlets and sold 50,000 a week.

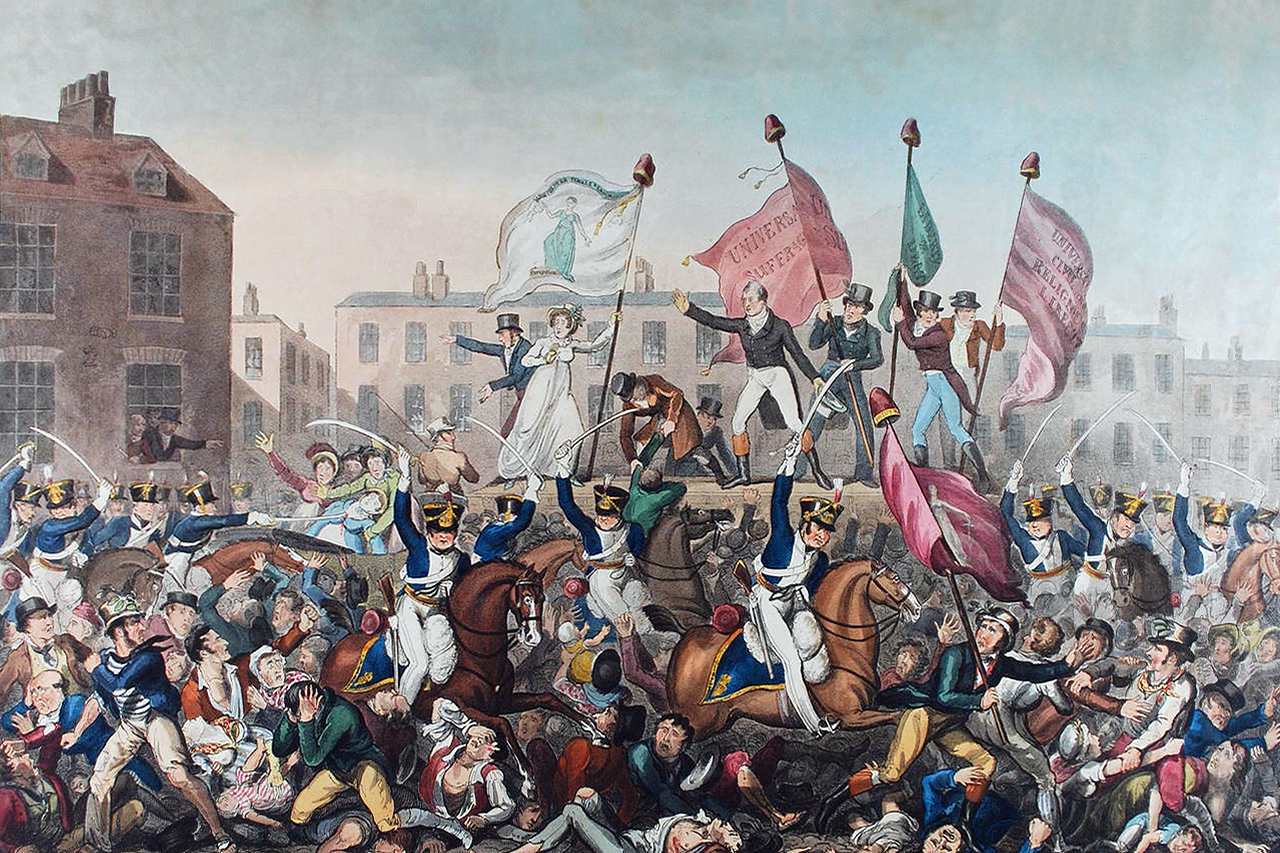
The Peterloo Massacre of 1819 resulted in 18 deaths and several hundred injured.

In industrial districts in 1819, factory workers demanded better wages, and demonstrated. The most important event was the Peterloo Massacre in Manchester, on 16 August 1819, when a local militia unit composed of landowners charged into an orderly crowd of 60,000 which had gathered to demand the reform of parliamentary representation. The crowd panicked and eleven died and hundreds were injured. The government saw the event as an opening battle against revolutionaries. In reaction Lord Liverpool's government passed the "Six Acts" in 1819. They prohibited drills and military exercises; facilitated warrants for the search for weapons; outlawed public meetings of more than 50 people, including meetings to organise petitions; put heavy penalties on blasphemous and seditious publications; imposing a fourpenny stamp act on many pamphlets to cut down the flow on news and criticism. Offenders could be harshly punished including exile in Australia. In practice the laws were designed to deter troublemakers and reassure conservatives; they were not often used.

One historian would write: "Peterloo was a blunder; it was hardly a massacre." It was a serious mistake by local authorities who did not understand what was happening. Nevertheless, it had a major impact on British opinion at the time and on history ever since as a symbol of officialdom brutally suppressing a peaceful demonstration thinking mistakenly that it was the start of an insurrection.

The Ultra-Tories peaked in strength about 1819–1822 then lost ground inside the Tory Party. They were defeated in important breakthroughs that took place in the late 1820s in terms of tolerating first dissenting Protestants. An even more decisive blow was the unexpected repeal of the many restrictions on Catholics, after widespread organised protest by the Catholic Association in Ireland under Daniel O'Connell, with support from Catholics in England. Robert Peel was alarmed at the strength of the Catholic Association, warning in 1824, "We cannot tamely sit by while the danger is hourly increasing, while a power co-ordinate with that of the Government is rising by its side, nay, daily counteracting its views." The Duke of Wellington, Britain's most famous war hero, told Peel, "If we cannot get rid of the Catholic Association, we must look to Civil War in Ireland sooner or later." Peel and Wellington agreed that to stop the momentum of the Catholic Association it was necessary to pass Catholic emancipation, which gave Catholics the vote and the right to sit in Parliament. That happened in 1829 using Whig support. Passage demonstrated that the veto power long held by the ultra-Tories no longer was operational, and significant reforms were now possible across the board. The stage was set for the Age of Reform.

== Age of Reform: 1820–1837 ==
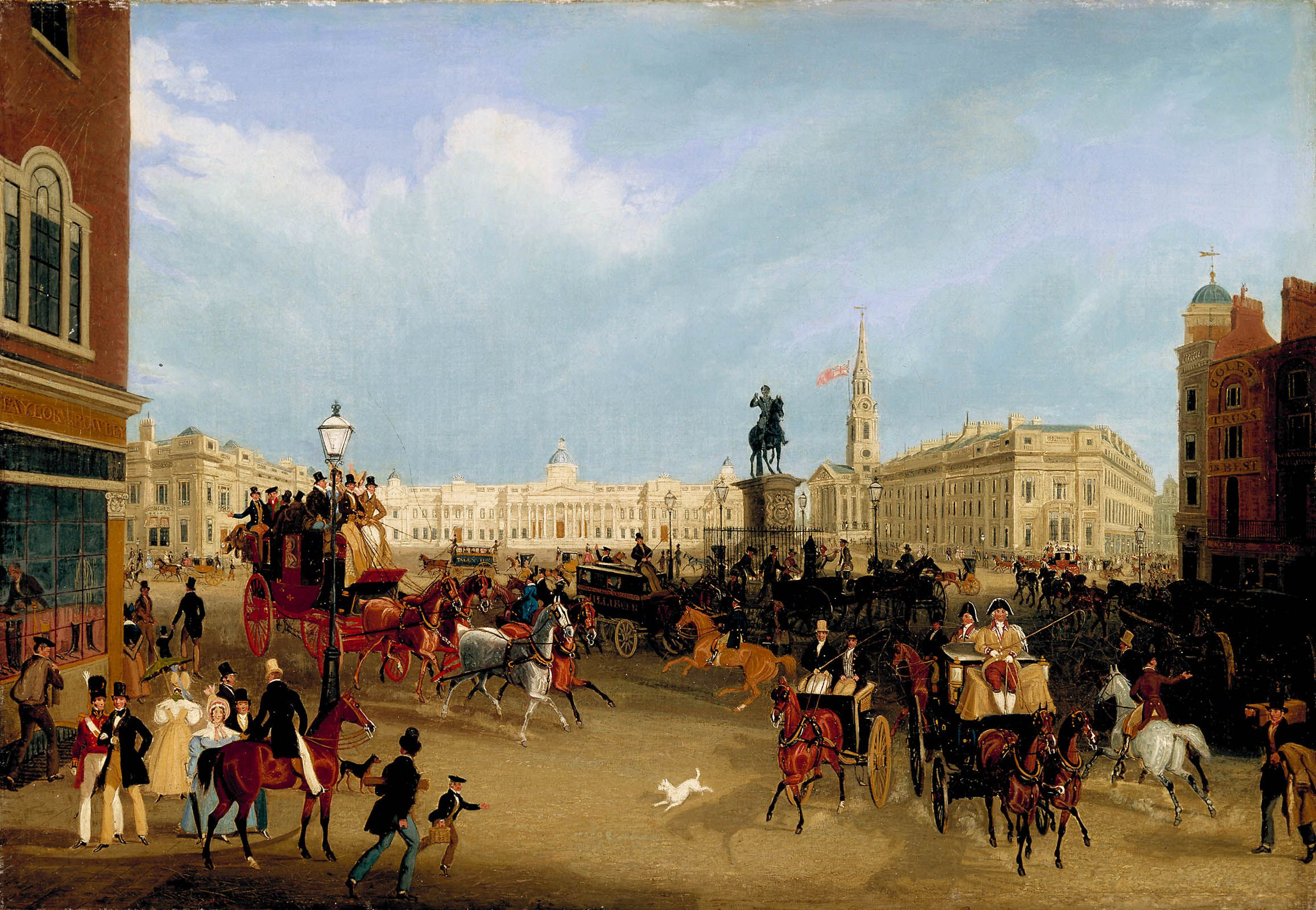
A painting by James Pollard showing Trafalgar Square before the erection of Nelson's Column

The era of reform came in a time of peace, guaranteed in considerable part by the overwhelming power of the Royal Navy. Britain engaged in only one serious war between 1815 and 1914, the Crimean War against the Russian Empire in the 1850s. That war was strictly limited in terms of scope and impact. The major result was the realisation that military medical services needed urgent reform, as advocated by the nursing leader Florence Nightingale. British diplomats, led by Lord Palmerston, promoted British nationalism, opposed reactionary regimes on the continent, helped the Spanish colonies to free themselves and worked to shut down the international slave trade.

It was a time of prosperity, population growth and better health, except in Ireland where over one million deaths were caused by the Great Famine when the potato crop failed in the 1840s. The Government did little to help the starving poor in Ireland. Along with the one million deaths, another one million would emigrate in a few short years, mostly to Britain and to the United States. The trend of emigration would continue in Ireland for decades and Ireland's population has never recovered to its pre-famine levels. The Irish language was almost wiped out. The failure of the British government to respond to the crisis in the eyes of the Irish people would lead to a growth in resentment of Britain and a rise in Irish nationalism. The famine is remembered in Ireland to this day as oppression by the British Empire.

Industrial Revolution accelerated, with textile mills joined by iron and steel, coal mining, railroads and shipbuilding. The second British Empire, founded after the loss of the Thirteen Colonies in the American Revolutionary War of the 1770s, was dramatically expanded in India, other parts of Asia, and Africa. There was little friction with other colonial powers until the 1890s. British foreign policy avoided entangling alliances.

Britain from the 1820s to the 1860s experienced a turbulent and exciting "age of reform". The century started with 15 years of war against France, ending in Wellington's triumph against Napoleon in 1815 at Waterloo. There followed 15 difficult years, in which the Tory Party, representing a small, rich landed aristocracy that was fearful of a popular revolution along the French model, employed severe repression. In the mid-1820s, however, as popular unrest increased, the government made a series of dramatic changes. The more liberal among the Tories rejected the ultraconservative "Ultra Tory" faction. The party split, key leaders switched sides, the Tories lost power, and the more liberally minded opposition Whigs took over. The Tory coalition fell apart, and it was reassembled under the banner of the Conservative Party. Numerous Tories, such as Lord Palmerston, switched over to the Whig opposition, and it became the Liberal Party.

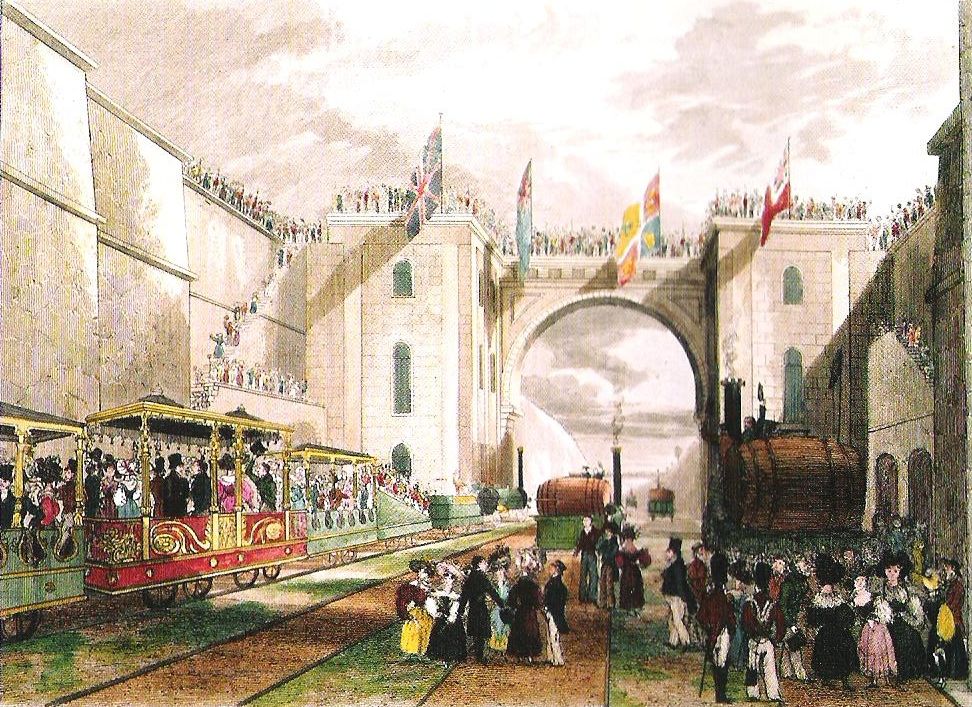
Opening of the Liverpool and Manchester Railway in 1830

Constitutionally, the 1830s marks a watershed: the end of Crown control over the cabinet. William IV in 1834 was obliged to accept a Prime Minister who had a majority in Parliament, and the Crown ever since has gone along with the majority.

The Great Reform Act 1832 came at a time of intense public and elite anxiety and broke the logjam. The parliamentary system, based on a very small electorate and large numbers of seats that were tightly controlled by a small elite, was radically reformed. For the first time the growing industrial cities had representation in Parliament. This opened the way for another decade of reform that culminated in the repeal of the Corn Laws in 1846—ending the tariff on imported grain that kept prices high for the landed aristocracy. Repeal was heavily promoted by the Anti-Corn Law League, grass roots activists led by Richard Cobden and based in the industrial cities; they demanded cheap food. There were a series of reforms of the electoral laws, expanding the number of male voters and reducing the level of corruption. The reactionary Tory element was closely linked to the Church of England, and expressed its strong hostility toward Catholics and nonconformist Protestants by restricting their political and civil rights. The Catholic started to organise in Ireland, threatening instability or even civil war, and the moderates in Parliament emancipated them. The Nonconformists were similarly freed from their restrictions. In addition to reforms at the Parliamentary level, there was a reorganisation of the governmental system in the rapidly growing cities, putting a premium on modernisation and expertise, and large electorates as opposed to small ruling cliques. A rapidly growing middle class, as well as active intellectuals, broaden the scope of reform to include humanitarian activities such as a new poor law and factory laws to protect women and children workers.

=== Protestant Nonconformists ===
In the 1790–1815 period there was an improvement in morals caused by the religious efforts by evangelicals inside the Church of England, and Dissenters or Nonconformist Protestants as people:

became wiser, better, more frugal, more honest, more respectable, more virtuous, than they ever were before." Wickedness still flourished, but the good were getting better, as frivolous habits were discarded for more serious concerns. The leading moralist of the era, William Wilberforce, saw everywhere "new proofs presenting themselves of the diffusion of religion".

Nonconformists – including Presbyterians, Congregationalists, the Baptists and the rapidly-growing Methodist denomination, as well as Quakers, Unitarians and smaller groups – were all outside the established Church of England (except in Scotland, where the established Church of Scotland was Presbyterian). They proclaimed a devotion to hard work, temperance, frugality and upward mobility, with which historians today largely agree. A major Unitarian magazine, the Christian Monthly Repository asserted in 1827:

Throughout England a great part of the more active members of society, who have the most intercourse with the people have the most influence over them, are Protestant Dissenters. These are manufacturers, merchants and substantial tradesman, or persons who are in the enjoyment of a competency realised by trade, commerce and manufacturers, gentlemen of the professions of law and physic, and agriculturalists, of that class particularly who live upon their own freehold. The virtues of temperance, frugality, prudence and integrity promoted by religious Nonconformity... assist the temporal prosperity of these descriptions of persons, as they tend also to lift others to the same rank in society.

The Nonconformists suffered under a series of disabilities, some of which were symbolic and others were painful, and they were all deliberately imposed to weaken the dissenting challenge to Anglican orthodoxy. The Nonconformists allied with the Whigs to demand civil and religious equality. Grievances included a 1753 law that, to be legally recognised, marriage had to take place in the Anglican parish church. The Anglican parish register was the only legally accepted birth documentation. The Anglican parish controlled the only religious burial grounds. The Universities of Oxford and Cambridge had to reject non-Anglican applicants. At the local level, everyone who lived in the boundaries of an Anglican church was required to pay taxes to support the parish. The Test and Corporation laws required all national and local government officials had to attend Anglican church services. In February 1828, Whig leader Lord John Russell, presented petitions assembled by the main Nonconformist pressure group, the United Committee, which represented Congregationalist, Baptists and Unitarians. Their demand was the immediate repeal of the hated laws. Wellington and Peel originally were opposed, but then tried to compromise. They finally gave, splitting the Tory party, and signaling that the once unstoppable power of the Anglican establishment was now unexpectedly fragile and vulnerable to challenge.

=== Foreign policy ===
Three men shaped British foreign policy from 1810 to 1860, with only a few interruptions, Viscount Castlereagh (especially 1812–1822). George Canning (especially 1807–1829) and Viscount Palmerston (especially 1830–1865). For a complete list, see Secretary of State for Foreign and Commonwealth Affairs.

The coalition that defeated Napoleon was financed by Britain, and held together at the Congress of Vienna in 1814–1815. It successfully broke Napoleon's comeback attempt in 1815. Castlereagh played a central role at Vienna, along with Austrian leader Klemens von Metternich. While many Europeans wanted to punish France heavily, Castlereagh insisted on a mild peace, with the Kingdom of France to pay 700 million livre in indemnities and lose the territory seized after 1791. He realised that harsher terms would lead to a dangerous reaction in France, and now that the conservative old-fashioned Bourbons were back in power, they were no longer a threat to attempt to conquer all of Europe. Indeed, Castlereagh emphasised the need for a "balance of power", whereby no nation would be powerful enough to threaten the conquest of Europe the way Napoleon had. Vienna ushered in a century of peace, with no great wars and few important localised ones until the Crimean War (1853–1856). Prussia, Austria, and Russia, as absolute monarchies, tried to suppress liberalism wherever it might occur. Britain first took a Reactionary position at the Congress of Vienna in 1815, but relented and broke ranks with the absolute monarchies by 1820. Britain intervened in Portugal in 1826 to defend a constitutional government there and recognising the independence of Spain's American colonies after their wars of independence in 1824. British merchants and financiers and, later, railway builders, played major roles in the economies of most Latin American nations.

=== Age of Reform ===
==== Main achievements ====
In the 1825 to 1867 era, widespread public demonstrations, some of them violent, escalated to demand reform. The ruling Tories were dead set against anything smacking of democracy or popular rule and favoured severe punishment of demonstrators, as exemplified by the Peterloo Massacre in Manchester in 1819. The Tory ranks were cracking, however, especially when Robert Peel (1788–1830) broke away on several critical issues. Nevertheless, the Whig party gets most of the credit. The middle classes, often led by nonconformist Protestants, turned against the Tories and scored the greatest gains. For example, symbolic restrictions on nonconformists called the Test Acts were abolished in 1828. Much more controversial was the repeal of severe discrimination against Roman Catholics after the Irish Catholics organised, and threatened rebellion, forcing major concessions in 1829.

Financial reform, led by William Huskisson and Peel, rationalised the tariff system, and culminated in the great repeal of the tariffs on imported grain in 1846, much to the dismay of grain farmers. The 1846 repeal of the Corn Laws established free trade as the basic principle by which British merchants came to dominate the globe, and brought cheap food to British workers. A depoliticised civil service based on merit replaced patronage policies rewarding jobs for partisan efforts. Efficiency was a high priority in government, with the goal of low taxation. Overall, taxation was about 10%, the lowest in any modern nation.

Foreign policy became moralistic and hostile to the reactionary powers on the continent, teaming up with the United States to block European colonialism in the New World through the Monroe Doctrine of 1823. Slavery was abolished throughout the British Empire. The Royal Navy stepped up efforts to stop international trade in slaves.

Municipal reform was a necessity for the rapidly growing industrial cities still labouring under a hodgepodge of centuries-old laws and traditions. When Peel took over the Home Office, he abolished the espionage and cruel punishments, ended the death penalty for most crimes, and inaugurated the first system of professional police—who in London to this day are still called "Bobbies" in his honour. The Municipal Corporations Act 1835 modernised urban government, which previously had been controlled by closed bodies dominated by Tories. Over 200 old municipal corporations were abolished and replaced with 179 elected borough councils. Elections were to be based on registered voters, city finances had to be audited in a uniform fashion, and city officials were elected by the local taxpayers.

By far the most important of the reforms was the democratisation of Parliament, which began in a small but highly controversial fashion with the Reform Act 1832. The main impact was to drastically reduce the number of very small constituencies, with only a few dozen voters under the control of a local magnate. Industrial cities gained many of the seats but were still significantly underrepresented in Parliament. The 1831–1832 battle over parliamentary reform was, "a year probably unmatched in English history for the sweep and intensity of its excitement." Every few years an incremental enlargement of the electorate was made by Parliament, reaching practically all male voters by the 1880s, and all the women by 1928. Both parties introduced paid professional organisers who supervised the mobilisation of all possible support in each constituency; about 80% of the men voted. The Tories discovered that their conservatism had an appeal to skilled workers, and also to women, hundreds of thousands of whom were organised by the Primrose League. Women's suffrage was not on the agenda. The abolition of the House of Lords, while often discussed, was never necessary because the upper house repeatedly retreated in the face of determined House of Commons action. After defeating the first two versions of the Reform Act 1832, the Whigs got the king to agree to appoint as many new peers as was necessary to change the outcome. He promised to do so, but convinced the Lords it would be much wiser for them to approve the law.

==== Political process ====
A weak ruler as regent (1811–1820) and king (1820–1830), George IV let his ministers take full charge of government affairs. He was a deeply unpopular playboy. When he tried to get Parliament to pass a law allowing him to divorce his wife Queen Caroline, public opinion strongly supported her.

After four decades of rule by Pittites and Tories the first breakthrough in reform came in the removal by a Tory government of restrictions on the careers of Protestant Nonconformists in the repeal in 1828 of the laws that required Anglican church membership for many academic and government positions. Much more intense was the long battle over the civil rights of Roman Catholics. Catholic emancipation came in 1829, which removed the most substantial restrictions on Roman Catholics in Great Britain and Ireland. The Duke of Wellington, as Tory prime minister, decided that the surging crisis in largely Catholic Ireland necessitated some relief for the Catholics, although he had long opposed the idea. The other main Tory leader was Robert Peel, who suddenly reversed himself on the Catholic issue and was roundly denounced and permanently distrusted by the Ultra Tory faction of die-hards.

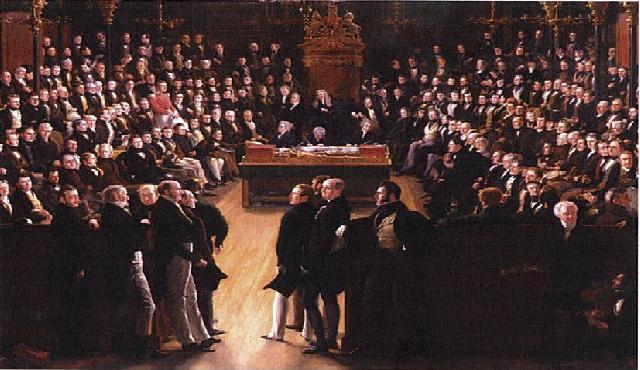
The House of Commons, 1833 by George Hayter commemorates the passing of the Reform Act 1832. It depicts the first session of the newly reformed House of Commons on 5 February 1833. In the foreground, the leading statesmen from the Lords: Charles Grey, 2nd Earl Grey (1764–1845), William Lamb, 2nd Viscount Melbourne (1779–1848) and the Whigs on the left; and Arthur Wellesley, 1st Duke of Wellington (1769–1852) and the Tories on the right.

Earl Grey, prime minister from 1830 to 1834, and his rejuvenated Whig Party enacted a series of major reforms: the poor law was updated, child labour restricted and, most important, the Reform Act 1832 refashioned the British electoral system. In 1832 parliament abolished slavery in the Empire with the Slavery Abolition Act 1833. The government purchased all the slaves for £20,000,000 (the money went to rich plantation owners who mostly lived in England), and freed the slaves, most of whom were in the Caribbean sugar islands.

The Whigs became champions of parliamentary reform by making the Reform Act 1832 their signature measure. It significantly reduced the numbers of "rotten and pocket boroughs" (where elections were controlled by powerful families), and instead redistributed seats on the basis of population. It also broadened the franchise, adding 217,000 voters to an electorate of 435,000 in England and Wales. The main effect of the act was to weaken the power of the landed gentry, and enlarge the power of the professional and business middle-class, which now for the first time had a significant voice in Parliament. However, at this point the great majority of manual workers, clerks and farmers did not have enough property to qualify to vote. Many of them received the vote in 1867. The aristocracy continued to dominate the Church of England, the most prestigious military and naval posts, and high society, but not business, industry or finance. In terms of national governmental policy, the democratic wishes of the entire people had become decisive.

Most historians emphasise the central importance of the legislation of the 1830s–60s, although there was a dissenting minority of scholars in the 1960s and 1970s who argued against deep meanings of Whiggish progress because each of the reforms was relatively minor in itself. Historian Richard Davis concludes that the scholarship of the 1970s represented "a vindication of the main outlines of the old "Whig interpretation". That is, the Reform Act 1832 was a response to mounting popular pressure. It was "the culmination of a long historical process, and an important turning point in the emergence of a more liberal and broadly based political system... it deserves its old designation of 'Great.'"

David Thompson has stressed the revolutionary nature of the entire package of reforms:

In all these ways—the organization of the new police (by Peel as Home Secretary in the 1820s), the new Poor Law, and in the new municipal councils—the pattern of government in England was changed fundamentally within a single decade. In conjunction with the removal of religious disabilities, these reforms laid the structural foundation for a new kind of State in Britain: a State in which the electoral rights and civil rights of citizens were extended and given greater legal protection, but in which the ordinary citizen was subjected to a much greater degree of administrative interference, direction, and control from the centre. The most spectacular element in this whole process—the Reform Bill of 1832—ensured that the state should also be partially democratized at the centre. The full significance of 1832 in the history of the country is appreciated only if it is seen as the central change in this mini-sided transformation of an agricultural nation ruled by squires, parsons, and the wealthy landowners into an industrial nation dominated by the classes produced by industrial expansion and commercial enterprise.

==== Chartism ====
Chartism was a large-scale popular protest movement that emerged in response to the failure of the Reform Act 1832 to give the vote to the working class. It lacked middle-class support, and it failed repeatedly. Activists denounced the "betrayal" of the working classes and the "sacrificing" of their "interests" by the "misconduct" of the government. In 1838, Chartists issued the People's Charter demanding manhood suffrage, equal-sized election districts, voting by ballots, payment of Members of Parliament (so that poor men could serve), annual parliaments, and abolition of property requirements. The ruling class saw the movement as dangerous. Multiple large peaceful meetings across England demanded change but the Chartists were unable to force serious constitutional debate. In July 1839, however, the House of Commons rejected, by 235 votes to 46, a motion to debate the Chartists' national petition, bearing 1.3 million signatures. Historians see Chartism as both a continuation of the 18th century fight against corruption and as a new stage in demands for democracy in an industrial society.

=== Prime ministers ===
Prime ministers of the period included: William Pitt the Younger, Lord Grenville, Duke of Portland, Spencer Perceval, Lord Liverpool, George Canning, Lord Goderich, Duke of Wellington, Lord Grey, Lord Melbourne, Lord Palmerston and Robert Peel.

The aristocracy remained dominant: there were 200 hereditary peers in the House of Lords in 1860; by 1837 they numbered 428; in 1901, there were 592. The number rose to 622 by 1910. Reform legislation in 1832, 1867, 1884 and 1918 weakened the aristocracy in terms of its control of the House of Commons. However, it ran the government: of the ten prime ministers under Victoria, six were peers. The seventh was the son of a duke. Two (Peel and Gladstone) emerged from the business community and only one (Disraeli) was a self-made man. Of the 227 cabinet members between 1832 and 1905, 139 were sons of peers.

Field Marshal Arthur Wellesley, 1st Duke of Wellington, who defeated Napoleon, served as the leader of the Conservative party in the House of Lords, 1828–1846. Some writers have belittled him as a befuddled reactionary, but a consensus reached in the late 20th century depicts him as a shrewd operator who hid his cleverness behind the facade of a poorly-informed old soldier. Wellington worked to transform the Lords from unstinting support of the Crown to an active player in political manoeuvring, with a commitment to the landed aristocracy. He used his London residence as a venue for intimate dinners and private consultations, together with extensive correspondence that kept him in close touch with party leaders in the Commons and with leading figures in the Lords. He gave public rhetorical support to Ultra-Tory anti-reform positions, but then deftly changed positions toward the party's centre, especially when Peel needed support from the upper house. Wellington's success was based on the 44 peers elected from Scotland and Ireland, whose election he controlled.

Charles Grey, 2nd Earl Grey, had promoted reform of Parliament since the 1790s, always to be defeated by the Ultra-Tories. The breakthrough came in his success in passage of the Reform Act 1832. He sought this as the final step of reform, rather than a first step in a long process, emphasising the urgent need in 1832 to settle the intense and growing political unrest across Britain. He believed that the respectable classes deserved to have their demands for greater representation met, but he refused to extend political power to the mass of the lower middle class and working class, saying that they were not ready to be trusted with it. He wanted to preserve the basic elements of the existing constitution by removing obvious abuses, thinking that this would strengthen aristocratic leadership. He persuaded the king to promise to create enough new peers to force the bill through the House of Lords. The king made the promise while also advising the peers to stop blocking the bill. The Reform Act 1832 was Grey's principal achievement; it reflects his pragmatic, moderate and conservative character, as well as his parliamentary skills of timing and persuasion. His cabinet was a coalition of diverse interests, so in 1834 when it divided over the Irish church question he resigned.

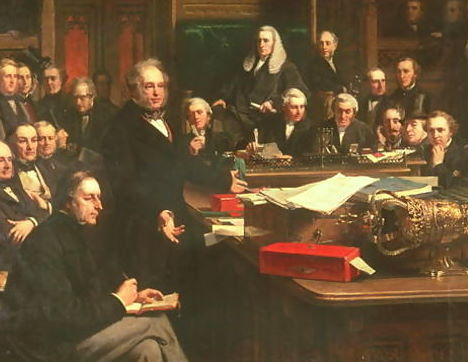
Lord Palmerston addressing the House of Commons during the debates on the Treaty of France, February 1860

Henry John Temple, 3rd Viscount Palmerston, played the dominant role in shaping British foreign-policy as Foreign Secretary (1830–1834, 1835–1841 and 1846–1851) and as prime minister (1855–1858, 1859–1865). He served as Secretary at War in Tory governments for two decades, but switched over to the Whig coalition in 1830. The Tories despised him thereafter as a turncoat, and many of the more radical Whigs were distrustful of his basically conservative views that saw him fainthearted about or opposed to reform measures. He typically warned on the one hand against delays and on the other hand against excessive enthusiasm for reforms, preferring compromise. He was keenly sensitive to public opinion, and indeed often shapes it through his dealings with newspaper editors. When he sensed that public demand had reached an unstoppable momentum, he would work for a watered-down reform. He routinely gave the same advice to foreign governments. Diplomats across Europe took careful note of his move from the Tories to the Whigs, and suspected him of sympathy with the reform movements which were setting off upheavals in France, Belgium and elsewhere, and which frightened the reactionary governments of the major powers Russia, Austria and Prussia. In reality he drew his foreign policy ideals from Canning. His main goals were to promote British strategic and economic interests worldwide, remain aloof from European alliances, mediate peace in Europe and use British naval power sparingly as needed. He worried most about France as an adversary, although he collaborated with them as in securing the independence of Belgium from the Kingdom of the Netherlands. He much preferred liberal and reform-oriented nations to reactionary powers. He placed a high priority on building up British strength in India, He spoke often of pride in British nationalism, which found favour in public opinion and gave him a strong basis of support outside Parliament.

=== Reformers ===
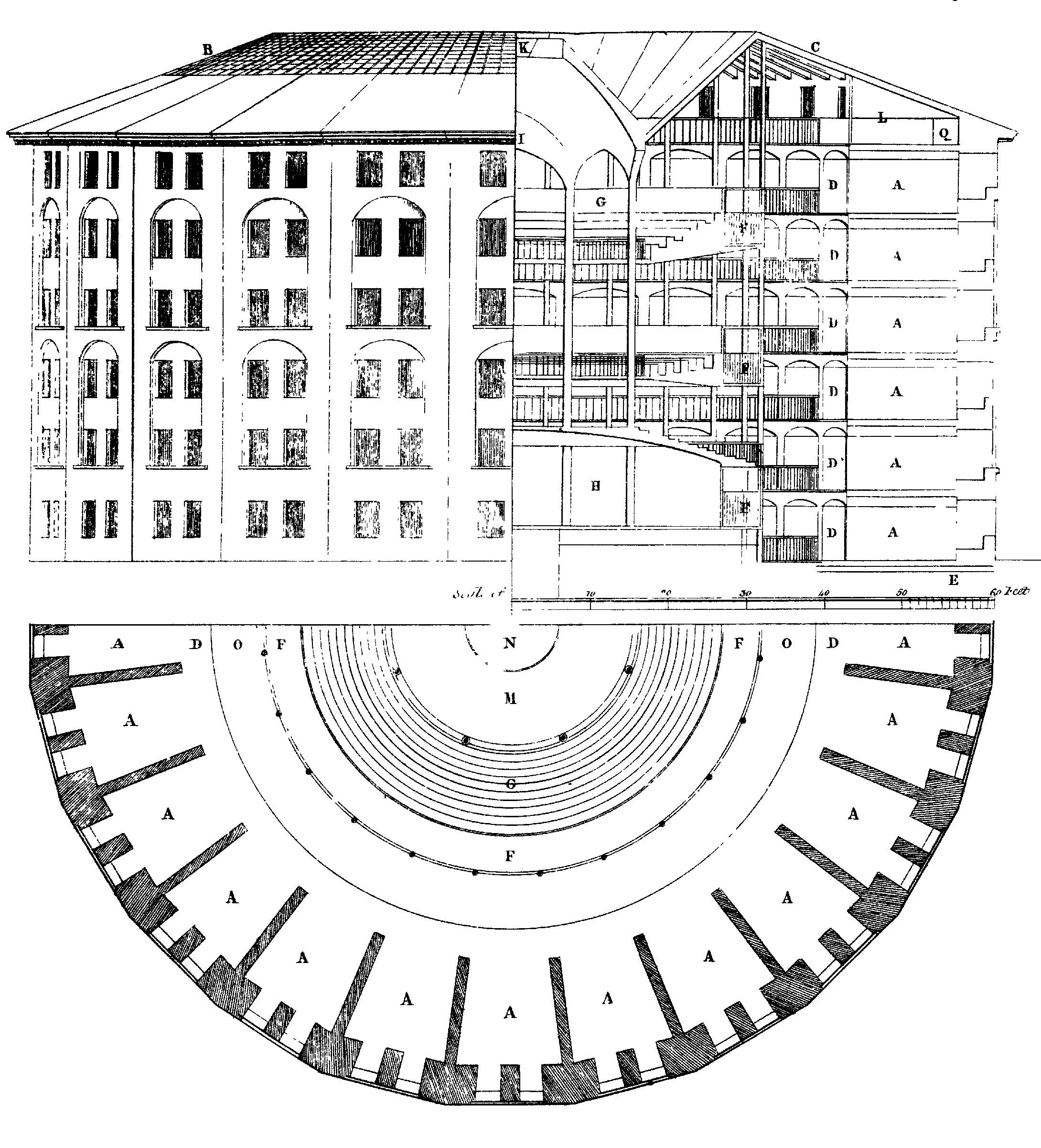
Jeremy Bentham's panopticon prison (1791 drawing by Willey Reveley)

Jeremy Bentham (1748–1832) was an intellectual who focused on reforming English law. He was a leading promoter of utilitarianism as a working philosophy of action. The "greatest happiness principle", or the principle of utility, forms the cornerstone of Bentham's thought. By "happiness", he understood a predominance of "pleasure" over "pain". He is best known for his inspiration of the radical forces, helping them define those reforms that were most urgently needed and how they could be implemented. His intellectual leadership helped achieve many of the key legal, political, economic and social reforms of the 1830s and 1840s. He especially influenced the reform of education, prisons, poor laws, legal procedures and parliamentary representation.

John Bright (1811–1889) built on his middle-class Quaker heritage and his collaboration with Richard Cobden to promote all varieties of humanitarian and parliamentary reform. They started with a successful campaign against the Corn Laws. These were tariffs on imported food that kept up the price of grain to placate Tory landowners. The major factor in the cost of living was the price of food, and the Corn Laws kept the price high. Bright was a powerful speaker, which boosted him to election to Parliament in 1843. His radical program included extension of the suffrage, land reform and reduction of taxation. He opposed factory reforms, labour unions and controls on hours for workers, women and children, arguing that government intervention in economic life was always mistaken. He opposed wars and imperialism. His unremitting hostility to the Crimean war led to his defeat for reelection in 1857. He was soon reelected from Birmingham, leading a national campaign for parliamentary reform to enlarge the suffrage to reach the working man. He was intensely moralistic and distrusted the integrity of his opponents. He loathed the aristocracy that continued to rule Britain. He held a few minor cabinet positions, but his reputation rests on his organising skills and his rhetorical leadership for reform.

One historian summarised Bright's achievements:

John Bright was the greatest of all parliamentary orators. He had many political successes. Along with Richard Cobden, he conducted the campaign which led to the repeal of the Corn Laws. He did more than any other man to prevent the intervention of this country (Britain) on the side of the South during the American Civil War, and he headed the reform agitation in 1867 which brought the industrial working class within the pale of the constitution. It was Bright who made possible the Liberal party of Gladstone, Asquith and Lloyd George, and the alliance between middle-class idealism and trade unionism, which he promoted, still lives in the present-day Labour Party.

== Victorian era ==
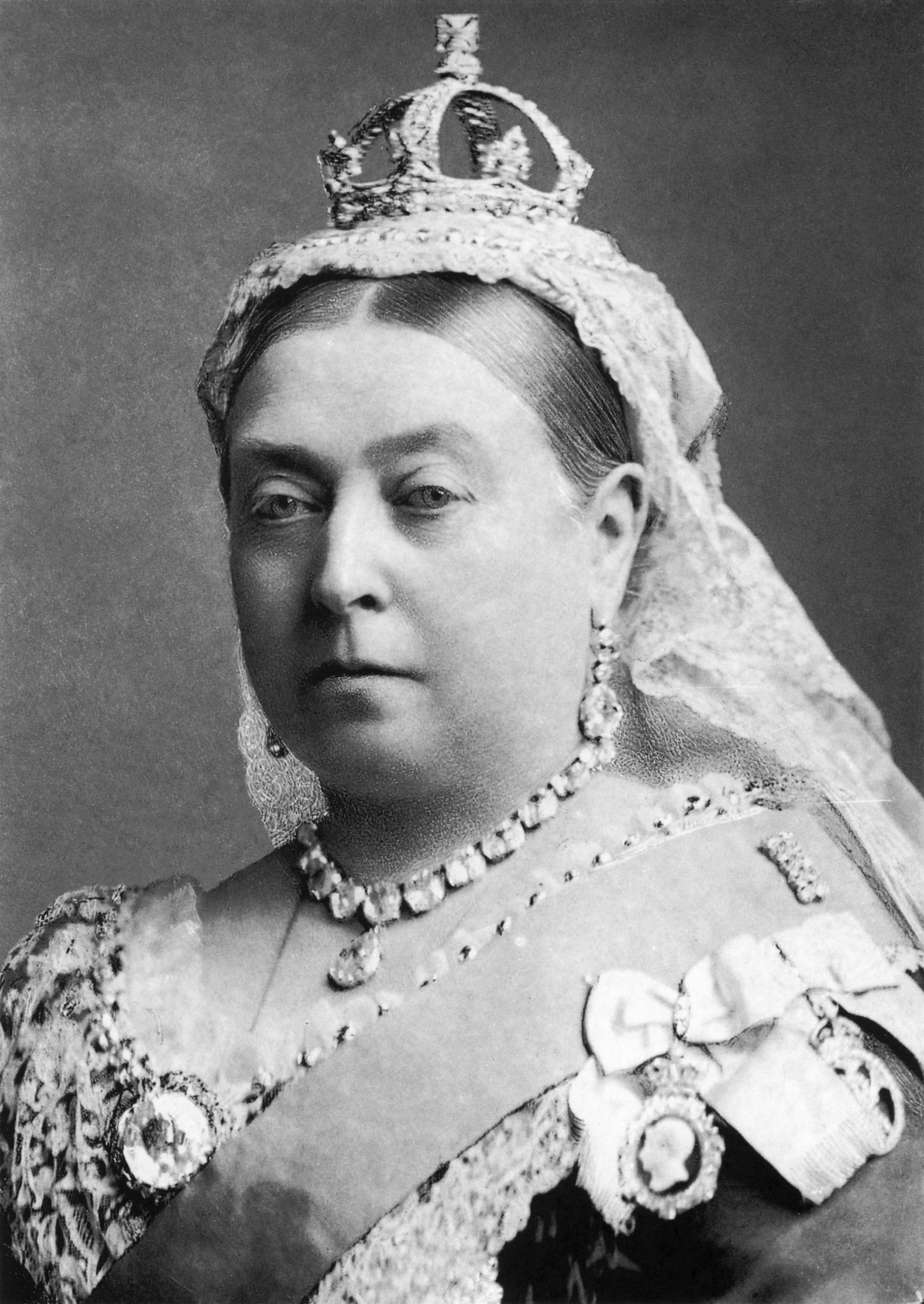
Queen Victoria reigned from 1837 to 1901.

The Victorian era was the period of Queen Victoria's rule between 1837 and 1901 which signified the height of the British Industrial Revolution and the apex of the British Empire. Scholars debate whether the Victorian period—as defined by a variety of sensibilities and political concerns that have come to be associated with the Victorians—actually begins with the passage of the Reform Act 1832. The era was preceded by the Regency era and succeeded by the Edwardian period. Victoria became queen in 1837 at age 18. Her long reign saw Britain reach the zenith of its economic and political power, with the introduction of steam ships, railways, photography and the telegraph. Britain again remained mostly inactive in Continental politics.

The Queen played a small role in politics, but became the iconic symbol of the nation, the empire and proper, restrained behaviour. Her success as ruler was due to the power of the self-images she successively portrayed of innocent young woman, devoted wife and mother, suffering and patient widow, and grandmotherly matriarch.

=== Foreign policy ===
==== Free trade imperialism ====
After the defeat of France in the Revolutionary and Napoleonic Wars (1792–1815), the UK emerged as the principal naval and imperial power of the 19th century (with London the largest city in the world from about 1830). Unchallenged at sea, British dominance was later described as Pax Britannica ("British Peace"), a period of relative peace in Europe and the world (1815–1914). By the time of the Great Exhibition of 1851, Britain was described as the "workshop of the world". Using the imperial tools of free trade and financial investment, it exerted major influence on many countries outside Europe and the empire, especially in Latin America and Asia. Thus Britain had both a formal Empire based on British rule as well as an informal one based on the British pound.

==== Russia, France and the Ottoman Empire ====
One nagging fear was the possible collapse of the Ottoman Empire. It was well understood that a collapse of that country would set off a scramble for its territory and possibly plunge Britain into war. To head that off Britain sought to keep the Russians from occupying Constantinople and taking over the Bosphorus Strait, as well as from threatening India via Afghanistan. In 1853, Britain and France intervened in the Crimean War against Russia. Despite mediocre generalship, they managed to capture the Russian port of Sevastopol, compelling Tsar Nicholas I to ask for peace.

The next Russo-Ottoman war in 1877 led to another European intervention, although this time at the negotiating table. The Congress of Berlin blocked Russia from imposing the harsh Treaty of San Stefano on the Ottoman Empire. Despite its alliance with the French in the Crimean War, Britain viewed the Second Empire of Napoleon III with some distrust, especially as the emperor built up his navy, expanded his empire and took up a more active foreign policy.

==== American Civil War ====
During the American Civil War (1861–1865), British leaders and elite favoured the Confederate States of America, a major source of cotton for textile mills. Prince Albert was effective in defusing a war scare in late 1861 over the Trent Affair. The mostly working-class British people generally favoured the Union. What little cotton was available came from New York City, as the Union blockade of the Confederacy shut down 95% of Southern exports to Britain. Trade flourished with the Union and many young men crossed the Atlantic to join the Union Army. In September 1862, President Abraham Lincoln announced the Emancipation Proclamation would be issued in 90 days, thus making abolition of slavery a war goal. Britain was long opposed to slavery, itself having abolished it some three decades earlier, and any possibility of its intervention on behalf of the Confederacy ended.

British companies built and operated fast blockade runners to ship arms to and built warships for the Confederacy at considerable profit. London ignored American complaints that it allowed the selling of arms and building of warships for the Confederacy. Both blockade runners and warships caused a major diplomatic row that was partially resolved in the Alabama Claims in 1872, in the Americans' favour by payment of reparations only for damages caused by British-built Confederate warships.

==== Empire expands ====
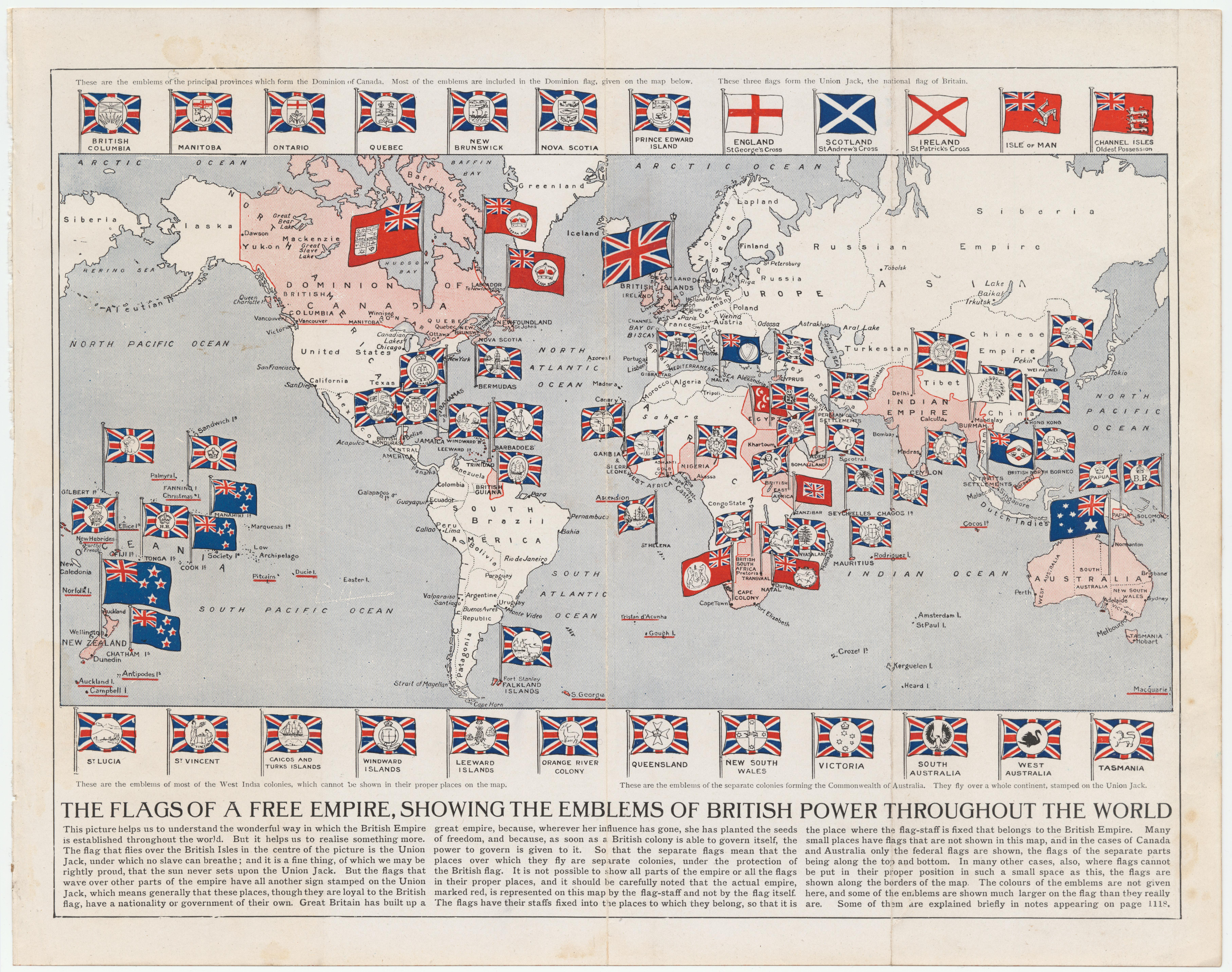
The British Empire in 1910

Starting in 1867, Britain united most of its North American colonies as the Dominion of Canada, giving it self-government and responsibility for its own defence, although Canada did not have an independent foreign policy until 1931. The second half of the 19th century saw a scramble for Africa among the European powers. There was talk of war with France over the Fashoda Incident of 1898.

The rise of the German Empire after 1871 posed a new challenge, for it (along with the United States), threatened to usurp Britain's place as the world's foremost industrial power. Germany acquired a number of colonies in Africa and the Pacific, but Chancellor Otto von Bismarck succeeded in achieving general peace through his balance of power strategy. When William II became German Emperor in 1888, he discarded Bismarck, began using bellicose language, and planned to build a navy to rival Britain's. Britain realised its isolation policy was useless as large-scale alliances emerged. It restored good relations with France and the United States, and ended tensions with Russia, while the confrontation with Germany became a naval race.

Ever since Britain had wrested control of the Cape Colony from the Netherlands during the Napoleonic Wars, it had co-existed with Dutch settlers who had migrated further away from the Cape and created two republics of their own: the South African Republic and the Orange Free State. The British imperial vision called for control over these new countries, and the Afrikaans-speaking "Boers" (or "Afrikaners") fought back in the War in 1899–1902. Outgunned by a mighty empire, the Boer Commandos waged a guerrilla war (which certain other British territories would later employ to attain independence). This gave the British Armed Forces a difficult fight, but their weight of numbers, superior equipment and often brutal tactics, eventually brought about a British victory. The war had been costly in human rights and was widely criticised by Liberals in Britain and worldwide. However, the United States gave London its support. The Boer republics were merged with Cape Colony and Natal into the Union of South Africa in 1910; this had internal self-government, but its foreign policy was controlled by London and it was an integral part of the British Empire.

=== Leadership ===
Prime ministers of the period included: Lord Melbourne, Robert Peel, Lord John Russell, Lord Derby, Lord Aberdeen, Lord Palmerston, Benjamin Disraeli, William Ewart Gladstone, Lord Salisbury and Lord Rosebery.

Disraeli and Gladstone dominated the politics of the late 19th century, Britain's golden age of parliamentary government. They long were idolised, but historians in recent decades have become much more critical, especially regarding Disraeli.

==== Disraeli ====
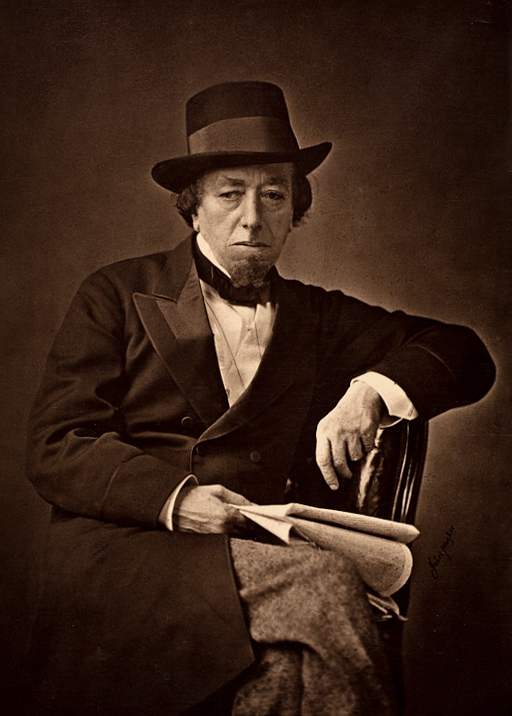
Benjamin Disraeli

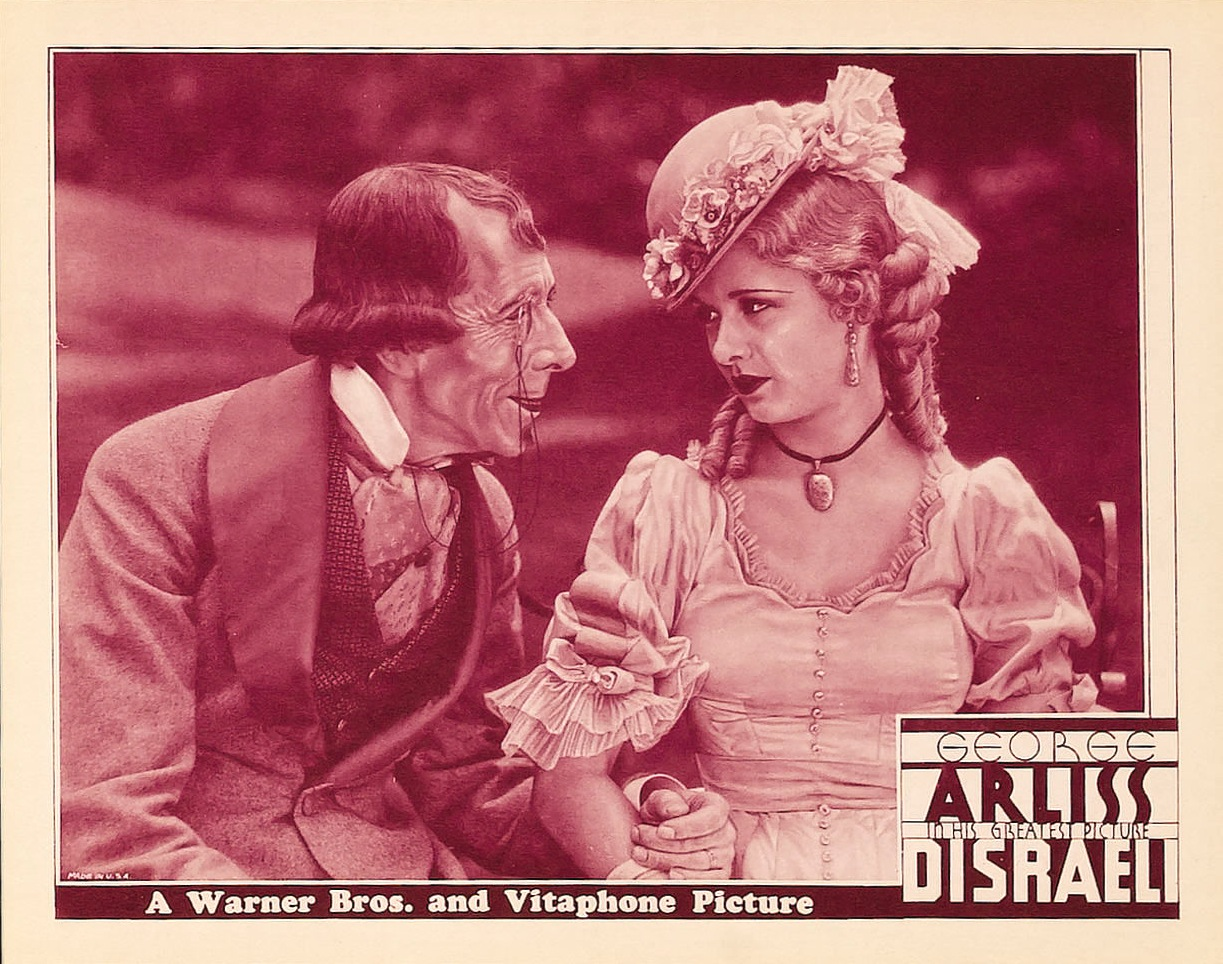
Lobby card for the 1929 film Disraeli, showing actor George Arliss, who won an Oscar for his portrayal of the prime minister

Benjamin Disraeli, prime minister in 1868 and 1874–80, remains an iconic hero of the Conservative Party. He was typical of the generation of British leaders who matured in the 1830s and 1840s. He was concerned with threats to established political, social and religious values and elites; he emphasised the need for national leadership in response to radicalism, uncertainty and materialism. Disraeli was especially noted for his enthusiastic support for expanding and strengthening the British Empire, in contrast to Gladstone's negative attitude toward imperialism. Gladstone denounced Disraeli's policies of territorial aggrandisement, military pomp and imperial symbolism (such as making the Queen Empress of India), saying it did not fit a modern commercial and Christian nation. However, Gladstone himself did not turn down attractive opportunities to expand the empire in Egypt.

Disraeli drummed up support by warnings of a supposed Russian threat to India that sank deep into the Conservative mindset. His reputation as the "Tory democrat" and promoter of the welfare state fell away as historians showed that Disraeli had few proposals for social legislation in 1874–1880, and that the Reform Act 1867 did not reflect a vision of Conservatism for the unenfranchised working man. However, he did work to reduce class antagonism, for as Perry notes, "When confronted with specific problems, he sought to reduce tension between town and country, landlords and farmers, capital and labour, and warring religious sects in Britain and Ireland—in other words, to create a unifying synthesis."

In the popular culture, Disraeli was a great political hero, a status that persisted for decades after his death. For British music hall patrons in the 1880s and 1890s, "xenophobia and pride in empire" were reflected in the halls' most popular political heroes: all were Conservatives and Disraeli stood out above all, even decades after his death, while Gladstone was used as a villain. After 1920, historical films helped maintain the political status quo by sustaining an establishment viewpoint that emphasised the greatness of monarchy, empire and tradition as they created "a facsimile world where existing values were invariably validated by events in the film and where all discord could be turned into harmony by an acceptance of the status quo." Disraeli was an especially popular film hero: "historical dramas favoured Disraeli over Gladstone and, more substantively, promulgated an essentially deferential view of democratic leadership." Stage and screen actor George Arliss (1868–1946) was famous for his portrayals of Disraeli, winning the Oscar as best actor for 1929's Disraeli. Arliss "personified the kind of paternalistic, kindly, homely statesmanship that appealed to a significant proportion of the cinema audience… Even workers attending Labour party meetings deferred to leaders with an elevated social background who showed they cared.".

==== Gladstone ====
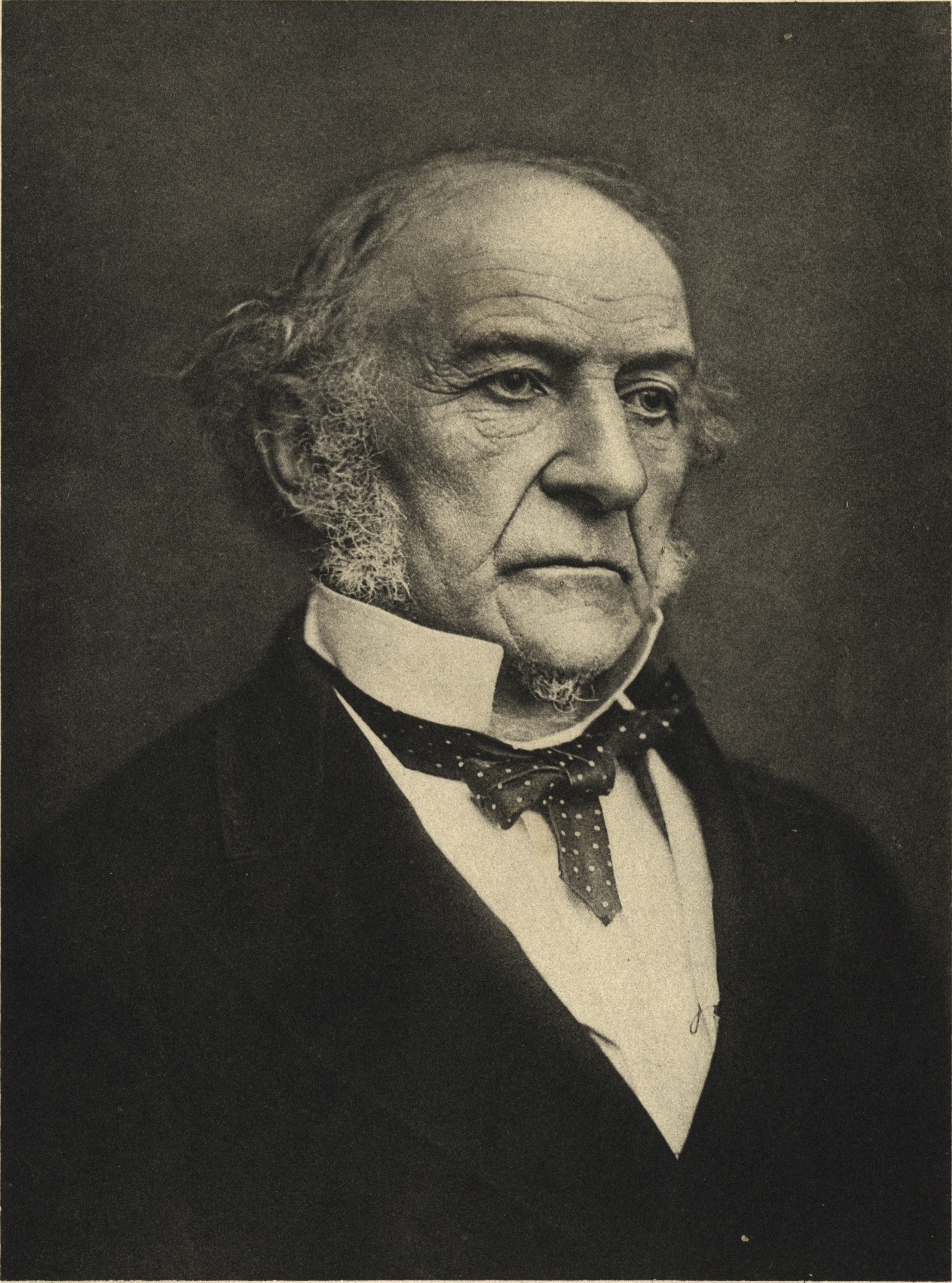
Prime Minister William Ewart Gladstone

William Ewart Gladstone was the Liberal counterpart to Disraeli, serving as prime minister four times (1868–1874, 1880–1885, 1886 and 1892–1894). His financial policies, based on the notion of balanced budgets, low taxes and laissez-faire, were suited to a developing capitalist society but could not respond effectively as economic and social conditions changed. Called the "Grand Old Man" later in life, he was always a dynamic popular orator who appealed strongly to British workers and the lower middle class. The deeply religious Gladstone brought a new moral tone to politics with his evangelical sensibility. His moralism often angered his upper-class opponents (including Queen Victoria, who strongly favoured Disraeli), and his heavy-handed control split the Liberal party. His foreign policy goal was to create a European order based on cooperation rather than conflict and mutual trust instead of rivalry and suspicion; the rule of law was to supplant the reign of force and self-interest. This Gladstonian concept of a harmonious Concert of Europe was opposed to and ultimately defeated by the Germans with a Bismarckian system of manipulated alliances and antagonisms.

==== Salisbury ====
Conservative Prime Minister Lord Salisbury was a "talented leader who was an icon of traditional, aristocratic conservatism". Salisbury was "a great foreign minister, [but] essentially negative, indeed reactionary in home affairs". Another historian's estimate is more favourable; he portrays Salisbury as a leader who "held back the popular tide for twenty years." "[I]nto the 'progressive' strain of modern Conservatism he simply will not fit." One historian pointed to "the narrow cynicism of Salisbury". One admirer of Salisbury agrees that Salisbury found the democracy born of the 1867 and 1884 Reform Acts as "perhaps less objectionable than he had expected—succeeding, through his public persona, in mitigating some part of its nastiness."

=== Morality ===
The Victorian era is famous for the Victorian standards of personal morality. Historians generally agree that the middle classes held high personal moral standards (and usually followed them), but have debated whether the working classes followed suit. Moralists in the late 19th century such as Henry Mayhew decried the slums for their supposed high levels of cohabitation without marriage and illegitimate births. However, new research using computerised matching of data files shows that the rates of cohabitation then were quite low—under 5%—for the working class and the poor.

== Early 20th century ==
Prime ministers from 1900 to 1923: Lord Salisbury, Arthur Balfour, Henry Campbell-Bannerman, H. H. Asquith, David Lloyd George, Bonar Law.

=== Edwardian era: 1901–1914 ===
Queen Victoria died in 1901 and her son Edward VII became king, inaugurating the Edwardian era, which was characterised by great and ostentatious displays of wealth in contrast to the sombre Victorian Era. With the advent of the 20th century, things such as motion pictures, automobiles, and aeroplanes were coming into use. The new century was characterised by a feeling of great optimism. The social reforms of the last century continued into the 20th with the Labour Party being formed in 1900. Edward died in 1910, to be succeeded by George V, who reigned 1910–1936. Scandal-free, hard working and popular, George V was the British monarch who, with Queen Mary, established the modern pattern of exemplary conduct for British royalty, based on middle-class values and virtues. He understood the overseas Empire better than any of his prime ministers and used his exceptional memory for figures and details, whether of uniforms, politics, or relations, to good effect in reaching out in conversation with his subjects.

The era was prosperous but political crises were escalating out of control. Multiple crises hit simultaneously in 1910–1914 with serious social and political instability arising from the Irish crisis, labour unrest, the women's suffrage movements, and partisan and constitutional struggles in Parliament. At one point it even seemed the Army might refuse orders dealing with Ireland. No solution appeared in sight when the unexpected outbreak of the Great War in 1914 put domestic issues on hold. The political party system of the Edwardian era was in delicate balance on the eve of the war in 1914. The Liberals were in power with a progressive alliance of Labour and, off and on, Irish nationalists. The coalition was committed to free trade (as opposed to the high tariffs the Conservatives sought), free collective bargaining for trades unions (which Conservatives opposed), an active social policy that was forging the welfare state, and constitutional reform to reduce the power of the House of Lords. The coalition lacked a long-term plan, because it was cobbled together from leftovers from the 1890s. The sociological basis was non-Anglicanism and non-English ethnicity rather than the emerging class conflict emphasised by the Labour Party.

=== Great War ===
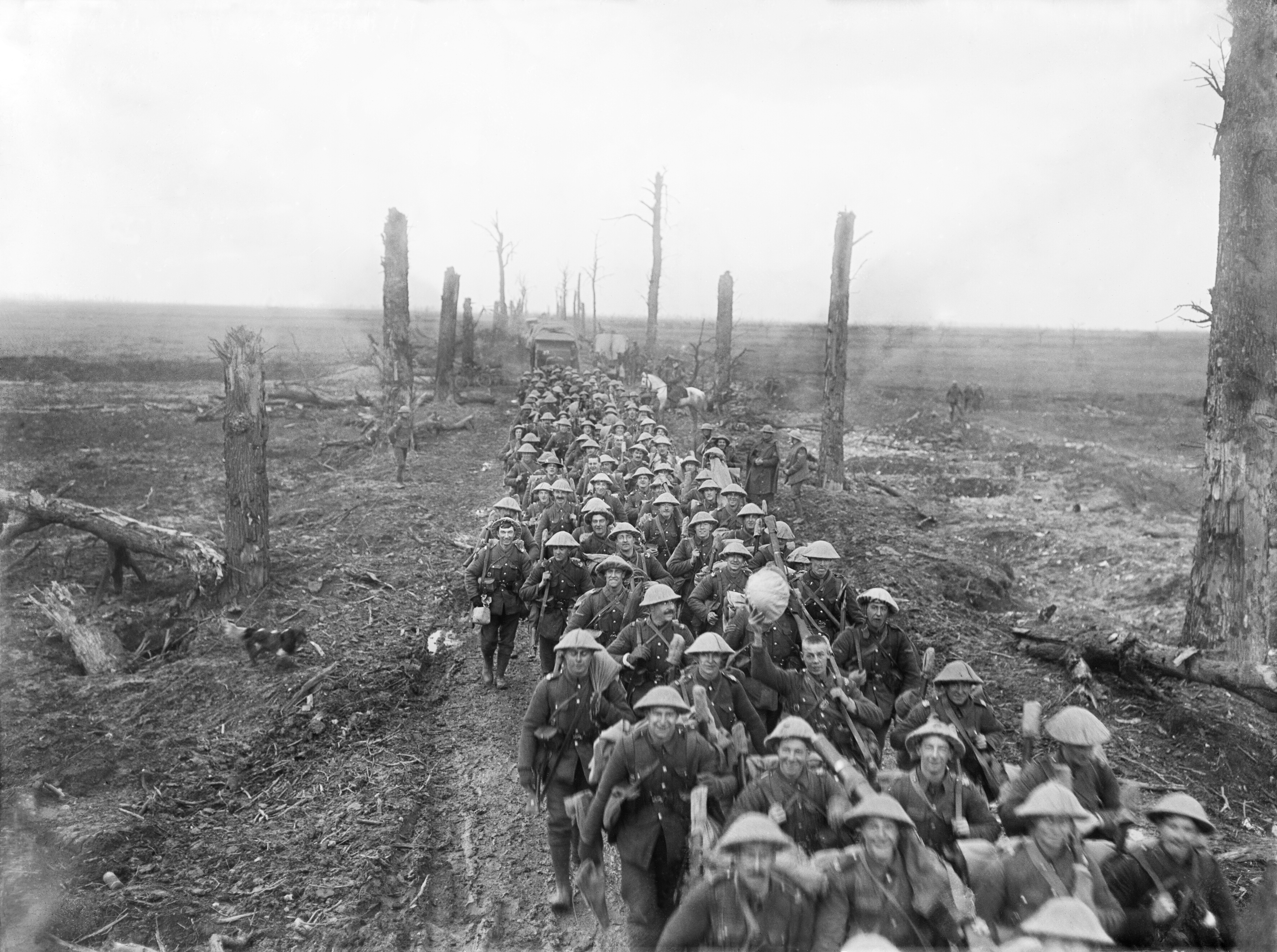
Men of the Nottinghamshire and Derbyshire Regiment following up the Germans near Brie, March 1917

After a rough start Britain under David Lloyd George successfully mobilised its manpower, industry, finances, empire and diplomacy, in league with the French and Americans, to defeat the Central Powers. The economy grew by about 14% from 1914 to 1918 despite the absence of so many men in the services; by contrast the German economy shrank 27%. The Great War saw a decline in civilian consumption, with a major reallocation to munitions. The government share of GDP soared from 8% in 1913 to 38% in 1918 (compared to 50% in 1943). The war forced Britain to use up its financial reserves and borrow large sums from the U.S.

Britain entered the war to protect Belgium from German aggression, and quickly assumed the role of fighting the Imperial German Army on the Western Front, and dismantling the overseas German Empire. The romantic notions of warfare that everyone had expected faded as the fighting in France bogged down into trench warfare. Along the Western Front the British and French launched repeated assaults on the German trench lines in 1915–1917, which killed and wounded hundreds of thousands, but made only limited gains. By early 1916, with number of volunteers falling off, the government imposed conscription in Britain (but was not able to do so in Ireland where nationalists of all stripes militantly opposed it) in order to keep up the strength of the army. Industry turned out munitions in large quantities, with many women taking factory jobs. The Asquith government proved ineffective but when David Lloyd George replaced him in December 1916 Britain gained a powerful and successful wartime leader.

The Navy continued to dominate the seas, fighting the Imperial German Navy to a draw in the only great battle, the Battle of Jutland in 1916. Germany was blockaded and was increasingly short of food. It tried to fight back with submarines, despite the risk of war by the powerful neutral power the United States. The waters around Britain were declared a war zone where any ship, neutral or otherwise, was a target. After the liner Lusitania was sunk in May 1915, drowning over 100 American passengers, protests by the United States led Germany to abandon unrestricted submarine warfare. In spring 1917 it resumed the sinking of all merchant ships without warning. The United States entered the war alongside the Allies in 1917, and provided the needed manpower, money and supplies to keep them going. On other fronts, the British, French, New Zealanders, Australians and Japanese occupied Germany's colonies. Britain fought the Ottoman Empire, suffering defeats in the Gallipoli Campaign and (initially) in Mesopotamia, while arousing the Arabs who helped expel the Turks from Mesopotamia and Palestine. Exhaustion and war-weariness were growing worse in 1917, as the fighting in France continued with no end in sight. With Russia collapsing in the 1917 Revolutions Germany now calculated it could finally have numerical superiority on the Western Front. The massive German spring offensives of 1918 failed, and with arrival of a million of the American Expeditionary Forces at the rate of 10,000 a day by May 1918, the Germans realised they were being overwhelmed. Germany gave up, agreeing to an Armistice on 11 November 1918. It was actually tantamount almost to a surrender with Germany handing over her fleet and heavy weapons, and her army retreating behind the river Rhine.

By 1918, there were about five million people in the army and the fledgling Royal Air Force, newly formed from the Royal Naval Air Service (RNAS) and the Royal Flying Corps (RFC), was about the same size of the pre-war army. The almost three million casualties were known as the "lost generation", and such numbers inevitably left society scarred; but even so, some people felt their sacrifice was little regarded in Britain, with poems like Siegfried Sassoon's Blighters criticising the war as a human failure. The literary legacy focused on mass death, mechanised slaughter, fallacious propaganda and deep disillusionment, thereby annihilating long-standing romanticised images of the glories of war.

=== Postwar ===
The war had been won by Britain and its allies, but at a terrible human and financial cost, creating a sentiment that wars should never be fought again. The League of Nations was founded with the idea that nations could resolve their differences peacefully, but these hopes were unfounded.

Following the war, Britain gained the German colony of Tanganyika and part of Togoland in Africa. Britain was granted League of Nations mandates over Palestine, which was turned into a homeland for Jewish settlers, and Iraq, created from the three Ottoman provinces in Mesopotamia; the latter of which became fully independent in 1932. The Kingdom of Egypt, which had been occupied by Britain since 1882, and a British protectorate since 1914, became independent in 1922 after the Egyptian Revolution of 1919, although British troops remained stationed there until the Suez Crisis of 1956.

In domestic affairs the Housing, Town Planning, &c. Act 1919 led to affordable council housing which allowed people to move out of decrepit inner-city slums. The slums remained for several more years, with trams being electrified long before many houses. The Representation of the People Act 1918 gave women householders the vote, but it would not be until 1928 that full equal suffrage was achieved. Labour displaced the Liberal Party for second place and achieved major success with the 1922 general election.

== Ireland ==
=== Campaign for Irish Home Rule ===
Part of the agreement which led to the Acts of Union 1800 stipulated that the Penal Laws in Ireland were to be repealed and Catholic emancipation granted. However, George III blocked emancipation, arguing that to grant it would break his coronation oath to defend the Anglican Church. A campaign by the lawyer Daniel O'Connell, and the death of George III, led to the concession of Catholic emancipation in 1829, allowing Roman Catholics to sit in the Parliament of the United Kingdom of Great Britain and Ireland. Catholic emancipation was not O'Connell's real goal, which was the repeal of the act of union with Great Britain. On 1 January 1843 O'Connell confidently, but wrongly, declared that repeal would be achieved that year. When potato blight hit the island in 1846, much of the rural population, especially in Catholic districts, began to starve.

While government funds were supplemented by private individuals and charities, and aid from the United States, it was not enough to avert a major catastrophe. The government of Lord John Russell attempted to raise a loan of £8 million and intended a further loan but this provoked a financial crisis made worse by demand for funds for railways and food imports. The crisis prevented the expending of the loan if the pound was to remain convertible to gold and government funding was slashed in 1847 and the costs of relief transferred to local taxes in Ireland. Cottiers (or farm labourers) were largely wiped out and emigration soared during the Great Irish Famine. A significant minority elected Unionists, who championed the Union. Isaac Butt, a Church of Ireland (Anglican) barrister built a new moderate nationalist movement, the Home Rule League, in the 1870s. After Butt's death the home rule movement, or the Irish Parliamentary Party as it had become known, was turned into a major political force under the guidance of William Shaw and a radical young Anglo-Irish Protestant landowner, Charles Stewart Parnell.

Parnell's movement campaigned for "Home Rule", by which they meant that Ireland would govern itself as a region within the United Kingdom. Two home rule Bills (1886 and 1893) were introduced by the Liberal Prime Minister William Ewart Gladstone, but neither became law, mainly due to opposition from the Conservative party and the House of Lords. The issue was a source of contention throughout Ireland, as a significant majority of Unionists (largely but not exclusively based in Ulster), opposed home rule, fearing that a Catholic Nationalist ("Rome Rule") parliament in Dublin would discriminate or retaliate against them, impose Roman Catholic doctrine, and impose tariffs on industry. While most of Ireland was primarily agricultural, six of the counties in Ulster were the location of heavy industry and would be affected by any tariff barriers imposed.

Irish demands ranged from the "repeal" of O'Connell, the "federal scheme" of William Sharman Crawford (actually devolution, not federalism as such), to the Home Rule League of Isaac Butt. Ireland was no closer to home rule by the mid-19th century, and rebellions in 1848 and 1867 failed.

O'Connell's campaign was hampered by the limited scope of the franchise in Ireland. The wider the franchise was expanded, the better anti-union parties were able to do in Ireland. Running on a platform that advocated something like the self-rule successfully enacted in Canada under the British North America Act, 1867, home rulers won a majority of both county and borough seats in Ireland in 1874. By 1882, leadership of the home rule movement had passed to Charles Stewart Parnell of the Irish Parliamentary Party. A wider franchise also changed the ideological mix among non-Irish MPs, making them more receptive to Irish demands. The 1885 election resulted in a hung parliament in which the Irish Parliamentary Party held the balance of power. They initially supported the Conservatives in a minority government, but when news leaked that Liberal Party leader Gladstone was considering home rule, the IPP ousted the Conservatives and brought the Liberals into office.

Gladstone's First Home Rule Bill was closely modelled on the self-government given Canada in 1867. Irish MPs would no longer vote in Westminster but would have their own separate Dublin parliament, which would control domestic issues. Foreign policy and military affairs would remain with London. Gladstone's proposals did not go as far as most Irish nationalists desired, but were still too radical for both Irish unionists and British unionists: his first home rule bill was defeated in the House of Commons following a split in his own party. Liberal leader Joseph Chamberlain led the battle against home rule in Parliament. He broke with Gladstone and in 1886 formed a new party, the Liberal Unionist Party. It helped defeat home rule and eventually merged with the Conservative party. Chamberlain used anti-Catholicism to build a base for the new party among "Orange" nonconformist Protestant elements in Britain and Ireland. Liberal Unionist John Bright coined the party's catchy slogan, "Home rule means Rome rule."

Gladstone took the issue to the people in the 1886 election, but the Unionists (Conservatives plus the Liberal Unionists) won a majority. In 1890 a divorce case showed Parnell was an adulterer; he was forced from power, and died in 1891. Gladstone introduced a Second Home Rule Bill in 1893, which this time was passed by the Commons, but was defeated in the Conservative-dominated House of Lords. The Conservatives came to power until 1906 and home rule became a dead issue, but the subsidised sale of farm land greatly reduced the Protestant presence in Ireland south of Ulster. Having been rejected by the Conservatives, the Irish nationalist forces had little choice but to support the minority Liberal Party. New groups split off and they finally all merged in 1900 into the Irish Parliamentary Party led by John Redmond.

The Conservative government also felt that the demands in Ireland could be satisfied by helping the Catholics purchase their farms from Protestant owners. A solution by money not force was called "killing home rule with kindness". Reforms passed as a result included the Local Government (Ireland) Act 1898 and the Land Purchase (Ireland) Act 1903. Between 1868 and 1908: spending on Ireland was generally increased, huge tracts of land were purchased from landlords and redistributed to smallholders, local government was democratised, and the franchise widely extended. Ireland remained calm until the eve of the First World War, when the Liberal government passed the Government of Ireland Act 1914 and Protestants in Ulster mobilised to oppose it by force.

Ulster Protestants began to arm themselves and form militias ready to fight; senior leaders of the British army indicated they would not move to suppress the Protestants (the Curragh incident). Suddenly war with Germany broke out and home rule was suspended for the duration. There was no conscription in Ireland; military service was optional. Large numbers of both Protestant and Catholic young men volunteered to fight Germany.

=== Irish independence ===
The Irish Free State (red) in 1922

The Easter Rising of 1916, using arms supplied by the German Empire was badly organised. The British army suppressed it after a week of fighting but the quick executions of 15 leaders alienated nationalist opinion. Overnight there was a movement away from home rule and toward Irish independence. The Cabinet decided that the 1914 Act should be brought into operation immediately and a Government established in Dublin. Negotiations were stalemated as Ulster mobilised. London made a second attempt to implement Home Rule in 1917, with the calling of the Irish Convention. Prime Minister Lloyd George sought a dual policy in April 1918 that attempted to link implementing Home Rule with extending conscription to Ireland. Irish nationalists rejected conscription and a wave of anti-conscription demonstrations signalled growing support for the demand for total independence. The old Irish Party collapsed and a new political force, Sinn Féin which called for force to achieve its goals, united Irish nationalists.

Sinn Féin won the 1918 general elections in Ireland and in keeping with their policy of abstention did not send its elected MPs to Westminster, deciding to set up its own separatist parliament in Dublin; Dáil Éireann, which declared independence. The British government attempted to suppress the Dáil and the Irish War of Independence followed, with the Irish Republican Army fighting the British Army. London's attempted solution in the Fourth Home Rule Bill was the establishment of separate parliaments for Southern Ireland and Northern Ireland (six counties in Ulster), enacted as the Government of Ireland Act 1920.

In mid-1921 a truce was agreed between the British government and Sinn Féin. This was followed by negotiations which resulted in the Anglo-Irish Treaty. On 6 December 1922, Southern Ireland formed a new dominion named the Irish Free State. Northern Ireland immediately exercised its right under the Anglo-Irish Treaty to opt out of the new state. This treaty created a division in Irish nationalism and resulted in the Irish Civil War between the National Army and the Anti-Treaty faction of the Irish Republican Army.

The union of Great Britain with six counties of Ulster was renamed the United Kingdom of Great Britain and Northern Ireland in 1927, and is known by this name to the present time.

== List of monarchs ==
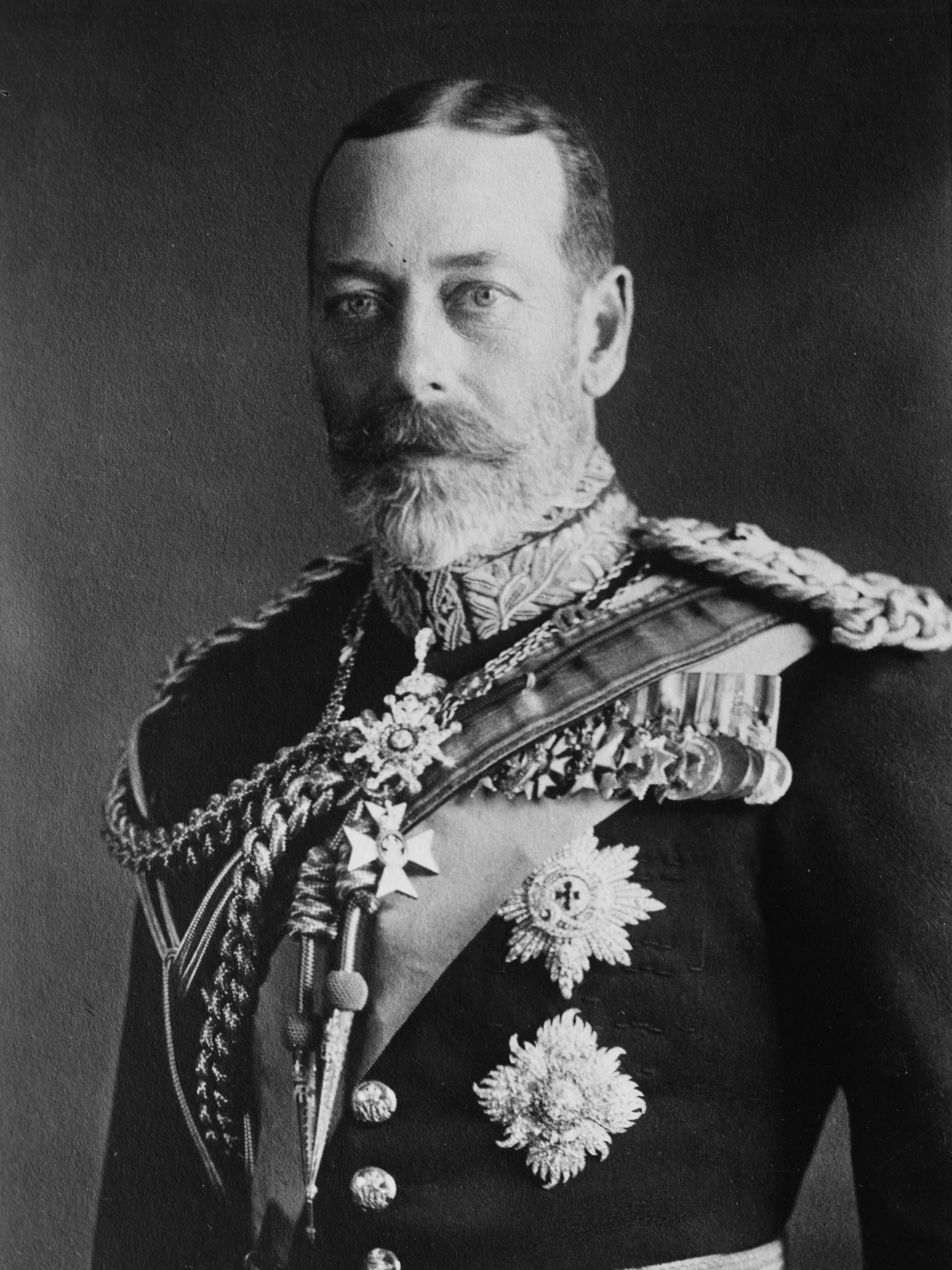
George V, the last British king to be styled as King of the United Kingdom of Great Britain and Ireland

Until 1927, the monarch's royal title included the words "of the United Kingdom of Great Britain and Ireland". In 1927, the words "United Kingdom" were removed from the royal title so that the monarch was instead styled as "King/Queen of Great Britain, Ireland...[and other places]". The words "United Kingdom" were restored to the monarch's title in 1953 with the reference to "Ireland" replaced with a reference to "Northern Ireland".

- George III (1801–1820; monarch from 1760)
- George IV (1820–1830)
- William IV (1830–1837)
- Victoria (1837–1901)
- Edward VII (1901–1910)
- George V (1910–1922; title used until 1927 but remained monarch until his death in 1936)

== See also ==
- Historiography of the British Empire
- Historiography of the United Kingdom
- History of Ireland (1801–1923)
- History of the United Kingdom
- Terminology of the British Isles
- Victorian era, covers social & cultural history

== Works cited ==
- Beckett, Ian F. W. (2006). The Home Front, 1914–1918: How Britain Survived the Great War. Bloomsbury Academic. ISBN 978-1-9033-6581-6.
- Black, Eugene C., ed. (1969). British politics in the nineteenth century. Walker. ISBN 978-0-8027-2002-3.
- Black, Jeremy (2006). A Military History of Britain: From 1775 to the Present. Bloomsbury Academic. ISBN 978-0-2759-9039-8.
- Black, Jeremy (2009). The War of 1812 in the Age of Napoleon. University of Oklahoma Press. ISBN 978-0-8061-4078-0.
- Boyce, David George (1995) [1st pub. 1982]. Nationalism in Ireland (3rd ed.). New York: Routledge. ISBN 978-0-4151-2776-9.
- Briggs, Asa (1959). The Age of Improvement, 1783–1867. Longman. ISBN 978-0-5823-6960-3.
- Cannon, John, ed. (2002). The Oxford Companion to British History (2nd revised ed.). Oxford University Press. ISBN 978-0-1986-0872-1.
- Evans, Eric J. (1996) [1983]. The Forging of the Modern State: Early Industrial Britain, 1783–1870 (2nd ed.). Longman. ISBN 978-0-5820-8953-2.
- Evans, Eric J. (2008). Britain Before the Reform Act: Politics and Society 1815–1832 (2nd ed.). Routledge. ISBN 978-1-1348-1603-3.
- Figes, Orlando (2012). The Crimean War: A History. Picador. ISBN 978-1-2500-0252-5.
- Hilton, Boyd (2006). A Mad, Bad, and Dangerous People?: England 1783–1846. Clarendon Press. pp. 664–723. ISBN 978-0-1982-2830-1.
- Hoppen, K. Theodore (2000). The Mid-Victorian Generation 1846–1886. New Oxford History of England. ISBN 978-0-1982-2834-9.
- Jackson, Alvin (2003). Home Rule: An Irish History 1800—2000. Oxford University Press. ISBN 978-0-1952-2048-3.
- Judd, Denis; Surridge, Keith Terrance (2003). Boer War. Palgrave Macmillan. ISBN 978-1-4039-6150-1.
- Kendle, John (1992). Walter Long, Ireland and the Union, 1905–1920. McGill-Queen's Press - MQUP. ISBN 978-0-7735-0908-5.
- Knight, Roger (2015). Britain Against Napoleon: The Organization Of Victory; 1793–1815. Penguin UK. ISBN 978-0-1419-7702-7.
- Marwick, Arthur (1965). The Deluge: British Society and the First World War. Bodley Head. ISBN 978-7-0700-0496-1.
- Martin, Howard (1996). Britain in the 19th Century. Challenging History. Nelson Thornes. ISBN 978-0-1743-5062-0.
- Medlicott, William Norton (1967). Contemporary England 1914–1964.
- Mowat, Charles Loch (1955). Britain between the wars: 1918–1940. Methuen. ISBN 978-0-4162-9510-8.
- Porter, Andrew, ed. (1998). The Nineteenth Century, The Oxford History of the British Empire. Vol. III. Oxford University Press. ISBN 978-0-1992-4678-6.
- Roberts, Clayton; Roberts, David F.; Bisson, Douglas (2013). A History of England, Volume 2: 1688 to the Present. Routledge. ISBN 978-1-3155-0960-0.
- Taylor, A. J. P. (1953). The Struggle for Mastery in Europe: 1848–1918. Clarendon Press. ISBN 978-0-1988-1270-8., diplomacy
- Tombs, Robert (2014). "The English and their History". The Observer. Archived from the original on 29 August 2022.
- Webb, R. K. (1968). Modern England: from the eighteenth century to the present. Dodd, Mead. ISBN 978-0-0604-6975-7.
- Woodward, Ernest Llewellyn (1962) [1938]. The Age of Reform, 1815–1870 (2nd ed.).

Preceded by Kingdom of Great Britain; Kingdom of Ireland	United Kingdom of Great Britain and Ireland; 1801–1922	Succeeded by United Kingdom of Great Britain and Northern Ireland; Irish Free State
