= Harold Perkin =

English social historian (1926–2004)

- Born: Harold James Perkin; 11 November 1926; Hanley, Staffordshire, England
- Died: 16 October 2004 (aged 77)

Academic background
- Education: Jesus College, Cambridge

Academic work
- Discipline: Historian
- Institutions: University of Manchester; University of Lancaster; Northwestern University; Rice University

Harold James Perkin (11 November 1926 – 16 October 2004) was a distinguished English social historian who was the founder of the Social History Society in 1976.

== Background ==
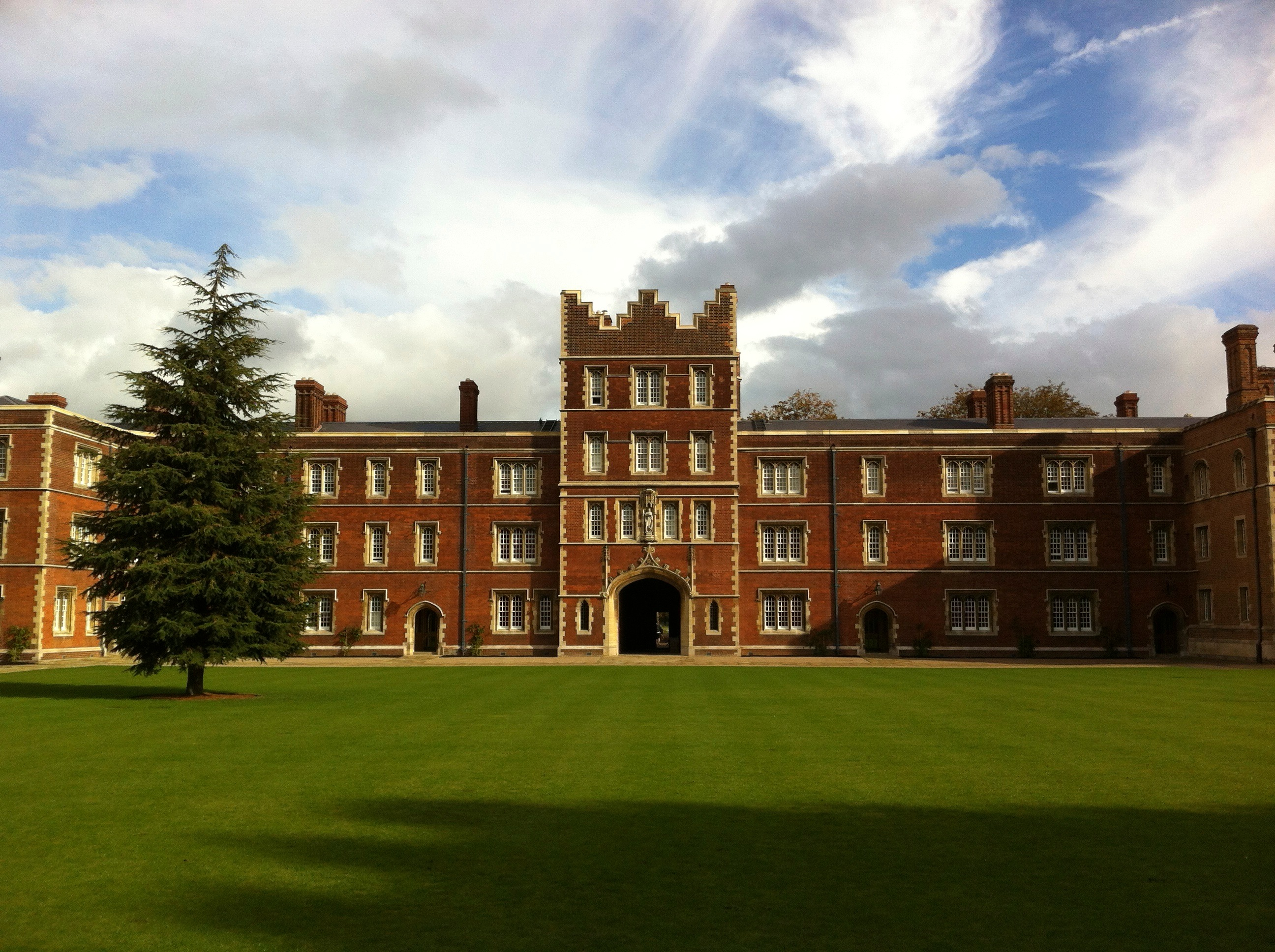
Chapel Court, Jesus College, Cambridge

Harold Perkin was born in Hanley, Staffordshire, on 11 November 1926 as the eldest child of five in the working class family of Robert James Perkin, a builder, and his wife Hilda May Dillon. He attended Hanley High School and won a scholarship to Jesus College, Cambridge, from 1945, gaining a starred First Class degree in 1948. At Cambridge, he was involved in amateur dramatics, and was a member of the cast of La Vie Cambridgienne, the first Cambridge Footlights revue to be televised by the BBC.

After National Service in the RAF, he was rejected by his Cambridge college to study for a PhD on the basis that his abilities, "though considerable", did not lie in the direction of academic research. The historian Susan Pedersen wrote that Oxbridge did not welcome him because he was "too obviously working class." He began extramural history teaching from 1950 with the University of Manchester.

== Academic career ==
Alexandra Square, Lancaster University

Perkin was a lecturer in social history at the University of Manchester (1951–1965), then a Senior Lecturer (1965–1967), a Professor (1967–1984) in social history and Director of the centre for social history (1974–84) at the University of Lancaster, and an Emeritus Professor of History at Northwestern University, Illinois (1985–1997). In addition, he held a visiting professorship at Rice University and founded the Social History Society serving as Chairman (1976–1991). Perkin served as chief salary negotiator for the Association of University Teachers, of which he was later President. He was a distinguished, pioneering social historian, whose interests included transport.

== Publications ==
- Perkin, H.J. (1969), New Universities in the United Kingdom, Case Studies on Innovation in Higher Education, Paris: OECD
- Perkin, H.J. (1969), Key Profession: History of the Association of University Teachers, London: Routledge & Kegan Paul, ISBN 0-7100-6501-9
- Perkin, H.J. (1969), The Origins of Modern English Society 1780–1880, London: Routledge & Kegan Paul, ISBN 0-7100-4567-0
- Perkin, H.J. (1970), The Age of the Railway, Panther Books, ISBN 978-0877493518
- Perkin, H.J. (1970), History (Outline), Law Book Co of Australasia, ISBN 0-7100-6814-X
- Perkin, H.J. (1976), Age of the Automobile, Quartet Books, ISBN 0-7043-2112-2
- Perkin, H.J. (1981), The Structured Crowd: Essays in English Social History, Harvester Books, ISBN 0-85527-413-1
- Perkin, H.J. (1989), The Rise of Professional Society, England Since 1880, London: Routledge, ISBN 0-415-30178-5
- Perkin, H.J. (1996), The Third Revolution: Professional Elites in the Modern World, London: Routledge, ISBN 0-415-14337-3
- Perkin, H.J. (2002), The Making of a Social Historian (autobiography), Athena Press, ISBN 978-1844010141

== Television ==
Perkin presented television shows for Granada TV:

- The Age of the Railway, 1970
- The Age of the Automobile, 1976

The scripts for both of these were also later published.

Professional and academic associations
Preceded by Creation	Chair of the Social History Society; 1976–1991	Succeeded by Eric J. Evans
