= Eric J. Evans =

British historian

Eric J. Evans FRSA FRHistS FHA

Dean of Arts and Social Sciences University of Lancaster
- In office 2004–2005

Academic background
- Education: University of Oxford (BA); University of Warwick (PhD)
- Thesis: A History of the Tithe System in England, 1690-1850 with special reference to Staffordshire (1970)

Academic work
- Institutions: University of Stirling; University of Lancaster
- Main interests: History
- Website: Eric Evans

Eric J. Evans FRSA FRHistS (2 July 1945 – 27 March 2022) was a British historian who was Professor Emeritus of History at the University of Lancaster and was Chair (1991–98) and vice-president (since 1998) of the Social History Society.

== Education ==
Sheldonian Theatre, Oxford

Evans's first degree (BA) was from the University of Oxford (1966) and his PhD was from the University of Warwick (1970). His specialist research interests included: British political history since the eighteenth century; the history of social policy; how social change affects the political process; British national identities.

== Career ==
Alexandra Square, Lancaster University

Evans's academic career began as a Lecturer at the University of Stirling (1969–71). He had been at Lancaster University since 1971, being successively Lecturer, Senior Lecturer and Reader. He became Professor of Social History in 1985 and served as Dean of the university's Faculty of Arts and Social Science (2004–5). He was an office-holder of the Social History Society from its inception in 1976 to 1998, serving as the Society's Chairman (1991–98) and Honorary Vice-president (from 1998).

More recent publications included The Shaping of Modern Britain, 1780–1914 (Pearson Longman, 2011), Sir Robert Peel, Statesmanship Power and Party (2nd ed., 2006) and The Forging of the Modern State: Early Industrial Britain 1783–1870 (3rd ed., Longman, 2001). He was also interested in curriculum development and assessment. He was Chief Examiner and Chair of Examiners in History for each of the three major English GCSE and A-level Awarding Bodies. He was Chair of the History Postgraduate Awards Panel of the Arts and Humanities Research Board from 2000 to 2005.

He was elected a Centenary Fellow of the UK Historical Association in 2006. He was also a Fellow of the Royal Historical Society and the Royal Society of Arts. He was awarded a National Teaching Fellowship by the Higher Education Academy in 2004. His hobbies included music and cricket.

== Publications ==
- Evans, E.J. (1976), The Contentious Tithe: The Tithe Problem and English Agriculture 1750–1850, Studies in Economic History (1st; 2nd, 2017 ed.), London: Routledge, ISBN 9780710083241
- Evans, E.J. (1976), Tithes and the Tithe Commutation Act, 1836, London: Bedford Square Press, ISBN 9780719909351
- Evans, E.J. (1978), Social Policy, 1830–1914: Individualism, Collectivism, and the Origins of the Welfare State, London: Routledge, ISBN 978-1138698055
- Evans, E.J.; Richards, Jeffrey (1980), A Social History of Britain in Postcards, 1870–1930, London: Longman, ISBN 978-0582502925
- Evans, Eric J. (1983), The Great Reform Act of 1832, Lancaster Pamphlets (1st; 2nd, 1994 ed.), London: Routledge, ISBN 978-0-203-13189-3
- Evans, Eric J. (1983), The Forging of the Modern State: Early Industrial Britain, 1783–1870, Foundations of Modern Britain (1st; 2nd, 1996; 3rd, 2001 ed.), London: Pearson Longman, ISBN 978-0-582-47267-9
- Evans, Eric J. (1985), Political Parties in Britain, 1783–1867, Lancaster Pamphlets (1st ed.), London: Routledge, ISBN 9780416374001
- Evans, Eric J. (1989), Britain before the Reform Act: Politics and Society, 1815–32, Seminar Studies in History (2nd, 2008 ed.), London: Longman, ISBN 978-0-582-29908-5
- Evans, Eric J. (1991), Sir Robert Peel: Statesmanship, Power and Party, Lancaster Pamphlets (1st; 2nd, 2006 ed.), London: Routledge, ISBN 978-0-415-36616-8
- Evans, Eric J. (1997), Thatcher and Thatcherism, Lancaster Pamphlets (3rd, 2013 ed.), London: Routledge, ISBN 978-0-415-66019-8
- Evans, Eric J. (1999), Parliamentary Reform, c.1770–1918 (1st ed.), London: Longman, ISBN 978-0-582-29467-7
- Evans, Eric J. (1999), William Pitt the Younger, Lancaster Pamphlets (1st ed.), London: Routledge, ISBN 978-0-415-13285-5
- Evans, Eric J.; Schlicke, P., eds. (1999), Oxford Reader's Companion to Dickens, Oxford: Oxford University Press, ISBN 978-019-8662-53-2
- Evans, Eric J. (1999), "Achartism revisited", History Review, 33: 28–33
- Boyle, D.; Evans, Eric J., eds. (1999), Illustrated Guide to British History, Vancouver: Parragon, ISBN 978-075-2533-26-1
- Evans, Eric J. (2000), Chartism, London: Longman
- Evans, Eric J. (2000), ""The strict line of political succession?" Gladstone's relationship with Peel: An apt pupil?", in Bebbington, D.; Swift, R. (eds.), Gladstone Centenary Essays, Liverpool: Liverpool University Press, pp. 29–56, ISBN 978-0853-239-35-2
- Evans, Eric J.; Jenkins, J., eds. (2002), Victorian Social Life: British Social History, 1815–1914, London: John Murray, ISBN 978-0719-577-25-3
- Evans, Eric J. (2011), The Shaping of Modern Britain: Identity, Industry and Empire, 1780–1914 (1st ed.), London: Pearson Longman, ISBN 978-1-4082-2564-6

Academic offices
Preceded by	Dean of Arts and Social Sciences of the University of Lancaster; 2004–2005	Succeeded by
Professional and academic associations
Preceded by Harold Perkin	Chair of the Social History Society; 1991–1998	Succeeded by
