= Cultural and Social History =

- Discipline: Culture and history
- Language: English
- Edited by: Barry Doyle, David Nash and Vandana Joshi

Publication details
- History: 2004–present
- Publisher: Routledge on behalf of the Social History Society (United Kingdom)
- Frequency: 5/year

Standard abbreviations
- ISO 4: Cult. Soc. Hist.

Indexing
- ISSN: 1478-0038 (print); 1478-0046 (web)
- OCLC no.: 644711139

Links
- Journal homepage; Online access; Online archive

Cultural and Social History is a peer-reviewed academic journal covering cultural and social history published by Routledge five times a year on behalf of the Social History Society. It was established in 2004.

== Abstracting and indexing ==
The journal is abstracted and indexed in:

- America: History of Life
- Australian Research Council 2010 rankings – Grade A
- British Humanities Index, Historical Abstracts
- IBR International Bibliography of Book Reviews of Scholarly Literature in the Humanities and Social Sciences
- IBZ International Bibliography of Periodical Literature on the Humanities and Social Sciences
- ISI Arts and Humanities Citation Index
- Linguistics and Language Behavior Abstracts
- PAIS Public Affairs
- Information Service International
- Scopus
- Social Science Abstracts
