= Irish Land and Labour Association =

The Irish Land and Labour Association (ILLA) was a progressive movement founded in the early 1890s in Munster, Ireland, to organise and pursue political agitation for small tenant farmers' and rural labourers' rights. Its branches also spread into Connacht. The ILLA was known under different names—Land and Labour Association (LLA) or League (LLL). Its branches were active for almost thirty years, and had considerable success in propagating labour ideals before their traditions became the basis for the new labour and trade unions movements, with which they gradually amalgamated.

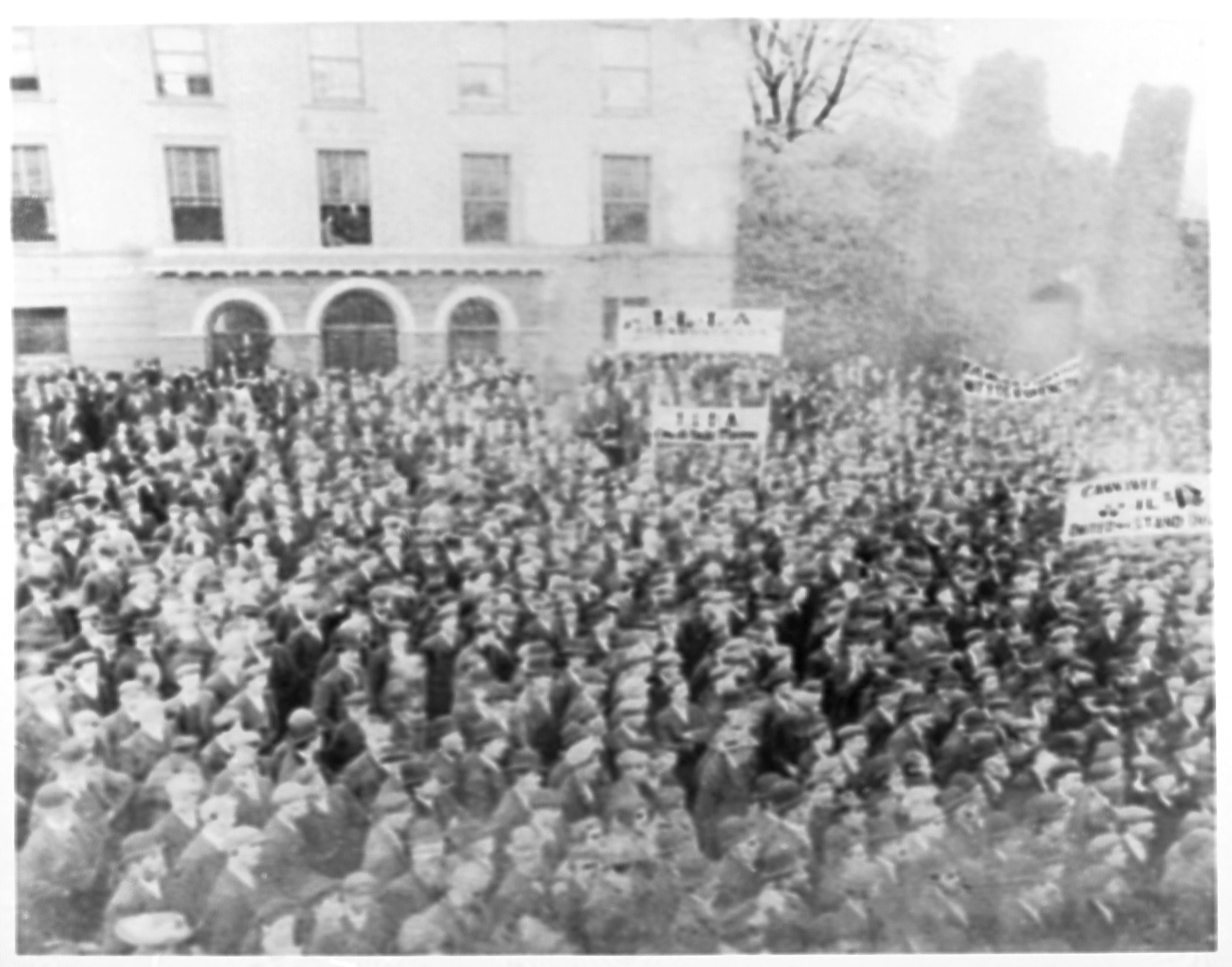
Mass rally of tenant farmers and labourers demonstrating under ILLA banners, Market Square, Macroom, County Cork, around 1894

== Background ==
Following the early formation of the Tenant Right League in 1850, which first demanded the adoption and enforcement of the Three Fs to aid Irish tenant farmers, namely

- fair rent;
- fixity of tenure;
- free sale;

all of whom lacked these rights, the first ineffective Irish Land Acts of 1870, 1880 and 1881 followed. By giving priority to farming interests, the Acts severely restricted labourers' cottage building, generally in the hands of landowners. The additional half-heartedness shown towards labourers' housing by the Acts was symptomatic of the fact that rural labourers had been little involved in the Irish Land League's Land War waged on behalf of small tenant farmers by Michael Davitt and William O'Brien from 1879 to 1882 in the poorer regions of Connacht and Munster, where conditions were especially severe. Together with Charles Stewart Parnell and his party lieutenants, they went into a bitter verbal offensive and were imprisoned in October 1881 under the Irish Coercion Act in Kilmainham Jail for "sabotaging the Land Act", from where the No Rent Manifesto was issued calling for a national tenant farmer rent strike which was partially followed. Although the League discouraged violence, agrarian crimes increased widely.

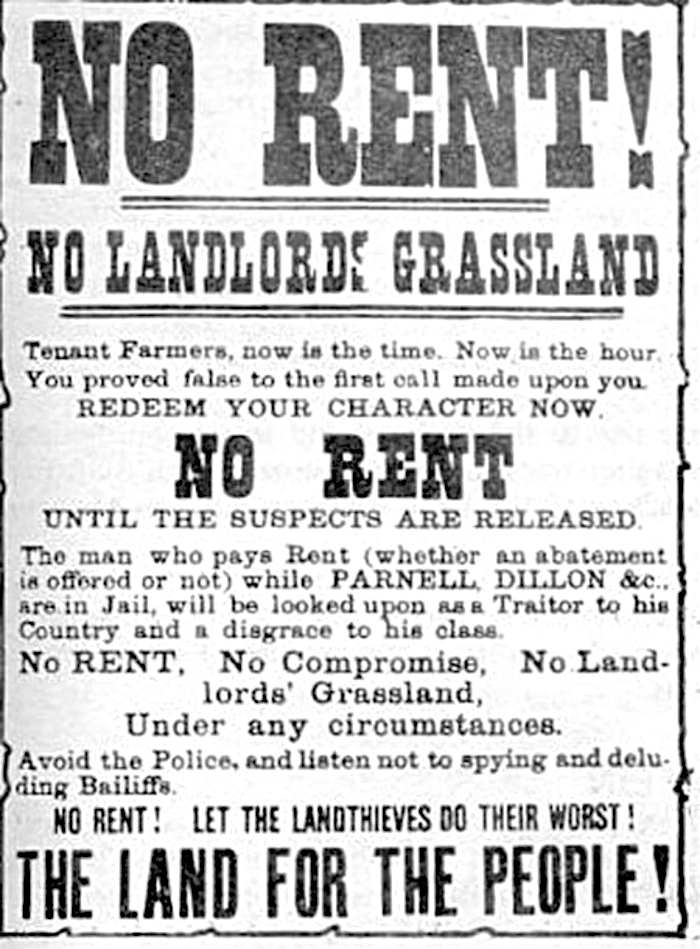
Land War manifesto

In 1881, nearly 75% of Irish people lived in rural areas. About 38% of these comprised the agricultural workforce, of which nearly 70% were agricultural labourers, 25% of these forming a class of 'landless' labourers, an estimated 60,000 in number, together with their families amounting to nearly a quarter of a million of the rural population, struggling to survive in the squalor of 40,000 one room 'cabins' (together with their animals if they could afford them). Their simple twin demand was for a decent home and a small piece of land. The Land League was thus forced to also address labourer's issues.

The first phase of Irish Tenant and Labourers (Land Purchase) Acts from 1883 to 1906 began with the 1883 Land Purchase (Ireland) Act, which was cumbersome, as was the Purchase of Land (Ireland) Act 1885 or Ashbourne Act. Both had to be amended in 1886 but nevertheless were a tentative start to land purchase under which initially 25,867 tenants were turned into owners of their farms. The Acts empowered to initiate schemes for building labourers' cottages with half acre allotments, the expenses of these to be met from local rates. They were therefore unpopular and few were built, as both the empowered Guardians and local farmers were themselves the ratepayers. The Acts were further overshadowed by two events: first, due to falling prices for agricultural produce and bad weather tenants could not pay their rent and united in the Plan of Campaign to withhold excessive rents. At the same time, Charles Stewart Parnell and the Irish Parliamentary Party (IPP) held the balance of power in the House of Commons. Their key concern in 1886 turned to Gladstone's First Irish Home Rule Bill, which was subsequently defeated.

Although Parnell had become converted to the labourers' cause whilst in Kilmainham Gaol, after he became leader of the IPP their cause fell victim to his distancing himself from the Plan of Campaign in the interest of pursuing Home Rule. Then further by his fall from power in 1891 and the ensuing Party split, aggravated by the rejection of the Second Irish Home Rule Bill by the House of Lords in 1893. Not least, from the middle of the 1890s less than 1,000 cottages a year were being built for small tenant farmers or privileged labourers.

== Origins ==
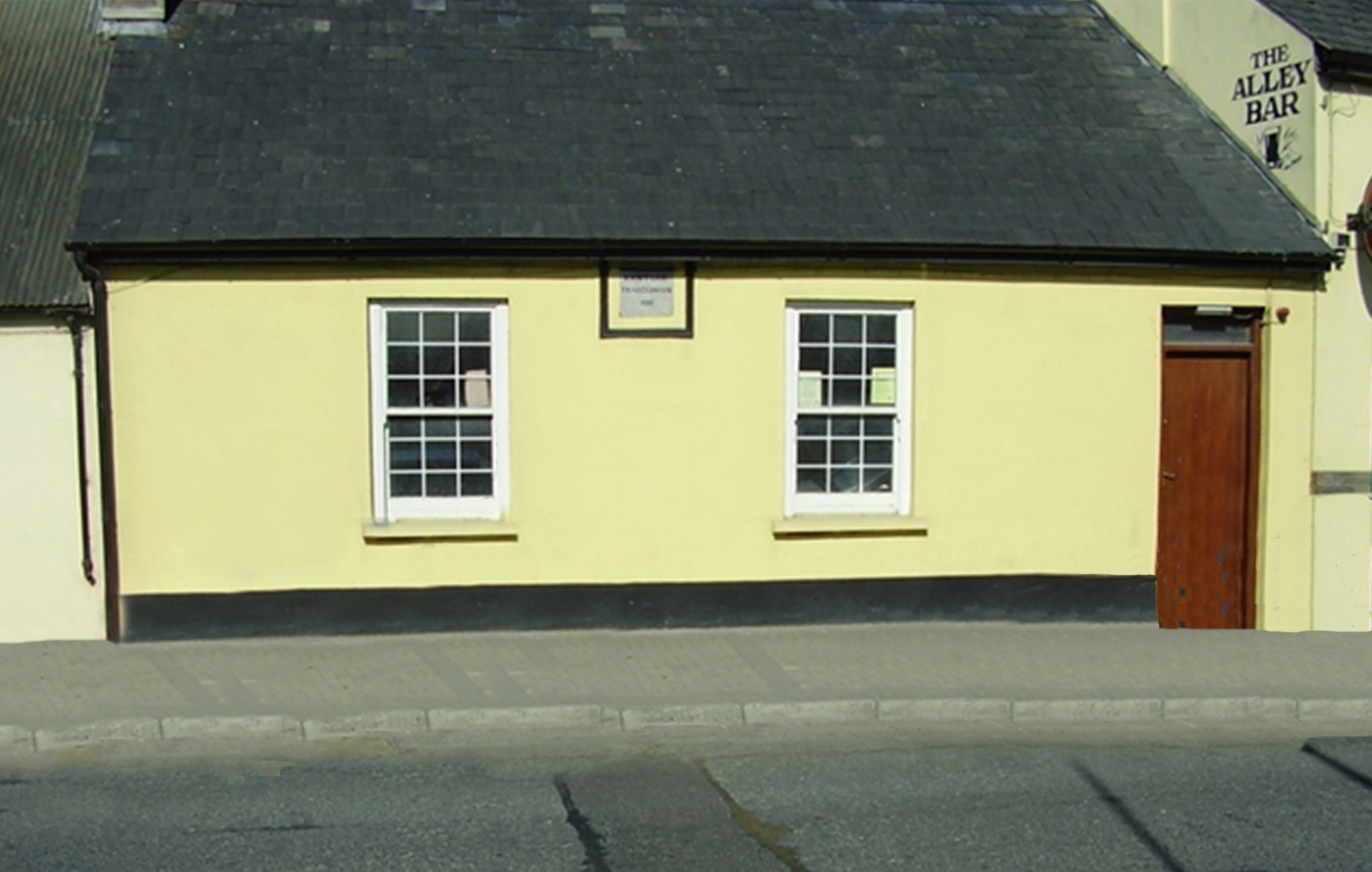
Image of one of Ireland's oldest and still active Trades Union halls in Kanturk erected 1881.

Acting in response to specific local needs, be it housing, land or employment, steadfast local spirits sustained Trade and Labour Leagues in parts of Counties Wicklow, Kilkenny, Laois, Kildare, Roscommon, Tyrone and Tipperary. However, it was not until the formation of the Knights of the Plough, a farm labourers' body founded by Benjamin Pellin, a small land-owner in the William Thompson tradition, at Narraghmore, County Kildare in June 1892, and of the National Labour League in Kanturk in January 1893, that the required organisation of the labourers began to take shape.

The rural area of North Cork around Kanturk and Duhallow had been since the 1860s a centre of labourer agitation and strikes, forming a number of early trade unions. In 1869 P. F. Johnson founded the Kanturk Labourers' Club (the first organised body to represent agricultural labourers) as well as the Irish Agricultural Labourers' Union (IALU) 1873 also in Kanturk, but these faded by 1875 due to lack of support from the nationalist home rule directory.

The most successful organisation was later the Kanturk Trade and Labour Association established in 1889 with the assistance amongst others, of a young man as its secretary, D. D. Sheehan who had experienced eviction with his family at the height of the Land League's Land War in 1880, when his father followed William O'Brien's "Pay No Rent" manifesto, their farm taken over by a "land-grabber" who paid their rent arrears. The Kanturk Association spread to other districts under a new title, the Duhallow Trade and Labour Association, in which Michael Davitt also became involved, until it broke up under the Irish Party's "Parnell split" in 1891.

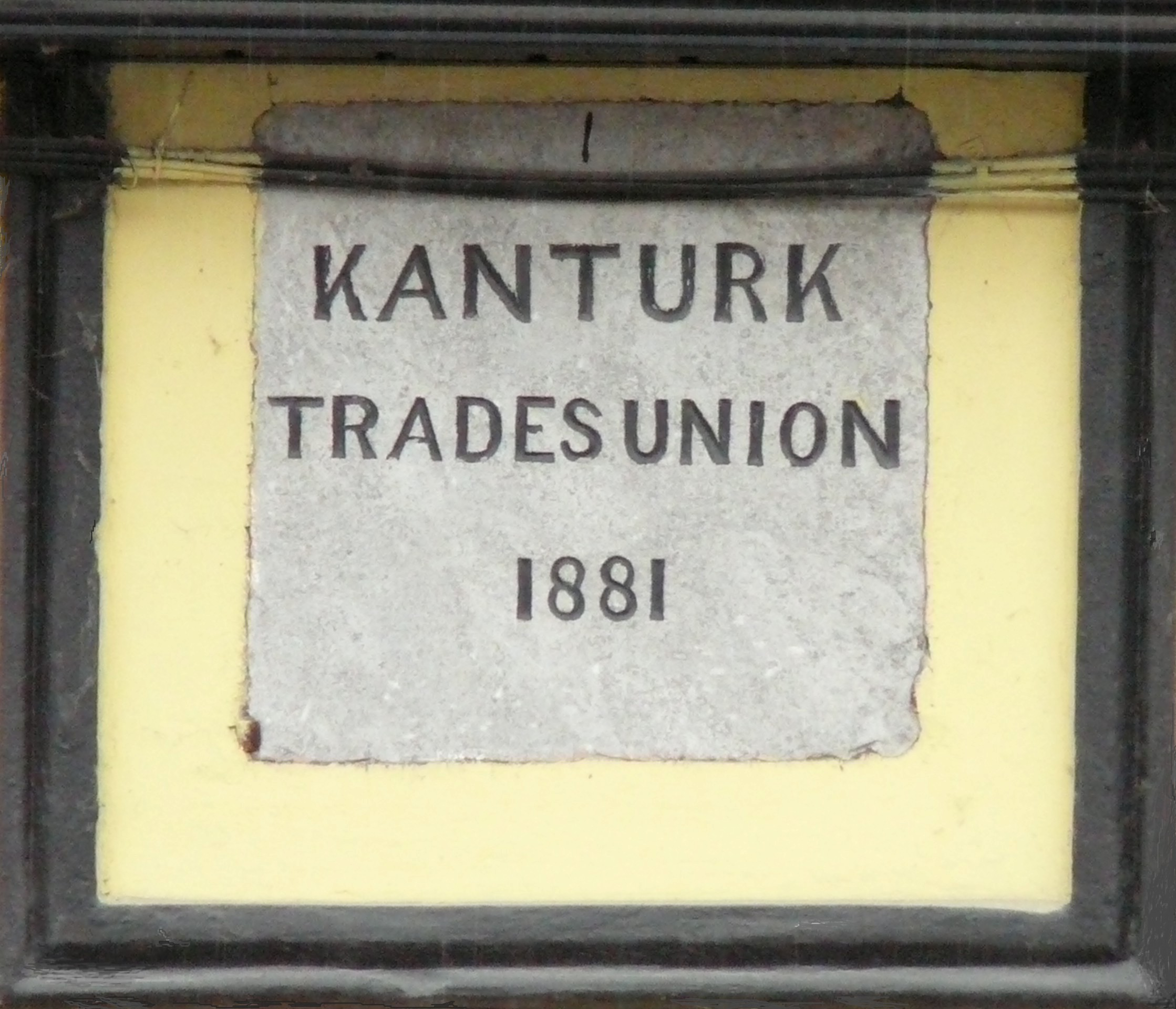
Plaque on wall of Kanturk Union Hall

It was realised on all sides, that the 1884 enfranchisement of the labourers had been insufficient in itself to wrest solutions to grievances from the state and the rural upper- and middle-classes. The control exercised over the implementation of the labourers' acts by conservative elements in rural society had had a ruinous affect. This finally brought the labourers' bodies together to gain political muscle. It became the raison d'être for calling a labour convention at Limerick Junction, County Tipperary on 15 August 1894, at which the Irish Land and Labour Association was created and officially launched, its founders D. D. Sheehan as chairman together with a young Carrick-on-Suir solicitor J. J. O'Shee as its secretary. It was formed to agitate on behalf of small tenant farmers and agrarian labourers, as a follower organisation to Michael Davitt's and Michael Austin's 1890-founded Irish Democratic Trade and Labour Federation, setting forth its broad but short-lived achievements.

Sheehan founded the Association to pursue tenant-farmer and labourer's grievances as a labour lobby within the nationalist movement, demanding radical changes to the inadequate Irish Land Acts. With labourers "as strangers in a strange land, without influence and without rights" it was to be expected that obstructions placed in the path of the labourers' welfare by landowners and farmers would invite bitter recrimination at the new Associations meetings. The Association would prove itself to be the most enduring of the labour groups. Agrarian agitation was unique in that it was an all-Ireland agitation. Ulster tenant-farmers and labourers equally demanded rights, their movement the Farmers and Labourers Union led by T. W. Russell. The Irish Trade Union Congress passed a motion in 1896 which recommended that in every parish in Ireland, a branch of the ILLA be founded.

== Programme ==
The passing of the revolutionary Local Government (Ireland) Act 1898, a "grass roots home rule" Act, totally reorganised the old aristocratic landlord "Grand Juries", eliminating their power by transferring it to Local County Councils elected by tenant farmers, town traders and labourers. The creation of the new councils had a significant effect on Ireland as it allowed local people to take decisions affecting themselves. The county and the sub-county District Councils also created a political platform for proponents of Irish Home Rule, displacing Unionist influence in many areas. The enfranchisement of local electors allowed the development of a new political class, creating a significant body of experienced politicians who began to take local affairs into their own hands. This coincided with William O'Brien founding the United Irish League (UIL), the wide expansion of the agricultural co-operative movement established earlier by Horace Plunkett and Sheehan becoming both President of the ILLA and editor of the Skibbereen based The Southern Star newspaper. He assured that the ILLA as well as the UIL were given weekly press coverage of their branch reports, particularly crucial for the expansion and growth of the UIL in Cork.

The Act was immediately recognised by the labourers, who for the first time held both active and passive electoral franchise, as a means to achieving their interests and facilitating those who desired to help them on local county councils. The prospects offered by the Act of radically overhauling the socio-economic distribution of political power in the countryside was not lost on the labourer movement. The ILLA took resolute steps to both organise the voting power of the labourers and to see to the 'proposal of labour candidates'.

Modelling themselves on Davitt's concepts, the ILLA platform included demands for:

1. – land for the people
2. – houses for the people
3. – work and wages for the people
4. – education for the people
5. – state pensions for old people
6. – all local rents shall be paid by the ground landlords.

Its strategy was to achieve these through political and parliamentary leverage, pressure of the press and public agitation rather than by physical-force means or trade union action.

== Objectives ==
The name of the association was somewhat anomalous, as it strived to represent and pursue the twofold interests of small tenant farmers and rural agrarian labourers. Both were a deprived and down trodden class supporting each other in their common plight, tenant farmers paying excessive rents or suffering eviction, labourers "compelled to live in hovels not fit to house the brute beast of the field" (Sheehan's later House of Commons speech). The objectives of the ILLA were therefore to achieve tenant land purchase, new and improved housing, welfare working conditions and access to land holdings for rural labourers.

ILLA concern for other labour issues developed after the Local Government Act transferred responsibility for cottage building, land reclamation, drainage, road building, their repair and maintenance, to the County and District Councils. This called for considerable ILLA involvement when it came to tenders for contract work and the fair employment of local contractors and labour, settling disputes and complaints, often arising out of local political patronage. The situation of previously evicted tenants, now reduced to landless labourers, was also on their agenda.

== Propertied classes' hostility ==
However where initial success such as the election of five of the Association's Central Council to County Councils, it was nullified by the continued domination of farmers and landowners in the local authorities. Where the Land and Labour Association clashed with the propertied classes' interests, it was excluded from all effective political action, which even led to the exclusion of the labourers from United Irish League meetings. The belief of J.F.X. O'Brien and others was that there should be no separate labour organisation alongside the UIL, which attempted to tactfully bring the Association and its followers under its wing. John Redmond's sedulous refusal to consider direct Parliamentary representation for the Land and Labour Association was but an instance of the propertied classes' obsession with maintaining their hold over national politics.

The desire to keep the labouring classes in tow prompted the United Irish League to eventually give the Land and Labour Association entry to national councils in 1900. The failure of the UIL and the Irish Party to either refer to the labourers in their deliberations or to do anything for them at Westminster indicated the Associations intended subservient position. It took the Mid-Cork by-election of 1901 to show that the understanding between the UIL and the ILLA was paper-thin. When it became clear that the ILLA candidate, D. D. Sheehan, was going to make an impact, he was accused of being an "anti-Healyite" and that his first allegiance was to the labourers rather than to the party, expressed the class bias of the Irish Party against the workers.

== Land proprietors ==
By the turn of the century the working class segment of the electorate were a new labour power to be reckoned with, a very worthy class to be courted and flattered at election time. They displayed their depth of support for the labour movement in Cork at the UIL selection convention for the Mid-Cork by-election of May 1901. Amidst turbulent and occasionally violent scenes in Macroom on 10 May, their President D. D. Sheehan, standing on a strictly labour platform, defeated the local UIL candidate of the Irish Party on a second ballot. This after an initial attempt by Joseph Devlin (representing the UIL National Directory), to exclude a number of ILLA branches from the convention. In this respect Sheehans' return on a labour-nationalist ticket as Mid-Cork Member of Parliament (1901–1918) to the House of Commons exposed the divide between rural labourers and the elitist nationalism of the UIL/IPP classes, which was to deepen by the end of the decade.

Rural workers were quick to grasp the potential of local democracy for plots, cottages and direct labour on council road-works. Their ILLA organisation had grown to 98 branches by 1899, expanding to 144 branches in 1904 mainly in counties Cork, Limerick and Tipperary.

UIL agitation by tenant farmers continued to press for compulsory land purchase and resulted in the calling of the December 1902 Land Conference, an initiative by moderate landlords led by Lord Dunraven on the one hand and William O'Brien, John Redmond MP, Timothy Harrington MP and Ulster's T. W. Russell MP representing tenant farmers on the other hand. It strove for a settlement by conciliatory agreement between landlord and tenant. After six sittings all eight tenant's demands were conceded, O'Brien having guided the official nationalist movement into endorsement of a new policy of conciliation. He followed this by campaigning vigorously for the greatest piece of social legislation Ireland had yet seen, orchestrating the Wyndham Land Purchase Act (1903) through Parliament. The Act provided very generous bonus subsidy terms to landowners on sale.

Purchases between tenants and landlords were negotiated by Sheehan and the ILLA branches after O'Brien and Sheehan formed a Cork Advisory Committee in September 1904, to mediate between landlords and tenants in their negotiations. They thereby achieved purchase terms with low interest annuities which produced an exceptionally high take-up of land purchase. Munster tenants availed of land purchase in higher numbers than in any other province, whereby in county Cork alone there were 16,159 tenant land purchases, the highest numbers of any single county.

The Act effectively fulfilled the first important demand of the ILLA, the abolition of "landlordism", replaced by land purchase, to finally resolve the Land Question. The result was the formation of a new proud farming proprietorship and the steady extinction of the dominant Anglo-Irish landed gentry. Whereas in 1870 only 3% of Irish farmers owned their land, by 1908, this jumped to nearly 50%. By the early 1920s, the figure was at 70%, the process being later completed.

Despite some deficiencies of the Land Act, O'Brien could take some pride in its working since its passage. The social effects of the Act were immediate The year 1903 alone saw a 33% drop in reports of intimidation, a 70% decline in boycotting cases, 60% fewer people needing police protection, and a 50% decrease in the number and acreage of grazing farms unlet or unstocked because of agitation. In the period 1903 to 1909 over 200,000 small peasant tenant-farmers became "owneroccupiers" of their holdings under the Acts. By 1914 75% of occupiers were buying out their landlords under the 1903 Act and the later Birrell Land Purchase (Ireland) Act (1909) which extended the 1903 Act by allowing for the compulsory purchase of tenanted farmland by the Land Commission. In all, under these pre-1921 Land Acts over 316,000 tenants purchased their holdings amounting to 115 million acres (470,000 km^{2}) out of a total of 20 million in the country.

== Cottage ownership ==
In November 1903 O'Brien left the Irish Party when his policy of "conciliation" with landowners was rejected by the party leaders John Redmond and John Dillon, who feared O'Brien's course and popularity would drive a wedge between the farming and labouring community allegiance to the Irish party.

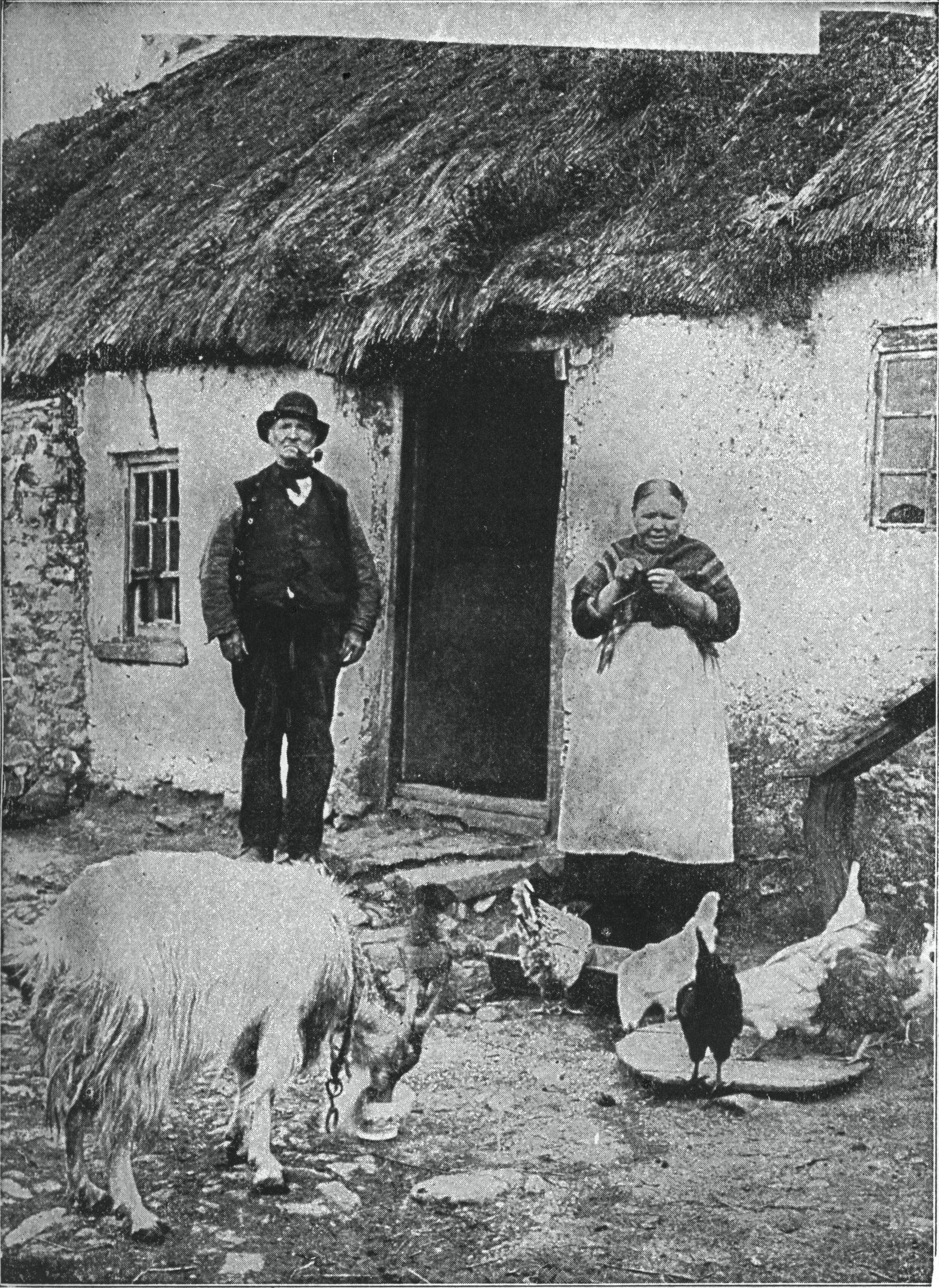
Early Irish cottage homestead

O'Brien then joined forces a year later with Sheehan's ILLA organisation, identifying himself with Sheehan's demand for agricultural labourers' housing, who up to then were dependent on limited provision of cottages by local County Councils or landowners at unfavourable terms. A breakthrough occurred when a scheme was made public at "the largest labour demonstration ever held in Ireland" (Cork Examiner), a memorable rally in Macroom on 10 December 1904 addressed by William O'Brien. His concepts became known as the 'Macroom Programme', its principles and measures subsequently carried into law in 1906.

The Second Phase of the Labourers Acts (1906–1914) began after the unprecedented Labourers (Ireland) Act, long demanded by the ILLA was won in 1906, for which both the Redmondite and O'Brienite factions were zealous in claiming credit. Credit was also claimed for an O'Brien ally, Thomas Russell, MP, the son of an evicted Scottish crofter, who had broken with the Conservatives in the Irish Unionist Alliance and was returned to Westminster from South Tyrone as the champion of the Ulster Farmers and Labourers Union.

The so-called 'Labourers Act' provided large scale funding for extensive state sponsored housing to accommodate rural labourers and others of the working classes. The labourer-owned cottages erected by the Local County Councils brought about a major socio-economic transformation, by simultaneously erasing the previous inhuman habitations. O'Brien saying that the Labourers Acts – "were scarcely less wonderworking than the abolition of landlordism itself". In 1904 Davitt going so far as to declare that the Labourers Acts constituted – "a rational principle of state Socialism".

In the next five years the programme produced a complete 'municipalisation' of over 40,000 additional commodious working-class dwellings dotting the rural Irish countryside, 7,560 cottages erected in County Cork in co-ordination with Sheehan and the ILLA branches became known locally as "Sheehans' cottages". At first the compulsory surrender of an acre of choice land to each labourer who claimed it was resisted by the new land owning farmers. In due course they too reaped the benefits. Now occupying their own family home and vegetable patch at the corner of his farm, they worked for him all year round. This had long-term consequences for rural Irish society.

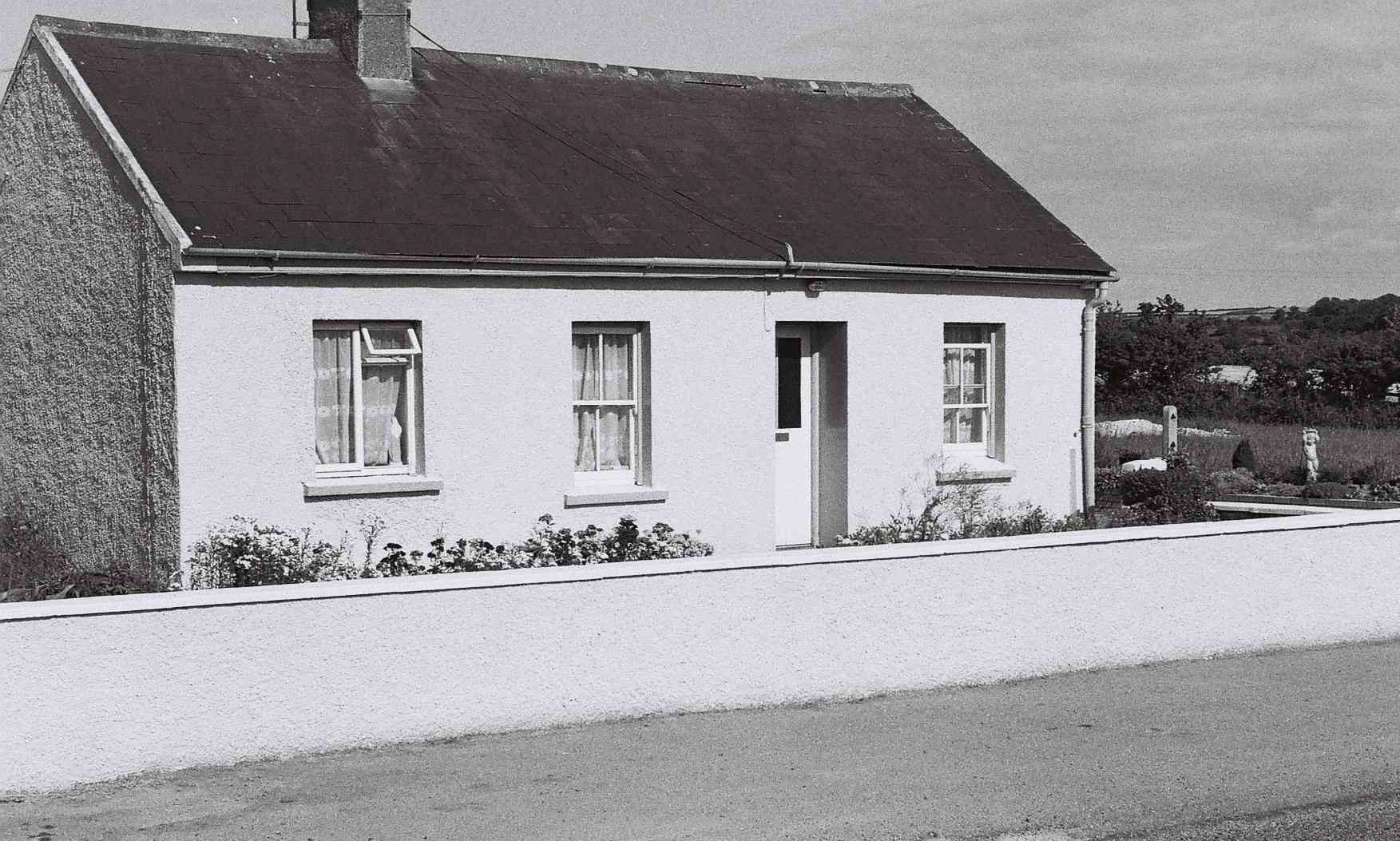
Original 1906 Labourers' Act Cottage, known locally as a Sheehans' Cottage, pictured in 1977

Only 17 per cent of labourers had lived in houses with five or more rooms in 1841; in 1861 one rural family in ten still lived in what were classed by the census as fourth class accommodation, essentially meaning one room per family. By 1911 only one per cent of families did. The bulk of the labourers' cottages were erected by 1916, resulting in a widespread decline of rampant tuberculosis, typhoid and scarlet fever. Up to a quarter of a million were housed under the Labourers Acts by 1921. It is not an exaggeration to term it a social revolution, in a sense it was the first large-scale public-housing schemes in the country, a development neglected by historians, because the houses, rural based and more scattered, were not as evident as the urban tenements, that officialdom would not even look into.

== Aims accomplished ==
Additional funding for the erection of a further 5000 cottages was won under the follow-on Labourers (Ireland) Act 1911, Sheehan making the concluding speech during the passage of the bill. Although he retired from the LLA in 1910, Sheehan remained active in the labour movement as its leader in Munster. Around 1912, Ireland was economically one of the prosperous small countries of Europe. D. D. Sheehan maintained in 1921, that the labourers, as a result of these housing acts (particularly the landmark 1906 bill),

"were no longer a people to be kicked and cuffed and ordered about by the schoneens and squireens of the district; they became a very worthy class indeed, to be courted and flattered at election times and wheedled with all sorts of fair promises of what could be done for them".

Having successfully settled the main grievances of small tenant farmers and agrarian labourers, O'Brien and Sheehan moved on by turning their attention to the unresolved question of the Home Rule Movement, founding for this purpose a new organisation, the All-for-Ireland League, many LLA branches joining the League.

== Adversity ==
The Irish Parliamentary Party, after had it alienated O'Brien from the party in 1903, tried by every means to curtail his activities after he became associated with Sheehan's ILLA, regarding their conciliatory approach in the land question as a dangerous deviation from party policy. In the manner in which the Party took control of O'Brien's UIL through the involvement of Joseph Devlin, Redmond and Dillon were determined to undermine O'Brien and "squelch that body by getting a few reliable Munster MPs to start a new Land and Labour group and claim it as the legitimate continuation of the original association". In 1905, Dillon's loyal "Redmonite" ally and ILLA secretary J. J. O'Shee was tasked with forming a break-away 'party-subservient' organisation in answer to Sheehan's domination of the original one. Sheehan had however created that domination in order to

realize the great democratic principle of the government of the people by the people and for the people

in the teeth of party autocracy. A larger section, mainly in counties Cork, Limerick, Kerry and Tipperary, followed Sheehan who renamed it the 'Land and Labour Association' (LLA). Its members sat on most Rural and District County Councils. Splitting-off and in-fighting became symptomatic of all national movements after the Parnell split.

O'Brien and some others rejoined the IPP in 1908 for the sake of unity, but he was again driven out on the occasion of the rigged Dublin National Convention in February 1909, called the "Baton Convention", in a dispute over the financial arrangements for the next stage of the 1909 Land Purchase Act. Regarding himself as having been driven from the party by Hibernian hooligans, O'Brien formed a new movement, the "All-for-Ireland League". By January 1910 further ILLA groups split off, in Cork city P. J. Bradley, building an empire on the title, and William Field MP, as president of a Dublin-based Land and Labour League (LLL), each claiming Irish Party credit for the earlier ILLA achievements. Sheehan resigned the LLA presidency in July 1910, his colleague Cornelius Buckley taking over. Cork then had three LLA factions from 1910 to 1915.

This greatly damaged the labourer's movement as soon nobody knew which organisation they belonged to. In other counties where branches were long established, they remained independent with divergent local activities, in some cases in Connacht under R. A. Corr, with the dual title Trade and Labour Association (T&LA), as successor to Davitt's Democratic Labour Federation.

== New Labour ==
By the end of 1919, most ILLA and LLA branches had completed amalgamation with the expanding Irish Transport and General Workers' Union (ITGWU), some independent branches remaining active in outlying areas of Munster and Connacht into the 1920s, when they in turn fused with the ITGWU, all forming the basis of the new labour movement. Thomas Johnson, first parliamentary leader of the Irish Labour Party is recorded as saying that Labour's strength outside of the urban areas could in part be attributed to the role played by organisations such as the ILLA.

Following the Great War a further 5000 cottage homes were built in both parts of Ireland for returning soldiers, under the Irish Land (Provision for Sailors and Soldiers) Act 1919 which related to the provision of cottages, plots, or gardens and the building of mostly small new housing estates for the veterans at the edge of towns. It was effected by the "Irish soldiers' and sailors' Land Trust", which co-operated with the new Irish Free State.

Later Irish governments continued rural cottage building well into the middle of the 20th. Century, though at a much slower rate, local government funding now largely focused on developing urban rather than hitherto rural housing.
