= 1911 Dublin Corporation election =

Local election in Ireland

An election to Dublin Corporation took place in March 1911 as part of that year's Irish local elections. The election saw a decline for Sinn Féin, with the Unionists regaining their position as the councils second party.

== Council composition following election ==
Party	Seats	±	Votes	%	±%
Irish Nationalist	61	▲6			
Irish Unionist	10	▲1			
Sinn Féin	5	▼6			
LEA	2	▼3			
Independent	2	▲2			
Totals	80			100%	—

== Ward results ==
=== Clontarf West ===
==== Councillor ====
Clontarf West Ward Electorate: 988
Party	Candidate	Votes	%	±%
Irish Unionist	William Ireland J.P. (incumbent)	390	50.85	
United Irish League	John Doyle	377	49.15	
Majority		13	1.70	
Turnout		767	77.63	
Irish Unionist hold		Swing		

=== Drumcondra ===
==== Councillor ====
Drumcondra Ward Electorate: 2,040
Party	Candidate	Votes	%	±%
Ind. Nationalist	David A. Quaid	747		
United Irish League	Thomas J. Lawlor	522		
Majority		125		
Turnout		1,269		
Ind. Nationalist hold		Swing		

=== Fitzwilliam ===
==== Councillor ====
Fitzwilliam Ward Electorate: 1,959
Party	Candidate	Votes	%	±%
United Irish League	James M. Gallagher (incumbent)	776		
Irish Unionist	Isaac Molloy	418		
Majority		358		
Turnout		1,194		
United Irish League hold		Swing		

=== Glasnevin ===
==== Councillor ====
Glasnevin Ward Electorate: 1,796
Party	Candidate	Votes	%	±%
United Irish League	J. Cummins J.P. (incumbent)	587		
	Richard Collis	415		
Majority		92		
Turnout		1,002		
United Irish League hold		Swing		

=== New Kilmainham ===
==== Alderman ====
New Kilmainham Ward Electorate: 1,555
Party	Candidate	Votes	%	±%
United Irish League	John Murray	651	59.45	
Ind. Nationalist	W. E. Reigh (incumbent)	423	38.63	
Ind. Nationalist	M. O'Rourke	12	1.10	
Ind. Nationalist	Arthur Bacon	7	0.64	
Ind. Nationalist	Samuel Bond	2	0.18	
Majority		228	20.82	
Turnout		1,095	70.42	
United Irish League gain from Ind. Nationalist		Swing		

=== Inns Quay ===
==== Councillor ====
Inns Quay Ward Electorate: 3,156
Party	Candidate	Votes	%	±%
United Irish League	Gerald Begg (incumbent)	802		
	John Lawlor	705		
	Patrick Joseph Lawlor	51		
	James Clinch	6		
	John Flood	4		
	Thomas Kenny	3		
	William M. Loughlin	2		
	Patrick Moloney	1		
Majority		97		
Turnout		1,574		
United Irish League hold		Swing		

=== Mansion House ===
==== Councillor ====
Mansion House Ward Electorate: 1,627
Party	Candidate	Votes	%	±%
United Irish League	Thomas O'Brien	508		
	Michael J. Carroll	378		
Majority		130		
Turnout		886		
United Irish League hold		Swing		

=== North Dock ===
==== Councillor ====
North Dock Ward Electorate: 3,572
Party	Candidate	Votes	%	±%
United Irish League	Alfred Byrne	1,045	69.2	
Sinn Féin	Paul Gregan (incumbent)	466	30.8	
Majority		579	38.4	N/A
Turnout		1,511		
United Irish League gain from Sinn Féin		Swing		

=== Royal Exchange ===
==== Councillor ====
Royal Exchange Ward Electorate: 1,413
Party	Candidate	Votes	%	±%
United Irish League	John Doyle (incumbent)	344		
	Louis F. Harrison	152		
Majority		188		
Turnout		1,511		
United Irish League hold		Swing		

=== South City ===
==== Alderman ====
South City Ward Electorate: 1,049
Party	Candidate	Votes	%	±%
Dublin Citizens Association (DCA)	Ernest Bewley T.C.	454		
United Irish League	Robert O'Reilly (incumbent)	389		
Majority		65		
Turnout		843		
Dublin Citizens Association (DCA) hold		Swing		

==== Councillor ====
South City Ward Electorate: 1,049
Party	Candidate	Votes	%	±%
Dublin Citizens Association (DCA)	Andrew Beattie	439		
United Irish League	James J. O'Neill (incumbent)	402		
Majority		37		
Turnout		841		
Dublin Citizens Association (DCA) gain from United Irish League		Swing		
