= Land Acts (Ireland) =

United Kingdom legislation

The Land Acts (officially Land Law (Ireland) Acts) were a series of measures to deal with the question of tenancy contracts and peasant proprietorship of land in Ireland in the nineteenth and twentieth centuries. Five such acts were introduced by the government of the United Kingdom between 1870 and 1909. Further acts were introduced by the governments of the Irish Free State after 1922 and more acts were passed for Northern Ireland.

The success of the Land Acts in reducing the concentration of land ownership is indicated by the fact that in 1870, only 3% of Irish farmers owned their own land while 97% were tenants. By 1929, this ratio had been reversed with 97.4% of farmers holding their farms in freehold. However, as Michael Davitt and other Georgists had foreseen, peasant proprietorship did not end hardship in the Irish countryside. Emigration and economic disadvantage continued while the greatest beneficiaries of land reform were the middle class of medium farmers.

== Landlord and Tenant (Ireland) Act 1870 ==
=== Background ===
The British Prime Minister, William Ewart Gladstone, had taken up the "Irish question" in an effort to win the general election of 1868 by uniting the Liberal Party behind this single issue. The shock of Fenian violence, especially in England, as well as the growing awareness of the potency of strong nationalist feelings in pan-European politics, was a second reason to tackle the Irish question. Gladstone desired to bring peace with fairness to Ireland, and by extension, the rest of the UK, which was then at the zenith of worldwide Imperial power. The Landlord and Tenant (Ireland) Act 1870 (33 & 34 Vict. c. 46) was partly the work of Chichester Fortescue, John Bright and Gladstone. The Irish situation was favourable, with agriculture improving and pressure on the land decreasing since the Great Irish Famine. The Encumbered Estates' Court (1849) and agitation by the Tenant Right League had led to the sale of estates by debt-ridden mainly absentee landlords. Gladstone's Liberal government had no explicit mandate for the Act, unlike the Irish Church Act 1869, and so could expect some opposition from the English landlord class in the House of Lords, fearful for the implications of property rights in England, many of whom were Whigs that Gladstone relied on for support in Parliament. Partly for this reason, Gladstone's approach was cautious, even conservative, for he was dedicated to maintaining the landlord class whose "social and moral influence", he said in 1863, was "absolutely essential to the welfare of the country." Furthermore, Gladstone met resistance from Whigs in his Cabinet itself, especially Robert Lowe, and the resulting compromise measure was so weak that it had little difficulty in passing both Houses of Parliament, with one significant amendment. As well as the Land Act, the Liberal government also passed the Irish Church Act 1869 and put forward the Irish University Bill that failed to pass both Houses of Parliament.

Policymakers made much use of the statistical data recently collated in Griffith's Valuation (1853–68).

=== Terms ===
1. The Ulster custom or any similar custom prevailing elsewhere, was given the force of law where it existed.
2. Tenants not enjoying this protection (the vast majority) gained increased security by:

a) compensation for improvements made to a farm if they surrendered their lease (these had previously been accredited to the landlord, hence no incentive to the tenant);
b) compensation for 'disturbance', i.e. damages, for tenants evicted for causes other than non-payment of rent.

3. The John Bright Clauses, which Gladstone accepted reluctantly, allowed tenants to borrow from the government two-thirds of the cost of buying their holding, at 5% interest repayable over 35 years, provided the landlord was willing to sell (no compulsory powers).

To prevent eviction by rack-renting, and so avoiding paying compensation to tenants, the Bill said that rents must not be "excessive", leaving this for the courts to define. But the House of Lords in a wrecking amendment substituted "exorbitant" in its place. This enabled landlords to raise rents above what tenants could pay, and then to evict them for non-payment without giving any compensation.

=== Consequences ===
However well-intentioned, the act was at best irrelevant, at worst counter-productive. Fewer than 1,000 tenants took up the Bright Clauses, since the terms were beyond most tenants and many landlords did not wish to sell. Many substantial leasehold farmers, who had led the campaign for land reform, were excluded from the act because their leases were longer than 31 years. Legal disputes over customary rights and "exorbitant" rents actually worsened landlord-tenant relations. Figures do not indicate any impact of the act on the rate of eviction, which was anyway at a low level. In the late 1870s when depression struck, evictions for non-payment of rent mounted, tenants had no protection, and in reply 'outrages' and the campaign by the Land League, led by Michael Davitt, became known as the Land War. The government had to pass a Coercion Act as early as 1881 (the Protection of Persons and Property (Ireland) Act 1881 (44 & 45 Vict. c. 4)) because of the increase in violence in Ireland; it lost support to the Home Rule Movement, which won nine out of 14 Irish by-elections between 1870 and 1874, mainly formerly Liberal-held seats.

Friedrich Engels, a contemporary observer, professed not to know "what the Tories could have against this Bill, which is so indulgent with the Irish landlords and finally places their interests in the tested hands of the Irish lawyers". He thought it "very amusing if the brave Gladstone thinks he has settled the Irish question by means of this new prospect of endless lawsuits". The legislation, however, "had a symbolic significance far beyond its immediate effects." The Land Act turned the tide of laissez faire legislation favouring capitalist landlordism, and in principle, if not in practice, was a defeat for the concept of the absolute right of property. For the first time in Ireland tenants now had a legal interest in their holdings.

== Bessborough Commission ==
The "Report of her Majesty's Commissioners of Enquiry into the working of the Landlord and Tenant (Ireland) Act 1870 (33 & 34 Vict. c. 46) and the acts amending the same", under the chairmanship of the 6th Earl of Bessborough and hence commonly known as the "Bessborough Commission Report," was published in 1881 after lengthy hearings in 1880. It reported that the 1870 act gave the tenant no real protection because compensation for improvements could be claimed only on giving up the lease and because tenants saw themselves as forced to accept rent increases to avoid sacrificing what they had put into their holdings. It declared, "Freedom of contract, in the case of the majority of Irish tenants, large and small, does not really exist". By a majority of four-to-one (Arthur MacMurrough Kavanagh dissenting) the commissioners declared in favour of the "Three Fs" as demanded by the Land League: fair rent, free sale, and fixity of tenure.

== Agricultural depression ==
From 1873 to 1896, farmers in Britain and Ireland suffered the "Long Depression" with its lower prices. Grain from America was cheaper and better, and was exported to Europe in ever-increasing amounts. Meat could be sent in refrigerated ships from as far as New Zealand and Argentina. For many tenant farmers in Ireland this meant lower net incomes with which to pay the rents they had agreed. This impacted most on the poorer, wetter western parts of the island that also suffered from the 1879 famine. This provided the context and arguments for further legal reforms.

== Land Law (Ireland) Act 1881 ==
The Land Law (Ireland) Act 1881 (44 & 45 Vict. c. 49) gave tenants real security, though by this time the Irish were demanding proprietorship. The act established the principle of dual ownership by landlord and tenant, gave legal status to the Custom of Ulster throughout the country, provided for compensation for improvements and created the Irish Land Commission and a Land Court. In Gladstone's words, the intention of the act was to make landlordism impossible. However, it was a complicated piece of legislation though it did provide for land purchase, three-quarters of the money to be advanced by the Land Commission, and to be repaid over 35 years at 5% interest. Under the Act, 731 tenants became proprietors. More important was the fact that tenants had the right to take their rents to the Land Court for reduction under the fair rent clause, where in most cases a reduction of between 15% and 20% was awarded.

Despite a short-term reduction of rents (by about 20% by 1882) this act can generally be seen as economically ineffective. Instead of cutting costs or increasing productivity, Irish farmers increasingly turned to the Irish land courts to cut their rents and jack up their dwindling incomes. The land purchase element can be described as counterproductive because the conditions tenants now enjoyed under this act gave them no incentive to buy, furthermore, some economic historians dispute the effectiveness of land purchase as a solution to the Irish land problem. Land purchase significantly reduced the amount of capital in Ireland that could have been invested to improve efficiency and competitiveness of Irish farms. Therefore, some headway is made towards lower rents but this is at the cost of lower rates of productivity growth in Irish farming.

Arrears of Rent (Ireland) Act 1882 (Note: Section 24.)
- Act of Parliament
- Parliament of the United Kingdom
- Long title: An Act to make provision respecting certain Arrears of Rent in Ireland.
- Citation: 45 & 46 Vict. c. 47
- Territorial extent: United Kingdom

Dates
- Royal assent: 18 August 1882
- Commencement: 18 August 1882 (Note: The Acts of Parliament (Commencement) Act 1793.)
- Repealed: 18 December 1953
Other legislation
Repealed by	Statute Law Revision Act 1953

Status: Repealed

Text of statute as originally enacted

The Arrears of Rent (Ireland) Act 1882 (45 & 46 Vict. c. 47) was the result of the No Rent Manifesto and the subsequent Kilmainham Treaty made between Parnell and Gladstone by which the Land Commission was empowered to cancel arrears of less than thirty pounds due by tenants. Two million pounds in arrears were estimated to have been written off.

The act was further amended by Arthur Balfour: the Land Law (Ireland) Act 1887 (50 & 51 Vict. c. 33) extended the terms of the act to leaseholders.

=== Overview ===
The flawed economics that lay behind these acts exposes a political aim on Gladstone's part, to destroy the raison d'être of the Land League (following the recent Land War). Although the second Land Act ushered in a period of tentative calm, it became clear further reforms were necessary.

The act undermined the Land League by granting fair-rent control, fixity of tenure on leases, and freedom of sale: all to be overseen by the new government-sponsored Irish Land Commission. The 1881 act involved state participation in the redistribution of land-ownership. Because of attacks on landlords, the police and witnesses, the Protection of Persons and Property (Ireland) Act 1881 was passed, which added to the atmosphere of distrust of the authorities. An overview of the land war, the reforms and the effect of the Coercion Act was published in 1888 by the journalist WH Hurlbert, an Irish-American Catholic.

A symbolic significance of these land acts are how far Gladstone had come from his starting point. Judicial control of rent levels and the establishment of many land courts was a change from Gladstone's policy of 'retrenchment' and his commitment to free markets.

An added consequence of the land acts was the gradual displacement of the Protestant Ascendancy during the latter 19th and early 20th centuries accompanied by the disestablishment of the Church of Ireland by the Irish Church Act 1869. Some "Ascendancy" land-owning families like the Marquess of Headfort and the Earl of Granard had by then converted to Catholicism, and a considerable number of Protestant Nationalists had already taken their part in Irish history. A survey of the 4,000 largest landlords in 1872 revealed that already 43% were Roman Catholics, 48% were Church of Ireland, 7% were Presbyterians, and 2% unknown. The term "Protestant Ascendancy" was used from 1879 to 1890 in the Land War and the Plan of Campaign as an emotional term in what was an economic dispute. Religious affiliation was used as a factor as 55% of the largest estates were held by Protestants or Presbyterians in a country overwhelmingly Catholic. However, the "war" applied to landlords of all religions and none.

The pace for land law reforms quickened after the Representation of the People Act 1884, which gave a much greater number of votes to the Irish rural electorate.

== Purchase of Land (Ireland) Act 1885 (Ashbourne Land Act) ==
Continued land agitations throughout the 1880s and 1890s culminated firstly with the passing of the Purchase of Land (Ireland) Act 1885 (48 & 49 Vict. c. 73), named the "Ashbourne Act" for Lord Ashbourne, putting limited tenant land purchase in motion. The act allowed a tenant to borrow the full amount of the purchase price, to be repaid at 4% over 49 years. Five million pounds sterling were made available, and about 25,400 tenants purchased their holdings during the period up to 1888, many in Ulster. In all 942,600 acres (3,815 km^{2}) were purchased, which made an average holding of 37 acres (150,000 m^{2}). The purchase price was equal to 17½ years rental.

Land Law (Ireland) Act 1888 (Note: Section 2.)
- Act of Parliament
- Parliament of the United Kingdom
- Long title: An Act to amend Section One of the Land Law (Ireland) Act, 1887, in regard to Leaseholders.
- Citation: 51 & 52 Vict. c. 13
- Territorial extent: United Kingdom

Dates
- Royal assent: 28 June 1888
- Commencement: 28 June 1888
- Repealed: 23 May 1950
Other legislation
Amends	Land Law (Ireland) Act 1887
Amended by	Land Law (Ireland) Act 1888 Amendment Act 1889
Repealed by	Statute Law Revision Act 1950

Status: Repealed

Text of statute as originally enacted

The act was amended by the Land Law (Ireland) Act 1888 (51 & 52 Vict. c. 13), providing a further five million to the amount granted for purchase under the Ashbourne Act.

== Land Law (Ireland) Act 1887 (Balfour) ==
Land Law (Ireland) Act 1887 (Note: Section 35.)
- Act of Parliament
- Parliament of the United Kingdom
- Long title: An Act to amend the Land Law (Ireland) Act, 1881, and the Purchase of Land (Ireland) Act, 1885, and for other purposes connected therewith.
- Citation: 50 & 51 Vict. c. 33
- Territorial extent: United Kingdom

Dates
- Royal assent: 23 August 1887
- Commencement: 23 August 1887 (Note: Section 1.)
Other legislation
Amends	Landlord and Tenant (Ireland) Act 1870; Landlord and Tenant (Ireland) Act 1872; Land Law (Ireland) Act 1881; Purchase of Land (Ireland) Act 1885
Amended by	Land Law (Ireland) Act 1888; Land Law (Ireland) Act 1896; Statute Law Revision Act 1950; Judicature (Northern Ireland) Act 1978; Property (Northern Ireland) Order 1997

Status: Amended

Text of statute as originally enacted

The Land Law (Ireland) Act 1887 (50 & 51 Vict. c. 33) was Arthur Balfour's major Land Act, which came at the end of the 'Plan of Campaign' agitation. It provided £33,000,000 sterling for land purchase, but contained many complicated legal clauses, so that it was not put fully into effect until amended five years later. At this point only £13,500,000 had been employed. It substituted peasant proprietorship for dual ownership as the principle of land tenure. At the same time Balfour created the Congested Districts Board to deal with distress in the backward areas of the west of Ireland.

Land Law (Ireland) Act 1896 (Note: Section 51.)
- Act of Parliament
- Parliament of the United Kingdom
- Long title: An Act to further amend the Law relating to the Occupation and Ownership of Land in Ireland, and for other purposes relating thereto.
- Citation: 59 & 60 Vict. c. 47
- Territorial extent: United Kingdom

Dates
- Royal assent: 14 August 1896
- Commencement: 14 August 1896
Other legislation
Amends	Land Law (Ireland) Act 1881; Purchase of Land (Ireland) Act 1885; Land Law (Ireland) Act 1887; Purchase of Land (Ireland) Amendment Act 1888; Purchase of Land (Ireland) Act 1891; Redemption of Rent (Ireland) Act 1891
Amended by	Congested Districts Board (Ireland) Act 1899; Purchase of Land (Ireland) Act 1901; Irish Land Act 1903; Labourers (Ireland) Act 1906; Statute Law Revision Act 1908; Irish Land Act 1909; Northern Ireland Land Act 1925; Statute Law Revision Act 1950; Property (Northern Ireland) Order 1997

Status: Amended

Text of statute as originally enacted

The act was amended by the Land Law (Ireland) Act 1896 (59 & 60 Vict. c. 47), increasing the amount available for purchase and removing the clauses which had made the act unattractive. The Land Courts were empowered to sell 1,500 bankrupt estates to tenants. A total of 47,000 holdings were bought out between 1891 and 1896.

Local government was introduced two years later under the revolutionary Local Government (Ireland) Act 1898, which in turn contributed to the success of the United Irish League (UIL) in the 1900 general election, laying the foundation for a lasting solution in the land question.

== Land Purchase (Ireland) Act 1903 (Wyndham Land Act) ==
Irish Land Act 1903 (Note: Section 101.)
- Act of Parliament
- Parliament of the United Kingdom
- Long title: An Act to amend the Law relating to the occupation and ownership of Land in Ireland and for other purposes relating thereto, and to amend the Labourers (Ireland) Acts.
- Citation: 3 Edw. 7. c. 37
- Territorial extent: United Kingdom

Dates
- Royal assent: 14 August 1903
- Commencement: 1 November 1903 (Note: Section 102.)
Other legislation
Amends	Purchase of Land (Ireland) Act 1835; Landlord and Tenant (Ireland) Act 1870; Land Law (Ireland) Act 1881; Purchase of Land (Ireland) Act 1885; Purchase of Land (Ireland) Act 1891; Labourers (Ireland) Act 1891; Land Law (Ireland) Act 1896; Congested Districts Board (Ireland) Act 1899; Agriculture and Technical Instruction (Ireland) Act 1899; Purchase of Land (Ireland) Act 1901; Congested Districts Board (Ireland) Act 1901
Amended by	Irish Land Act 1904; Labourers (Ireland) Act 1906; Irish Land Act 1907; Irish Land Act 1909; Labourers (Ireland) Act 1919; Northern Ireland Land Act 1925; Northern Ireland (Miscellaneous Provisions) Act 1928; Eire (Confirmation of Agreements) Act 1938; Statute Law Revision Act 1950; Statute Law Revision Act 1953; National Debt Act 1958; Crown Estate Act 1961; Statute Law Revision Act 1963; National Loans Act 1968; Property (Northern Ireland) Order 1997

Status: Amended

Text of statute as originally enacted

Under pressure from both government, UIL and IPP, the Chief Secretary for Ireland, George Wyndham, gave his backing to a Land Conference in December 1902, comprising four moderate landlord representatives led by Lord Dunraven and four tenant representatives led by William O'Brien, the others John Redmond, T. W. Russell (who spoke for Ulster tenant-farmers) and Timothy Harrington. They worked out a new scheme for tenant land purchase, in which sale was to be made not compulsory, but attractive to both parties, based on the government paying the difference between the price offered by tenants and that demanded by landlords. This was the basis of the "Wyndham Act" – the Irish Land Act 1903 (3 Edw. 7. c. 37) or Land Purchase (Ireland) Act 1903 – which O'Brien orchestrated through Parliament.

Irish Land Act 1909 (Note: Section 69.)
- Act of Parliament
- Parliament of the United Kingdom
- Long title: An Act to amend the Law relating to the Occupation and Ownership of Land in Ireland, and for other purposes relating thereto.
- Citation: 9 Edw. 7. c. 42
- Territorial extent: United Kingdom

Dates
- Royal assent: 3 December 1909
- Commencement: 3 December 1909
Other legislation
Amends	Purchase of Land (Ireland) Amendment Act 1888; Purchase of Land (Ireland) Act 1891; Congested Districts Board (Ireland) Act 1893; Land Law (Ireland) Act 1896; Irish Land Act 1903; Irish Land Act 1907
Amended by	Labourers (Ireland) Act 1911; Northern Ireland (Modification of Enactments—No. 1) Order 1999

Status: Amended

Text of statute as originally enacted

It differed from earlier legislation which initially advanced to tenants the sum necessary to purchase their holdings, repayable over a period of years on terms determined by an independent commission, while the Wyndham Act finished off absentee landlords' control over tenants and made it easier for tenants to purchase land, facilitating the transfer of about 9 million acres (36,000 km^{2}) up to 1914. By then 75% of occupiers were buying out their landlords under the Irish Land Act 1903 and the later Irish Land Act 1909 (9 Edw. 7. c. 42) of Augustine Birrell, which extended the Irish Land Act 1903 by allowing for the compulsory purchase of tenanted farmland by the Land Commission, but fell far short in its financial provisions. In all, under these pre-1921 Land Acts over 316,000 tenants purchased their holdings amounting to 11.5 million acres (47,000 km^{2}) out of a total of 20 million acres (81,000 km^{2}) in the country.

The acts provided Irish tenant farmers with more rights than tenant farmers in the rest of the United Kingdom. Munster tenants availed of land purchase in exceptionally high numbers, encouraged by their Irish Land and Labour Association's leader D. D. Sheehan after he and O'Brien established an Advisory Committee to mediate between landlords and tenants on purchase terms which produced a higher take-up of land purchase than in any other province.

Historian R. K. Webb gives most of the credit for the Wyndham Act to Conservative leader Arthur Balfour. He says the act was:

A complete success. By the time the Irish Free State was created in 1922, the system of peasant proprietorship had become universal... A land problem more than a century old had been solved, though it had taken more than 30 years of educating Parliament and landlords to do it. The scheme was intended as well to "kill Home Rule by kindness".

== Labourers (Ireland) Act 1906 ==
Labourers (Ireland) Act 1906 (Note: Section 36.)
- Act of Parliament
- Parliament of the United Kingdom
- Long title: An Act to amend the Law relating to Labourers in Ireland and to make provision with respect to the application of portion of the Ireland Development Grant.
- Citation: 6 Edw. 7. c. 37
- Territorial extent: United Kingdom

Dates
- Royal assent: 4 August 1906
- Commencement: 1 November 1906 (Note: Section 37.)
- Repealed: 21 December 1954
Other legislation
Amends	Labourers (Ireland) Act 1883; Labourers (Ireland) Act 1885; Labourers (Ireland) Act 1886; Purchase of Land (Ireland) Act 1891; Land Law (Ireland) Act 1896; Irish Land Act 1903
Repealed by	Statute Law Revision Act (Northern Ireland) 1954
Relates to	Irish Land (Provision for Sailors and Soldiers) Act 1919

Status: Repealed

Text of statute as originally enacted

Labourers (Ireland) Act 1911 (Note: Section 10.)
- Act of Parliament
- Parliament of the United Kingdom
- Long title: An Act to amend the Law relating to Labourers in Ireland.
- Citation: 1 & 2 Geo. 5. c. 19
- Territorial extent: United Kingdom

Dates
- Royal assent: 18 August 1911
- Commencement: 18 August 1911
Other legislation
Amends	Labourers (Ireland) Act 1906; Irish Land Act 1909

Status: Amended

Text of statute as originally enacted

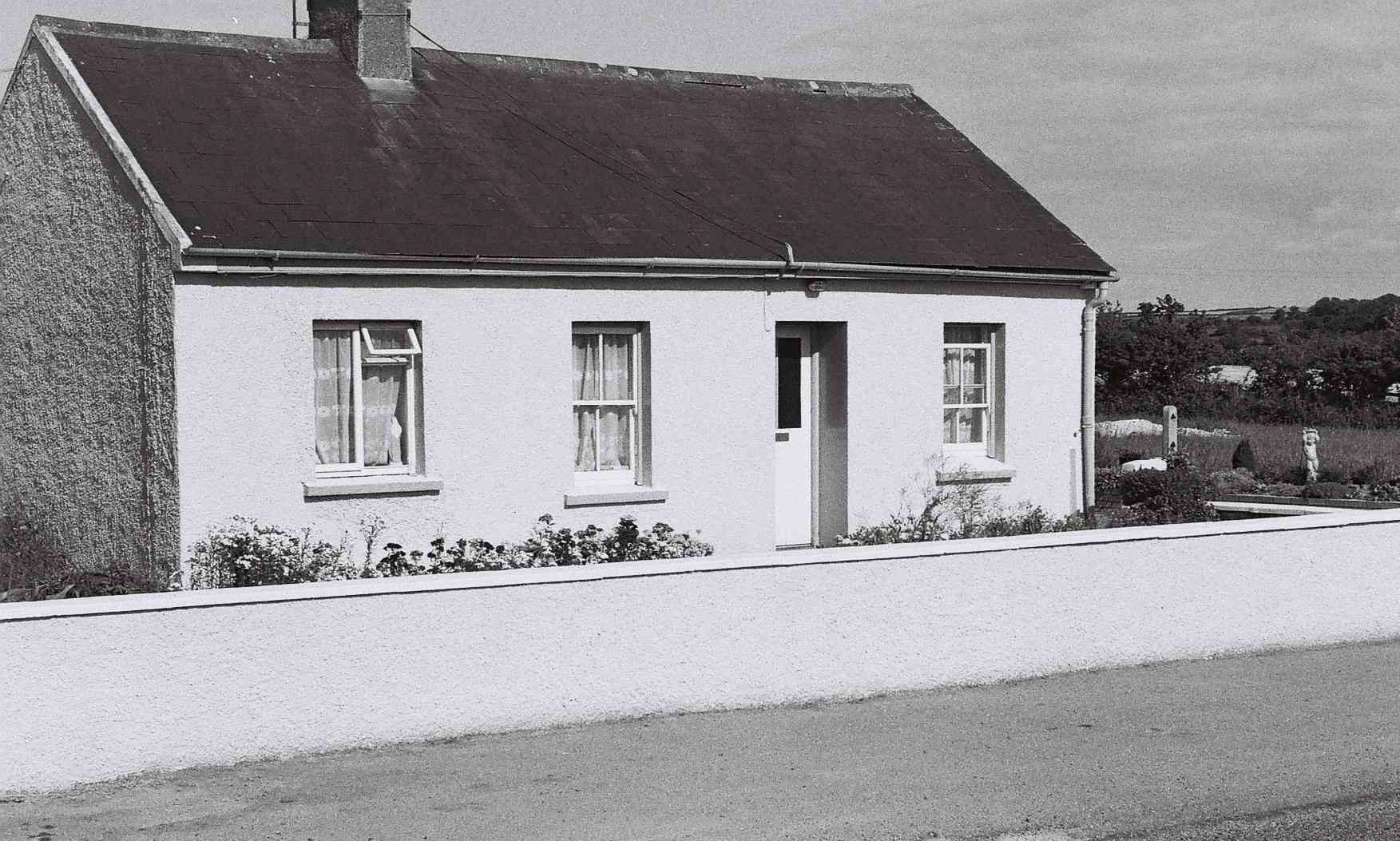
Original 1906 Labourers' Act cottage, as seen in 1977

Labourers (Ireland) Act 1919
- Act of Parliament
- Parliament of the United Kingdom
- Long title: An Act to amend the definition of Agricultural Labourer for the purposes of the Labourers (Ireland) Acts.
- Citation: 9 & 10 Geo. 5. c. 55
- Territorial extent: Ireland

Dates
- Royal assent: 19 August 1919
- Commencement: 19 August 1919
- Repealed: 21 December 1954
Other legislation
Amends	Irish Land Act 1903
Repealed by	Statute Law Revision Act (Northern Ireland) 1954

Status: Repealed

Text of statute as originally enacted

Having largely settled the Irish land question, William O'Brien, convinced by the success of combining the "doctrine of conciliation" with "conference plus business", turned his attention in a Second Phase to the Irish Land and Labour Association's demands for the need to settle Irish labourers in the soil. His parliamentary engagement achieved the successful enactment of the unprecedented Labourers (Ireland) Act 1906 (6 Edw. 7. c. 37) (initiated by James Bryce), followed by the Labourers (Ireland) Act 1911 (1 & 2 Geo. 5. c. 19) (initiated by Augustine Birrell).

To provide small parcels of land for people to grow their own vegetables and fruits, Parliament passed the Local Government (Allotments and Land Cultivation) (Ireland) Act 1917.

Finally the Labourers (Ireland) Act 1919 (9 & 10 Geo. 5. c. 55), which all together made provisions for a programme of large scale state-funded rural social housing, in which over 40,000 labourer-owned cottages were erected on 1 acre (4,000 m^{2}) of land by local County Councils.

The Acts housed, at low annual annuities, over a quarter of a million rural labourers and their families, previously living in hovels, which thereby transformed the Irish countryside.

Local Government (Allotments and Land Cultivation) (Ireland) Act 1917 (Note: Section 2(2).)
- Act of Parliament
- Parliament of the United Kingdom
- Long title: An Act to enable Local Authorities in Ireland to provide allotments and otherwise promote the cultivation of land, and for other purposes incidental thereto.
- Citation: 7 & 8 Geo. 5. c. 30
- Territorial extent: Ireland

Dates
- Royal assent: 2 August 1917
- Commencement: 2 August 1917
- Repealed: 22 December 1927
Other legislation
Repealed by	Statute Law Revision Act 1927

Status: Repealed

Text of statute as originally enacted

== Irish Land (Provision for Sailors and Soldiers) Act 1919 ==
Irish Land (Provision for Sailors and Soldiers) Act 1919 (Note: Section 8.)
- Act of Parliament
- Parliament of the United Kingdom
- Long title: An Act to facilitate the provision of land in Ireland for men who have served in the Naval, Military, or Air Forces of the Crown in the present war, and for other purposes incidental thereto.
- Citation: 9 & 10 Geo. 5. c. 82
- Territorial extent: United Kingdom

Dates
- Royal assent: 23 December 1919
- Commencement: 23 December 1919
- Repealed: 4 November 1987 (Note: Irish Sailors and Soldiers Land Trust Act 1987 (Commencement) Order 1987 (SI 1987/1909).)
Other legislation
Amends	Sailors and Soldiers (Gifts for Land Settlement) Act 1916
Amended by	Statute Law Revision Act 1950; Statute Law Revision Act 1953; Statute Law (Repeals) Act 1969
Repealed by	Irish Sailors and Soldiers Land Trust Act 1987
Relates to	Lands Clauses Consolidation Act 1845; Agriculture and Technical Instruction (Ireland) Act 1899; Labourers (Ireland) Act 1906; Irish Land Act 1909; Small Holding Colonies Act 1916

Status: Repealed

Text of statute as originally enacted

Following the Great War, a further 5,000 houses were built in both parts of Ireland for returning soldiers, under the Irish Land (Provision for Sailors and Soldiers) Act 1919 (9 & 10 Geo. 5. c. 82) which was defined as "An Act to facilitate the provision of land in Ireland for men who have served in the Naval, Military, or Air Forces of the Crown in the present War, and for other purposes incidental thereto", and, "so far as it relates to the provision of holdings under the Land Purchase Acts, shall be construed as one with those Acts, and, so far as it relates to the provision of cottages, plots, or gardens under the Labourers (Ireland) Acts, 1883 to 1919, shall be construed as one with the last-mentioned Acts." It was effected by the Irish Soldiers' and Sailors' Land Trust, which co-operated with the new Irish Free State, mostly building small new housing estates for veterans at the edge of towns. The object of the act was to facilitate the reinstatement in civil-life of ex-servicemen and their dependents with the provision of £800,000 sterling for housing accommodation by the Local Government Board.

== Free State Land Acts ==
On the formation of the Irish Free State in 1922, the commission was reconstituted by the Land Law (Commission) Act 1923 (No. 27), which also dissolved the Congested Districts Board. The Land Act 1923 adopted many proposals for a final land settlement from decisions reached during the Irish Convention in 1918 under the chairmanship of Horace Plunkett. The convention's proposals formed the basis of the act.

The Land Commission had bought up 13 million acres (53,000 km^{2}) of farmland between 1885 and 1920 where the freehold was assigned under mortgage to tenant farmers and farm workers. The focus had been on the compulsory purchase of untenanted estates so that they could be divided into smaller units for local families, some of which proved to be "uneconomic"; this policy was applied unevenly across the country, with some large estates surviving if the owners could show that their land was being actively farmed. Provision was made for compulsory purchase of land owned by a non-Irish person until repealed in 1966.

From 1923, the amounts outstanding under earlier acts were paid to the British government as "land annuities", accruing in a Land Purchase Fund. This was fixed at £250,000 annually in 1925. In December 1925, W. T. Cosgrave lamented that there were already: "250,000 occupiers of uneconomic holdings, the holdings of such a valuation as did not permit of a decent livelihood for the owners". Despite this, his government continued to subdivide larger landholdings, primarily to gain electoral support.

The Land Act 1933 (No. 38), passed on a vote of 70–39, allowed the Minister for Finance to divert the annuities for local government projects. This was a factor in the Anglo-Irish Trade War between 1932 and 1938, and was mutually resolved by a one-off payment of £10 million to Britain in 1938. From 1932 the government argued strongly that Irish farmers should no longer be obliged for historic reasons to pay Britain for Irish land, but when Britain had passed out of the payment system it illogically still required farmers to continue to pay their annuities to the Irish government as before.

The Land Act 1965 (No. 2) was designed to stop speculative purchases of land by non-Irish persons. The Succession Act 1965 (No. 27) treated real estate owned by a deceased person as personalty for the first time.

The commission ceased acquiring land in 1983; this signified the start of the end of the commission's reform of Irish land ownership, though freehold transfers of farmland still had to be signed off by the commission into the 1990s. The commission was dissolved on 31 March 1999, by the Irish Land Commission (Dissolution) Act 1992 (No. 25), and most of the remaining liabilities and assets were transferred to the Minister for Agriculture and Food. Many relevant historical records are held by the National Archives of Ireland.

=== Ground rents ===
A "ground rent" is a nominal annual rent paid where a property is held under a long lease. Legislation has reformed ground rents alongside the agricultural land laws (see above). While most tenancy reform legislation was enacted for agricultural land, urban and suburban occupiers / tenants have been allowed to "buy out" their ground rents from landlords, and so effectively can change a long lease into a freehold interest, most recently under the Landlord and Tenant (Ground Rents) (No. 2) Act 1978 (No. 16) and the Landlord and Tenant (Ground Rents) Act 2005 (No. 7). Notably, ground rents in Castlebar, County Mayo have been withheld following the disappearance of Lord Lucan in 1974.

Paying ground rents is still considered by some to be an unresolved part of Ireland's history as a part of the United Kingdom; the Irish Government itself pays ground rents for iconic public buildings, including Government Buildings, the Four Courts, Dublin Castle and the Botanic Gardens. While the individual cost of each is relatively small, given inflation, an estimated 250,000 ground rents still exist in Ireland, with the state annually paying for example to the Duke of Leinster for some buildings. Brian Hayes, Minister of State for the Office of Public Works in 2011, stated that a referendum would be required to put the practice to an end. Residents of Hayes' own constituency continue to be issued demands for payment, with many ignoring them, though given that outstanding liabilities of ground rent hinder residents' ability to sell their homes, about 1,600 applications per annum are made to buy out ground rents every year.

== Land and Conveyancing Law Reform Act 2009 (Republic of Ireland) ==
The Land and Conveyancing Law Reform Act 2009 (No. 27) comprehensively reformed the law of conveyancing, mortgages, registration of and claims to title, rights of way and easements in the Ireland. Some little-used interests relating to feudal tenure, life interests, leases for lives and fee tails were formally abolished.

== Northern Ireland ==
Northern Ireland Land Act 1925 (Note: Section 36(1).)
- Act of Parliament
- Parliament of the United Kingdom
- Long title: An Act to amend the Law relating to the Occupation and Ownership of Land in Northern Ireland; and for other purposes relating thereto.
- Citation: 15 & 16 Geo. 5. c. 34
- Territorial extent: United Kingdom

Dates
- Royal assent: 28 May 1925
- Commencement: 28 May 1925
Other legislation
Amends	Land Law (Ireland) Act 1881; Land Law (Ireland) Act 1896; Irish Land Act 1903
Amended by	Northern Ireland Land Act 1929; Statute Law Revision Act 1950; Statute Law Revision Act 1953; National Debt Act 1958; Decimal Currency Act 1969; Land Registration Act (Northern Ireland) 1970; Northern Ireland Constitution Act 1973; Northern Ireland (Modification of Enactments—No. 1) Order 1999

Status: Amended

Text of statute as originally enacted

Revised text of statute as amended

Text of the Northern Ireland Land Act 1925 as in force today (including any amendments) within the United Kingdom, from legislation.gov.uk.

Northern Ireland Land Act 1929 (Note: Section 8(1).)
- Act of Parliament
- Parliament of the United Kingdom
- Long title: An Act to amend the Northern Ireland Land Act, 1925.
- Citation: 19 & 20 Geo. 5. c. 14
- Territorial extent: United Kingdom

Dates
- Royal assent: 27 March 1929
- Commencement: 27 March 1929
Other legislation
Amends	Northern Ireland Land Act 1925
Amended by	Northern Ireland Constitution Act 1973

Status: Amended

Text of statute as originally enacted

Revised text of statute as amended

Text of the Northern Ireland Land Act 1929 as in force today (including any amendments) within the United Kingdom, from legislation.gov.uk.

Northern Ireland Land Purchase (Winding Up) Act 1935 (Note: Section 15(1).)
- Act of Parliament
- Parliament of the United Kingdom
- Long title: An Act to make provision for the winding up of the system of land purchase in Northern Ireland established by the Land Purchase Acts and other enactments in that behalf, for the abolition of the Land Purchase Commission, Northern Ireland, and the transfer of functions exercisable under the said Acts and other enactments, and for purposes incidental to the purposes aforesaid and consequential thereon.
- Citation: 25 & 26 Geo. 5. c. 21
- Territorial extent: United Kingdom

Dates
- Royal assent: 6 June 1935
- Commencement: (Note: Section 15(2).)
Other legislation
Amends	Land Law (Ireland) Act 1881
Amended by	Northern Ireland Act 1947; Statute Law Revision Act 1950; Statute Law Revision Act 1953; Northern Ireland Constitution Act 1973; Judicature (Northern Ireland) Act 1978

Status: Amended

Text of statute as originally enacted

Revised text of statute as amended

Text of the Northern Ireland Land Purchase (Winding Up) Act 1935 as in force today (including any amendments) within the United Kingdom, from legislation.gov.uk.

The UK Parliament at Westminster passed further Land Acts for Northern Ireland after the Partition of Ireland, such as the Northern Ireland Land Act 1925 (15 & 16 Geo. 5. c. 34), the Northern Ireland Land Act 1929 (19 & 20 Geo. 5. c. 14) and the Northern Ireland Land Purchase (Winding Up) Act 1935 (25 & 26 Geo. 5. c. 21).

Land Registration Act (Northern Ireland) 1970 (Note: Section 99(1).)
- Act of Parliament
- Parliament of Northern Ireland
- Long title: An Act to revise the law relating to the registration of the title to land; to extend the compulsory registration of the title to land; to repeal and re-enact with certain amendments the law relating to the registration of statutory charges; and for matters connected therewith.
- Citation: 1970 c. 18 (N.I.)
- Territorial extent: Northern Ireland

Dates
- Royal assent: 23 June 1970
- Commencement: (Note: Section 99(3).)
Other legislation
Amended by	Building Societies Act 1986; Economic Crime and Corporate Transparency Act 2023

Status: Amended

Revised text of statute as amended

Text of the Land Registration Act (Northern Ireland) 1970 as in force today (including any amendments) within the United Kingdom, from legislation.gov.uk.

The Parliament of Northern Ireland passed the Land Registration Act (Northern Ireland) 1970 (c. 18 (N.I.)).

== See also ==
- Land reforms by country
- Landlord and Tenant Law Amendment (Ireland) Act 1860
- Assignment and Sub-letting of Land (Ireland) Act 1826
