= Land Conference =

The Land Conference was a successful conciliatory negotiation held in the Mansion House in Dublin, Ireland between 20 December 1902 and 4 January 1903. In a short period it produced a unanimously agreed report recommending an amiable solution to the long waged land war between tenant farmers and their landlords. Advocating a massive scheme of voluntary land purchase, it provided the basis for the most important land reform ever introduced by any Government of the United Kingdom of Great Britain and Ireland during the period of the Act of Union (1801–1922), the Land Purchase (Ireland) Act 1903.

Through it, the whole Irish land question underwent a revolutionary transformation whereby the entire tenantry were encouraged to purchase their holdings with advances from the imperial exchequer, provided for the express purpose of facilitating the transfer of the land from owner to occupier.

== Land War as prelude ==
There were three periods of particularly acute tension and conflict between landlord and tenant in the period 1877–1903. The first period 1877–82, a period of poor harvest, decreased demand for agricultural products and falling prices, saw the establishment of the Irish National Land League in 1879 followed by demonstrations, boycotting, no-rent campaigns, arrests, suppression and prosecutions during 1880–82. The Land Acts introduced in 1881 and 1885 alleviated certain needs, but by and large the grievances of the mass of tenant farmers went unheeded.

A second period of agitation began with rent strikes in 1885 accompanied by the Plan of Campaign during 1886 to 1892. Land Acts in 1885 and 1891 provided for limited tenant land purchase, but as the acts were cumbersome and unwieldy they were little availed of by tenants. The third period of unrest was around the turn of the century, from 1898 to 1902, when, backed by intensified campaigns for compulsory land purchase of both William O'Brien MP's United Irish League (UIL) and T. W. Russell MP's Ulster farmer's organisation in 1901-2, tenants again agitated for concessions from their landlords. There was also a growing resentment at the landlord class as enunciated by Russell, who castigated their control of land as 'systemised and legal robbery'.

The Government was involved in the Land War only to the extent of enforcing its understanding of law and order chiefly in the interest of land owners. All the acts passed advanced the rights of tenants to some extent, but by the end of the century it was clear that the existing system of landlord and tenant ought to be replaced by a system of 'tenant proprietorship'.

== Landlords take the initiative ==
When the Chief Secretary for Ireland George Wyndham introduced a Land Purchase Bill early in 1902 which fell deplorably short of the necessities of the situation, the UIL wanted no paltry compromises and entered upon a virile campaign against the rack-renters. All the elements of social convulsion were gathering strength, when on 2 September 1902 a letter appeared in the newspapers from an unknown country gentleman. Captain John Shaw-Taylor (the younger son of a Galway landlord and a nephew of Lady Gregory's) set out a proposal for a landlord-tenant conference in the following terms: "For the last two hundred years the land war has rages fiercely and continuously, bearing in its train stagnation of trade, paralysis of commercial business and enterprise and producing hatred and bitterness between various sections and classes of the community " He went on to invite a number of fellow landlords and Irish Nationalist MPs to a Conference in Dublin at which " An honest, simple suggestion will be submitted and I am confident that a settlement will be arrived at".

What marked out Shawe-Taylor's appeal was that Wyndham promptly endorsed it, and a group of moderate landlords came forward, balloted fellow-landlords, and received a mandate for negotiations. They were important because they articulated the desire of a small but highly influential group of centrist landlords who, in turn, were encouraged by the Dublin Castle administration.

They set up a Land Committee which produced four delegates to meet the tenant representatives. These were the Earl of Dunraven, the Earl of Mayo, Col. Sir Hutcheson Poë and Col. Sir Nugent Everard. It was entirely fitting that a scion of the original invader should be among those called to reverse the consequences of the Conquest. Among them, Dunraven soon emerged as a capable leader with a genuine sympathy for a settlement and an interest in Irish affairs transcending mere land questions. Dunraven and Everand were among the few landlords to win election to county councils in 1899; Everard survived on Meath County Council until 1920.

== Nationalists name their terms ==
During the summer of 1902 conciliatory advances were not entirely novel. On the Nationalist side, John Redmond MP, leader of the Irish Parliamentary Party, indicated on two occasions that he was in favour of conciliation, even if the landlords had to get better terms than they deserved from their history. After publication of the Shawe-Taylor letter which proposed O'Brien, Redmond, Timothy Harrington MP and Russell as the tenant representative, there was enough conciliation in the air to generate a scheme that would bring the parties together. Shawe-Taylor corresponded with both O'Brien and Redmond on his initial difficulty in having the landlords take up the conference idea. However, by 19 September both agreed to throw in their support. Shawe-Taylot had chosen his men well. There was now no turning back, the landlord deliberations having agreed on four delegates to meet the tenant representatives.

Dunraven and Redmond as leaders of their respective delegation drew up a scheme that would be fair to landlord and tenant alike. There was confidence that victory and new possibilities would result from such cooperation, Redmond reporting to O'Brien that Dunraven himself had further ideas as to some kind of Home Rule afterwards. O'Brien outlined his views on the terms to be discussed at the Conference in a long letter to Redmond, advising against any elaborate agenda. Dunraven's and O'Brien's views coincided, the latter outlining details of an agreement with a formula which would regulate what amounts tenants should pay in annuities and what the landlord should receive in payment, the government to pay a gap-bridging bonus to the landlord for the shortfall, O'Brien confident that a golden age of social peace was dawning.

== Swift agreement reached ==
The eight delegates finally met on 20 December 1902 with Dunraven as chairman and Shawe-Taylor as secretary, in a conference publicly hailed by Redmond as "the most significant episode in the public life of Ireland for the last century". After only six sittings, a unanimously agreed conference report proposing a vast purchase scheme along the lines framed by O'Brien, seven of the eight of the tenant's requirements were conceded outright, the eight covered by a compromise, was published 4 January 1903. The Land Conference reached an amiable solution differing from the purchase schemes and provisions of previous land acts in one essential aspect, that sale was to be irresistibly attractive to both parties. The State should supply 'any reasonable difference arising between the sum advanced by the State and ultimately repaid to it'. This contribution was to be justified by the desirability of giving the occupier a favourable start on their new career as owner'.

The report, in turn, provided the basis for the future land act. It seemed for a scant moment that both the historic land dispute had been resolved and the style of national politics had been redefined along new, conciliatory lines. The Land Conference Report was praised by O'Brien as such, not merely its commitment to legislation, but also the new form of Irish politics it embodied, O'Brien's 'conference plus business'.

The attention of Ireland was now riveted on the developments around the Conference Report, for what was to become the most revolutionary piece of legislation in Irish history, the Irish Land Act 1903. Before the Land Conference Redmond and O'Brien had preached "unity" and "conciliation". Nationalists, O'Brien foremost, believed that the destruction of landlordism could only hasten Home Rule. The calm was first ruffled by Archbishop Walsh of Dublin, who, although the Bishop's Standing Committee expressed approval of the Report, in letters to the Freeman's Journal he challenged the accuracy of certain figures. O'Brien in turn retaliated with an exchange of letters which only ended by mid-March when it became clear that the government would enact on the Land Conference proposal.

There was to be no quiet revolution in Irish national politics. The omens were initially good: on 16 February the leadership of the League blessed the conference (and the later act), as did Redmond and the Irish Parliamentary Party. But these prospects were soon to be dashed by the chief adversary of the Conference, Redmond's deputy John Dillon MP. His detestation of landlords was well known, having publicly expressed his familiar view that the best way to deal with landlords was not to confer with them, rather to make life uncomfortable for them. Dillon regarded O'Brien's enthusiasm for the Conference policy with deepening suspicion and had begun to diverge from the line taken by his friends, with consequences which in the long term were to be momentous.

== Act brings fortune and dissention ==
Wyndham introduced his long-awaited bill on 25 March. Compared with all previous attempts to solve the intractable land question, this was daring, generous and ingenious. The prices to be paid would range from 18½ years' purchase up to 24½ years' purchase on first term rents (that is, rents settled by the Land Courts under the Land Law (Ireland) Act 1881), or 21½ to 27½ years' purchase on second-term rents. The money was to be advanced by the state and repaid over 68½ years by annuities at the rate of 3¼ per cent. The landlord was to receive a 12% bonus to stimulate sales, paid for out of Irish revenues, one of some features which aroused nationalist resentment. As the bill progressed through Parliament, O'Brien became convinced that the conference method could bring other social reforms and secure unionist consent for limited self-government, developing into full Home Rule. Tim Healy MP turned from sceptics to vigorously supporting the bill's passage. He extravagantly hailed it as one of the most remarkable occurrences in his political life, and actively collaborated and discussed its provisions in private with Wyndham, the Irish Secretary.

O'Brien was very prominent in the Commons debates on the bill as his enthusiasm mounted. The deep divisions this created were initially kept in check but the opposition of Dillon, Michael Davitt, Thomas Sexton MP and his daily Freeman's Journal to the collaboration between nationalists, landlords and a Conservative Government intensified. Dillon, Redmond reported with apprehension, was very opposed to the bill. "He does not want a reconciliation with landlords – or anything less than their being driven out of Ireland." The criticisms of Sexton's nationalist daily outmatched the lesser voice of O'Brien's weekly, The Irish People. Davitt emerged as an opponent of the future Land Act, not solely because he demanded nothing less than land nationalisation, also because he regarded the terms offered to the landlords as too favourable.

By 7 May the bill had passed its second reading with a number of amendments by 443 votes to 26, a personal triumph for Wyndham. On 21 July the third reading was passed, the bill only modified in minor ways by the House of Lords and by the middle of August it had become law. Almost immediately land purchase was enormously accelerated. Prior to 1903 a total of nearly 20 million sterling had been advanced for the purchase of 2 ½ million acres. Under the Irish Land Act 1903, and the consequential Irish Land Act 1909, the position was completely transformed. When in March 1920, the Estate Commission reviewed the development since 1903 under these acts, they estimated that 83 million sterling had been advanced for 9 million acres (36,000 km^{2}) transferred, whilst a further 2 million acres (8,100 km^{2}) were pending costing 24 million sterling. By 1914, 75% of occupiers were buying out their landlords, mostly under the two acts. In all, under the pre-UK Land Acts over 316,000 tenants purchased their holdings amounting to 11,500,000 acres (47,000 km^{2}) out of a total of 20 million in the country.

It can be said, that with the Irish Land Act 1903 the state moved to subvent the process of land purchase in Ireland by means of state loans "as a healing measure". It was precisely the policy which Parnell enunciated in the 1880s.

== Conference versus confrontation ==
Although the Act resulted in vastly extended sales of entire estates – and in this regard deserves to be characterised as revolutionary, the adversary campaign led by Dillon, Davitt and Sexton which claimed it was a landlord victory, created a climax of disillusionment. Not the Act was in question but the manner in which it was won by O'Brien. The issue was – should nationalists co-operate with a minority of Irishmen whose political background was so fundamentally different from theirs? The adversaries said no, O'Brien said yes, pointing to the successful Land Conference as the precursor of further partnerships between nationalists and Unionists.

A few weeks after the Act was passed, the precarious consensus achieved by the party was shattered by John Dillon who openly aired his hostility to the Land Act and its underlying premise that it could serve the cause of reconciliation between agnostic classes and conflicting parties during a speech to his constituents at Swinford, County Mayo. O'Brien, who fervently believed in the power of conciliation and the conference approach, never forgave Dillon for his "Swinford revolt". It marked the end of a close friendship going back to the Plan of Campaign years in 1880s. Added aggravation came from Arthur Griffith who denounced the Land Conference as a landlord swindle and seized on Dillon's reaction to prove the party self-confessed incompetents.

O'Brien, who had up to then held the initiative, and saw Dillon wantonly attacking a policy which the Irish party and the UIL had approved of and which had begun to reap considerable advantages for the country at large, tried to use his influence with his party leader and conciliation colleague Redmond to crush the opposition of Dillon, Davitt and the Freeman's Journal, but could not get the chairman to act. Redmond balked fearing a rupture with Sexton, Dillon and Davitt, all respected veterans of the Land War, would cause a split and the end of unity in the party. Dillon on the other hand, financially independent, could count on the support of Davitt, of Joe Devlin MP's Belfast machine and of the Irish organisation in Britain led by T. P. O'Connor MP.

== The wider impact and fallout ==
=== Defeat for doctrine of conciliation ===
William O'Brien, distressed and marginalised by Dillon's assault, told Redmond on 4 November 1903 he was retiring from Parliament and the UIL Directory, withdrawing from public life and closing the Irish People. O'Brien refused to reconsider, despite appeals from friends and allies His resignation was a very serious blow for the party at home and abroad. Membership lapsed, many UIL branches became extinct. O'Brien embarked on a lengthy career of independent opposition to the Parliamentary party and although he briefly returned, together with Healy, in January 1908 in the interest of unity and to test the strategy of conciliation again, disappointment remained his lot. Events had drawn the once estranged Healy and O'Brien closer together, both now sharing a common foe, the party. Purged from it again by the Devlin instigated Baton Convention O'Brien formed a new political organisation in 1909, the All-for-Ireland League, to defy the party and further the cause of national conciliation.

When in 1917 Lloyd George and Redmond called the Irish Convention in an attempt to win over Ulster for a Home Rule settlement, O'Brien declined an invitation to attend on the grounds that it could not succeed with a hundred and one delegates. His proposal to reduce the numbers to a dozen genuinely representative Irishmen from North and South, on the lines of the Land Conference, was not accepted, the Convention consequently ending as he predicted in disagreement.

=== Devolution Crisis of 1904–5 ===
The original centrist supporters of the Land Conference turned themselves into the Irish Reform Association, led by Dunraven. They contemplated the further development of O'Brien's policy of conciliation by providing a platform to explore the possibility of limited devolved government for Ireland, heralding hopes for O'Brien, that Ireland had somehow entered a new era in which 'conference plus business' could replace agitation and parliamentary tactics as a primary strategy for achieving national goals.

With the involvement of Wyndham, the reformists produced two reports in August–September 1904 on a scheme of 'devolution'—that is, for granting to Ireland limited powers of local self-government. It became known that the Under-Secretary for Ireland, Sir Anthony MacDonnell, a Mayo Catholic originally appointed by Wyndham, had also been involved in the plan. In Ulster Unionist eyes this added particular sinister significance to the whole affair, scented a political conspiracy and were outraged that a permanent official should dare to tamper with the sacred British connection. MacDonnell claimed he had written to his superior Wyndham informing him, who failed to take particular notice of the letter. When in March 1905 Unionists launched their attack and Ulster resentment became overwhelming, Wyndham, by now a broken man, was forced to retire from office.

Nationalist leaders taken by surprise by the Association's proposals, reacted ambiguously, Redmond at first greeted the devolution scheme, then sided with Dillon who was vehemently against it, regarding the Irish party as the only standard bearer of self-government. Anything less than the fulfilment of the full demand for self-government was dangerous, because accepting less might postpone true self-government indefinitely. Instead the two leaders bent their energies on sounding out where the Liberals stood on the Home Rule issue in the forthcoming general election.

The Dunraven group were atypical of their cast, but for a time combined with O'Brien's sense of nationalism and Healy's opportunism, produced with the Land Conference—one of the most sustained and extensive attempts at unionist-nationalist co-operation in the twentieth century.

On the other hand, the Dillonite dogma of hostility towards any form of reconciliation or conference between agnostic classes and conflicting parties, that is, towards any collaboration with the hereditary enemy at any level, precipitated into subsequent events on the political stage in Ireland up to the end of the century.
