= United Irish League =

Former nationalist political party in Ireland

- Leader: William O'Brien (Jan 1898 – Dec 1900); John Redmond (Dec 1900 – Mar 1918); Joseph Devlin (Mar 1918–1920s)
- Founder: William O'Brien
- Founded: 23 January 1898; 128 years ago
- Dissolved: 1920s
- Ideology: Land reform Political reform Irish Home Rule
- National affiliation: None (1898–1901); IPP (1901–1918)

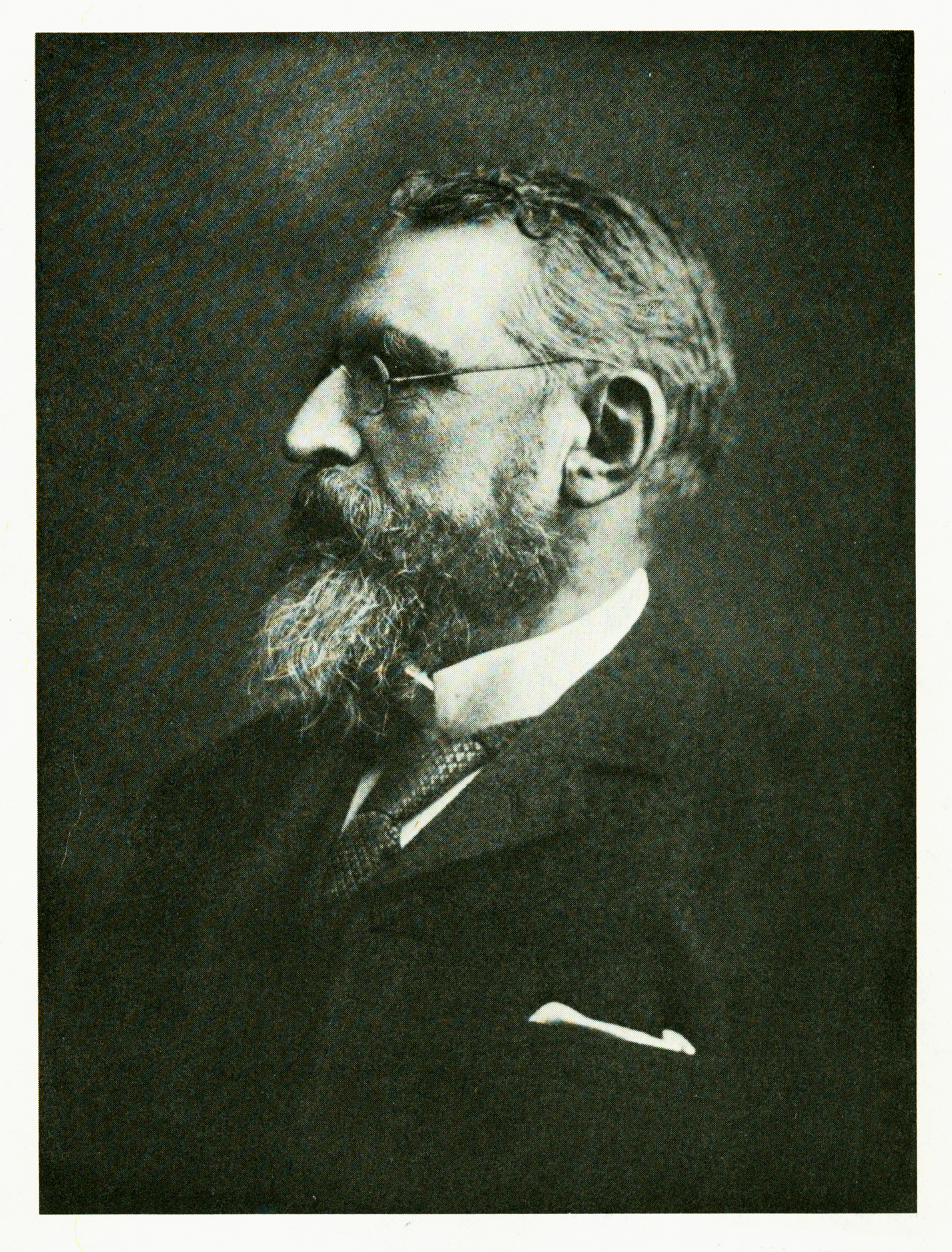
William O'Brien, founder of the United Irish League.

The United Irish League (UIL) was a nationalist political party in Ireland, launched 23 January 1898 with the motto "The Land for the People". Its objective to be achieved through agrarian agitation and land reform, compelling larger grazier farmers to surrender their lands for redistribution among the small tenant farmers. Founded and initiated at Westport, County Mayo by William O'Brien, it was supported by Michael Davitt MP, John Dillon MP, who worded its constitution, Timothy Harrington MP, John O'Connor Power MP and the Catholic clergy of the district. By 1900 it had expanded to be represented by 462 branches in twenty-five counties.

== Background ==
In 1895 William O'Brien retired from Parliament and the Irish Parliamentary Party (IPP) in the wake of the Parnell split, by which the party became fragmented into three separate networks of local organisation—the Parnellite Irish National League, the Dillionite anti-Parnellite Irish National Federation and the Healyite Peoples Right's Association. O'Brien had become disillusioned with the internal party quarrels and its failure to rouse the people to a new sense of involvement with national goals. After O'Brien had withdrawn to the West of Ireland he experienced at first hand in his Mayo exile the plight of the peasant tenant farmers and landless labourers, their distressed hardship trying to eke out an existence in its rocky landscape. In contrast, the grazier ranches on the rich plains of counties Mayo, Roscommon and Galway were in the hands of local town shopkeepers, retired policemen, and other middle-class Irish elements. They were, according to O'Brien, the real infernal evils, the so-called grasslands-grabbers, from whom the small tenant farmers were obliged to rent land for their needs. O'Brien saw the necessity to tackle the owners of these grazing ranches. He wanted to have the lands redistributed, a new idea at the time.

The land agitations during the 1880s saw the introduction of the Purchase of Land (Ireland) Act 1885, also known as the Ashbourne Act, which helped to eliminate the old cry of "land-grabbers" but since the 1890s the cry was supplemented by "grass-grabbers". O'Brien thus began to take the first steps in his new campaign of agrarian agitation that would ultimately establish peasant proprietorship. This prompted him to call for the introduction of a Land Bill with a provision for the compulsory purchase of untenanted grazier-ranches for distribution among tenants. The failure of the Conservative Government to provide for compulsory purchase under Balfour's 1891 Land Act, convinced O'Brien that something more than Parliamentary oratory was needed to encourage official circles to attend to the needs of the people.

== Objectives ==
The decline in population since the Great Famine had been accompanied by the conversion of previously cultivated land into large grazing ranches, so that in many areas most of the local population was still crowded on tiny, uneconomical holdings within sight of open, untilled fields. At the very place in Westport where in 1879 Parnell once launched the Irish Land League, and in response to the near-famine of 1897–98, O'Brien established a new organisation, the United Irish League (UIL) in January 1898 under the banner of "The Land for the People". The League had as its prime declared object the breaking up of the large grassland farmers, by compelling them to surrender their lands voluntarily to the Congested Districts Board, established by Balfour in 1891, for redistribution among the tenants of smaller agricultural holdings. It was largely welcomed even among some of the clergy while the authorities on the other hand kept the new movement under close observation. Actually, O'Brien put more life into the country in the first six months of the League than the Nationalist party had aroused in years, after widespread agrarian agitation recommenced in 1898.

The clergy in the district around Westport and Newport, County Mayo promoted the League with considerable zeal, one parish priest called for a branch to hunt the grabbers and Scottish graziers out of the country. Elsewhere the clergy were in no hurry to sanction the League's agitation. Except for Archbishop McEvilly of Tuam, who expressed sympathy for the goals of its agitation. By September 1899 the League had spread to the extent that all six Connacht bishops expressed approval of attempts "to create peasant proprietorship with enlarged holdings in the west of Ireland". The Tuam provincial hierarchy's accommodation of the League up to 1900 reflected predominantly the genuine congruence of their social ideals with the stated aims of the movement.

The League was equally and explicitly designed to reconcile the various parliamentary fragments by bringing them together in a new grass roots organisation around a programme of agrarian agitation, political reform, settlement of the Irish land question and pursuit of Irish Home Rule. William O'Brien was the prime mover, and the difficulty of the project can be gauged from the fact that the parliamentary leaders had very different opinions on the land question. Dillon regarded the unresolved land issue as an essential motor for the nationalist home rule movement. O'Brien championed the smallholders against the large graziers while Davitt, whose original idea had been state ownership and agrarian socialism, was not particularly enamoured by peasant proprietorship.

Though O'Brien claimed that his organisation had no political objective, he became intrinsically aware that to further their cause the three split factions of the IPP needed to be re-united. He strongly believed that only agitational politics combined with constitutional pressures, rather than physical force, were the best means of achieving its goals. It was O'Brien's and Davitt's hope that reunion could be forced on the party from the outside, by organising the country and transforming the Irish representation in Parliament through the election of "good men". Dillon became ambivalent about the new association, believing that it would lead to confrontation with the government and endanger the alliance with the Liberals. This marked the first significant strain in the O'Brien-Dillon relationship.

== Expansion ==
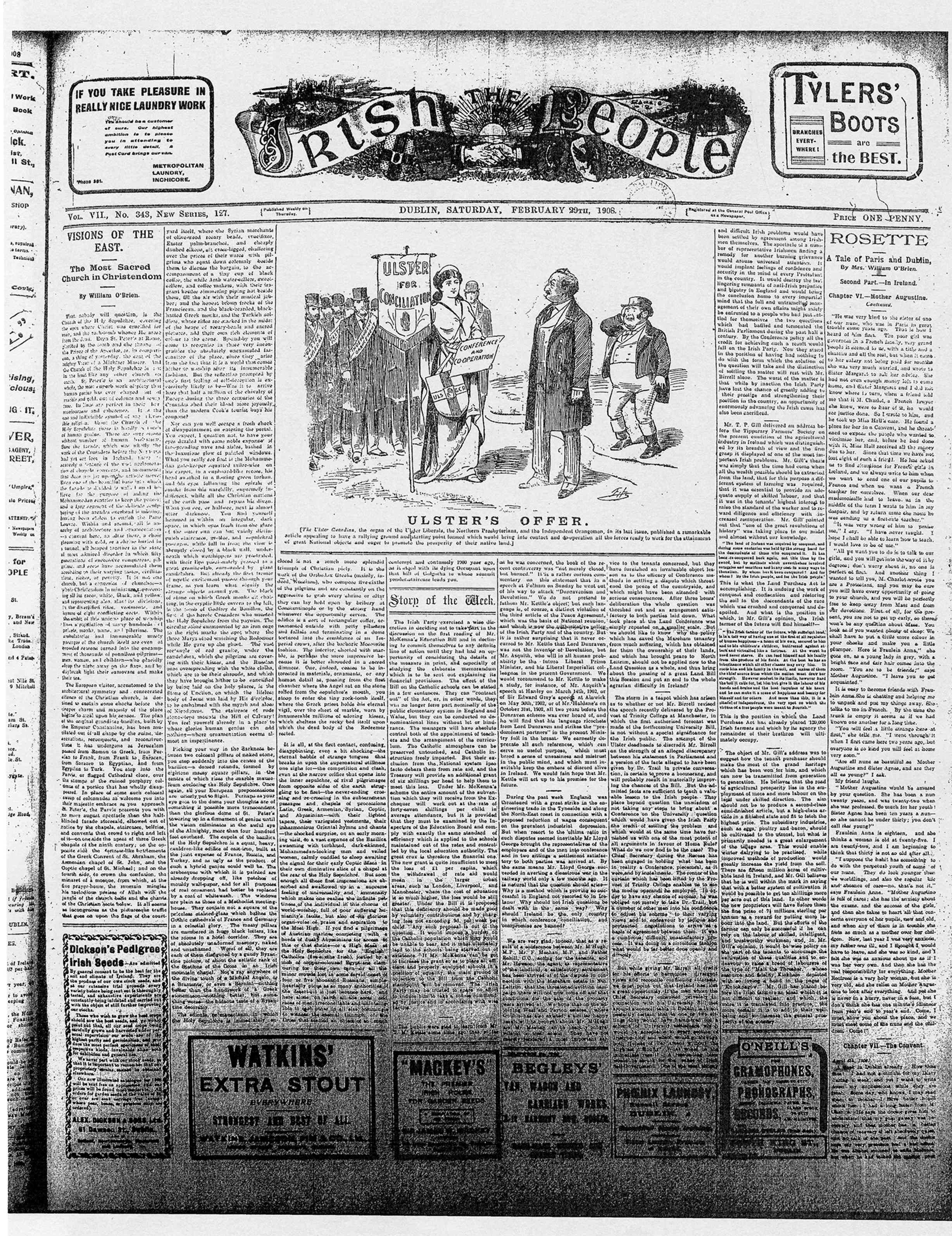
The Irish People (29 February 1908), the official newspaper of the UIL

Organised by John O'Donnell MP as its general secretary the UIL performed extremely well and threatened the position of the divided Irish Parliamentary Party. As a consequence, it quickly gained popular support among tenant farmer, its branches sweeping over most of the country, dictating to the demoralised Irish party leaders the terms for reconstruction, not only of the party but the nationalist movement in Ireland. The UIL platform included commitments to such themes as language revival and industrial development. The movement was backed by O'Brien's new newspaper The Irish People (Sept. 1899 – Nov. 1903). In it he declared that the new League was the people's organisation and that the people, and not the politicians, should be its base. Its organisation included an elaborate representative structure linked to a National Directory. This threat to the divided factions of the IPP began a reunification among MPs, led from above, to counter the UIL threat growing up from below.

The League immediately took up the issue of land redistribution, which the Irish Land League had campaigned on two decades earlier, but had been sidelined after the IPP split into the declining Irish National League and the Irish National Federation. The League's first electoral target was the county council elections under the new revolutionary Local Government (Ireland) Act 1898. The Act broke the power of the landlord ascendancy dominated "Grand Juries", for the first time passing absolute democratic control of local affairs into the hands of the people through elected Local County Councils. Next to full Home Rule a no more remarkable concession to popular rights and economic reconstruction.

The creation of the new councils had a significant effect on Ireland as it allowed local people to take decisions affecting themselves. The county and the sub-county District Councils created a political platform for proponents of Irish Home Rule, displacing Unionist influence in many areas. The enfranchisement of local electors allowed the development of a new political class, creating a significant body of experienced politicians who would enter national politics in Ireland in the 1920s, and increase the stability of the transitions to the parliaments of the Irish Free State.

In the first Irish local elections the UIL was able to gain control of Mayo and Sligo county councils.

The first local government elections under the Act were held in the spring of 1899 when the Leagues' candidates swept the field and Nationalist county and district councillors began to conduct the local administrative functions hitherto performed by landlord-dominated grand-juries. In some areas such as county Cork, where long standing trade union and labour traditions existed, the electorate tended to adhere to representatives of their allegiances. The depth of support for labour was particularly displayed in Mid-Cork, no doubt due to the growth of another organisation, the Irish Land and Labour Association (ILLA), assiduously cultivated by D. D. Sheehan the then editor of the Skibbereen based newspaper, The Southern Star, who assured that UIL and ILLA branch reports were given weekly press coverage, crucial for the expansion and growth of the UIL in Cork. The existence of these two organisations, the UIL centred on popular broad-nationalism, the ILLA based on 'labour nationalism' at first apparently corroborative of one another, would within a decade ultimately lead to self-destructive class-tensions, schisms and divisions.

The UIL tactic at the time of setting the have-nots against the haves naturally appealed to the self-interest of the simpler peasants and was the main reason for the rapid spread of the movement. By April 1900 the League's listing showed 462 branches, representing between 60,000 and 80,000 members in twenty five counties. Within two years O'Brien's UIL was by far the largest organisation in the country, comprising 1150 branches and 84,355 members.

== Party re-united ==
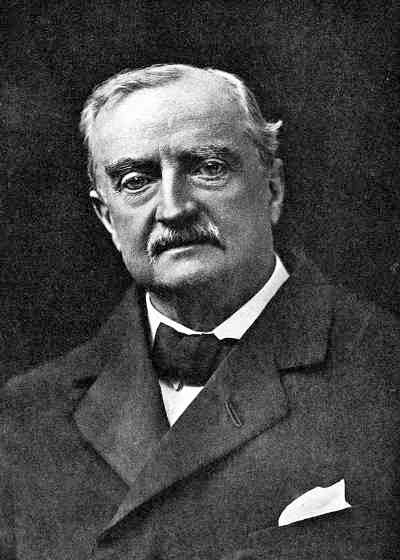
John Redmond MP, first leader of the United Irish League.

Around 1900 O'Brien, an unbending social reformer and agrarian agitator, was the most influential and powerful figure within the nationalist movement, although not formally its leader. The period was marked by considerable political development in which Davitt had been of great help during the crucial years of the League's existence, but in February, worn out and ill, he left for abroad. The settlement of the party leadership question now focused on the two most important men in Irish politics, O'Brien and Redmond. The initiative seemed to lie with O'Brien, yet Redmond had the prestige of being the Irish party leader. O'Brien was not in the true sense a politician, he possessed great popular gifts, but lacked that will to power which is the hallmark of the politician.

The result of the rapid growth of his UIL as a national organisation in achieving unity through organised popular opinion, was to effect a quick defensive re-union of the discredited IPP factions on 6 February in London under the unanimously agreed leadership of John Redmond MP, largely fearing O'Brien's return to the political field. The National League and the Irish National Federation, representing the two wings of the IPP, both merged with the UIL, which actually became accepted by the parliamentarians as the main support organisation of the parliamentary nationalists. The UIL resembled the old INL, however, in its organisers; many of them were old INL cadre whom O'Brien had recruited for a repeat performance, and it thrived in those areas where land-hungry men were particularly dominant.

The League organisers worked furiously during the months following the reunion to spread the UIL organisation into the eastern and southern parts of the country, the sharp rise during 1900 probably reflected the absorption of old National League and National Federation branches, the new organisation possessing a dynamism which had long been lost by the older bodies. The ill-feeling between the League and many clergymen transcended the political conflicts within the Irish party. The dominance of the Church in Irish rural life made almost inevitable a sense of frustration on the part of young men of ambition among the lower classes. A generation earlier such men had gravitated into pathetic secret protest movement. Now they found a place in the United Irish League.

One crucial problem had yet to be faced – the question of who should be president of the League. O'Brien, now at the pinnacle of national popularity, had created the League primarily to promote land purchase through vigorous agitation. This had been crippled earlier by Parnell in the National League. To avoid this in the future he saw the only way was by retaining control of the UIL through individuals who were agrarian agitators. A National Convention of the League was called and held in Dublin on 19 and 20 June 1900. It registered the triumph of the League as the national organisation with elaborate rules and a constitution drawn up by O'Brien. Redmond was elected chairman. He himself had no doubt as to the future action to be taken. Redmond intended to capture O'Brien's organisation and subordinate it to party Parliamentarian interests. He assumed the role of president in December. Within two years he and Dillon were to tactically adjunct the UIL under the wing of the IPP, manoeuvring it out of O'Brien's control.

In the September general election. O'Brien swept back to Parliament again for his old Cork constituency as the only begetter of the League and as a senior member of the inner circle of party managers. He could feel proud of his achievement after the reunited party fought its first election on the program of the United Irish League. The unity disturbed O'Brien however as it resulted in most of the ineffective party candidates being re-elected, preventing the UIL Directory from using its power in the pre-selection of candidates. The task facing the united Irish Party's new leader Redmond was now to create a unified political organisation, effectively grounded in the realities of Irish society. By 1901 revolutionary nationalism was moribund, though it was, of course, to undergo a miraculous recovery.

== Renewed agitation ==
Throughout the early months of 1901 agitation was limited, merely thirty-five cases of boycotting reported, due to O'Brien's weak health and Davitt being in America for most of the year. Despite this the Nationalists felt the old sting of League meetings being outlawed, the traditional reaction of the Administration to the least sign of popular unrest. In August 1901 the UIL reached nearly 100,000 members, when its Directory issued a resolution calling for active agitation throughout Ireland. O'Brien now at the height of his prestige, dominated the UIL machine and in a vigorous speech on 15 September called for "a great national strike against ranching and grabbing" as its winter program. What he wanted was boycotting and the filling of Irish jails. Dillon also made several fiery speeches against the government, and to tenants encouraging them to demand rent reduction and "for the purpose of driving every landlord out of the country".

With the National Convention in January 1902 claiming 1230 branches, the scene was thus set for a clash between a strong government, which was in no mood to allow an Irish land war to deflect it from its own constructive ideas, and a League pledged to attack landlordism, turning more and more to the traditional weapons of boycott and outrage. The attitude of the Dublin Castle administration hardened to such a degree that O'Brien moved a parliamentary amendment in January 1901 condemning a resort to the methods of Arthur Balfour. A steady stream of proclamations and arrests continued so that between 1901 and 1902 among others, thirteen Irish MPs were imprisoned under the Crimes Act and by the Spring of 1902 the counties of Cavan, Clare, Cork, Leitrim, Mayo, Roscommon, Sligo, Tipperary and Waterford were proclaimed to fall under the Act.

The UIL agitation focused attention on the fact that many families lived on patches of land too small to provide a decent livelihood even without rent. Agitation by tenant farmers continued to press for compulsory land purchase, but the four years of almost ceaseless activity that O'Brien put into the League had not brought the benefits for the tenants he had hoped for, apart from giving the Parliamentary party a new lease of life. Nevertheless, the Chief Secretary for Ireland Wyndham came to recognise the dire situation of the starved population of the west of Ireland. The existence of the United Irish League, the conversion of the Ulster Protestant tenant leader T. W. Russell to compulsory land purchase, O'Brien whipping up enthusiasm for his winter program of boycotting and agitation together with the cost of maintaining a huge police force to quell agrarian unrest, influenced Wyndham to recognise that the time had come to construct a Land Bill for Ireland.

== Achievement ==
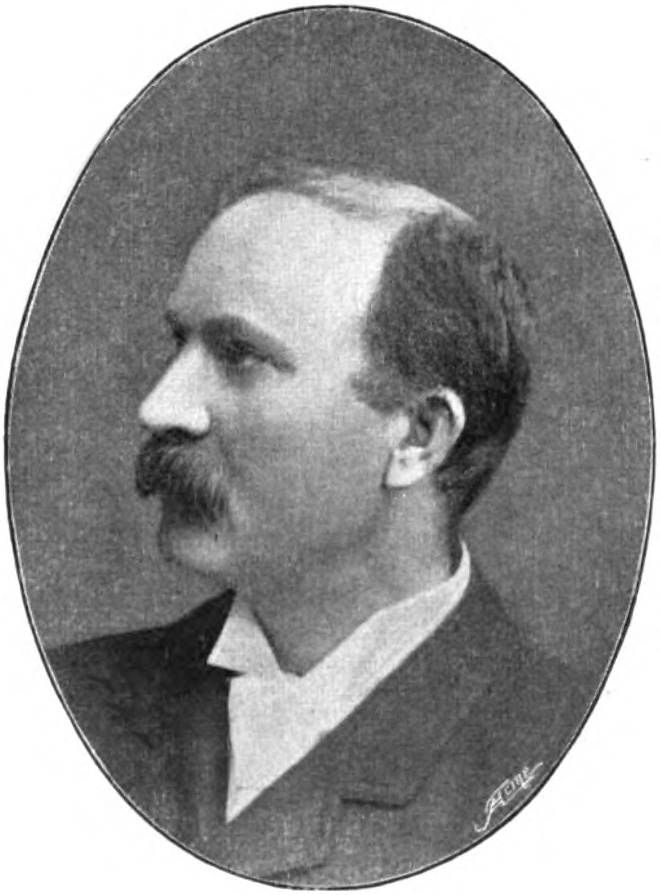
Timothy Harrington, MP for the League and tenant farmers' representative.

Balfour gave Wyndham the go-ahead to prepare for a Land Purchase Bill early in 1902, which when introduced in spring turned out to be a half-hearted abortive Bill, its terms, as urged by O'Brien, rejected by the party, so that the measure was withdrawn. There then arose one of the most striking and richly complex initiatives in the entire political history of modern Ireland. In June a landlord of moderate views, Lindsay Talbot Crosbie, wrote to the press calling for an agreed settlement between representatives of the proprietor and tenant interests. On 3 September a similar letter was published by another Galway landlord, Captain John Shawe-Taylor setting out proposals for a landlord-tenant conference. They were important because they articulated the desires of a small but influential group of moderate landlords, who, encouraged by the Administration in Dublin Castle, heralded an era of landlord-tenant rapprochement in Ireland. What saved Taylor's letter from being branded, as Crosbie's scheme was by O'Brien's Irish People, as "a stale and rotten red-herring across the path of the National movement" was its endorsement by the Chief Secretary Wyndham, who grasped the chance to salvage his Land Bill for reintroduction on terms agreed to in advance by both interested parties.

When letters of approval by Redmond and O'Brien were published in response by the press at the end of September there was no turning back. It resulted in Wyndham calling for a Land Conference to strive for a settlement by mutual agreement between landlord and tenant. It was to be among four landlord delegates to be led by Lord Dunraven on the one hand and William O'Brien MP, John Redmond MP, Timothy Harrington MP and Ulster's T. W. Russell MP representing tenant farmers on the other hand. Thus after considerable internal deliberations on both sides, the eight delegates met in Dublin on 20 December 1902 in a conference publicly hailed by Redmond as "the most significant episode in the public life of Ireland for the last century". After only six sittings, the conference report as framed by O'Brien was published on 4 January 1903, making eighteen recommendations. The report was received favourably by people holding most shades of public opinion.

After O'Brien and Redmond had met the head of the Civil Service in Dublin Castle, Sir Anthony MacDonnell, for informal talks on 6 February, the National Directory and the Parliamentary party gave approval to the Land Conference terms on 16 February. The bill to achieve social reconciliation in Ireland was finally introduced by Wyndham on 25 March 1903. The Irish Landowners' Convention which met in April acclaimed the bill as "by far the largest and most liberal measure ever offered to landlords and tenants by any Government in any country". A League Convention on 16 April saw 3,000 Nationalist supporters applaud the bill and O'Brien's resolution which "pledged the Irish nation ... to the vital principle of the policy of national reconciliation". He followed this by orchestrating the greatest and widest piece of social legislation Ireland had yet seen, the Land (Purchase) Act 1903 through Parliament. The Act provided generous bonus-subsidy terms to landowners on sale, the Irish Land Commission overseeing the new landowner's low interest annuities. O'Brien saw his achievement as having guided the official nationalist movement into endorsement of a new policy of "conference plus business" and of having set in motion events of decisive importance in reversing the consequences of centuries of alien domination. In the period 1903 to 1909 over 200,000 peasants became owners of their holdings under the Act. There is no reason to doubt O'Brien's sincerity in viewing the settlement of the land question as the first step in the attainment of Home Rule. Unfortunately few others would have the same outlook, for which he was yet to suffer.

== Estrangement ==
The passing of the Land Act in August 1903 precipitated a full-scale attack on O'Brien and the Act. The conciliatory approach and achievement in solving the land question aggravated Dillon who generally detested any negotiations with landlords. Together with Thomas Sexton and his Irish party's Freeman's Journal, Dillon denounced the legislation and the "doctrine of conciliation". This divergence, was in a few short weeks to turn the two old and once intimate friends into mortal enemies. Davitt condemned both peasant land proprietorship and that land was being purchased rather than confiscated from the landlords. O'Brien requested from his conciliatory friend Redmond that they be disciplined, which to O'Brien's consternation he refused to do, fearing a renewed party split.

Seeing himself thus alienated from the party O'Brien informed Redmond on 4 November 1903 that he was resigning from Parliament, leaving the UIL Directory, ceasing publication of his newspaper, The Irish People and withdrawing from public life. Despite appeals from friends and allies he refused to reconsider. O'Brien's resignation was a very serious matter for the party, throwing it into a state disarray not experienced since the Parnell crisis in 1890. It had repercussions at home and abroad. Laurence Ginnell of the central office reported 22 lapsed divisional bodies by December, 489 lapsed branches by the spring of 1904. The League was wholly dead in the west and in Dublin. Particularly younger men turned from any support whatever for the parliamentary movement. Davitt reported that it was also virtually dead in United States. The League continued to decline nationwide over the next years seriously affecting the funding of both the party and the League.

At the November 1904 National Convention, the General Secretary of the League, O'Brien's loyal John O'Donnell MP, was replaced by Dillon's close protégé and Belfast ally Joseph Devlin a young MP of remarkable political ability who in time gained complete control and leadership of the entire party organisation. It deprived O'Brien of all authority. Devlin was devoted to Dillon, who had helped him greatly in his rise to eminence, and Dillon in his turn had come to heavily rely on him, not only for control of the United Irish League and the Catholic organisation, the Ancient Order of Hibernians (AOH), but also because he was the outstanding representative of Ulster Nationalism.

O'Brien had always been gravely disturbed by the Irish Parliamentary Party's involvement with "that sinister sectarian secret society", the Ancient Order of Hibernians, often known as the Molly Maguires, or the Mollies – what he called "the most damnable fact in the history of this country", and was bitterly resentful and unsparing in his attacks upon it. AOH members represented Catholic-nationalism of a Ribbon tradition, their Ulster Protestant counterpart the Orange Order. Joseph Devlin, the AOH Grandmaster had attached himself to the Dillonite section of the Irish Party, was now additionally General Secretary of O'Brien's adopted UIL. Devlin was already known as "the real Chief Secretary of Ireland", his AOH spreading successfully and eventually saturating the entire island. Even in Dublin the AOH could draw large crowds and stage impressive demonstrations. In 1907, Devlin was able to assure John Redmond, the Irish Party leader, that a planned meeting of the UIL would be well attended because he would be able to get more than 400 AOH delegates to fill the hall.

== Paths divide ==
From the founding of the UIL, O'Brien held the view that Ireland's problems were caused by the manoeuvrings of the parliamentary politicians who were out of touch with popular opinion. Under the new arrangements after 1900, O'Brien proclaimed that the party should be subordinated to the League, which represented the true feeling of the country. But what in fact happened was that party members soon dominated the councils of the League and its administrative machinery. Redmond never attempted to hide the necessity for the party to be dominant in policy-making. Once O'Brien began to campaign against party policy, he was treated as a "factionist". In 1900 the leadership of the UIL had consisted of O'Brien and Dillon. In 1905, it consisted of Redmond, Dillon, and to a lesser extent, Joseph Devlin and T. P. O'Connor. O'Brien, by refusing to play the game according to the unwritten rules, forfeited his place in the leadership of the League.

O'Brien subsequently became involved with the Irish Reform Association 1904–1905, then turned to and allied with D. D. Sheehan and his Irish Land and Labour Association, which became his new platform for renewed political activity. In addition O'Brien supported both the 1904 devolution scheme and the 1907 Irish Council Bill, a bill rejected by the UIL, as a step in the right direction, or "Home Rule by instalments". These involvements inflamed the Dillonite section of the IPP to the extent that they were determined to destroy both O'Brien and Sheehan "before they poison the whole country" and published regular denunciations of their conciliatory policies in the IPP's Freeman's Journal. By 1907, there were seven MPs outside the parliamentary party. Proposals to reunite the party were made by Redmond and a meeting summoned for the Mansion House, Dublin, in April 1908. In the interest of unity, O'Brien and others rejoined the party, though a year later O'Brien left it for good. This time he was hounded out by Devlin's Molly Maguire baton troops, a wing of the Hibernian Order, on the occasion of the rigged Dublin National Convention in February 1909, called the "Baton Convention", in a dispute over the financial arrangements for the next stage of the 1909 Land Purchase Act. As a consequence, O'Brien next founded his new political movement, the All-for-Ireland League, which returned eight independent MPs in the December 1910 general elections.

The United Irish League remained politically active as Devlin's support organisation for the Parliamentary party, becoming largely infiltrated by members of the Ancient Order of Hibernians, up until the rise of Sinn Féin after the outbreak of World War I in 1914. From 1918, the UIL was restricted to Northern Ireland; it was defunct by the mid-1920s.
