= Landlord and Tenant (Ireland) Act 1870 =

Act of the Parliament of the United Kingdom

Landlord and Tenant (Ireland) Act 1870 (Note: Section 72.)
- Act of Parliament
- Parliament of the United Kingdom
- Long title: An Act to amend the Law relating to the Occupation and Ownership of Land in Ireland.
- Citation: 33 & 34 Vict. c. 46
- Territorial extent: Ireland (Note: Section 73.)

Dates
- Royal assent: 1 August 1870
- Commencement: 1 August 1870 (Note: The Acts of Parliament (Commencement) Act 1793.)
- Repealed: 10 January 2000 (Note: The Property (1997 Order) (Commencement No. 2) Order (Northern Ireland) 1999 (SI 1999/461).)
Other legislation
Amended by	Landlord and Tenant (Ireland) Act 1871; Landlord and Tenant (Ireland) Act 1872; Notices to Quit (Ireland) Act 1876; Land Law (Ireland) Act 1881; Statute Law Revision Act 1883; Land Law (Ireland) Act 1887; Statute Law Revision (No. 2) Act 1893; Irish Land Act 1903; Statute Law Revision Act 1950; Statute Law Revision (Northern Ireland) Act 1980
Repealed by	Property (Northern Ireland) Order 1997

Status: Repealed

Text of statute as originally enacted

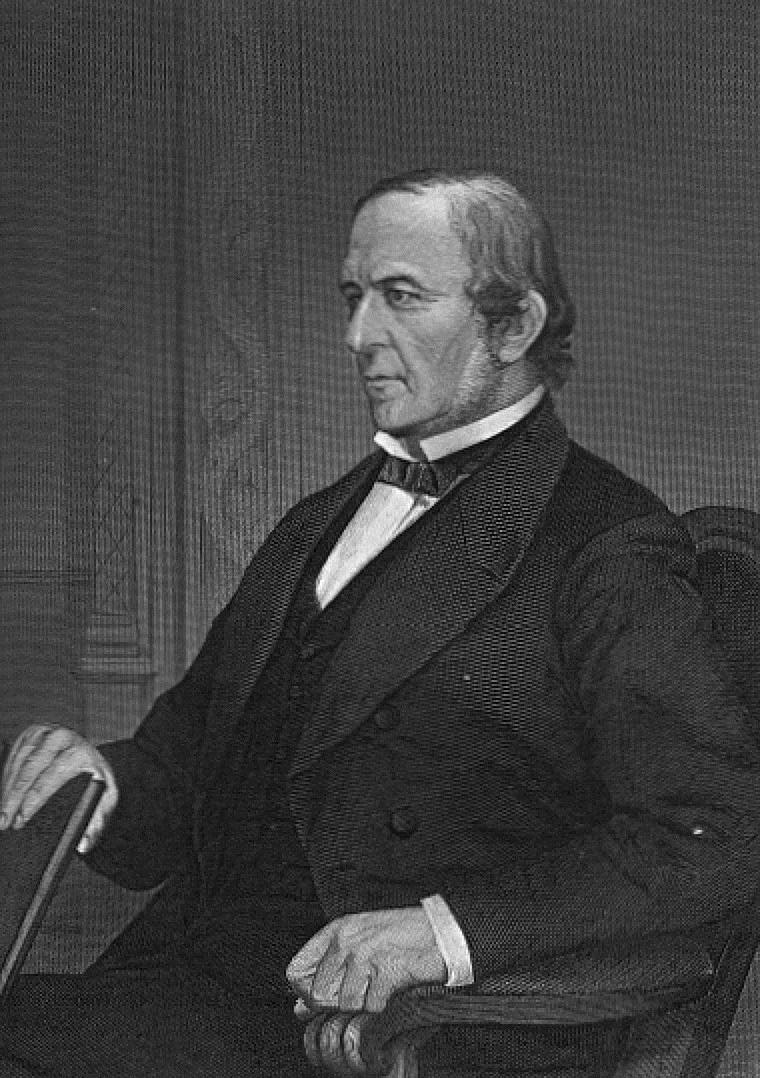
W. E. Gladstone

The Landlord and Tenant (Ireland) Act 1870 (33 & 34 Vict. c. 46) was an act of the Parliament of the United Kingdom in 1870.

== Background ==
Between the Acts of Union 1800 and the year 1870, Parliament had passed many acts dealing with Irish land, but every one of them had been in the interest of the landlord against the tenant. The Incumbered Estates (Ireland) Act 1849 (12 & 13 Vict. c. 77) had led to a new class of speculators as landlords in Ireland. Their first priority was raising tenants' rents to increase their income, and they were generally considered worse than the old landlords. A report on landlord-tenant relations written by poor law inspectors in 1869 for the Chief Secretary for Ireland drew attention to the hardships inflicted on tenants under the new landlords.

The Liberal Party under the leadership of William Ewart Gladstone had been elected in 1868 promising to bring justice for Ireland, including land reform. The President of the Board of Trade, John Bright, believed that the solution to Irish land question was to transform the tenants into owners. He wrote to Gladstone on 21 May 1869:

When the Irish church question is out of the way, we shall find all Ireland, north and south alike, united in demanding something on the land question much broader than anything hitherto offered or proposed in compensation bills. If the question is to go on without any real remedy for the grievance, the condition of Ireland in this particular will become worse, and the measures far beyond anything I now contemplate will be necessary. I am most anxious to meet the evil before it is too great for control, and my plan will meet it without wrong to any man.

Gladstone replied, doubting to the wisdom of the government embarking on a very large involvement in Irish land, purchasing estates from landlords to resell them to the tenants. He believed that economic laws might afterwards return Irish land again into fewer hands. He added: "Your plan, if adopted in full, could only extend to a small proportion of the two or three hundred millions worth of land in Ireland; and I do not well see how the unprotected tenants of the land in general would take essential benefit from the purchase and owning of land by a few of their fortunate brethren".

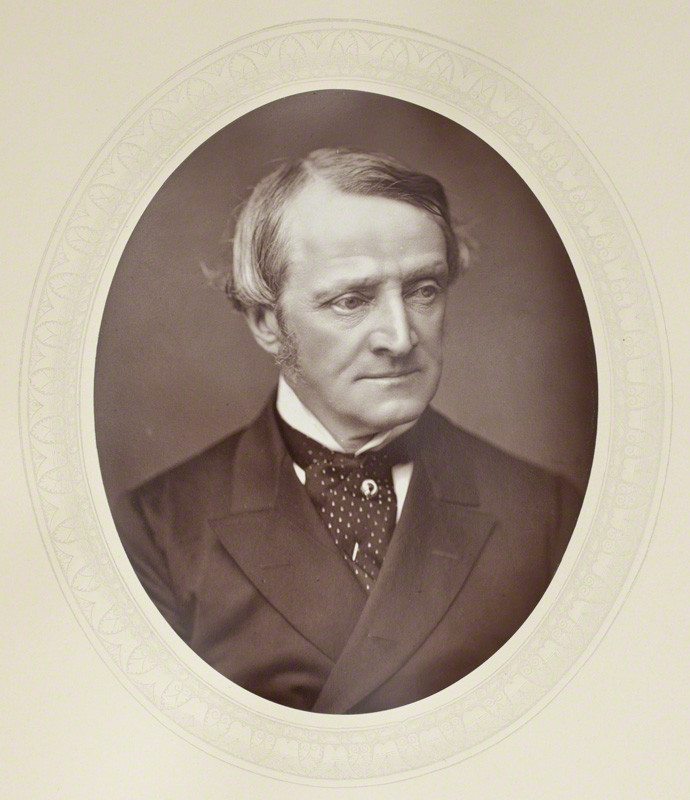
Chichester Parkinson-Fortescue

From September 1869 Gladstone was busily engaged in investigating landlord-tenant relations in Ireland and also elsewhere in Europe to devise a scheme to regulate landlord-tenant relations. The Chief Secretary, Chichester Parkinson-Fortescue, suggested in November that the Ulster custom of security of tenure for tenants should be protected by law and that a tenant not enjoying the protection of this custom should be entitled to compensation from the landlord if they were evicted.

For the next three months Gladstone went to work on modifying Parkinson-Fortescue's plan. He wrote to the Duke of Argyll on 5 December: "For the last three months I have worked daily, I think, upon the question, and so I shall continue to do. The literature of it is large, larger than I can master; but I feel the benefit of continued reading upon it. We have before us a crisis, and a great crisis, for us all, to put it on no higher ground, and a great honour or a great disgrace. As I do not mean to fail through want of perseverance, so neither will I wilfully err through precipitancy, or through want of care and desire at least to meet all apprehensions which are warranted by even the show of reason". In a letter to Lord Granville on 15 January 1870, Gladstone claimed: "To this great country the state of Ireland after seven hundred years of our tutelage is in my opinion so long as it continues, an intolerable disgrace, and a danger so absolutely transcending all others, that I call it the only real danger of the noble empire of the Queen".

On 15 February 1870 he laid the bill before the House of Commons. The second reading of the bill was passed by 442 votes to 11, the opposition consisting of eight Irish MPs who did not think it went far enough and three English Conservatives. The Conservative leader Benjamin Disraeli moved an amendment intended to limit compensation to unexhausted improvements by tenants and the government majority against it fell to 76. When the Liberal MP William Fowler moved an amendment the government majority against it was only 32. The debate in the Commons lasted over three and a half months and the third reading was passed without division; in the House of Lords it was read a second time without division. On 1 August the bill received royal assent.

== Provisions ==
The Ulster Custom or any similar custom prevailing elsewhere was given the force of law where it existed.

Tenants not enjoying that protection (the vast majority) gained increased security by compensation for improvements made to a farm if they surrendered their lease (they had previously been accredited to the landlord, hence no incentive to the tenant) and compensation for 'disturbance', damages, for tenants evicted for causes other than non-payment of rent.

The 'John Bright Clauses', which Gladstone accepted reluctantly, allowed tenants to borrow from the government two thirds of the cost of buying their holding, at 5% interest repayable over 35 years if the landlord was willing to sell (no compulsory powers).

== Effects ==
The historian J. C. Beckett claimed that the act "failed, at almost every point, to achieve the purpose for which it was intended" but despite the practical failure the act also "marked a decisive advance towards a solution of the agrarian problem". The act left it to the courts to decide where the Ulster custom existed; it was up to the tenant to prove that the custom applied to his tenure and that the rights he was seeking to establish were included in the custom.

The clauses relating to custom affected only a minority of the 600,000 tenant farmers in Ireland. Therefore, it was the clauses relating to yearly tenants unprotected by custom which formed the most important clauses in the act. Although the clauses on compensation for improvements were significantly better than previous legislation, their power was limited by the complicated procedure for claiming and assessing compensation. The overall effect, however, was to strengthen the position of the tenant by presuming that the improvements were his work.

According to Australian historian Philip Bull, the bill struck at the heart of the traditional concept of the union between Britain and Ireland, by creating a new law that would affect only the latter, and also at English conceptions of property rights.

== Subsequent developments ==
The following provisions were repealed by section 1(1) of, and the first schedule to, the Statute Law Revision Act 1950 (14 Geo. 6. c. 6), which came into force on 23 May 1950.

- In sections 44 and 45 the words from the beginning to " in the term of thirty-five years "
- Sections 46, 47 and 54

The whole act was repealed by section 38 of the Property (Northern Ireland) Order 1997, which came into force on 10 January 2000.

== See also ==
- Land Acts (Ireland)

== Bibliography ==
- Beckett, J. C. (1981). The Making of Modern Ireland 1603–1923. London: Faber and Faber.
- Bull, Philip (1996). Land, Politics and Nationalism: a Study of the Irish Land Question. Dublin: Gill & Macmillan.
- Morley, John (1903). The Life of William Ewart Gladstone. Volume II. London: Macmillan.
- Reid, Wemyss, ed. (1899). The Life of William Ewart Gladstone. Cassell.
