= Land Law (Ireland) Act 1881 =

Act of the Parliament of the United Kingdom

Land Law (Ireland) Act 1881 (Note: Section 62.)
- Act of Parliament
- Parliament of the United Kingdom
- Long title: An Act to further amend the Law relating to the Occupation and Ownership of Land in Ireland, and for other purposes relating thereto.
- Citation: 44 & 45 Vict. c. 49
- Introduced by: William Gladstone (Commons)
- Territorial extent: Ireland (Note: Section 61.)

Dates
- Royal assent: 22 August 1881
- Commencement: 22 August 1881 (Note: The Acts of Parliament (Commencement) Act 1793.)
- Repealed: 10 January 2000 (Note: The Property (1997 Order) (Commencement No. 2) Order (Northern Ireland) 1999 (SI 1999/461).)
Other legislation
Amends	Landlord and Tenant (Ireland) Act 1870
Amended by	Labourers Cottages and Allotments (Ireland) Act 1882; Public Works Loans Act 1882; Purchase of Land (Ireland) Act 1885; Land Law (Ireland) Act 1887; Purchase of Land (Ireland) Act 1891; Land Law (Ireland) Act 1896; Irish Land Act 1903; Northern Ireland Land Act 1925; Northern Ireland Land Purchase (Winding Up) Act 1935; Statute Law Revision Act 1950; Statute Law Revision (Northern Ireland) Act 1980
Repealed by	Property (Northern Ireland) Order 1997
Relates to	Land Acts (Ireland)

Status: Repealed

Status
- Republic of Ireland: Amended
- Northern Ireland: Repealed

History of passage through Parliament

Text of statute as originally enacted

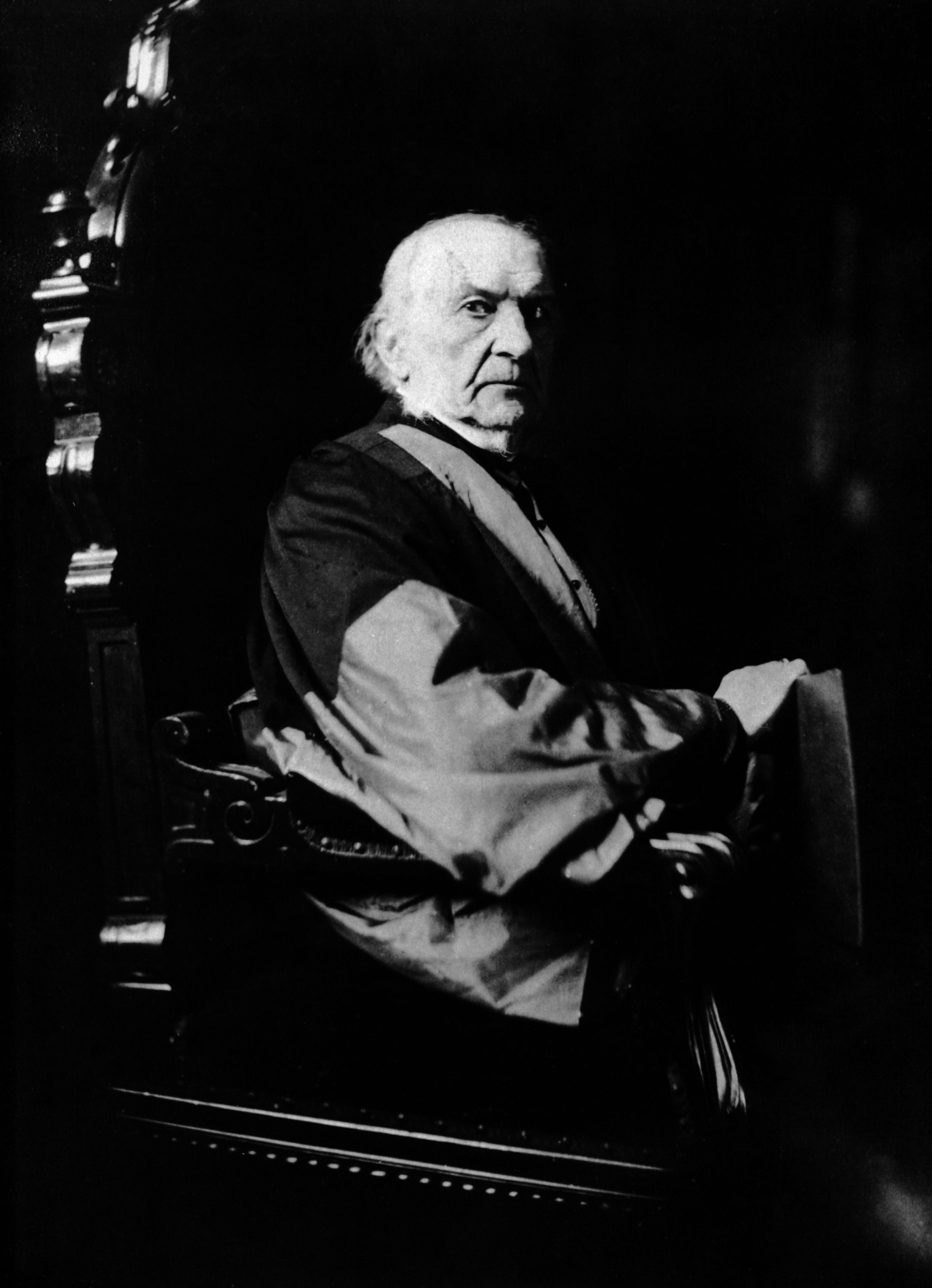
W. E. Gladstone

The Land Law (Ireland) Act 1881 (44 & 45 Vict. c. 49) was an act of the Parliament of the United Kingdom which was the second Irish land act.

== Background ==
The Liberal government of William Ewart Gladstone had previously passed the Landlord and Tenant (Ireland) Act 1870 (33 & 34 Vict. c. 46) in an attempt to solve the problem of tenant-landlord relations in Ireland. However, the act was seen to have failed in its purpose. The Home Rule Party had been formed in 1873 and was rapidly turning previously Liberal seats into Home Rule seats.

Gladstone visited Ireland in autumn 1877, spending almost a month in County Wicklow and Dublin. Gladstone wrote in his diary that he ensured he visited "farms, cottages & people", including conversing with Irishmen and "turning my small opportunities to account as well as I could". When he had to spend a day in Dublin amongst the English establishment there, he lamented: "...not enough of Ireland".

The Liberals were elected in 1880. The Cabinet discussed the Coercion Act and an extension of the Bright Land Purchase clauses of the 1870 Act and decided that it was unnecessary to renew the Coercion Act that would expire on 1 June and that amending the Land Act was too complex for that year, the 1880 parliamentary session being a short one. Gladstone wrote to the Duke of Argyll on 14 June, regarding the eviction of tenants: "We never considered the question of ejectments connected with the present distress in Ireland.... I was under the impression that ejectments were diminishing, but I now find from figures first seen on Saturday [12 June] that they seem rather to increase... the duty of enquiring, where I had not previously known there was urgent cause to inquire".

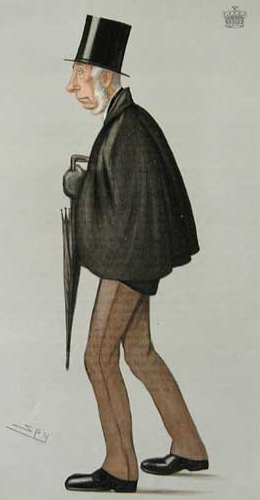
Lord Bessborough

A Royal Commission under Lord Bessborough (who held an Irish earldom) was set up in June to enquire into the workings of the 1870 Act and it sat between September and January 1881. It held 65 sessions, heard evidence from 80 landlords, 70 agents, 500 tenants as well from a diverse range of other people. The Commission looked into all aspects of Irish agriculture and the effects of the agricultural depression caused by the export of huge quantities of cheap food from the prairie farms of North America. The Report of the Commission decided for the three Fs: fixity of tenure, fair rents and free sale.

At the end of the year Gladstone wrote that "the state of Ireland in particular" was the chief concern of the year and came to see Ireland as "a judgment for our heavy sins as a nation". He was alarmed at the recommendations of the Commission and was angry at what he considered as the "unmanliness" and "astounding helplessness" of the Irish landlords in their failure to resist the Land League during the Land War. To balance out a renewal of coercion, Gladstone believed that a new Land Act was needed, and the Cabinet decided in favour. Gladstone wrote to the Chief Secretary for Ireland, William Edward Forster, on 10 January 1881 to enquire from him an assessment of Irish demands in order to discover "a definitive settlement" of the land question.

On 31 March, the Duke of Argyll (a landlord himself) resigned from the government in protest against the Bill.

Gladstone introduced the bill in the House of Commons on 7 April. In his speech, Gladstone proclaimed that "the old law of the country, corresponding, I believe, with the general law of Europe, recognizes the tenant right, and therefore recognizes, if you choose to call it, joint proprietorship". He added that "there is no country in the world which, when her social relations come to permit it, will derive more benefit than Ireland from perfect freedom of contract in land. Unhappily she is not in a state to permit of it; but I will not abandon the hope that the period may arrive". The economic situation of Ireland demanded larger farms, but the Bill consolidated the division of Irish land into smallholdings. Gladstone said, "I decline to enter into the economical part of the subject". The Land Court clauses were "the salient point and the cardinal principle of the Bill". The court would inject order into the confused state of Irish social relations, creating stability and reconciliation where coercion could not reach. He added that it was a "right and needful measure" but was also a "form of centralization, referring to public authority what ought to be transacted by a private individual" and urged the Irish not to "stereotype and stamp [it] with the seal of perpetuity".

The Irish nationalist politician John Dillon remarked on 13 April: "I very much fear that this Act was drawn by a man who was set to study the whole history of our organisation and was told to draw an Act that would kill the Land League".

== Provisions ==
The act embodied the demand for the three Fs. Land courts were empowered to fix a judicial rent upon application by a landlord or a tenant and the amount decided upon was fixed for 15 years. A rent voluntarily agreed upon by landlord and tenant and registered in the court was also to be fixed for 15 years. On land purchase, the amount to be advanced by the state was increased from two thirds to three quarters of the purchase money, to be repaid over 35 years.

== Effects ==
The act instituted a system of dual ownership of the land, reducing the landlord to not much more than a receiver of rents. As a consequence, landlords were afterwards more open to land purchase. The financial assistance was too small to attract tenants as they could not afford it, and only a few hundred holdings were bought under the act.

For tenants in Ulster, the act was seen as fulfilling all of their demands and they immediately used the act to adjust rents. Although after a few years' experience of the act land agitation resurfaced to a limited extent, the possibility of the Protestant tenants of Ulster uniting with the Catholic tenants in the rest of Ireland, such as had been attempted in the Tenant Right League of the 1850s and in the 1874 Tenant Right convention in Belfast, disappeared.

== Subsequent developments ==
The following provisions were repealed by section 1(1) of, and the first schedule to, the Statute Law Revision Act 1950 (14 Geo. 6. c. 6), which came into force on 23 May 1950.

- Section 4(4).
- Section 8 so far as unrepealed.
- Section 13(3) " day of the date of application.".
- Section 19.
- Sections 24 and 26 so far as unrepealed.
- Section 29.
- Section 30(3) so far as unrepealed.
- Section 34 so far as unrepealed.
- Sections 35 and 36.
- Section 39.
- Section 41.
- In section 42 the words from the beginning to " styled ' the Irish Land Commission ' ".
- Sections 43–47 so far as unrepealed.
- Section 49.
- Section 53 so far as unrepealed.
- Sections 54 and 55.
- Section sixty.

The whole act was repealed by section 38 of the Property (Northern Ireland) Order 1997, which came into force on 10 January 2000.

== Bibliography ==
- J. C. Beckett, The Making of Modern Ireland 1603-1923 (London: Faber and Faber, 1981).
- H. C. G. Matthew, Gladstone. 1875–1898 (Oxford: Oxford University Press, 1995).
