= 2011 United Kingdom budget =

- Presented: 23 March 2011
- Country: United Kingdom
- Parliament: 55th
- Party: Coalition government
- Chancellor: George Osborne
- Total revenue: £589 billion (41% of 2010 GDP)
- Total expenditures: £711 billion (50% of 2010 GDP)
- Deficit: £121 billion (8.5% of 2010 GDP)
- Website: 2011 Budget

The 2011 United Kingdom budget, officially called 2011 Budget – A strong and stable economy, growth and fairness, was delivered by George Osborne, the Chancellor of the Exchequer, to the House of Commons on 23 March 2011.

It was the second budget of the Conservative-Liberal Democrat coalition government formed in 2010, and the second to be delivered by Osborne.

Osborne quoted data and projections from the Office for Budget Responsibility relating to economic growth, inflation and borrowing. Key measures taken or introduced included increasing the personal tax allowance, cuts in corporation tax, a cut in fuel duty, and a new equity loan scheme designed to help first-time buyers in the property market.

== Economy ==
Osborne announced that the Office for Budget Responsibility had cut its growth forecast for 2011 from 2.1% to 1.7%, and for 2012 from 2.6% to 2.5%.

In the June 2010 Budget and autumn spending review, he had already committed the Government to spending cuts to tackle the UK's deficit. He therefore made no further sweeping changes, but announced a Budget "about reforming the nation's economy, so that we have enduring growth and jobs in the future."

Forecasts for borrowing had fallen to £146 billion in 2011, £122 billion in 2012 and £29 billion by 2015–16. The national debt was estimated at 60% of current national income, rising to 71% in 2012 before starting to fall back to 69% by 2015.

== Key measures taken or introduced ==
=== Taxes ===
Receipts	2011–12 Revenues (£bn)
Income Tax	158
National Insurance	101
Value Added Tax (VAT)	100
Corporate Tax	48
Excise duties	46
Council Tax	26
Business rates	25
Other	85
Total Government revenue	589

Osborne announced that in April 2012, the personal tax allowance would be increased by £630 to £8,015, in line with Liberal Democrat policy. "Non-domiciled" residents in the UK will be levied up to £50,000 per annum.

Additionally, Osborne announced a consultation on long-term plans to merge income tax and National Insurance in order to simplify the tax system.

Corporation tax would be cut by 2% in April 2011, rather than the 1% previously planned. Further reductions of 1% in each of the next three years would reduce it to 23%. The temporary tax rate relief for small businesses would be extended to October 2012.

Council Tax was frozen or reduced in 2011 in every English council. The rise in air passenger duty was also frozen for a year, though users of private jets would have to pay a passenger duty for the first time.

Osborne deferred until 2012 a rise in fuel duty that had been planned for April 2011, and cancelled the previous government's fuel duty escalator for the remainder of the parliament. Instead he increased the supplementary charge levied on North Sea oil and gas companies from 20% to 32%, generating £2 billion to finance an immediate cut in duty of 1p per litre. The Value-added tax on fuel would remain unchanged and road tax would be increased in line with inflation (except for large goods vehicles for which road tax would be frozen).

No changes were made to alcohol duty rates but a rise of 2% above the rate of inflation in excise duties for wine and beer did go ahead as planned. Tobacco duty rates were also raised by 2% above inflation.

=== Spending ===
Department	2011–12 Expenditure (£bn)
Social protection	200
Health	126
Education	89
Debt interest	50
Defence	40
Public order and safety	33
Personal social services	32
Housing and Environment	24
Transport	23
Industry, agriculture and employment	20
Other	74
Total Government spending	711

Public spending measures included an extra 40,000 apprenticeships for young people out of work, 100,000 new work experience placements, and 12 new university technical colleges (UTCs), doubling the number to at least 24.

Osborne also allocated £100 million of new money for science, financed by the bank levy, £80 million of which would be invested in new research centres in Daresbury, Norwich and Cambridge, and the remainder would be for projects in Harwell.

£100 million would be allocated to repairing potholes in England, following the severe winter, and £200 million to regional railways, including the construction of the Ordsall Chord in Manchester and the double-tracking of the line between Swindon and Kemble.

Britain's role in the military intervention in Libya would be financed entirely by the Treasury and Treasury reserve.

The Budget also provided £250 million, financed by the bank levy, to boost the home construction industry and to help first-time buyers with incomes of up to £60,000 to buy a new-build property. The scheme, available for one year, requires buyers to save a deposit of 5% of the purchase price, with the government and housebuilders each providing 10% through an equity loan, enabling the buyer to qualify for a 75% loan-to-value mortgage. The equity loan would be interest-free for the first five years.

== Prior announcements and discussions ==
The date of the Budget was announced by Sir George Young on 4 November 2010. Only a few weeks' notice had been given for the previous government's budgets, and this was one of the earliest budget date announcements on record.

In his 2010 Autumn Statement, Osborne said the Office for Budget Responsibility had increased its growth forecast for 2010 from 1.2% to 1.8%, but reduced its predictions for the following two years. It had also reduced its forecast for public sector job losses, and did not expect a double-dip recession.

Osborne also announced "the most significant programme of corporation tax reforms for a generation". The main area subject to change is the taxation of multinational companies on overseas earnings. However, Deloitte's head of tax policy, Bill Dodwell, said the proposals went no further than the previous government had already announced. Detail was also lacking and, while some interim measures were expected in the 2011 budget, observers expected to wait until 2012 to see the full overhaul.

Income tax personal allowances for people under the age of 65 were expected to be raised in line with the Government's commitment to raise the allowance to £10,000 over the course of the parliament, a key Liberal Democrat policy. To pay for this, a range of measures were expected to close tax loopholes for the wealthy. An initiative to counter tax avoidance with a target of £500 million per annum was announced in December 2010, but the expected take had doubled to £1 billion by March 2011.

== Reactions after the Budget speech ==
Ed Miliband, Leader of the Opposition, responded with sarcasm to the Budget's stated goals of growth and recovery. He said that the economic slowdown in the last quarter was evidence that the Government was going "too far, too fast" to reduce the deficit, and accused Osborne of indifference to social damage.

Miliband also claimed that the budget speech had sent Kenneth Clarke, Justice Secretary and former Chancellor, to sleep. A spokesman for Clarke denied this, but bookmaker Ladbrokes paid out on bets at 16/1 that Clarke would drop off during the speech.

Robert Peston, the BBC's business editor, suggested that the Chancellor would be seen to have chosen "a principled Budget rather than a crowd-pleasing one".

The Confederation of British Industry and other business groups welcomed the Budget, saying that it would create jobs. However, speaking for the Trades Union Congress, Brendan Barber welcomed some measures including help for apprenticeship and the cut in fuel duty, but said that overall it had been a "no change Budget".

The changes in corporation tax were sufficient to encourage companies such as WPP to move their headquarters back to the UK.

John Whiting, tax director of the Office of Tax Simplification, was disappointed that the review of National Insurance would not go as far as a full merger with income tax, even though this could have meant imposing higher taxes on pensioners.

Countrywide research in the days after the Budget showed that the fuel duty cut had indeed resulted in fuel prices falling, but not by the 1p per litre announced by Osborne. Prices fell by an average of 0.6p per litre following the immediate duty cut; some motorists reported that fuel retailers had raised their prices prior to the Budget, meaning that despite the duty cut the prices were still the same or higher. The increase in taxes on oil & gas production had widespread effects on the upstream industry – within weeks Centrica mothballed the main part of the Morecambe Bay gas field, responsible for 6% of UK gas supply. As an older field it paid 81% tax after the Budget. Statoil immediately put on hold the US$10bn development of the Mariner and Bressay fields containing 600 million barrels of oil, with their head of international development and production saying "They've wanted more developments offshore U.K. and then they come and slam the door in our face...There are a lot of assets in the U.K. that aren't all that interesting anymore now." In response Osborne increased the Ring Fence Expenditure Supplement allowance for development costs, and Statoil resumed work on the fields.

== See also ==
- United Kingdom government austerity programme
- 2008 financial crisis
- Cameron–Clegg coalition
- United Kingdom national debt
- Taxation in the United Kingdom
- Whole of Government Accounts
