= Gilt-edged securities =

Bonds issued by the UK government

Gilt-edged securities, also referred to as gilts, are bonds issued by the UK Government to finance the national debt and fund government expenditure (both current and capital in nature); thus they represent a debt owing from the government. They are sterling-denominated, tradeable debt instruments that are generally regarded as carrying very low credit risk and form the core of the United Kingdom’s marketable central government debt. The term is of British origin, and referred to the debt securities issued by the Bank of England on behalf of His Majesty's Treasury, whose paper certificates had a gilt (or gilded) edge.

In 2002, the data collected by the British Office for National Statistics revealed that at that time about two-thirds of all UK gilts were held by insurance companies and pension funds, but the proportion has since rapidly reduced, due especially to the decline in defined benefit pension schemes. Since 2009, large quantities of gilts have been created and repurchased by the Bank of England under its policy of quantitative easing. Having been traditionally regarded as a "safe haven" asset class, overseas investors held around 31 percent of gilts in issue by the second quarter of 2024.

On 2 September 2025, the UK Debt Management Office sold a record £14 billion of the 4.75% October 2035 gilt with the highest yield since 2008. The syndicated offering of the new 10-year gilt was oversubscribed with more than £141 billion of orders.

Modern gilt-edged securities fall into several main types:

- Conventional gilts pay a fixed cash coupon every six months and repay their nominal principal at a specified maturity date.

- Some conventional gilts are designated as green gilts: their proceeds are allocated, under a published government framework, to eligible environmental and climate-related expenditures.

- Index-linked gilts have coupons and principal that are adjusted in line with a measure of inflation, historically the Retail Prices Index.

Many gilts are eligible to be separated into their individual cash flows and traded as gilt strips.

A small amount of legacy undated and double-dated gilts remained into the early 21st century before being redeemed.

== Nomenclature ==
In his 2019 book about the gilt market from 1928 to 1972, William A. Allen described gilt-edged securities as "long‐duration liabilities of the UK A small number of legacy undated and double-dated gilts remained in circulation into the early twenty-first century before being redeemed, government" that were traded on the London Stock Exchange.

Today, the term "gilt-edged security" or simply "gilt" is used in the United Kingdom as well as some Commonwealth nations, such as South Africa and India. However, when reference is made to "gilts", what is generally meant is UK gilts, unless otherwise specified. Colloquially, the term "gilt-edged" is sometimes used to denote high-grade securities, consequently carrying low yields, as opposed to relatively riskier, below investment-grade securities.

Gilt-edged market makers (GEMMs) are banks or securities houses registered with the Bank of England which have certain obligations, such as taking part in gilt auctions.

The term "gilt account" is also used by the Reserve Bank of India to refer to a constituent account maintained by a custodian bank for maintenance and servicing of dematerialized government securities owned by a retail customer.

== History ==
Following the 1688 Glorious Revolution, with the founding in 1694 of the Bank of England by royal charter, King William III borrowed £1,200,000 from the bank's 1,268 private subscribers to bank stock in order to fund the war with France. This marked the inception of what became a permanent or perpetual national public debt, with the Stock Exchange dealing in UK government securities. The government debt securities were issued as paper certificates with gilded edges, which denoted official authority and protected against counterfeiting. This physical characteristic gave rise to the market shorthand "gilt-edged securities", later abbreviated to 'gilts' since the gold-leaf border became synonymous with a sovereign guarantee.

With the war ongoing, and the Great Recoinage of 1696 placing additional strain on the nation's finances, the Committee of Ways and Means resolved to establish a National Land Bank (as a rival to the Bank of England) to raise further capital; while the Land Bank scheme failed, a second provision in the National Land Bank Act 1696 (7 & 8 Will. 3. c. 31), empowering the Exchequer to raise up to £1,500,000 in the security of 'indented bills of credit', was a success: subsequently, Exchequer bills remained in regular use as a source of government revenue up until 1892.

The next major public debt incurred by the government was the South Sea Bubble of 1720, which took on a substantial portion of the national debt in exchange for trading privileges. The South Sea Bubble of 1720 and its aftermath led to a restructuring of government obligations and to a clearer separation between government debt and private joint-stock companies. Over the eighteenth and early nineteenth centuries, successive governments consolidated a variety of annuities and other instruments into fewer, larger issues that could be more easily traded.

One important outcome of this process was the emergence of consols, perpetual bonds that paid a fixed coupon with no fixed redemption date. Consols came to represent a large share of outstanding government debt and were widely held by domestic and overseas investors throughout the nineteenth century. Their perceived security and liquidity helped to underpin London’s role as a leading international financial centre.

In 1927, the chancellor of the Exchequer, Winston Churchill issued 4% consols or securities, in part to refinance World War I National War Bonds. In 2014, when they were to be repaid, these consols were valued at £218 million.

The government sells bonds in order to raise the money it needs, like an IOU to be paid back at a future date—mainly from five to thirty years in the future—with interest. This form of government borrowing proved successful and became a common way to fund wars and later infrastructure projects when tax revenue was not sufficient to cover their costs. Many of the early issues were perpetual, having no fixed maturity date. These were issued under various names but were later generally referred to as consols.

Over time, the UK government moved away from undated securities towards dated bonds with specific maturities, which are now generally referred to as gilts. The modern gilt market developed from the mid-twentieth century onwards, with more systematic issuance programmes and, from the late 1990s, the establishment of the Debt Management Office to manage the central government’s debt sales and associated risk on behalf of HM Treasury.

== Conventional gilts ==
Conventional gilts are the simplest form of UK government bond and make up the largest share of the gilt portfolio (75% as of October 2016). A conventional gilt is a bond issued by the UK government which pays the holder a fixed cash payment (or coupon) every six months until maturity, at which point the holder receives their final coupon payment and the return of the principal.

=== Coupon rate ===
Conventional gilts are denoted by their coupon rate and maturity year, e.g. 4 1/2% Treasury Gilt 2055. The coupon is expressed as an annual percentage of the gilt’s nominal value, which is typically £100. Payments are made in two equal instalments each year, so the holder of £1,000 nominal of a 4 1/2% gilt would normally receive £45 in coupon income per year, split into two payments of £22.50, until the bond matures and the principal is repaid.

In the secondary market, conventional gilts may trade at a premium or discount to their nominal value. When market interest rates fall below the coupon rate, the price of an existing gilt tends to rise above par. When market rates rise above the coupon, the price tends to fall below par. The yield to maturity incorporates both the coupon income and any capital gain or loss on redemption.

=== Inverse relationship ===
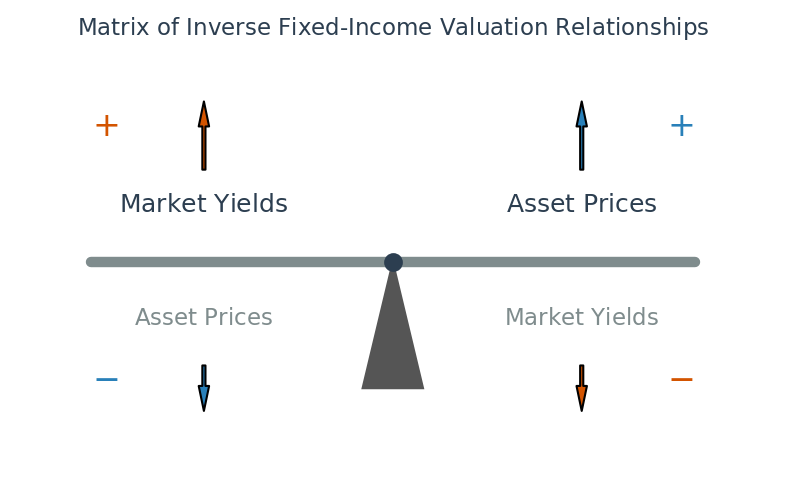
Bidirectional inverse relationship between market yield shifts and secondary market gilt prices.

The relationship between gilt prices and interest rates is an inverse one. When gilt prices fall, the yield will be higher. Conversely, when gilt prices rise, the yield will fall. The inverse relationship is non-linear, often represented by an outwardly bowed curve, and the inverse effect is not proportional. Due to the coupon rate remaining constant for conventional gilts, the price has to adapt in the secondary market in order to reflect the prevailing market conditions and to remain competitive in relation to new debt. Undated gilts are particularly sensitive to fluctuations in interest rates.

=== Price sensitivity and duration ===
The degree to which a gilt's price fluctuates in response to interest rate changes is measured by its duration. This sensitivity is influenced by both maturity and the coupon rate; generally, gilts with longer maturities or lower coupon rates exhibit greater price volatility when interest rates pivot. Consequently, long-dated gilts are significantly more susceptible to price swings than short-dated ones. Such volatility was a primary driver of the price collapses seen in long-dated gilts during the market volatility of autumn 2022, exacerbated by forced selling from liability-driven investment funds.

This vulnerability highlights systemic duration risk, which represents the hazard that an investor faces when capital is locked into long-dated fixed income instruments during a rising interest rate environment. Since duration decays as bonds approach maturity, this risk acts as an asymmetric operational trap, where a sharp upward pivot in yields inflicts high-velocity capital depreciation requiring pull-to-par accretion for eventual price recovery. Consequently, managing duration risk requires a strict understanding of macro-regime shifts, as the structural sensitivity of a portfolio to rate volatility directly governs its overall insulation from forced market liquidations.

=== Pull-to-par effect ===
As a conventional gilt approaches its final maturity date, its price on the secondary market naturally converges toward its nominal redemption face value, which is typically £100 per bond unit. This mathematical price path is driven purely by the temporal approach to the redemption obligation and is known as the pull-to-par effect (or reduction of maturity).

The underlying mechanism is independent of shifting macroeconomic variables or interest rate volatility, assuming a fixed yield-to-maturity framework. For a premium gilt—issued with a coupon rate that sits higher than prevailing market yields—the secondary market clean price will steadily amortise downward over time to settle at par (£100). Conversely, for a discount gilt—where the low coupon distribution falls beneath current market interest expectations—the clean price undergoes compounding capital accretion, forcing the market value upward until the discount gap is entirely erased at maturity.

As the time horizon shortens, the bond's modified duration decays toward zero, eliminating its sensitivity to changes in systemic market interest rates. Consequently, any historical price premiums or discounts generated by macroeconomic yield shifts will erode over the bond's lifespan, collapsing entirely by the mandated redemption date.

=== Tax equivalent yield ===
The tax equivalent yield (TEY), also known as the gross equivalent yield (GEY), is a financial metric used by private retail investors in the United Kingdom to evaluate the performance of conventional gilt-edged securities relative to taxable investments. Since all capital gains generated by gilt-edged securities are legally exempt from United Kingdom Capital Gains Tax (CGT), the bond's mechanical accretion to par value can be captured by investors on a tax-free basis, whereas the periodic coupon distributions remain fully subject to income tax. To calculate this metric, the net gilt yield to maturity—representing the total annualised return from both coupon income and capital accretion after adjusting the coupon for the investor's marginal tax rate—is divided by the complement of the individual's income tax bracket (typically 20% for basic rate, 40% for higher rate, or 45% for additional rate taxpayers). For example, a low-coupon gilt delivering a 4.0% net yield to maturity provides a tax equivalent yield of 6.67% (to a higher-rate taxpayer), meaning a fully taxable bank savings account would need to offer a gross interest rate of 6.67% to equate to the post-taxation return of the gilt.

=== Gilt names ===
Historically, gilt names referred to their purpose of issuance, or signified how a stock had been created, such as 10 1/4% Conversion Stock 1999; or different names were used for different gilts simply to minimise confusion between them. In more recent times, gilts have been generally named Treasury Stocks. Since 2005–2006, all new issues of gilts have been called Treasury Gilts.

== Index-linked gilts ==
Index-linked gilts account for around a quarter of UK government debt within the gilt market. The UK was one of the first developed economies to issue index-linked bonds on 27 March 1981. Initially only tax-exempt pension funds were allowed to hold these bonds. By January 2003, the UK Debt Management Office had issued 11 gilts of this type and according to an analysis in The Economic History Review, the cumulative issuance had increased to around 60 index-linked bonds by mid-2019. As at 26 August 2025 the DMO Gilts in Issue report individually lists 35 index-linked gilts.

Index-linked gilts pay coupons which are set, at the time of issue, in line with market interest rates, then the principal payment along with the semi-annual coupons are adjusted in line with movements in the General Index of Retail Prices (RPI) over time. The price of an index-linked gilt reflects expectations of future inflation as well as real interest rates, credit risk and liquidity in the gilt market.

Ultra-long index-linked bonds, maturing in 2062 and 2068, were issued in October 2011 and June 2013 respectively, (the latter reissued September 2013), and a 2065 maturity was issued in February 2016. In November 2021, the DMO issued a 50-year index-linked gilt with a maturity date of 2073.

=== Indexation lag ===
As with all index-linked bonds, there are time lags between the collection of prices data, the publication of the inflation index and the indexation of the bond. From their introduction in 1981, index-linked gilts had an eight-month indexation lag (between the month of collection of prices data and the month of indexation of the bond). This was so that the amount of the next coupon was known at the start of each six-month interest accrual period. However, in 2005 the UK Debt Management Office announced that all new issues of index-linked gilts would use a three-month indexation lag, first used in the Canadian Real Return Bond market, and the vast majority of index-linked gilts now in issue are structured on that basis.

== Double-dated gilts ==
In the past, the UK government issued many double-dated gilts, which had a range of maturity dates at the option of the government. The last remaining such stock was redeemed in December 2013.

== Green gilts ==
Green gilts are UK government bonds whose proceeds are earmarked for expenditure on environmental and climate-related projects under the government’s Green Financing Framework. They are structurally conventional gilts, with fixed coupons paid semi-annually and principal repaid at maturity. The money raised by the bonds are earmarked for environmental spending, such as on projects including flood defences, renewable energy, or carbon capture and storage.

In September 2021, the UK held its inaugural green gilt sale, which was met with record demand with investors placing over £100 billion in bids. The following month, a second green gilt with a duration of 32 years raised £6 billion. The UK's Debt Management Office (DMO) issued over £16.1 billion of green gilts during the 2021-2022 financial year. The 12-year bond, issued in 2021, will mature in July 2033, and was priced with an initial issuance yield of approximately 0.872 percent.

On 10 March 2026, the UK's Debt Management Office successfully launched the £6.25 billion (nominal) 4 5/8% Green Gilt 2037 which saw record demand with a total order book of over £80 billion (nominal). The allocation was primarily domestic, with UK-based investors accounting for approximately two-thirds of the final issuance. This marked the UK's third green gilt since the programme's inception in 2021, and was the first to be issued under the government's updated 2025 Green Financing Framework, which has the effect of expanding the eligible expenditures to include nuclear energy projects. This issuance was also notable for being the first green gilt to be made available to retail investors at the initial launch through the Winterflood Retail Access Platform (WRAP).

== Undated gilts ==
=== Historical undated gilts ===
Until late 2014, there existed eight undated gilts, which by then made up a very small proportion of the UK government's debt. They had no fixed maturity date. These gilts were very old: some, such as consols, dated from the 18th century. The largest, War Loan, was issued in the early 20th century. The redemption (payout of the principal) of these bonds was at the discretion of the UK government, but because of their age, they all had low coupons, and so for a long time there was little incentive for the government to redeem them. Because the outstanding amounts were relatively very small, there was a very limited market in most of these gilts.

In 2014 the government announced that 4% Consolidated Loan and 3½% War Loan, along with other undated issues, would be redeemed in early 2015 as part of a strategy to retire very long-standing debt. During 2015 the remaining undated gilts, including 2½% Consolidated Stock, were repaid, with 2½% Consolidated Stock being redeemed on 5 July 2015 following the exercise of an embedded call option. As a result, no undated gilts remain in issue.

== Gilt strips ==
Many gilts can be "stripped" into their individual cash flows, namely interest (the periodic coupon payments) and principal (the ultimate repayment of the investment) which can be traded separately as zero-coupon gilts, or gilt strips. This allows investors to obtain specific cash-flow profiles and helps in constructing term structures of interest rates. For example, a ten-year gilt can be stripped to make 21 separate securities: 20 strips based on the coupons, which are entitled to just one of the half-yearly interest payments; and one strip entitled to the redemption payment at the end of the ten years. The title "Separately Traded and Registered Interest and Principal Securities" was created as a reverse acronym for "strips".

The UK gilt strip market was introduced in December 1997. Under the strip facility, only certain gilts designated as "strippable" are eligible to be stripped into, and reconstituted from, their component cash flows. Stripping and reconstitution take place within the CREST settlement system, and participation is largely confined to institutions such as gilt-edged market makers (GEMMs) and other professional investors.

By the early 2000s, a substantial volume of gilts had been stripped, amounting to more than £100 billion of nominal stock and representing a significant share of eligible issues. The strips market continues to provide a specialised segment of the gilt market, used by investors who require precise timing of cash flows or who are active in managing interest rate risk along the yield curve.

== Maturity of gilts ==
The maturity of gilts is classified by the UK Debt Management Office (DMO) as follows: short, 0–7 years; medium, 7–15 years; and long, more than 15 years. This classification is used in the DMO's financing remit and in official statistics on the composition of the gilt portfolio. Upon reaching its final maturity date, a gilt held within an investor's portfolio triggers an automated, par-value cash redemption, where the central government credits the principal capital sum directly back to the holder's cash balance via their investment platform.

While this foundational, trifurcated classification serves as the structural baseline for the UK Debt Management Office's (DMO) financing remit, the practical reality of the gilt-edged marketplace spans a far more expansive chronological layout. At the absolute near-cash floor, the sovereign debt matrix is supported by ultra-short instruments, including highly liquid Treasury bills with maturities ranging from one to six months, which act as critical tactical cash management channels for the state. This baseline tier is seamlessly augmented by conventional shorts (0–7 years) and mediums (7–15 years), which represent the absolute core of marketable UK central government liabilities and carry the highest concentration of trading volume across secondary market matching engines.

Conversely, the expansion of the long-dated category has seen the strategic introduction of ultra-long conventional and index-linked gilts with maturities progressively extending out to 30, 50, and 55 years. These highly specialised, long-duration instruments are systematically engineered to serve as structural asset-liability matching tools for large institutional pension funds and insurance consortia. Because these funds carry contractual, multi-decade cash-flow obligations to beneficiaries, they aggressively absorb ultra-long maturities to permanently firewall their portfolios from short-term interest rate volatility and reinvestment friction.

Historically, the maturity spectrum also featured a distinct category of undated or perpetual gilts—most famously exemplified by War Loans and Consols—which carried no legally binding redemption dates and paid fixed coupons indefinitely at the sovereign's discretion. This historical spectrum shifted permanently in 2015 when HM Treasury exercised its call options to fully redeem all outstanding perpetual debt. Although the financial scale of these remaining obligations was negligible relative to the modern macroeconomy—representing a minute, legacy administrative cleanup of fragmented family estates—the redemption left the active market consisting solely of bonds with fixed maturity dates. Consequently, managing contemporary issuance spectrums requires the DMO to carefully balance short-term funding costs against the changing maturity preferences of global institutional desks to insulate the state from refinancing risk.

== Trends ==
The most noticeable trends in the gilt market in recent years have been:

- Flight to quality during market stress: Conventional gilts are increasingly functioning as safe-haven assets, with investor demand intensifying during periods of acute financial instability or uncertainty in global equity markets.
- Structural regime shifts and yield volatility: Following a multi-decade secular decline that culminated in record-low yields during the 2010s and early 2020s, the gilt market has transitioned into a higher-yield regime. This trend has been driven by persistent inflation expectations, elevated central bank policy rates, the unwinding of quantitative easing, and heightened market sensitivity to domestic fiscal policy and sovereign debt supply.
- A decline in coupons: Several gilts were issued in the 1970s and 1980s with coupons of ≥10% per annum, but these have now matured.
- A large and prolonged increase in the overall volume of issuance as the public sector borrowing requirement has increased.
- An increase in the volume of issuance of very long dated gilts, partly reflecting demand from pension funds and insurance companies for long-term sterling assets.
- Active balance sheet management: Large quantities of gilts were purchased by the Bank of England under its quantitative easing programme starting in 2009, with the trend reversing from 2022 onward as the central bank began active asset sales to reduce its balance sheet under quantitative tightening.
- The growth of syndication: Large-scale syndicated gilt offerings have become increasingly common as a vehicle for high-volume launches, particularly for new benchmark securities. This was evidenced on 14 April 2026, when the Debt Management Office (DMO) sold a record £15.0 billion of a new 10-year gilt, the 4.875% Treasury Gilt 2036 (ISIN: GB00BWBR1N39). This sale attracted a record-breaking order book of £148.2 billion (nominal), making it the most oversubscribed syndicated gilt offering in history. The launch yield of 4.9158% was the highest for a 10-year gilt issuance since the 2008 financial crisis.
- 2020s yield escalation: Following a prolonged period of historically low yields, global inflationary pressures and shifting macroeconomic policies caused UK borrowing costs to rise sharply. In September 2026, a £4 billion syndication of 30-year conventional gilts achieved an average yield of 5.82%, marking the highest borrowing cost incurred by the UK government at a debt sale since 1998. This upward trajectory further escalated on 1 October 2026 when the benchmark 30-year gilt yield crossed the 6% threshold for the first time since January 1998.

== See also ==
- List of government bonds
- Debt Management Office (United Kingdom)
- Government bond
- HM Treasury
