= History of Ireland (1801–1923) =

From Acts of Union to Irish Free State

Ireland Éire (Irish)
- 1801–1922
- Flag Coat of arms
- Anthem: "God Save the King"; 1801–1837; 1901–1922 "God Save the Queen"; 1837–1901
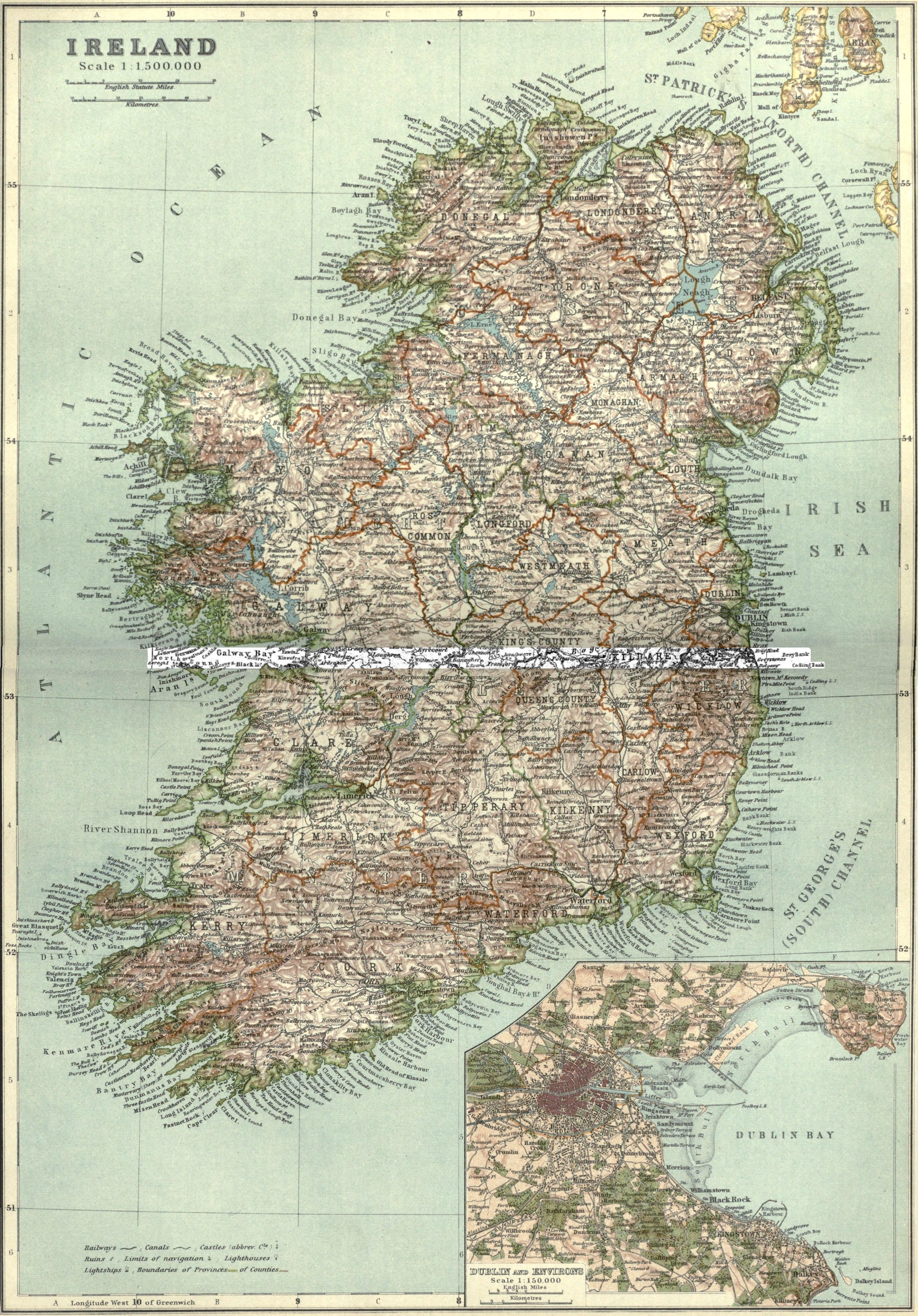
- Map of Ireland in 1911 Encyclopædia Britannica eleventh edition
- Status: Country of the United Kingdom of Great Britain and Ireland
- Capital: Dublin
- Largest city: Dublin (1801–1901); Belfast (1901–1922)
- Common languages: English (official, administrative); Irish; Fingallian (until the mid-19th century); Yola (until the mid-19th century); Ulster Scots
- Religion: Anglicanism; Roman Catholic; Presbyterianism
- Demonym: Irish
- Government: Division of a constitutional monarchy
- Monarch
  - 1801–1820 (first): George III
  - 1910–1922 (last): George V
- Lord Lieutenant
  - 1801–1805 (first): Philip Yorke
  - 1922 (last): Edmund FitzAlan
- Historical era: Imperial Britain
  - Acts of Union came into effect: 1 January 1801
  - Easter Rising: 29 April 1916
  - Government of Ireland Act enacted: 3 May 1921
  - Anglo-Irish Treaty: 6 December 1921
  - Irish Free State established: 6 December 1922

Area
- 1911: 84,421 km^{2} (32,595 sq mi)

Population
  - 1911: 4,390,000
- Currency: Pound sterling; Irish pound (1801–1826)
Preceded by	Succeeded by
Kingdom of Ireland	Irish Free State; Northern Ireland
- Today part of: Republic of Ireland; United Kingdom; Northern Ireland

Ireland was part of the United Kingdom from 1801 to 1922. For almost all of this period, the island was governed by the UK Parliament in London through its Dublin Castle administration in Ireland. Ireland underwent considerable difficulties in the 19th century, especially the Great Famine of the 1840s which started a population decline that continued for almost a century. The late 19th and early 20th centuries saw a vigorous campaign for Irish Home Rule. While legislation enabling Irish Home Rule was eventually passed, militant and armed opposition from Irish unionists, particularly in Ulster, opposed it. Proclamation was shelved for the duration following the outbreak of World War I. By 1918, however, moderate Irish nationalism had been eclipsed by militant republican separatism. In 1919, war broke out between republican separatists and British Government forces. Subsequent negotiations between Sinn Féin, the major Irish party, and the UK government led to the signing of the Anglo-Irish Treaty, which resulted in five-sixths of the island seceding from the United Kingdom, becoming the Irish Free State (now the Republic of Ireland), with only the six northeastern counties remaining within the United Kingdom.

== Acts of Union, politics from 1801-1922 ==
Ireland opened the 19th century still reeling from the after-effects of the Irish Rebellion of 1798. Prisoners were still being deported to Australia and sporadic violence continued in County Wicklow. There was another abortive rebellion led by Robert Emmet in 1803. The Acts of Union, which constitutionally made Ireland part of the British state, can largely be seen as an attempt to redress some of the grievances behind the 1798 rising and to prevent it from destabilising Britain or providing a base for foreign invasion.

In 1800 the Irish Parliament and the Parliament of Great Britain each passed an Act of Union which, from 1 January 1801, abolished the Irish legislature and merged the Kingdom of Ireland and the Kingdom of Great Britain to create the United Kingdom of Great Britain and Ireland.

Flag of the United Kingdom of Great Britain and Ireland, 1801–1922. The Saint Patrick's Cross was added to the earlier Union Flag of Great Britain and counterchanged with the Saint Andrew's Cross to represent the inclusion of Ireland in the Union.

After one failed attempt, the passage of the act in the Irish parliament was finally achieved, albeit, as with the 1707 Acts of Union that united Scotland and England, with the mass bribery of members of both houses, who were awarded British peerages and other "encouragements".

In this period, the administration of Ireland consisted of authorities appointed by the central British government. These were the Lord Lieutenant of Ireland, who represented the King, and the Chief Secretary for Ireland appointed by the British Prime Minister. Almost equally important was the Under Secretary for Ireland, who headed up the civil service in Ireland.

As the century went on, the UK Parliament and Cabinet took over from the monarch as the legislative and executive branches of government, respectively. For this reason, in Ireland, the Chief Secretary became more important than the Lord Lieutenant, who became of more symbolic than real importance. After the abolition of the Irish Parliament, Irish Members of Parliament were elected to the House of Commons of the United Kingdom in Westminster.

The British Administration in Ireland – known by metonymy as "Dublin Castle" – remained largely dominated by the Anglo-Irish establishment until its removal from Dublin in 1922.

=== Catholic emancipation ===
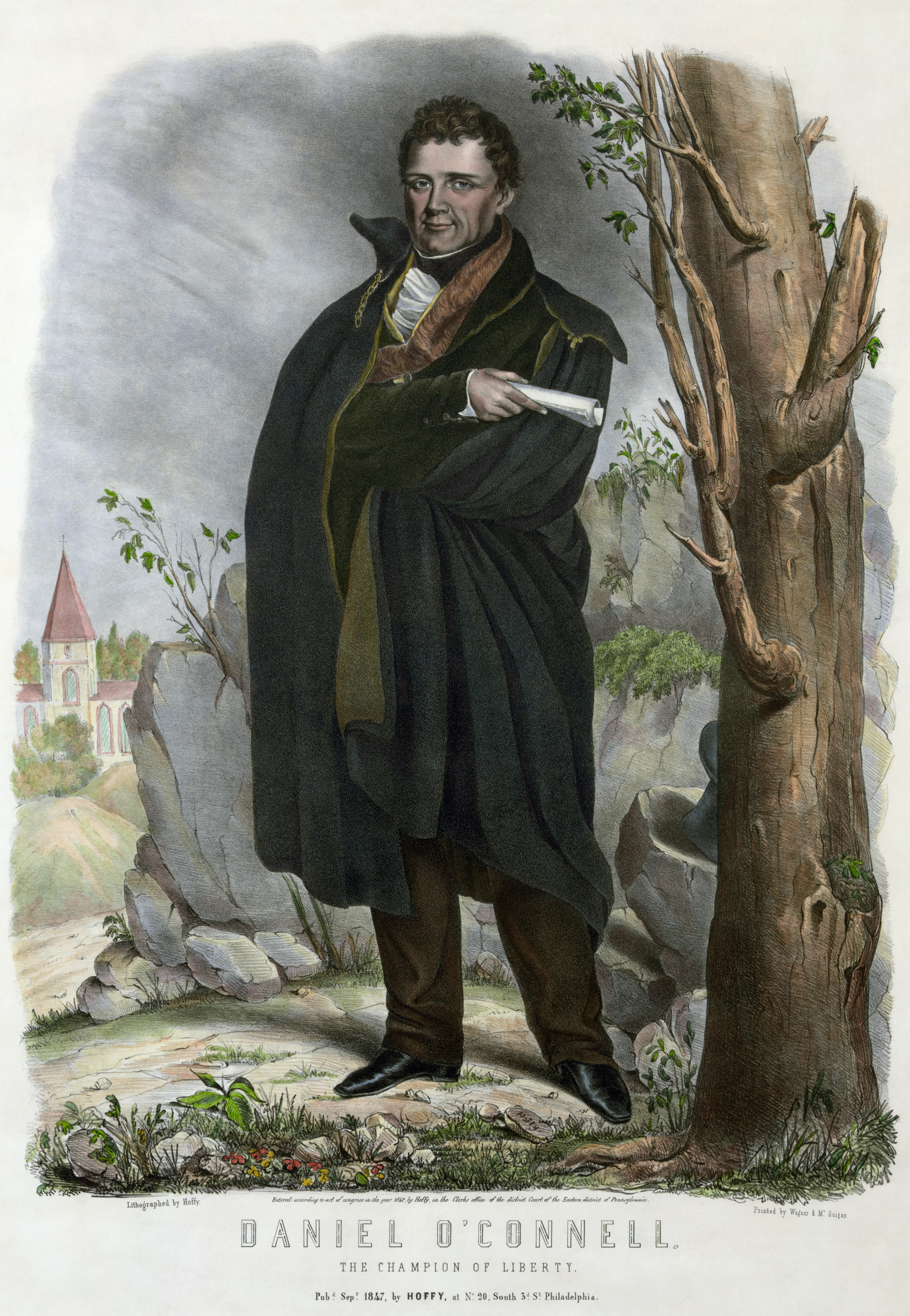
"Daniel O'Connell: The Champion of Liberty" poster published in Pennsylvania, 1847.

Part of the Union's attraction for many Irish Catholics and Dissenters was the promised abolition of the remaining Penal Laws then in force (which discriminated against them), and the granting of Catholic emancipation. However, George III blocked emancipation, believing that to grant it would break his coronation oath to defend the Anglican church. A campaign under the Irish Catholic lawyer and politician Daniel O'Connell and the Catholic Association led to renewed agitation for the abolition of the Test Act. Arthur Wellesley, 1st Duke of Wellington, an Anglo-Irish soldier and statesman, was at the peak of his prestige as the victor of the Napoleonic Wars. As Prime Minister he used his considerable political power and influence to steer the enabling legislation through the UK Parliament. He persuaded George IV to sign the Act into law under threat of resignation. The Roman Catholic Relief Act 1829, allowed British and Irish Catholics to sit in the Parliament. Daniel O'Connell became the first Catholic MP to be seated since 1689. As head of the Repeal Association, O'Connell mounted an unsuccessful campaign for the repeal of the Act of Union and the restoration of Irish self-government.

O'Connell's tactics were largely peaceful, using mass rallies to show the popular support for his campaign. While O'Connell failed to gain repeal of the Union, his efforts led to reforms in matters such as local government and the Poor Laws.

Despite O'Connell's peaceful methods, there was also a good deal of sporadic violence and rural unrest in the country in the first half of the 19th century. In Ulster, there were repeated outbreaks of sectarian violence, such as the riot at Dolly's Brae, between Catholics and the nascent Orange Order. Elsewhere, tensions between the rapidly growing rural population on one side and their landlords and the state on the other gave rise to much agrarian violence and social unrest. Secret peasant societies such as the Whiteboys and the Ribbonmen used sabotage and violence to intimidate landlords into better treatment of their tenants. The most sustained outbreak of violence was the Tithe War of the 1830s, over the obligation of the mostly Catholic peasantry to pay tithes to the Protestant Church of Ireland. The Royal Irish Constabulary (RIC) was set up to police rural areas in response to this violence.

=== Socioeconomic situation 1800–1840 ===
There were economic booms during the Napoleonic Wars (1803–15). Most people in pre-famine Ireland had little or no access to land. Landless laborers or cottiers comprised the single most common profession in the 1841 census, when 40% of Irish houses "were one room mud cabins with natural earth floors, no windows and no chimneys".

== The Great Famine, 1845–1851 ==
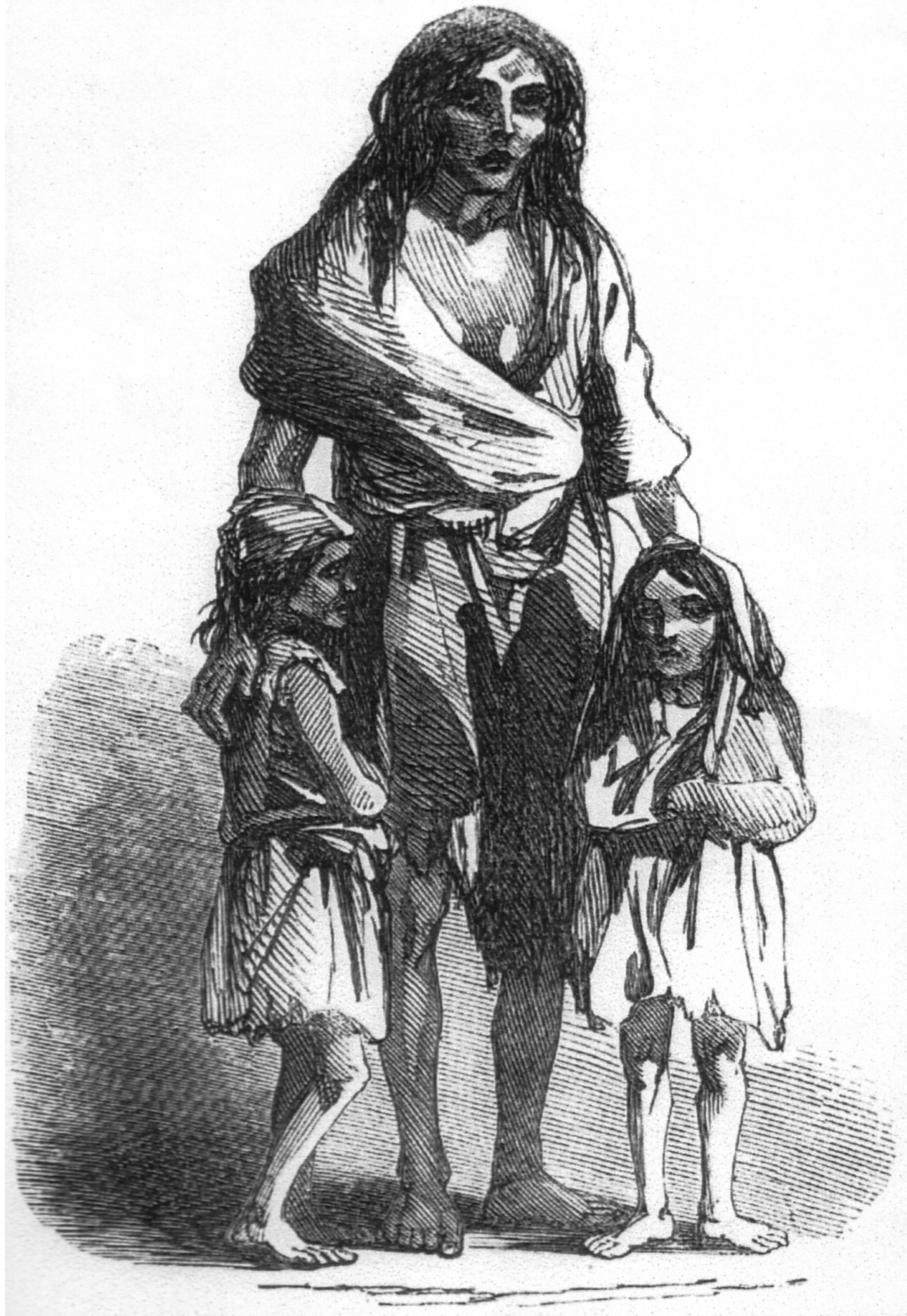
Starvation during the Famine-Bridget O'Donnell and two children, 1849

Ireland underwent major highs and lows economically during the 19th century; from economic booms during the Napoleonic Wars to severe economic downturns and a series of famines, the last threatening in 1879. The worst of these was the Great Irish Famine (1845–1851), in which about one million people died and another million emigrated.

The economic problems of most Irish people were in part the result of the small size of their landholdings and a large increase in the population in the years before the famine. In particular, both the law and social tradition provided for subdivision of land, with all sons inheriting equal shares in a farm, meaning that farms became so small that only one crop, potatoes, could be grown in sufficient amounts to feed a family. Furthermore, many estates, from whom the small farmers rented, were poorly run by absentee landlords and in many cases heavily mortgaged. Enclosures of land since the start of the 19th century had also exacerbated the problem, and the extensive grazing of cattle had contributed to the decrease in size in the plots of land available to tenants to raise their crops.

In the new Whig government (from 1846), Charles Trevelyan became assistant secretary to the Treasury, and largely responsible for the British Government's response to the famine in Ireland. When potato blight hit the island in 1845, much of the rural population was left without food. At this time, the Prime Minister Lord John Russell adhered to a strict laissez-faire economic policy it has been claimed, which maintained that further state intervention would have the whole country dependent on hand-outs, and that what was needed was for economic viability to be encouraged. The government of Lord John Russell attempted to raise a loan of £8 million and intended a further loan but this provoked a financial crisis made worse by demand for funds for railways and food imports. The crisis prevented the expending of the loan if the pound was to remain convertible to gold and government funding was slashed in 1847 and the costs of relief transferred to local taxes in Ireland.

Despite Ireland producing a net surplus of food, most of it was exported to England and elsewhere. Public works schemes were set up but proved inadequate, and the situation became catastrophic when epidemics of typhoid, cholera and dysentery took hold. About £2,000,000 was donated all over the world by charities and private donors, including the Choctaw people in the US, former slaves in the Caribbean, Sultan Abdülmecid I of the Ottoman Empire, Queen Victoria, and future Tsar Alexander II of Russia. However the inadequate nature of the British Government's initiatives led to a problem becoming a catastrophe.

Emigration was not uncommon in Ireland in the years preceding the Famine. Between 1815 and 1845, Ireland had already established itself as the major supplier of overseas labour to Great Britain and North America. However, emigration reached a peak during the famine, particularly in the years 1846–1855. The famine also saw increased emigration to Canada and assisted passages to Australia. Because of ongoing political tensions between the US and the UK, the resulting large and influential Irish American diaspora created, financed and encouraged the Irish independence movement. In 1858, the Irish Republican Brotherhood (IRB, also known as the Fenians) was founded as a secret society dedicated to armed rebellion against the British. A related organisation formed in New York was known as Clan na Gael, which several times organised raids into the British Province of Canada. While the Fenians had a considerable presence in rural Ireland, the Fenian Rising launched in 1867 was a fiasco. Moreover, wider support for Irish republicanism, in the face of harsh laws against sedition, was minimal in the period.

== Young Irelander Rebellion ==
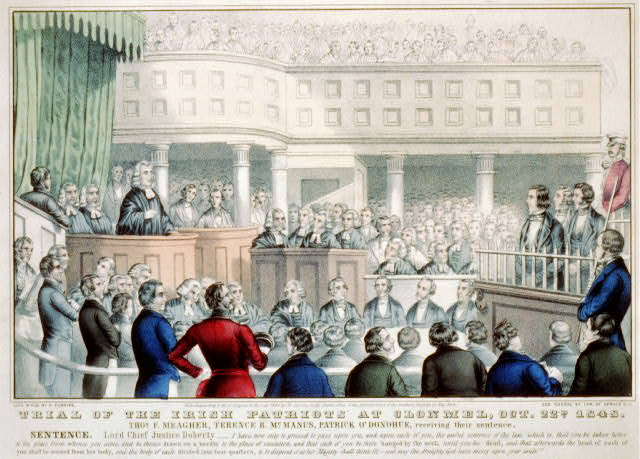
Trial of the Irish patriots at Clonmel. Thomas Francis Meagher, Terence MacManus, and Patrick O'Donoghue receiving their sentence of death.

Some members of the Repeal Association, called the Young Irelanders, formed the Irish Confederation and tried to launch a rebellion against British rule in 1848. This coincided with the worst years of the famine and was contained by British military action. William Smith O'Brien, leader of the Confederates, failed to capture a party of police barricaded in Widow McCormack's house, who were holding her children as hostages, marking the effective end of the revolt. Although intermittent resistance continued until late 1849, O'Brien and his colleagues were quickly arrested. Originally sentenced to death, this sentence was later commuted to transportation to Van Diemen's Land, where they joined John Mitchel.

== Land agitation and agrarian resurgence ==
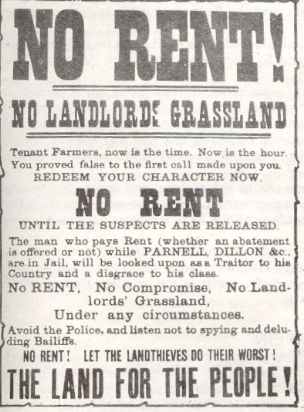
Irish Land League poster dating from the 1880s

In the wake of the famine, many thousands of Irish peasant farmers and labourers either died or left the country. Those who remained waged a long campaign for better rights for tenant farmers and ultimately for land re-distribution. This period, known as the "Land War" in Ireland, had a nationalist as well as a social element. The reason for this was that the land-owning class in Ireland, since the period of the 17th century Plantations of Ireland, had been composed of Protestant settlers, originally from England, who had a British identity. The Irish (Roman Catholic) population widely believed that the land had been unjustly taken from their ancestors and given to this Protestant Ascendancy during the English conquest of the country.

The Irish National Land League, was formed to defend the interests of tenant farmers, at first demanding the "Three Fs" – Fair rent, Free sale and Fixity of tenure. Members of the Irish Republican Brotherhood, such as Michael Davitt, were prominent among the leadership of this movement. When they saw its potential for popular mobilisation, nationalist leaders such as Charles Stewart Parnell also became involved.

Irish settlement in Britain as of 1851

The most effective tactic of the Land League was the boycott (the word originates in Ireland in this period), where unpopular landlords were ostracised by the local community. Grassroots Land League members used violence against landlords and their property; attempted evictions of tenant farmers regularly turned into armed confrontations. Under the British Prime Minister Benjamin Disraeli, an Irish Coercion Act was first introduced – a form of martial law – to contain the violence. Parnell, Davitt, William O'Brien and the other leaders of the Land League were temporarily imprisoned – being held responsible for the violence.

Ultimately, the land question was settled through successive Irish Land Acts by the United Kingdom – beginning with the Landlord and Tenant (Ireland) Act 1870 and the Land Law (Ireland) Act 1881 of William Ewart Gladstone, which first gave extensive rights to tenant farmers, then the Wyndham Land Purchase (Ireland) Act 1903 won by William O'Brien after the 1902 Land Conference, enabling tenant farmers purchase their plots of land from their landlords, the problems of non-existent rural housing resolved by D. D. Sheehan under the Bryce Labourers (Ireland) Act (1906). These acts created a very large class of small property owners in the Irish countryside, and dissipated the power of the old Anglo-Irish landed class. The 1908 J. J. Clancy Town Housing Act then advanced the building of urban council housing.

Unrest and agitation also resulted in the successful introduction of agricultural co-operatives through the initiative of Horace Plunkett, but the most positive changes came after the introduction of the Local Government (Ireland) Act 1898 which put the control and running of rural affairs into local hands. However, it did not end support for independent Irish nationalism, as British Governments had hoped. After Independence, Irish governments from 1923 completed a final land settlement under Free State Land Acts. See also Irish Land Commission.

== Culture and the Gaelic revival ==
The Culture of Ireland underwent a massive change in the course of the 19th century. After the Famine, the Irish language went into steep decline. This process was started in the 1830s, when the first National Schools were set up in the country. These had the advantage of encouraging literacy, but classes were provided only in English and the speaking of Irish was prohibited. However, before the 1840s, Irish was still the majority language in the country and numerically (given the rise in population) may have had more speakers than ever before. The Famine devastated the Irish speaking areas of the country, which tended also to be rural and poor. As well as causing the deaths of thousands of Irish speakers, the famine also led to sustained and widespread emigration from the Irish-speaking south and west of the country. By 1900, for the first time in perhaps two millennia, Irish was no longer the majority language in Ireland, and continued to decline in importance. By the time of Irish independence, the Gaeltachts had shrunk to small areas along the western seaboard.

In reaction to this, Irish nationalists began a Gaelic revival in the late 19th century, hoping to revive the Irish language and Irish literature and sports. While social organizations such as the Gaelic League and the Gaelic Athletic Association were very successful in attracting members, most of their activists were English speakers and the movement did not halt the decline of the Irish language.

The form of English established in Ireland differed somewhat from British English and its variants. Blurring linguistic structures from older forms of English (notably Elizabethan English) and the Irish language, it is known as Hiberno-English and was strongly associated with early 20th century Celtic Revival and Irish writers like J.M. Synge, George Bernard Shaw, Seán O'Casey, and had resonances in the English of Dubliner Oscar Wilde. Some nationalists saw the celebration of Hiberno-Irish by predominantly Anglo-Irish writers as offensive "stage Irish" caricature. Synge's play The Playboy of the Western World was marked by rioting at performances.

== Home Rule movement ==
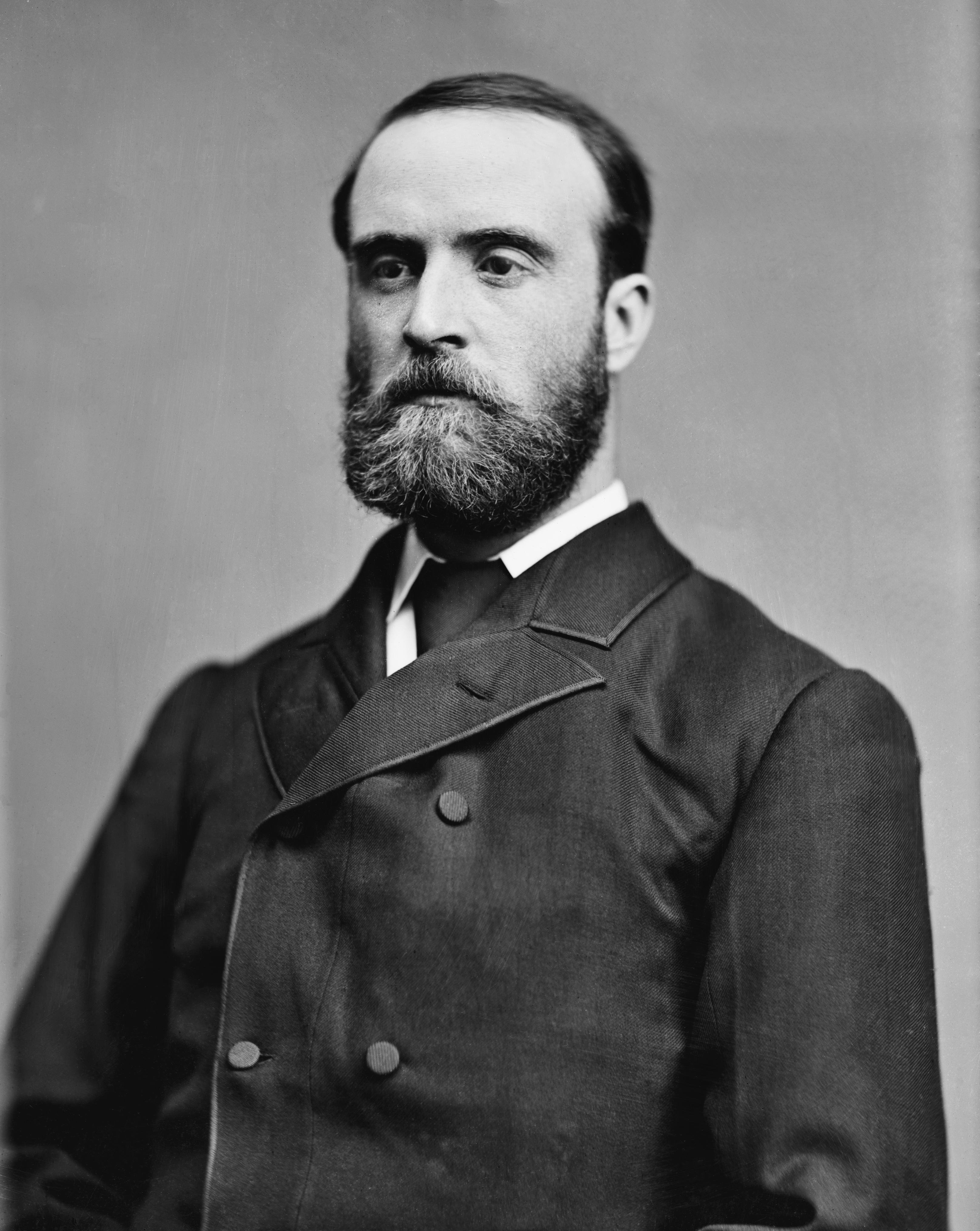
Charles Stewart Parnell, the "uncrowned King of Ireland"

Until the 1870s, most Irish people elected as their Members of Parliament (MPs) Liberals and Conservatives who belonged to the main British political parties. The Conservatives, for example, won a majority in the 1859 general election in Ireland. A significant minority also voted for Unionists, who resisted fiercely any dilution of the Act of Union. In the 1870s a former Conservative barrister turned nationalist campaigner, Isaac Butt, established a new moderate nationalist movement, the Home Rule League. After his death, William Shaw and in particular a radical young Protestant landowner, Charles Stewart Parnell, turned the home rule movement, or the Irish Parliamentary Party (IPP) as it became known, into a major political force. It came to dominate Irish politics, to the exclusion of the previous Liberal, Conservative and Unionist parties that had existed there. The party's growing electoral strength was first shown in the 1880 general election in Ireland, when it won 63 seats (two MPs later defected to the Liberals). By the 1885 general election in Ireland it had won 86 seats (including one in the heavily Irish-populated English city of Liverpool). Parnell's movement proved to be a broad one, from conservative landowners to the Land League.

Parnell's movement also campaigned for the right of Ireland to govern herself as a region within the United Kingdom, in contrast to O'Connell who had wanted a complete repeal of the Act of Union. Two home rule bills (in 1886 and 1893) were introduced by Liberal Prime Minister William Gladstone, but neither became law. Gladstone, says his biographer, "totally rejected the widespread English view that the Irish had no taste for justice, common sense, moderation or national prosperity and looked only to perpetual strife and dissension." The problem for Gladstone was his rural supporters in England would not support home rule for Ireland. A large faction of Liberals, led by Joseph Chamberlain, formed a Unionist faction that supported the Conservative party. The Liberals were out of power and home rule proposals languished.

Home Rule divided Ireland: a significant minority of Unionists (largely based in Ulster) were opposed. The revived Orange Order mobilized the opposition, warning that a Dublin parliament dominated by Catholics and nationalists would discriminate against them and would impose tariffs on trade with Great Britain. (Whilst most of Ireland was primarily agricultural, north-east Ulster was the location of almost all the island's heavy industry and would have been affected by any tariff barriers imposed by a Dublin parliament.) Intense rioting broke out in Belfast in 1886, as the first Home Rule Bill was being debated.

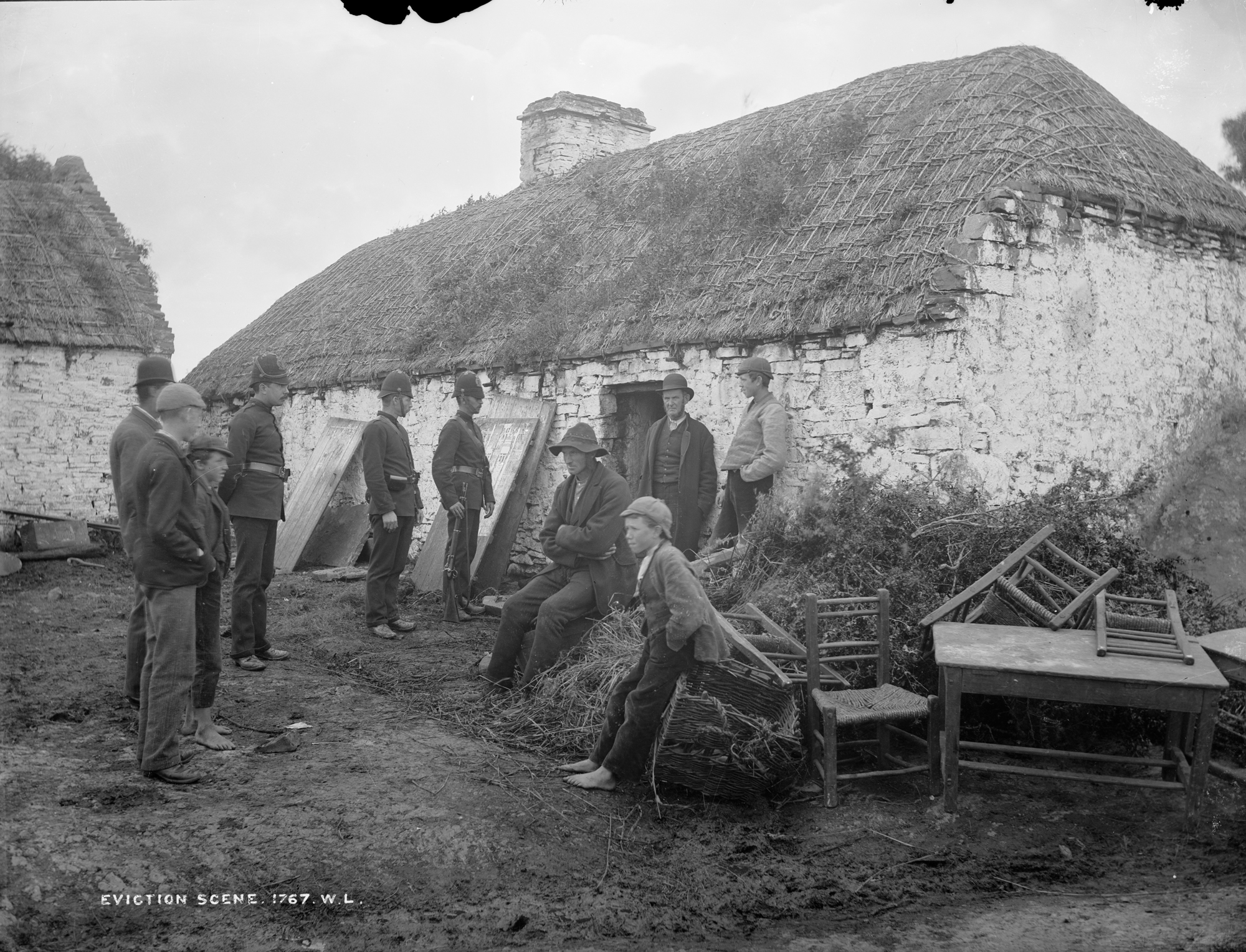
Forced eviction of Irish tenant in County Clare, second half of the 19th century

In 1889, the scandal surrounding Parnell's divorce proceedings split the Irish party, when it became public that Parnell, popularly acclaimed as the 'Uncrowned King of Ireland', had for many years been living in a family relationship with Mrs. Katharine O'Shea, the long-separated wife of a fellow MP. When the scandal broke, religious non-conformists in Great Britain, who were the backbone of the pro-Home Rule Liberal Party, forced its leader W. E. Gladstone to abandon support for the Irish cause as long as Parnell remained leader of the IPP. Inside Ireland, the Catholic Church turned against him. Parnell fought for control but lost. He died in 1891. But the Party and the country remained split between pro-Parnellites and anti-Parnellites, who fought each other in elections.

The United Irish League founded in 1898 forced the reunification of the party to stand under John Redmond in the 1900 general election. After a brief attempt by the Irish Reform Association to introduce devolution in 1904, the Irish Party subsequently held the balance of power in the House of Commons after the 1910 general election.

The last obstacle to achieving Home Rule was removed with the Parliament Act 1911 when the House of Lords lost its power to veto legislation and could only delay a bill for two years. In 1912, with the Irish Parliamentary Party at its zenith, a new third Home Rule Bill was introduced by Prime Minister H. H. Asquith, passing its first reading in the Imperial House of Commons but again defeated in the House of Lords (as with the bill of 1893). During the following two years in which the bill was delayed, debates in the Commons were largely dominated by questions surrounding Home Rule and Ulster Unionists' determined resistance to it. By 1914 the situation had escalated into militancy on both sides, first unionists then nationalists arming and drilling openly, bringing about a Home Rule crisis.

== Labour conflicts ==
Although nationalism dominated Irish politics, social and economic issues were far from absent and came to the fore in the first two decades of the 20th century. Dublin was a city marked by extremes of poverty and wealth, being home to several tenement areas and possessing some of the worst slums anywhere in the British Empire. It also possessed one of the world's biggest "red light districts" known as Monto (after its focal point, Montgomery Street, on the north side of the city).

Unemployment was high in Ireland and worker's pay and conditions were often very poor. In response to this, socialist activists such as James Larkin and James Connolly began to organize Trade Unions on syndicalist principles.

In 1907, Belfast saw a bitter strike (by dockers organized by Larkin), in which 10,000 workers went on strike and the police mutinied – a rare instance of non-sectarian mobilization in Ulster. In Dublin, there was an even more vicious dispute – the Dublin Lockout of 1913 – in which over 20,000 workers were fired for belonging to Larkin's Union. Three people died in the rioting that accompanied the lock-out and many more were injured.

However, the labor movement was split into nationalist lines. Southern unions formed the Irish Trades Union Congress whereas those in Ulster affiliated themselves to British unions. Mainstream Irish nationalists were deeply opposed to social radicalism but socialist and labor activists found some sympathy among more extreme Irish Republicans. James Connolly founded the Irish Citizen Army to defend strikers from the police in 1913. In 1916 it participated in the Easter Rising alongside the Irish Republican Brotherhood and part of the Irish Volunteers.

== Home Rule crisis ==
Since early 1914, Ireland seemed to be on the brink of civil war between rival private armies, the Nationalist and Unionist Volunteer groups, over the proposed introduction of Home Rule for Ireland.

Already in April 1912, 100,000 unionists, led by the barrister Sir Edward Carson founded the Ulster Volunteers to resist Home Rule. September saw Carson and James Craig organize the "Ulster Covenant", with over 470,000 signatories pledging to resist Home Rule. This movement then formed the Ulster Volunteer Force (UVF) in January 1913. In April 1914 30,000 German rifles with 3,000,000 rounds were landed at Larne, with the authorities blockaded by the UVF (see Larne gunrunning). The Curragh Incident showed it would be difficult to use the British Army to coerce Ulster into home rule from Dublin. In response, Irish nationalists created the Irish Volunteers, part of which later became the forerunner of the Irish Republican Army (IRA) – to seek to ensure the passing of Home Rule, arming themselves following the Howth gun-running.

In September 1914, just as the First World War broke out, the UK Parliament finally passed the Government of Ireland Act 1914 to establish self-government for Ireland, condemned by the dissident nationalists' All-for-Ireland League party as a "partition deal". The Act was suspended for the duration of the war, expected to last only a year. In order to ensure the implementation of Home Rule after the war, nationalist leaders and the Irish Parliamentary Party under Redmond supported Ireland's participation with the British war effort and Allied cause under the Triple Entente against the expansion of the Central Powers. The UVF and a majority of the Irish Volunteers who split off to form the National Volunteers joined in their thousands their respective Irish regiments of the New British Army. A significant section of the Irish Volunteers bitterly disagreed with the National Volunteers serving with the Irish Divisions.

The 10th (Irish) Division, the 16th (Irish) Division and the 36th (Ulster) Division suffered crippling losses in the trenches on the Western Front, in Gallipoli and the Middle East. Between 35,000 and 50,000 Irishmen (in all armies) are believed to have died in the War. Each side believed that, after the war, Great Britain would favour their respective goals of remaining fully part of the United Kingdom or becoming a self-governing United Ireland within the union with the United Kingdom. Before the war ended, Britain made two concerted efforts to implement Home Rule, one in May 1916 after the Easter Rising and again during 1917–1918, but during the Irish Convention the Irish sides (Nationalist, Unionist) were unable to agree on terms for the temporary or permanent exclusion of Ulster from its provisions. However, the combination of postponement of Home Rule and the involvement of Ireland with Great Britain in the war ("England's difficulty is Ireland's opportunity" as an old Republican saying went) provoked some on the radical fringes of Irish nationalism to resort to physical force.

Until 1918, the Irish Parliamentary Party, which sought independent self-government for the whole of Ireland through the principles of parliamentary constitutionalism, remained the dominant Irish party. But from the early 20th century, a radical fringe among Home Rulers became associated with militant republicanism, particularly Irish-American republicanism. It was from the former Irish Volunteer ranks that the Irish Republican Brotherhood organized an armed rebellion in 1916.

== Easter Rising ==
The flag of the Irish Republic, flown over the GPO during the Easter Rising.

Because of divisions among the Volunteer leadership, only a small part of their numbers was mobilized. Indeed, Eoin MacNeill, the Volunteer commander, countermanded orders to units to begin the insurrection. Nevertheless, at Easter 1916, a small band of 1500 republican rebels (Volunteers and Irish Citizen Army) staged a rebellion, called the "Easter Rising" in Dublin, under Padraig Pearse and James Connolly. The Rising was put down after a week's fighting. Initially, their acts were widely condemned by nationalists, who had suffered severe losses in the war as their sons fought at Gallipoli during the Landing at Cape Helles, and on the Western Front. Major newspapers such as the Irish Independent and local authorities openly called for the execution of Pearse and the Rising's leadership. However, the government's handling of the aftermath, and the execution of rebels and others in stages, ultimately led to widespread public sympathy for the rebels.

The government and the Irish media wrongly blamed Sinn Féin, then a small monarchist political party with little popular support for the rebellion, even though in reality it had not been involved. Nonetheless, Rising survivors, notably Éamon de Valera returning from imprisonment in Great Britain, joined the party in great numbers, radicalized its programme and took control of its leadership.

Until 1917, Sinn Féin, under its founder Arthur Griffith, had campaigned for a form of government championed first by O'Connell, namely that Ireland would become independent as a dual monarchy with Great Britain, under a shared king. Such a system operated under Austria-Hungary, where the same monarch, Emperor Charles I, reigned separately in both Austria and Hungary. Indeed, Griffith in his book, The Resurrection of Hungary, modeled his ideas on the manner in which Hungary had forced Austria to create a dual monarchy linking both states.

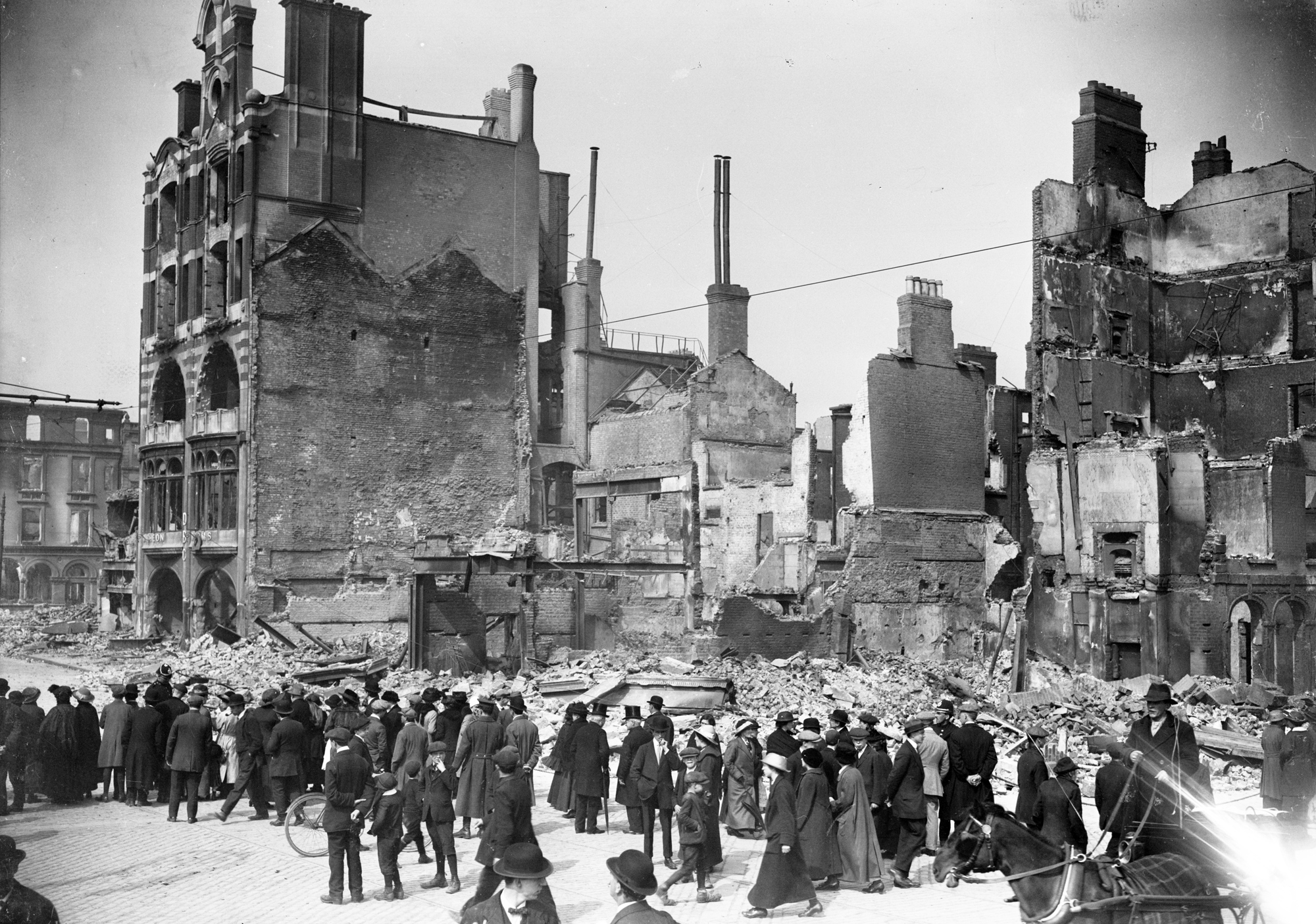
O'Connell Street, Dublin after the Rising, 1916

Faced with an impending split between its monarchists and Republicans, a compromise was brokered at the 1917 Ard Fheis (party conference) whereby the party would campaign to create a republic, then let the people decide if they wanted a monarchy or republic, subject to the proviso that if they wanted a king, they could not choose someone from Britain's Royal Family.

Throughout 1917 and 1918, Sinn Féin and the Irish Parliamentary Party fought a bitter electoral battle; each won some by-elections and lost others. The scales were finally tipped in Sinn Féin's favor when as a result of the German spring offensive the government, although it had already received large numbers of volunteer soldiers from Ireland, intended to impose conscription on the island linked with implementing Home Rule. An infuriated public turned against Britain during the Conscription Crisis of 1918. The Irish Parliamentary Party demonstratively withdrew its MPs from the House of Commons at Westminster.

In the December 1918 general election, Sinn Féin won 73 out of 105 seats, 25 of which were uncontested. Sinn Féin's new MPs refused to sit in the British House of Commons. Instead on 21 January 1919 twenty-seven assembled as Teachta Dála (TDs) in the Mansion House in Dublin and established Dáil Éireann (a revolutionary Irish parliament). They proclaimed an Irish Republic and attempted to establish a unilateral system of government.

== War of Independence ==
The tricolour was adopted as the national flag of Ireland in 1919, when the Irish Republic was established by the First Dáil. It had been in use by the independence movement since its introduction in the middle of the 19th century by the Young Irelanders.

For three years, from 1919 to 1921, acting largely on its own authority and independently of the Dáil assembly, the Irish Republican Army (IRA), the army of the Irish Republic, engaged in guerrilla warfare against the British Army and paramilitary police units known as the Black and Tans and the Auxiliary Division. Both sides engaged in brutal acts; the Black and Tans deliberately burned entire towns and tortured civilians. The IRA killed many civilians it believed to be aiding or giving information to the British (particularly in Munster). Royal Irish Constabulary (RIC) records later revealed the targeted Protestants unionists to have been non-collaborative and very tight-lipped. The IRA also burned historic stately homes in retaliation for the government policy of destroying the homes of Republicans, suspected or actual. This clash came to be known as the War of Independence or the Anglo-Irish War. It reinforced the fears of Ulster Unionists that they could never expect safeguards from an all-Ireland Sinn Féin government in Dublin.

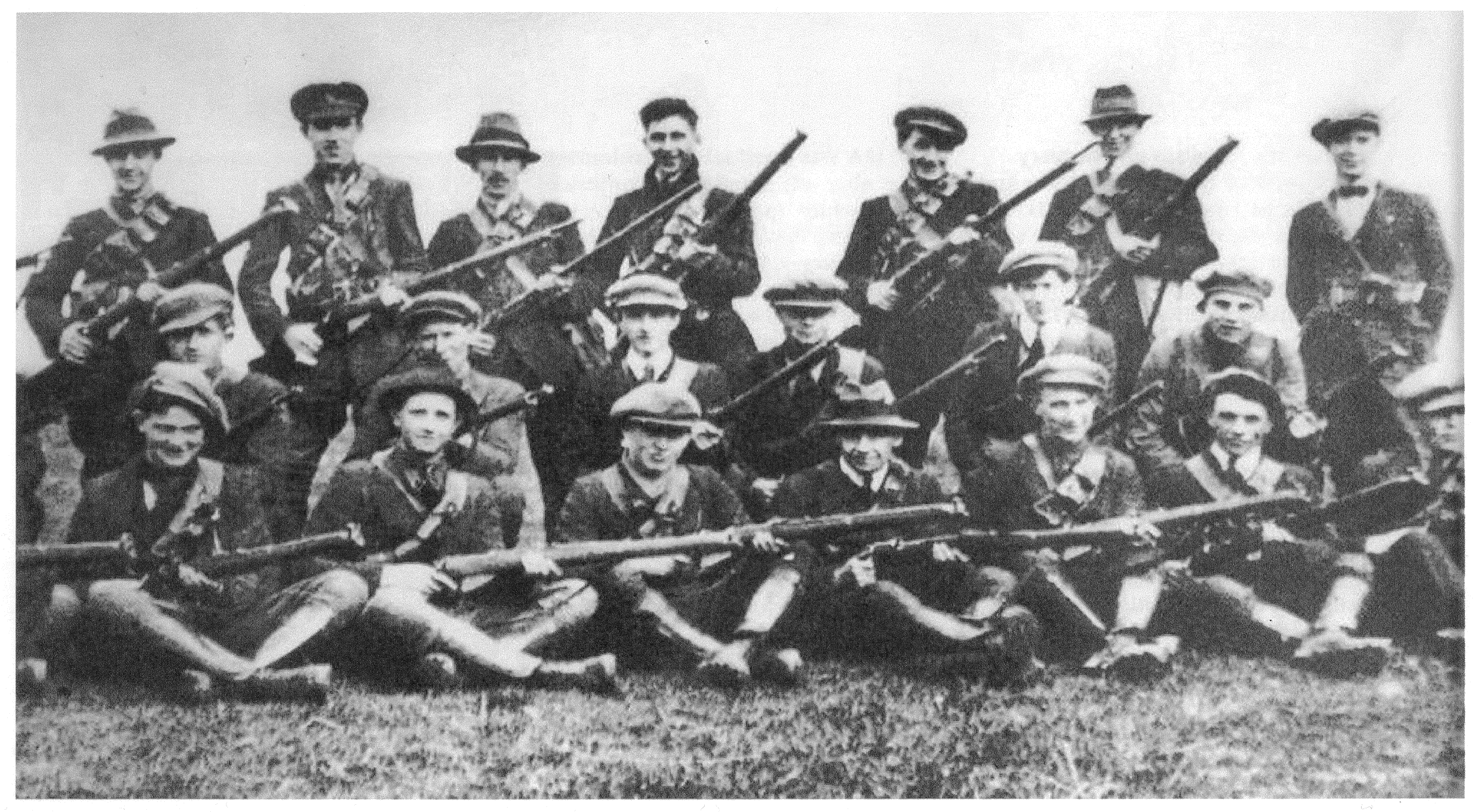
The No. 2 Third Tipperary Brigade Flying Column during the War of Independence.

In the background, Britain remained committed to implementing self-government for Ireland in accordance with the (temporarily suspended) Home Rule Act 1914. The British Cabinet drew up a committee to deal with this, the Long Committee. This largely followed Unionist MP recommendations, since Dáil MPs boycotting Westminster had no say or input. These deliberations resulted in a new Fourth Home Rule Act (known as the Government of Ireland Act 1920) being enacted primarily in the interest of Ulster Unionists. The Act granted (separate) Home Rule to two new institutions, the northeasternmost six counties of Ulster and the remaining twenty-six counties, both territories within the United Kingdom, which partitioned Ireland accordingly into two semi-autonomous regions: Northern Ireland and Southern Ireland, coordinated by a Council of Ireland. Upon Royal Assent, the Parliament of Northern Ireland came into being in 1921. The institutions of Southern Ireland, however, were boycotted by nationalists and so never became functional.

In July 1921, a cease-fire was agreed and negotiations between delegations of the Irish and British sides produced the Anglo-Irish Treaty. Under the treaty, southern and western Ireland was to be given a form of dominion status, modeled on the Dominion of Canada. This was more than what was initially offered to Parnell, and somewhat more than had been achieved under the Irish Parliamentary Party's constitutional 'step by step' towards full freedom approach.

Northern Ireland was given the right, immediately availed of, to opt out of the new Irish Free State, and an Irish Boundary Commission was to be established to work out the final details of the border. In December 1925 the three governments agreed to keep the existing border, and in return, the Irish Free State's treaty liability to pay its share of the UK public debt was ended.

== Civil War ==
The Second Dáil ratified the Anglo-Irish Treaty by a vote of 64 to 57 in January 1922. Under the leadership of Michael Collins and W. T. Cosgrave, it set about establishing the Irish Free State via the transitional Provisional Government of the Irish Free State. The pro-Treaty IRA became part of a fully re-organised new National Army and a new police force, the Civic Guard (quickly renamed as the Garda Síochána), replacing one of Ireland's two police forces, the Royal Irish Constabulary. The second, the Dublin Metropolitan Police, merged some years later with the Gardaí.

However a strong Republican minority group led by Éamon de Valera opposed the treaty on the grounds that:

- it had abolished the Irish Republic proclaimed in 1916, established under the First Dáil,
- it imposed the controversial Dominion Oath of Allegiance (to the Irish Free State) and Fidelity (to the King) on Irish parliamentarians, and
- it accepted the partition of the island and failed to create a fully independent republic.

De Valera led his supporters out of the Dáil and, after a lapse of six months in which the IRA also split, a bloody civil war between pro- and anti-treaty sides followed, only coming to an end in 1923 accompanied by multiple executions. The civil war cost more lives than the Anglo-Irish War that preceded it and left divisions that are still felt strongly in Irish politics today.

== See also ==
- Ireland–United Kingdom relations
- Republic of Ireland–United Kingdom border
- History of Ireland
- History of the United Kingdom
- Timeline of Irish history
- History of the Republic of Ireland
- History of Northern Ireland
- Act of Union 1800
- Great Irish Famine (1845–1849)
