= History of the British national debt =

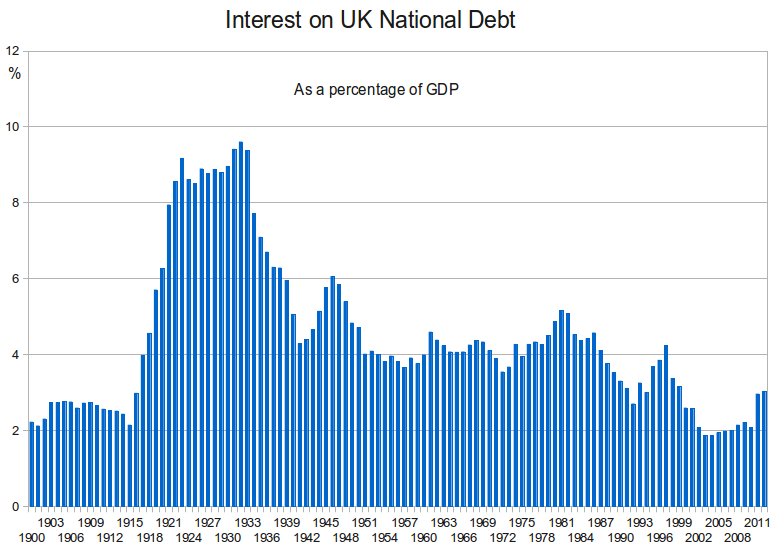
Interest payments on UK national debt as percentage of GDP from 1900 to 2011

The history of the British national debt can be traced back to the reign of William III, who engaged a syndicate of City traders and merchants to offer for an issue of government debt, which evolved into the Bank of England. In 1815, at the end of the Napoleonic Wars, British government debt reached a peak of £1 billion (that was more than 200% of GDP).

By the beginning of the 20th century the national debt had been gradually reduced to around 30 percent of GDP. However, during World War I, the British government was forced to borrow heavily in order to finance the war effort. The national debt increased from £650m in 1914 to £7.7 billion in 1919. During World War II the government was again forced to borrow heavily in order to finance war with the Axis powers. After the war the debt gradually decreased as a proportion of GDP, but in the 1970s, following a Sterling crisis, the British government was forced to seek help from the International Monetary Fund (IMF).

As the 1980s and 1990s progressed, the proportion of debt to GDP fluctuated up and down according to how the wider economy was performing, remaining relatively constant during the early 1980s recession, falling in the latter half of the decade, and rising again as the early 1990s recession reduced tax receipts. In the late 1990s and early 2000s the national debt again dropped in relative terms, falling to 29% of GDP by 2002. After that it began to increase, despite sustained economic growth, as the Labour government led by Tony Blair increased public expenditure. By 2007 the national debt had increased to 37% of GDP. The deficit continued to grow and, following the Great Recession beginning in early 2008, both government borrowing and the national debt have risen dramatically, reaching around 70% of GDP by the end of 2012.

== Origins ==
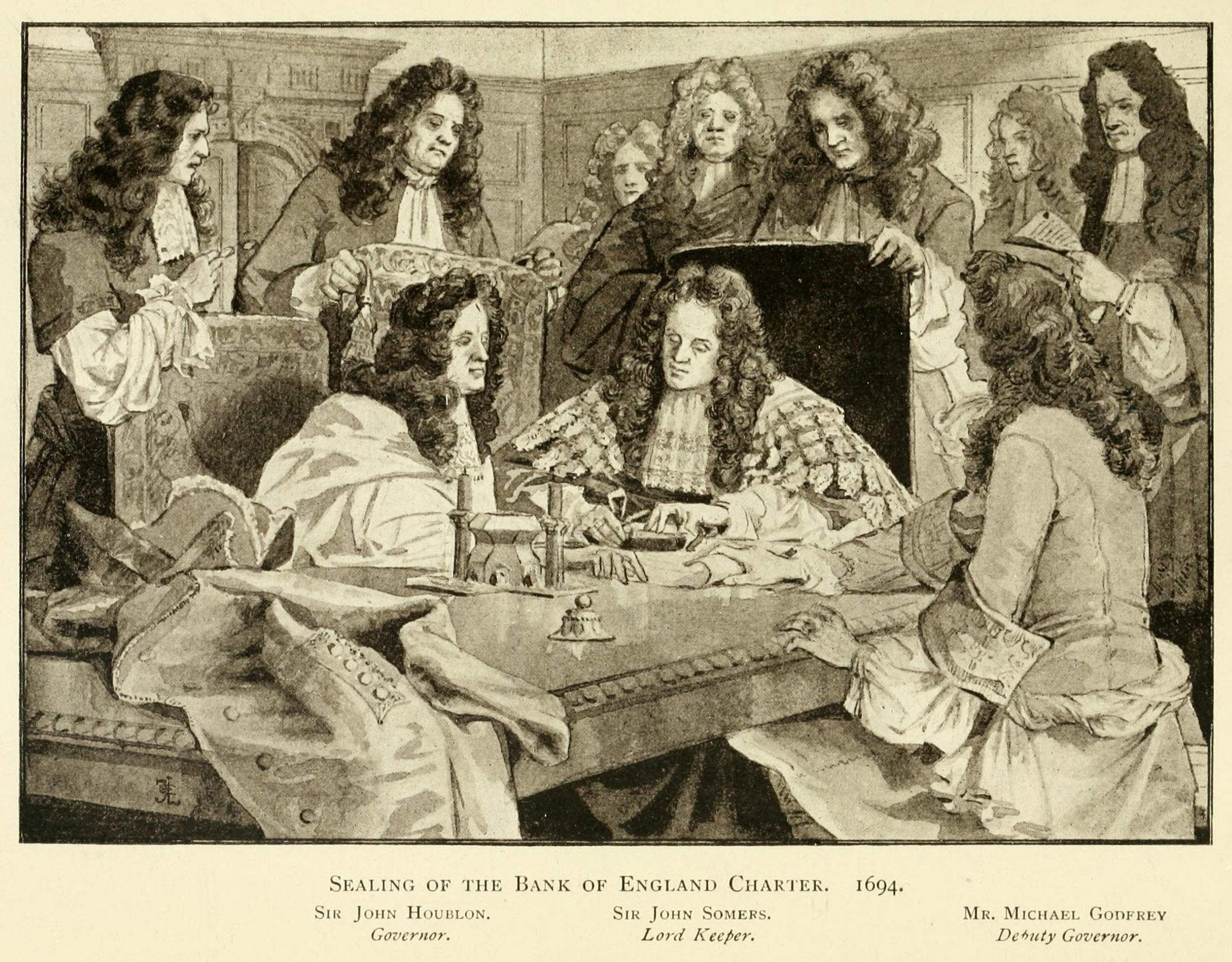
The sealing of the Bank of England Charter (1694)

The origins of the British national debt can be found during the reign of William III, who engaged a syndicate of City traders and merchants to offer for sale an issue of government debt. This syndicate soon evolved into the Bank of England, eventually financing the military campaigns of the Duke of Marlborough and later imperial conquests.

The establishment of the bank was devised by Charles Montagu, in 1694, to the plan which had been proposed by William Paterson three years before, but had not been acted upon. He proposed a loan of £1.2m to the government; in return the subscribers would be incorporated as The Governor and Company of the Bank of England with long-term banking privileges including the issue of notes. The royal charter was granted on 27 July through the passage of the Tonnage Act 1694.

Public finances were in so dire a condition at the time that the terms of the loan were that it was to be serviced at a rate of 8% per annum, and there was also a service charge of £4,000 per annum for the management of the loan. The first governor was Sir John Houblon, who is depicted in the £50 note issued in 1994. The charter was renewed in 1742, 1764, and 1781.

The founding of the Bank of England put an end to defaults such as the Great Stop of the Exchequer of 1672, when Charles II had suspended payments on his bills. The British government would not default again until 1934 when it failed to keep up repayments on its WWI debt to the USA. About 3/7 of British national debt in 1776, and 1/3 of major stocks like the East India Company, were held by Dutch bankers.

In 1815, at the end of the Napoleonic Wars, British government debt reached a peak of £1 billion (that was more than 200% of GDP).

== The South Sea Company ==
The Lord Treasurer Robert Harley established the South Sea Company in 1711. Nominally, this was a trading company, but its main activity was the funding of government debt. In 1720, a bill was passed making the South Sea Company responsible for the entire national debt. This led to a frenzy of interest in the company, whose shares reached ten times their original issue price. A liquidity problem and collapse followed. The company was responsible for at least part of the national debt until it was abolished in 1850.

== World War I ==
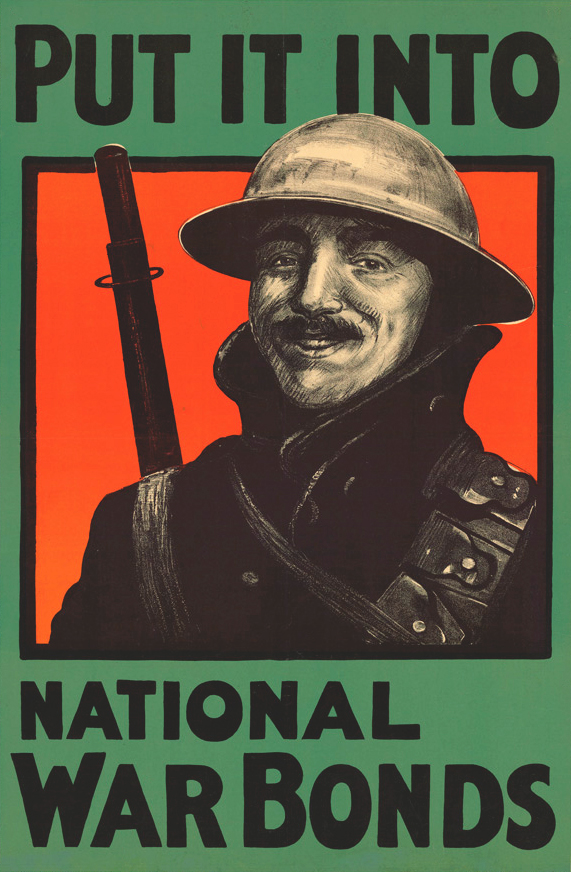
British national war bond advertisement

At the beginning of the 20th century the national debt stood at around 30 percent of GDP. However, during World War I the British government was forced to borrow heavily in order to finance the war effort. The national debt increased from £650 million in 1914 to £7.7 billion in 1919.

Britain borrowed heavily from the US during World War I, and many loans from this period remain in a curious state of limbo. In 1931, President Herbert Hoover announced a one-year moratorium on war loan repayments from all nations, due to the global economic crisis, but by 1934 Britain still owed the US$4.4bn of World War I debt (about £866m at 1934 exchange rates). During the Great Depression Britain ceased payments on these loans, and they remain outstanding.

=== Between the wars ===
By the mid-1920s, interest on government debt was absorbing 44% of all government expenditure, comfortably exceeding spending on defence until 1937 when, as war clouds drew near, re-armament began to get underway in earnest.

== World War II ==
During World War II the government was again forced to borrow heavily in order to finance war with the Axis powers. By the end of the conflict Britain's debt exceeded 200 percent of GDP, as it had done after the end of the Napoleonic Wars. As during World War I, the US again provided the major source of funds, this time via low-interest loans and also through the Lend Lease Act. At the end of the war Britain Lend Lease was ended but Britain needed to continue to make payments for Lend Lease and import food but with industrial production turned over to wartime needs there was little export sales to cover the costs. In 1946 Britain took a loan for $586 million (about £145 million at 1945 exchange rates), and in addition a further $3.7 billion line of credit (about £930m at 1945 exchange rates). To the total loan of $US3.75bn, Canada contributed another US$1.19 bn, both at the rate of 2% annual interest. The debt was to be paid off in 50 annual repayments commencing in 1950. Some of these loans were only paid off in the early 21st century. On 31 December 2006, Britain made a final payments of about $83m (£45.5m) to the US and about $23.6m to Canada.

By the end of World War II Britain had amassed an immense debt of £21 billion. Much of this was held in foreign hands, with around £3.4 billion being owed overseas (mainly to creditors in the United States), a sum which represented around one third of annual GDP.

== 1970s ==
After the war the debt gradually fell as a proportion of GDP, but in 1976 the British government led by James Callaghan faced a Sterling crisis during which the value of the pound tumbled and the government found it difficult to raise sufficient funds to maintain its spending commitments. The prime minister was forced to apply to the International Monetary Fund for a £2.3 billion rescue package; the largest-ever call on IMF resources up to that point. In November 1976 the IMF announced its conditions for a loan, including deep cuts in public expenditure, in effect taking control of UK domestic policy. The crisis was considered by much of the press as a national humiliation, with Chancellor Denis Healey being forced to go "cap in hand" to the IMF.

== 2000s ==
UK national debt as a percentage of GDP, 1993–2023

In the late 1990s and early 2000s the national debt dropped in relative terms, falling to 29% of GDP by 2002. After that it began to increase, despite sustained economic growth, increasing to 37% of GDP in 2007. This was due to extra government borrowing, largely caused by increased spending on health, education, and social security benefits. Since 2008, when the British economy slowed sharply during the Great Recession, the national debt has risen dramatically, initially from the vast sums needed for bank bailouts, and then by the rapidly declining receipts from taxation on personal income and on businesses.

In the 20-year period from 1986/87 to 2006/07 government spending in the United Kingdom averaged around 40% of GDP. As a result of the 2008 financial crisis and the Great Recession, government spending increased to a historically high level of 48% of GDP in 2009–10, partly as a result of the cost of a series of bank bailouts. In July 2007, Britain had government debt at 35.5% of GDP. This figure rose to 56.8% of GDP by July 2009.

As of June 2023 the British national debt sits at 100.1% of GDP. Public sector net debt at the end of May 2023 was £2,567.2 billion.

== See also ==
- Public Sector Net Cash Requirement
- United Kingdom national debt
- Whole of Government Accounts
