= Stop of the Exchequer =

Repudiation of state debt in England in 1672

The Great Stop of the Exchequer or Stop of the Exchequer was a repudiation of state debt that occurred in England in 1672 under the reign of Charles II of England.

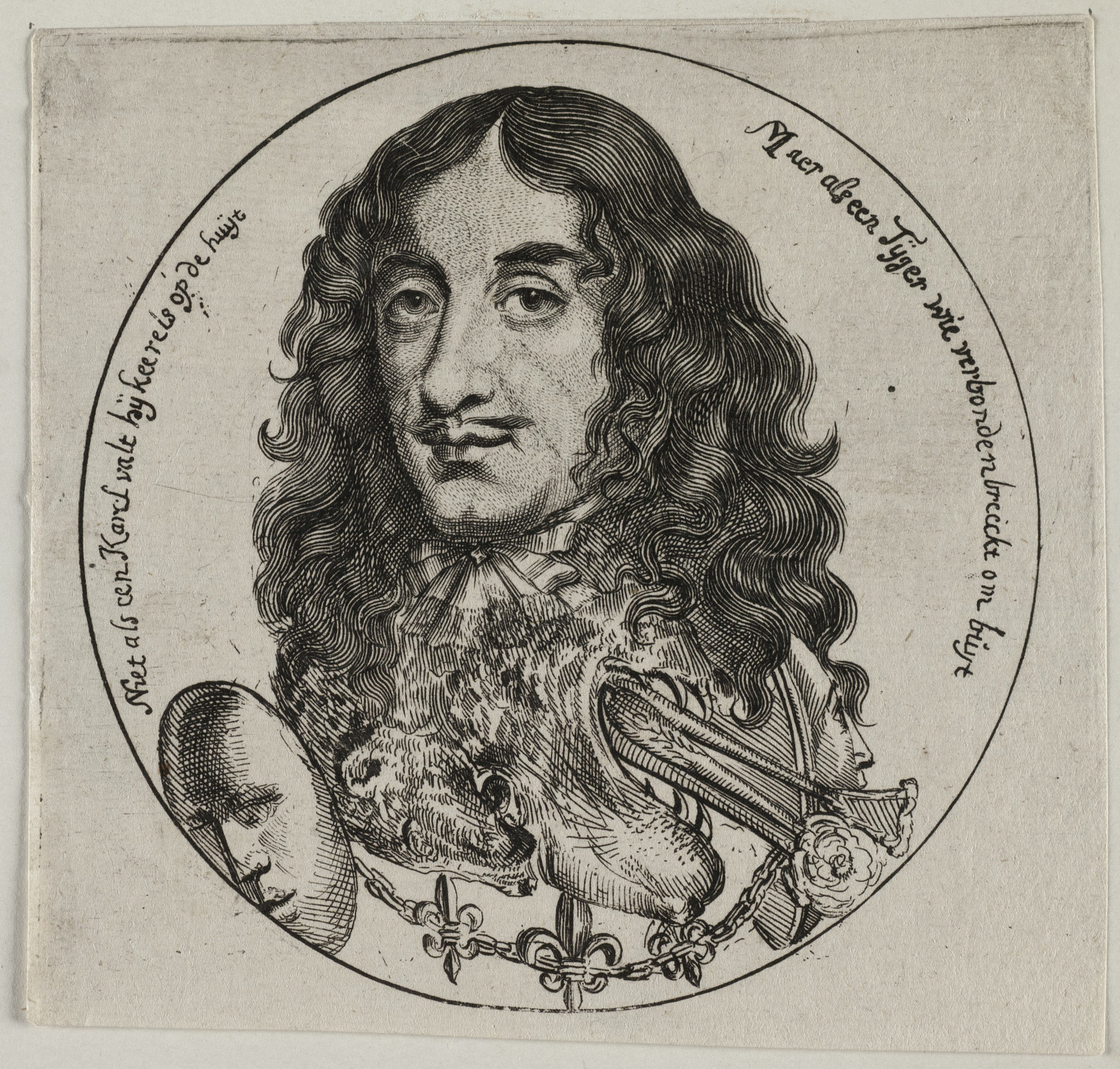
1672 portrait of Charles II

== The stop and its causes ==
Under Charles II the state finances were in such a grievous condition that the Crown found itself no longer able to honour its debts.

Throughout the 1660s, state expenditure had been running ahead of the taxation and revenue that Parliament was prepared to authorise. To bridge the gap, the Crown departments increasingly sold more and more debt to the leading London goldsmith bankers, secured against first call on the following two years' revenues. This was an attractive investment for a gilded circle of preferred bankers, who could make annualised returns of 8 to 10% or more by buying the debt at a discount, at a time when interest payments were capped by law at 6%. The debt was also readily assignable, making it relatively liquid, so bankers could trade it between themselves, or sell it on to private investors. But as a larger and larger proportion of the state's anticipated revenue became pre-committed in this way, its room for independent manoeuvre became narrower and narrower.

The stop came suddenly and unexpectedly on Tuesday 2 January 1672. Payments were suspended upon:

any warrant, securities or orders, whether registered or not registered therein, and payable within that time, excepting only such payments as shall grow due upon orders on the subsidy, according to the Act of Parliament, and orders and securities upon the fee farm rents, both which are to be proceeded upon as if such a stop had never been made.

The period of the stop was to be one year, ending on 31 December 1672. In the interim the king intended that interest would be paid to all those who were owed payment of outstanding bonds that had become due "at the rate of six pounds per cent".

A letter from Richard Langhorne to Lord Hatton on January 6 gives additional background on the causes and effects of the stop:

- A total 82 ships were to be prepared for sail "in the cause of national defense", i.e. to attack the Dutch Republic in the Third Anglo-Dutch War.
- The bankers of Lombard Street were asked for an 'advance' (loan) to the king to finance the fleet, they refused to make the loan.
- Due to the pressing need for money the king and his council resolved to find the money for the fleet by cutting other parts of the treasury's budget – money that had been allocated for the repayment of bonds and securities were to be spent on the fleet and only interest paid with no repayment of principal that year.
- There was great disruption and damage to the financial markets: "I believe it certain that the trade of bankers is totally destroyed by this accident".

The outstanding obligations in all were later estimated to come to £1,211,065. This was similar in magnitude to the king's entire ordinary revenue for 1671–2, including customs, excise, and hearth tax (but excluding additional special revenues granted by Parliament: £378,000 in 1671–2).

=== Subsequent developments ===
Despite the original intention that the stop would be limited to one year, two requests from Charles II to Parliament for new money to pay off the debts gained no support, so the stop was extended, first to May 1673, and then to January 1674. By that time all the anticipated income that had been security for the debts, that the creditors had assignments upon, had both flowed into the Treasury and flowed away again, so effectively the stop became indefinite.

Under a new Lord Treasurer, Thomas Osborne, Earl of Danby, for whom ordered management of the royal finances was a priority (as well as the raising of new finance), the first payments of the promised 6% interest finally started to be made in March 1675, three years in arrears. After a detailed audit, payments were revised in 1677 to take account of the total gross amount (including the unpaid interest to that point) by then outstanding. These payments continued to be made regularly so long as Danby was Lord Treasurer. However, from 1680 they became much more erratic. Between April 1680 and March 1685 only 56% of the expected amount was paid, and between April 1685 and March 1688 during the reign of James II, this fell to only 21%. Finally, after the accession of William and Mary, Parliament reallocated the earmarked revenue completely, to new debts arising from the Nine Years' War against France, and payments dried up altogether.

In response the creditors sued, leading to a lawsuit, The Goldsmith Bankers case, of almost unheard-of length, raising constitutional questions of just what obligations courts could enforce against the Crown. The Court of Exchequer gave judgment in 1692 in favour of the bankers, but the government immediately appealed to the Court of Exchequer Chamber, where in 1696 Lord Somers, shortly afterwards to become Lord Chancellor, reversed the judgment on technical grounds (specifically, that the only remedy was by petition of right, rather than by petition to the Court of Exchequer as had been made in that case) which left a general feeling that an injustice had been done. The case was appealed to the House of Lords, which heard it in January 1700, and found for the bankers. However the warrant for payment then issued by the Barons of the Exchequer limited payment to revenues from the hereditary excise "not otherwise disposed of or applied by Act of Parliament", and the Commons then allocated all of the hereditary excise to current spending.

Facing an "avalanche" of renewed demands, in 1701 Parliament legislated a definitive settlement "in lieu and discharge of certain perpetual annual payments and of all arrears thereof" in the Appropriation of Revenue Act 1700 (12 & 13 Will. 3 c. 12). Interest would thereafter be paid annually at 3% (the generally prevailing rate by that time) – but only from December 1705, and then only on the principal sums as calculated at the end of 1676 (assessed at £1,328,526). For all the missed interest payments from 1680 onwards, including the interest from 1701 to 1704, there was to be no compensation. The rate was later cut to 2.5% by the National Debt Act 1716 (3 Geo. 1. c. 9), which absorbed the debt into the general British national debt.

== Effects ==
The short-term consequences of the stop were disastrous. Gilbert Burnet wrote that "the bankers were broken, and multitudes who had put their money in their hands were ruined by this dishonourable and perfidious action". This seems to have been only a slight exaggeration: the goldsmith bankers were heavily hit, and some of the most prominent, including Edward Backwell and Robert Vyner, went bankrupt. Danby, the Lord Treasurer, promised them compensation, but this was never forthcoming,

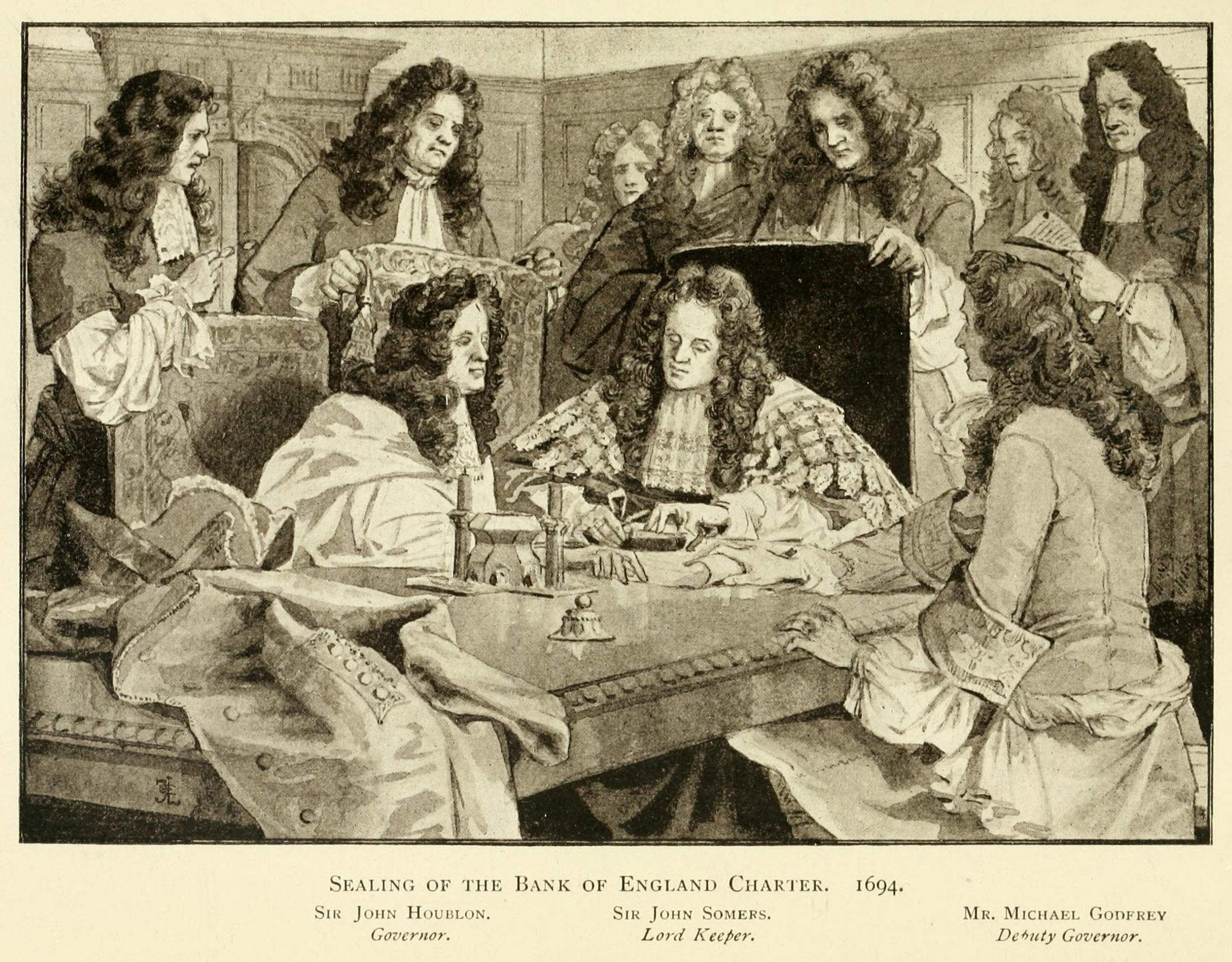
The sealing of the Bank of England Charter (1694)

One important legacy of the Great Stop of Exchequer was the founding of the Bank of England in 1694. The primary purpose of the bank was to raise and lend money to the state: a loan of £1.2 million was made to the government; in return, the subscribers would be incorporated as The Governor and Company of the Bank of England with long-term banking privileges including the issue of notes. The royal charter was granted on 27 July through the passage of the Tonnage Act 1694.

Public finances were in so dire a condition at the time that the terms of the loan were that it was to be serviced at a rate of 8% per annum, and there was also a service charge of £4,000 per annum for the management of the loan.

The founding of the Bank of England put an end to defaults such as the Great Stop of the Exchequer. From now on, the British government would never fail to repay its creditors.

Kenyon argues that the stop was a failure simply because it had never been tried in England before. The French and Spanish governments periodically repudiated their debts without undue difficulty; but from the time of Elizabeth I the English Crown had earned a reputation for paying its debts, and in spite of Charles II's notorious extravagance and carelessness about money, the City of London was quite unprepared for the stop.

The king himself came to regret it as a "false step".
