= United Kingdom national debt =

Total quantity of money borrowed by the Government of the United Kingdom

Raw data
Public sector net debt excluding public sector banks as a percentage of GDP (monthly series, latest month shown in ONS release).

The United Kingdom national debt is the outstanding stock of liabilities owed by the public sector of the United Kingdom. In official statistics it is most commonly reported as public sector net debt excluding public sector banks (PSND ex), which is often referred to as "the national debt".

At the end of November 2025, PSND ex was provisionally estimated at £2,927.7 billion, equivalent to 95.6% of gross domestic product (GDP).

Debt is primarily financed through the issuance of gilt-edged securities (gilts) and Treasury bills by HM Treasury via the Debt Management Office (DMO), alongside retail savings products issued by National Savings and Investments.

National debt is a stock measure and differs from the government's deficit or surplus, which measures borrowing over a period. Other definitions are used in some contexts, including general government gross debt (also known as Maastricht debt) for international comparisons under the European System of Accounts (ESA 2010).

Approximately 8% of the UK national debt is owned by the British government due to the Bank of England's quantitative easing programme, so approximately 8% of the cost of servicing the debt is paid by the government to itself.

In 2017, due to the Government's budget deficit (PSNCR), the national debt increased by £46 billion. The Cameron–Clegg coalition government in 2010 planned that they would eliminate the deficit by the 2015/16 financial year. However, by 2014 they admitted that the structural deficit would not be eliminated until the financial year 2017/18. This forecast was pushed back to 2018/19 in March 2015, and to 2019/20 in July 2015, before the target of a return to surplus at any particular time was finally abandoned by the then Chancellor of the Exchequer George Osborne in July 2016.

== Definition ==
The UK national debt is the total quantity of money borrowed by the Government of the United Kingdom at any time through the issue of securities by the British Treasury and other government agencies.

Public sector debt and borrowing statistics for the United Kingdom are published in the Public sector finances statistical bulletin, produced jointly by the Office for National Statistics (ONS) and HM Treasury. These statistics are compiled using national accounts concepts under the European System of Accounts (ESA 2010) and the System of National Accounts (SNA 2008).

The ONS publishes several related balance-sheet measures. The best-known is public sector net debt excluding public sector banks (PSND ex), which is often used as a proxy for "the national debt". PSND ex is defined as the public sector's accumulated liabilities in loans, debt securities, deposits and currency, minus liquid financial assets such as foreign exchange reserves and cash deposits, with both recorded at nominal value.

Public sector net financial liabilities excluding public sector banks (PSNFL ex) includes all financial assets and liabilities recognised in the national accounts, rather than only liquid assets and the main debt instruments, and is therefore broader than PSND ex. The ONS publishes variants that remove the Bank of England's balance sheet from the PSND aggregate (PSND ex BoE).

For international comparisons, the ONS publishes general government gross debt (often called Maastricht debt). This is a consolidated gross measure for the general government sector, recorded at nominal value, covering currency and deposits, debt securities and loans.

In ONS publications, "ex" measures are the most frequently used balance-sheet aggregates. They exclude public sector banks for those periods from 2008 to 2024 when certain monetary financial institutions were classified within the public sector.

=== Debt-to-GDP ratios ===
Public sector net debt is commonly expressed as a percentage of GDP to aid comparisons over time and between countries. In the monthly public sector finances release, the GDP denominator used for ratios is based on a 12-month total centred on the month being reported and can include forecast data. As a result, debt-to-GDP ratios may be revised as GDP estimates and forecasts are updated.

== Debt versus deficit ==
In the United Kingdom's official statistics, the term "deficit" is most commonly used to describe public sector net borrowing excluding public sector banks (PSNB ex). Net borrowing is an accrued measure of the gap between total public sector spending and total receipts over a period, while net debt is a balance sheet measure at a point in time.

UK central government expenditure (real terms, £ billion). View chart definition.

The UK national debt is often confused with the government budget deficit (officially known as the Public Sector Net Cash Requirement (PSNCR)). For example, the then Prime Minister David Cameron was reprimanded in February 2013 by the UK Statistics Authority for creating confusion between the two, by stating in a political broadcast that his administration was "paying down Britain's debts". In fact, his administration had been attempting to reduce the deficit, not the overall debt; which continued to rise even as the deficit was reduced.

=== Net borrowing ===
Public sector net borrowing (PSNB ex) is equal to the public sector current budget deficit plus net investment. The current budget deficit reflects day-to-day spending and receipts, while net investment covers capital expenditure and capital transfers net of depreciation and capital receipts, within the national accounts framework used for the public sector finances statistics.

=== Cash requirement and financing ===
The public sector net cash requirement (PSNCR ex) is a cash-based measure of how much cash needs to be raised over a period to meet the public sector's obligations. It can be close to net borrowing, but it differs because some transactions affect cash needs without affecting the deficit, and because of timing differences between when spending and receipts are recorded on an accruals basis and when cash is paid or received.

The central government net cash requirement (CGNCR) is a closely watched component because it is a useful indicator of the amount of gilts and Treasury bills that the government needs to issue.

=== From borrowing to changes in debt ===
Changes in public sector net debt between two dates are related to, but not the same as, net borrowing over the intervening period. Differences can arise for several reasons, including:

- financial transactions that affect debt but are not counted in net borrowing, such as loans and other acquisitions of financial assets
- timing differences between accruals measures and cash measures
- classification changes within the public sector boundary and other methodological updates to public finance statistics
- the treatment of certain central bank operations, including how the Bank of England's Asset Purchase Facility consolidates within the public sector balance sheet in official presentations of some aggregates

Some fiscal targets and rules set by governments refer to deficit, debt, or broader balance sheet measures, so the definition used for the target affects how performance is assessed.

=== UK budget ===
The public debt increases or decreases as a result of the annual budget deficit or surplus. The British government budget deficit or surplus is the cash difference between government receipts and spending. The British government debt is rising due to a gap between revenue and expenditure. Total government revenue in the fiscal year 2015/16 was projected to be £673 billion, whereas total expenditure was estimated at £742 billion. Therefore, the total deficit was £69 billion. This represented a rate of borrowing of a little over £1.3 billion per week.

=== Gilts ===
The British government finances its debt by issuing gilts, or Government securities. These securities are the simplest form of government bond and make up the largest share of British government debt. A conventional gilt is a bond issued by the British government that pays the holder a fixed cash payment (or coupon) every six months until maturity, at which point the holder receives the final coupon payment and the return of the principal.

== Cost of servicing the debt ==
Debt interest is the cost of servicing outstanding public sector liabilities, reported in official statistics as part of public sector current expenditure.

For central government, debt interest costs depend on the size and composition of the debt stock and on market conditions. Conventional gilts pay fixed cash coupons, while index-linked gilts adjust both coupons and principal in line with the Retail Prices Index (RPI) with a lag, which can increase the accrued cost of servicing debt when RPI inflation is high.

Debt interest measures can be affected by the interaction between central government debt and the Bank of England's holdings of gilts. The Bank is part of the public sector, so interest paid on gilts held by the Bank does not leave the public sector on a consolidated basis. The Office for Budget Responsibility (OBR) describes the net effect on public sector debt interest as depending on the difference between coupon income on gilts held by the Bank and the interest paid on the reserves created to finance those purchases.

The OBR reports that debt interest as a share of GDP fell in the decade before 2019–20, reflecting historically low interest rates, low RPI inflation, and the expansion of gilt holdings by the Bank. Debt interest rose sharply in 2022–23 as inflation increased and interest rates rose.

UK central government debt interest as percentage of GDP. View chart definition.

== Credit rating ==
Like other sovereign debt, the United Kingdom's central government debt is rated by credit rating agencies.

Major long-term sovereign credit ratings for the United Kingdom (late 2025)
Agency	Rating	Outlook	Most recent publicly reported action
S&P Global Ratings	AA	Stable	Rating described as AA with a stable outlook (28 November 2025)
Fitch Ratings	AA−	Stable	Reaffirmed AA− rating with a stable outlook (August 2025)
Moody's	Aa3	Stable	Affirmed Aa3 rating with a stable outlook (21 November 2025)

On 23 February 2013, it was reported that Moody's had downgraded UK debt from Aaa to Aa1, the first time since 1978 that the country has not had an AAA credit rating.

This was described as a "humiliating blow" by Shadow Chancellor Ed Balls. George Osborne, the Chancellor, said that it was "a stark reminder of the debt problems facing our country", adding that "we will go on delivering the plan that has cut the deficit by a quarter". France and the United States of America had each lost their AAA credit status in 2012.

The agency Fitch also downgraded its credit rating for British government debt from AAA to AA+ in April 2013.

Further downgrades were made by Fitch and Standard & Poor's in June 2016, following the UK's vote in the referendum of that month to leave the European Union.

In March 2020, Fitch downgraded the United Kingdom's long-term issuer rating from AA to AA− and assigned a negative outlook, citing the deterioration of the public finances linked to the COVID-19 shock and fiscal policy decisions.

Moody's lowered the United Kingdom's rating from Aa2 to Aa3 in October 2020 and revised its outlook to stable from negative.

In October 2022, Moody's changed the outlook on the United Kingdom to negative while maintaining its Aa3 rating, citing political and policy uncertainty. Fitch revised the outlook on the United Kingdom to stable from negative in March 2024, while affirming its AA− rating.

== Remedies for indebtedness ==
Some political parties in Britain agree that the national debt is too high, but disagree on the best policy to deal with it, with Conservative Party politicians advocating a larger role for cuts to public spending. By contrast, the Labour Party tends to advocate fewer cuts and more emphasis on economic stimulus, higher rates of taxation on wealthier individuals and corporations and new taxes for those.

Another body of opinion is that the "consensus" regarding the problematic nature of the national debt is incorrect. The view proposed by economists such as Professor Stephanie Kelton of Stony Brook University in New York is that there is often too much emphasis in political discussions on 'balancing the books'. Zack Polanski (leader of the Green Party of England and Wales) subscribes to a borrowing philosophy that constrains deficits as a means of inflation control, rather than for purposes of limiting total debt magnitude. This view has been described by some commentators as conforming to Modern Monetary Theory.

Public debt sustainability is often discussed in terms of whether the debt-to-GDP ratio is stable over time. International Monetary Fund (IMF) analysis describes several channels through which debt ratios have fallen historically, including improvements in fiscal balances, higher economic growth and higher inflation, alongside changes in interest rates and, in some cases, debt restructuring.

In the United Kingdom, responsibility for managing the government's financing operations sits with HM Treasury and the UK Debt Management Office (DMO). The government's debt management objective is to minimise, over the long term, the costs of meeting the government's financing needs, taking into account risk, while ensuring that debt management policy is consistent with the aims of monetary policy. The DMO carries out gilt and Treasury bill issuance and other debt and cash management operations within that framework.

Long-term debt sustainability is assessed by institutions such as the Office for Budget Responsibility (OBR), which publishes regular analysis of fiscal risks and long-run projections and discusses how demographic, economic and policy factors can affect future debt paths.

== History ==
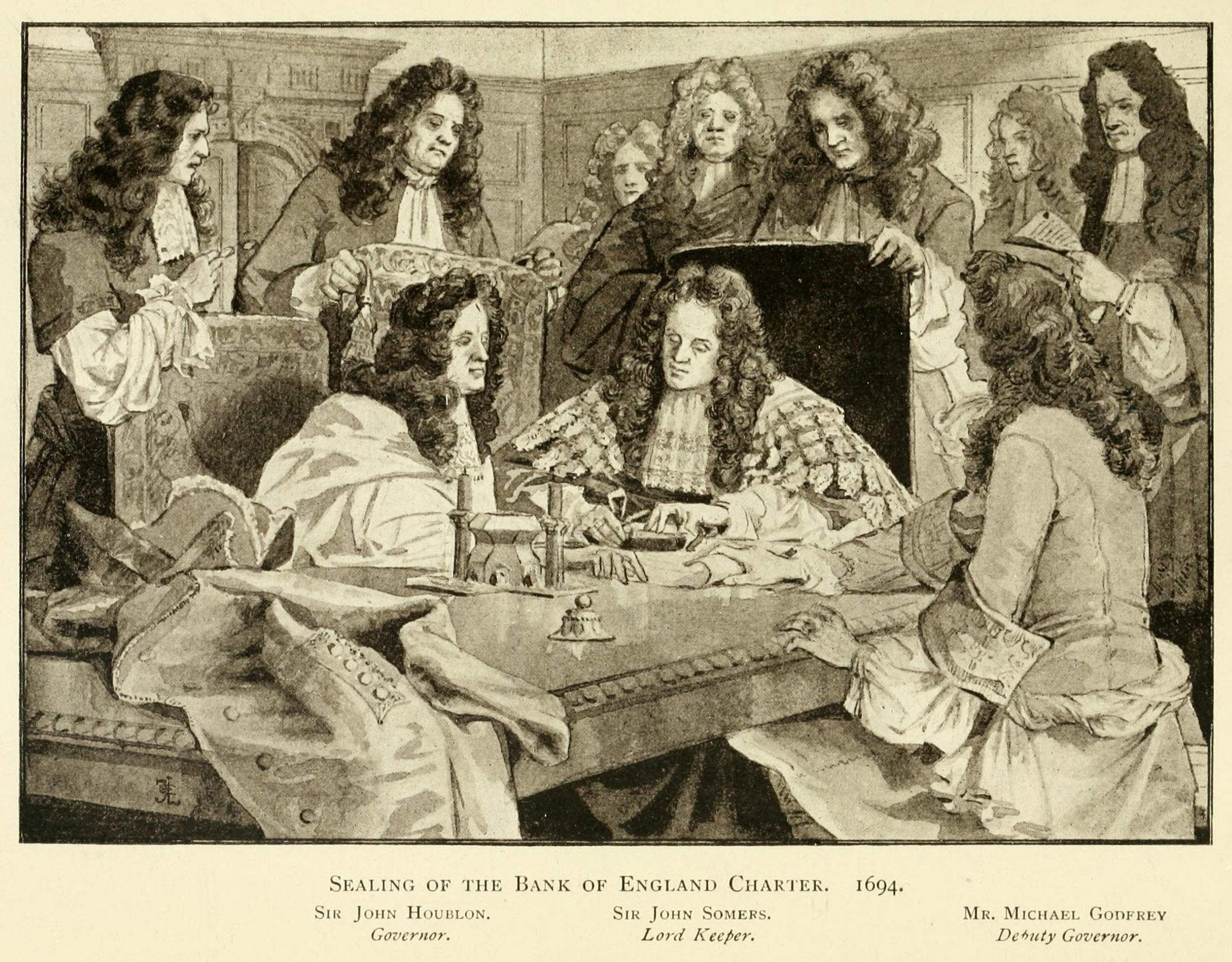
The sealing of the Bank of England Charter (1694)

The origins of the British national debt can be found during the reign of William III, who engaged a syndicate of City traders and merchants to offer for sale an issue of government debt. This syndicate soon evolved into the Bank of England, eventually financing the wars of the Duke of Marlborough and later imperial conquests. The national debt increased dramatically during and after the Napoleonic Wars, rising to around 200% of GDP. Over the course of the 19th century the national debt gradually fell, only to see large increases again during World War I and World War II. After the war, the national debt once again slowly fell as a proportion of GDP.

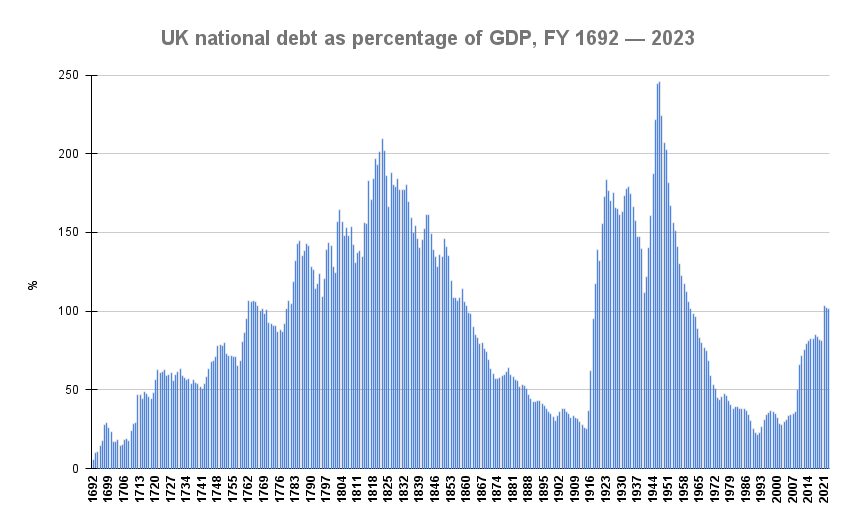
History of the UK government debt as a proportion of GDP

=== Modern era ===
In 1976, the British Government led by James Callaghan faced a Sterling crisis during which the value of the pound tumbled and the government found it difficult to raise sufficient funds to maintain its spending commitments. The Prime Minister was forced to apply to the International Monetary Fund for a £2.3 billion rescue package; the largest-ever call on IMF resources up to that point. In November 1976, the IMF announced its conditions for a loan, including deep cuts in public expenditure, in effect taking control of UK domestic policy. The crisis was seen as a national humiliation, with Callaghan being forced to go "cap in hand" to the IMF.

=== Recent history ===
In the late 1990s and early 2000s, the national debt dropped in relative terms, falling to 29% of GDP by 2002. In 1997, the Labour Government of Tony Blair had inherited a PSNCR of approximately £5 billion per annum, but by sticking to the spending plans of the outgoing Conservative Government, this was gradually turned into a modest budget surplus. During the Spending Review of 2000, Labour began to pursue a looser fiscal policy, and by 2002 annual borrowing had reached £20 billion.

The national debt continued to increase, together with sustained economic growth, increasing to 37% of GDP in 2007. This was due to extra government borrowing, largely caused by increased spending on health, education, and social security benefits. Between 2008 and 2013, when the British economy slowed sharply and fell into recession, the national debt rose dramatically, mainly caused by increased spending on social security benefits, financial bailouts for banks, and a significant drop in receipts from stamp duty, corporate tax, and income tax.

In the 20-year period from 1986/87 to 2006/07 government spending in the United Kingdom averaged around 40% of GDP. As a result of the 2008 financial crisis and the Great Recession, government spending increased to a historically high level of 48% of GDP in 2009/10, partly as a result of the cost of a series of bank bailouts. In July 2007, Britain had government debt at 35.5% of GDP. This figure rose to 56.8% of GDP by July 2009.

== The national debt today ==
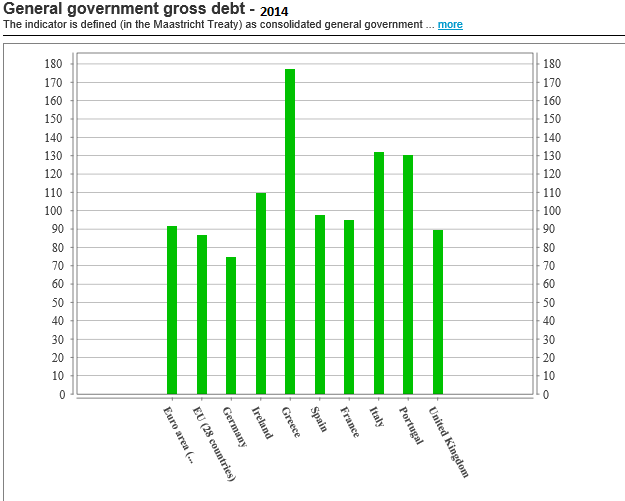
UK balance sheet compared with the eurozone in 2014

Public sector net debt excluding public sector banks (PSND ex) was provisionally estimated at 95.6% of GDP at the end of November 2025, which the ONS reported as a level last seen in the early 1960s. Debt rose sharply during the COVID-19 pandemic period and remained elevated in the mid-2020s compared with the decades before 2008.

During the COVID-19 pandemic, national debt reached £2.004 trillion for the first time due to government spending on virus measures, such as the Coronavirus Job Retention Scheme ("furlough scheme").

The annual amount that the government must borrow to plug the gap in its finances used to be known as the public sector borrowing requirement, but is now called the Public Sector Net Cash Requirement (PSNCR). The PSNCR figure for the financial year end 2017 was £46 billion, total British GDP in 2017 was £1.959 trillion.

By historic peacetime standards, the national debt is large and growing. There is concern that official calculations of national debt omit many 'off-book' liabilities which mask the true nature of the debt: for example, Nick Silver of the Institute of Economic Affairs estimated the current British liabilities, including state and public pensions, as well as other commitments by the government, to be near £5 trillion, compared with the Government's estimate of £845 billion (as of 17 November 2010) These liabilities can be compared to total net assets (2010 figures) of £7.3 trillion, which equates to approximately a net worth of £120,000 per head of the population. Based on such a method of calculation, UK national debt would be equivalent to, or potentially exceed, historic highs.

The British government's debt is owned by a wide variety of investors, most notably pension funds. These funds are on deposit, mainly in the form of Treasury bonds at the Bank of England. The pension funds, therefore, have an asset which has to be offset by a liability, or a debt, of the government. As of the end of 2016, 27.6% of the national debt was owed to overseas governments and investors.

=== Debt instruments ===
Most central government wholesale borrowing is raised through the issuance of gilts and Treasury bills by the UK Debt Management Office (DMO), within the framework set out by HM Treasury in the annual Debt Management Report. The DMO reports debt portfolio statistics for the central government wholesale debt stock. At 31 March 2025, it reported an uplifted nominal value of £2,558 billion for its debt portfolio, comprising £1,852 billion of conventional gilts, £631 billion of index-linked gilts and £75 billion of Treasury bills.

=== Maturity and inflation exposure ===
The maturity profile of government debt affects refinancing risk and the sensitivity of debt interest costs to changes in market rates and inflation. The OBR reports that the average maturity of the stock of debt fell from 16 years in 2017–18 to less than 15 years in 2023–24, increasing the sensitivity of debt interest costs to short-term interest rate changes. The DMO reported a nominal value-weighted average maturity of 14.02 years for its debt portfolio at 31 March 2025.

=== Bank of England holdings ===
In official public sector balance sheet presentations, the Bank of England and its Asset Purchase Facility are within the public sector boundary, so gilt holdings that are consolidated within the public sector do not affect the public sector balance sheet in the same way as gilts held outside the public sector. The ONS explains that while consolidated gilt holdings do not affect the public sector balance sheet, the reserves created to finance those purchases remain a public sector liability in currency and deposits until repaid.

== International comparisons ==
International comparisons of government debt typically use general government gross debt (Maastricht debt), which is defined on a consolidated basis for the general government sector and is recorded at nominal value for currency and deposits, debt securities and loans. This is a different measure from public sector net debt excluding public sector banks (PSND ex), which is commonly used in United Kingdom domestic public finance reporting and is a net measure for the wider public sector.

The International Monetary Fund (IMF) publishes internationally comparable debt series in its World Economic Outlook (WEO) database. The IMF notes that debt data refer to the end of the year and are not always fully comparable across countries because of differences in national reporting and adjustments applied for cross-economy comparability.

General government gross debt in major advanced economies (percent of GDP, 2024)
Economy	Gross debt (% of GDP), 2024
United States	122.3
Euro area	87.2
Germany	63.5
France	113.1
Italy	135.3
Japan	236.1
United Kingdom	101.2
Canada	111.3

== See also ==
- 2011 United Kingdom budget
- Economic history of the United Kingdom
- Economy of the United Kingdom
- Euro area crisis
- The National Fund
- UK Debt Management Office
- National debt of the United States
- Whole of Government Accounts
- Budget of the United Kingdom
- Government debt
- List of countries by government debt

== Bibliography ==
- Burk, Kathleen; Alec Cairncross (1992). Goodbye, Great Britain: The 1976 IMF Crisis. Yale University Press. ISBN 978-0300057287.
- Ferguson, Niall (2008). The Ascent of Money: A Financial History of the World. Penguin Press. ISBN 978-1594201929.
