= The National Fund =

British charity

- Types: nonprofit organization
- Focus: Paying the National Debt
- Country: United Kingdom
- Area served: United Kingdom
- Revenue: 17,867,361 pound sterling (2020)
- Total Assets: 542,869,748 pound sterling (2023)

The National Fund was a British charity which existed from 1928 to 2026, the purpose of which was to pay off the United Kingdom national debt in full. At the time of its closure, the value was over £585m.

The fund was set up in 1928 with a £500,000 anonymous donation. In 2019 the Government stated it "does not hold information about the identity of the donor who set up the Fund." It was suggested that the donor pledged the money as a response to a 1919 Financial Times editorial by then-Financial Secretary to the Treasury Stanley Baldwin, which suggested patriotic rich citizens voluntarily contribute towards paying the debt accumulated from World War I. In 2020 it was revealed in court documents that the anonymous benefactor was Gaspard Farrer, a former partner at the now-defunct Barings Bank.

The value of the fund rose steadily, reaching £69,300,504 on 31 March 1989. The value of the fund stood at £519,707,831 on 5 April 2019, an increase of £20.9 million on the year before.

Many alternative uses for the money held by the National Fund were proposed, such as that the money should be disbursed to help the voluntary sector respond to the demands of the 2020 coronavirus pandemic.

On 22 May 2018 an application was made to the High Court by the Attorney General for the release of the National Fund for the purposes of reducing the National Debt. The court date was originally set for November 2019, but just before the trial someone came forward "claiming to be the original benefactor's great-great-nephew, arguing that the original charitable gift has failed and that the funds be distributed to the original donor's estate."

In answer to a parliamentary question asked in the House of Lords in June 2020 by Baroness Hayter of Kentish Town, government minister Lord Keen of Elie stated, "It is now for the High Court to determine the individual's claims and decide whether the terms of the charitable trust should be varied as sought by the Attorney General. If the Attorney General's application is successful the money in the fund will be paid over to the National Debt Commissioners towards the reduction of the national debt."

Court intervention was required because, under the terms of the fund, its value was to be left to accumulate until such time as it was sufficient to pay off the National Debt in full. With the UK's National Debt standing at £1,891.8 billion in December 2019, the fund was equivalent to less than 0.03 per cent of it, even though it has been accumulating for over 90 years. Indeed, in 2018 the UK Government, through a ministerial answer to a written parliamentary question, stated that, according to expert evidence, "there is no realistic prospect of the Fund ever amounting to a sum sufficient to pay off the whole of the National Debt."

On 21 January 2022 the Chancery Division of the High Court of Justice handed down its judgment in H.M. Attorney General -v- Zedra Fiduciary Services (UK) Limited. Applying the cy-pres doctrine and considering competing cy-pres schemes from the Attorney General and from Zedra (the current trustees of the Fund), the court approved a scheme proposed by the Attorney General for England and Wales to amend the underlying trust deed to permit the balance of the Fund to be applied against the UK national debt. This was upheld by the Court of Appeal in 2023. The money was transferred in 2024–25 and the charity was closed in 2026.
