= Land bank =

Land bank may refer to:

- Land Bank of Taiwan, a wholly state-owned bank of the Republic of China (Taiwan)
- Land Bank of the Philippines, a bank in the Philippines with a special focus on serving the needs of farmers and fishermen
- Land banking, the buying and holding (rather than developing) of land for future development or use
- Land bank (banking), a bank that issues long-term loans on real estate in return for mortgages
- Land Bank (1695), an early rival to the Bank of England
