= Public Sector Net Cash Requirement =

United Kingdom sustainable government finance policy

The Public Sector Net Cash Requirement (PSNCR), formerly known as the Public Sector Borrowing Requirement (PSBR), is the official term for the Government budget deficit in the United Kingdom, that is to say the rate at which the British Government must borrow money in order to maintain its financial commitments.

The PSNCR is distinct from, but often confused with, the United Kingdom national debt, which is the total amount of money owed by the British Government to its creditors at any given time. The greater the PSNCR, the more the National Debt will tend to increase. The PSNCR is also distinct from the debt interest, which is the amount the UK government must pay annually to finance the existing national debt.

== Financing the PSNCR ==
The PSNCR is financed by borrowing – principally by means of the sale of government gilt edged stocks, usually known as gilts. Since 2009 large quantities of gilts have been created and repurchased by the Bank of England under its policy of quantitative easing, with a view to stimulating economic growth.

== Recent history ==
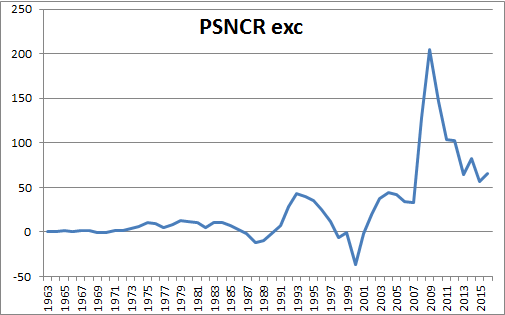
Timeline of PSNCR (excluding public sector banks) in £billions

In 1997 the Labour government of Tony Blair inherited a PSNCR of approximately £5 billion per annum, but by sticking to the parsimonious spending plans of the outgoing Conservative Government, this was gradually turned into a modest budget surplus. Labour began to pursue a looser fiscal policy following the 2000 Spending Review, and they started to run an annual deficit from January 2002. This cash requirement reached £43.935 bn in September 2005 before declining to £23.916 bn in September 2007. Even excluding bank interventions, the PSNCR then climbed through the Great Recession to peak at £206.116 bn in August 2009 and dropped to £71.135 bn in April 2014.

Coalition government policy was to bring down the PSNCR to zero within the lifetime of the 2010–2015 parliament. In his budget speech in March 2011 Chancellor of the Exchequer, George Osborne stated that "Our fiscal mandate is to achieve a cyclically-adjusted current balance by the end of the rolling five year forecast period – which is currently 2015–16" but having failed to do this by 2015 his revised aim was to balance the books by 2020. Following the departure of George Osborne, his replacement Philip Hammond dropped the goal of eliminating the budget deficit, giving himself leeway to help the economy cope with the slowdown expected as Britain prepares to leave the European Union.

== See also ==
- History of the British national debt
- United Kingdom government austerity programme
- United Kingdom national debt
