= Whole of Government Accounts =

Whole of Government Accounts (WGA) is the annual publication by the United Kingdom Government of the consolidated financial statements of over 5,500 organisations across the public sector. It aims to provide more complete data for fiscal planning by producing consolidated financial statements which are produced in accordance with the International Financial Reporting Standards (IFRS), the system of accounts used internationally by the private sector.

The accounts are independently audited by the Comptroller and Auditor General, and they are scrutinized by the Public Accounts Committee each year.

== Background ==
The Treasury first published a scoping study for WGA in July 1998. WGA are prepared under Sections 9 to 11 of the Government Resources and Accounts Act 2000 and cover the whole of the UK public sector (central government, local government, health, and public corporations). WGA are prepared under International Financial Reporting Standards.

The first set of accounts to be published was for the year ended 31 March 2010. The accounts omit large public sector liabilities: in particular, pension liabilities are omitted from the accounts even though they are a liability under IFRS rules.

== Structure ==
The structure of the document is the same as that for any private sector organisation using IFRS. In particular, the following consolidated statements are included:

- Consolidated Statement of Revenue and Expenditure with the other comprehensive income part shown as a separate statement;
- Consolidated Statement of Comprehensive Income
- Consolidated Statement of Financial Position, showing public sector assets and liabilities;
- Consolidated Statement of Changes in Taxpayers’ Equity
- Consolidated Cash Flow Statement; and
- Notes to the Accounts

It also includes a Statement on Internal Control as well as detailing the Accounting Officer’s responsibilities and a Remuneration Report

== Results for FY 2010 ==
The Whole of Governments Accounts for the year ended 31 March 2010 was published on 29 November 2011. It was the first ever set of audited financial statements for the UK public sector. The 2009-10 WGA brings together, for the first time, audited financial information from the UK’s central government, local government, the National Health Service (NHS) and public corporations. It makes clear a number of metrics that previously had been difficult to calculate, such as the net public service pension liability, the Government’s commitments under private finance initiative (PFI) contracts, total provisions, and contingent liabilities.

As this is the first year in which WGA is published, there is no historical data for comparison. Over time, annual publications of WGA will allow the user to build up a clear and consistent picture of trends and changes in the Government’s fiscal position. WGA also allows for international comparisons of fiscal balance sheets to be made, provided that other countries’ accounts are produced on a comparable basis.

The accounts are available on the UK's Treasury website: http://www.hm-treasury.gov.uk/wga.

== Audit Report ==
The Whole of Government Accounts are subject to audit by the Comptroller & Auditor General (C&AG).

The C&AG audited the 2009–10 WGA and concluded:

In my opinion, except for the effects of the matters described in the Basis for Qualified Opinion paragraphs above: the financial statements give a true and fair view of the state of the affairs of the Whole of Government as at 31 March 2010 and of its net deficit, changes in taxpayers' equity and cash flows for the year then ended; and the financial statements have been properly prepared in accordance with the Government Resources and Accounts Act 2000.

The C&AG report on the 2009–10 WGA is available on the National Audit Office's website.

== See also ==
- National Audit Office (UK)
- Gold reserves of the United Kingdom
