= 1891 Waterford City by-election =

UK parliamentary by-election

The 1891 Waterford City by-election was a parliamentary by-election held for the United Kingdom House of Commons constituency of Waterford City on 23 December 1891. It arose as a result of the death of the sitting member, Richard Power of the Irish Parliamentary Party.

== Background ==
The by-election arose in a period when the Irish Parliamentary Party was still suffering the effects of the split that arose after a majority of its MPs objected to the continued leadership of Charles Stewart Parnell. The anti-Parnellite group had won a series of by-elections against Parnellite candidates, and even though Parnell himself had died the bitter feelings that had arisen meant no reunion of the factions was in prospect. Richard Power had been one of the supporters of Parnell, and when John Redmond, the leading member of the Parnellite group, failed to win the leader's former seat in Cork City, having resigned his own North Wexford seat to run in the resulting by-election, the Waterford City constituency was a natural choice for a return to Parliament. In municipal elections held the previous month in the city, Parnellites won all four contested seats.

== Campaign ==
After Redmond announced that he would stand as the Parnellite candidate there were signs that he would be unopposed. Michael Davitt, a prominent member of the Anti-Parnellite group, wrote to the newspapers suggesting there be no opposition 'to make the occasion one of reconciliation and unity' since there would be a general election in the following year, and Archbishop Walsh of Dublin recommended postponing the contest until after the Christmas period. The Parnellites, however, conscious of their strong standing in the constituency, pressed on with their campaign. Responding to Davitt's letter a week later, Redmond stated that 'he had hoped that there was something sincere in the suggestion,' but that 'it had been discarded and a contest was forced on the constituency'. A Mr Keane, a wine merchant, was being proposed as the Anti-Parnellite candidate. It was reported that Davitt had been asked to stand, but had refused.

Events took a dramatic turn a few days later, when a large anti-Parnellite meeting was held in the town. When a group of supporters crossed the city's toll bridge they came under attack from Parnellite supporters. "A general fight ensued", the Times reported, "and the factions beat each other in a violent and sometimes brutal manner". Michael Davitt was struck violently, and blood had to be wiped from his face with handkerchiefs. Hundreds of police had been drafted in, in anticipation of trouble, and had to intervene, "and batoned each party indiscriminately". When Davitt addressed the meeting, he insisted that he had come "to use what little influence he possessed on the side of quietness, peacefulness and good temper" but that in response to the day's events he had decided to agree to be the Anti-Parnellite candidate. It was reported that Redmond, on hearing of the assault on Davitt, called at his hotel to express regret at the incident.

A key element of the electorate were the working class voters in the city. Redmond, addressing the workers in local bacon-curing factories, told them not to be deceived into thinking Davitt was the candidate of the working man, because he was "prepared to accept anything that Gladstone and the Liberal Party choose to give". William O'Brien, addressing a closed meeting of Anti-Parnellite supporters, told them Davitt was "the candidate of the people's hearts" and that Redmond and his allies were "absolutely dependent on the Tories". The next day, when Davitt wanted to address workers in the city's pork cellars, they closed the gates and refused to meet him. Nevertheless, he announced that the promises of support he had received led him to believe he would be returned with a large majority. It was reported that the police had reduced their presence as they did not expect a repeat of the earlier violence. There were accounts that Davitt and his supporters were having difficulty getting rooms in which to have meetings, and that trade union premises and working men's clubs were closed to him. It was difficult to get local men to work on his campaign, and had to depend on clerical support.

== Voting ==
On the eve of polling, Davitt told the press he expected a majority of up to 100 votes; Redmond announced that he was expecting a majority of around 500, "and allows for 800 broken promises". The Times predicted a Redmond victory, though with a smaller majority, and observed that "it was not unusual during the progress of this election campaign to find the people hiss the priests as they conducted a canvass". Redmond's estimates turned out to be accurate: when the votes were counted, he had won 1,775 votes and Davitt had 1,229, a Parnellite majority of 546.

== Result ==
By-election 1891: Waterford City
Party	Candidate	Votes	%	±%
Irish National League	John Redmond	1,775	59.1	N/A
Irish National Federation	Michael Davitt	1,229	40.9	N/A
Majority		546	18.2	N/A
Turnout		3,004	74.2	N/A
Registered electors		4,046		
Irish National League gain from Irish Parliamentary		Swing	N/A	
