= Roger Sweetman =

Irish politician and barrister (1874–1954)

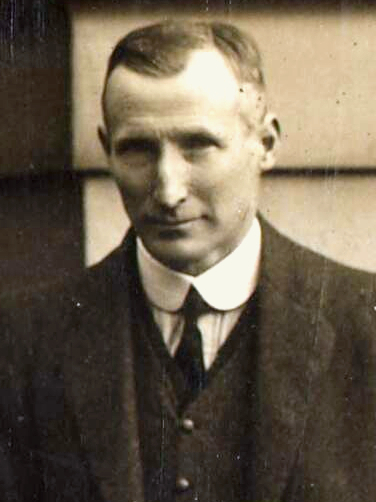
- Sweetman in 1919

Teachta Dála
- In office December 1918 – 27 January 1921
- Constituency: Wexford North

Personal details
- Born: 18 August 1874 Dublin, Ireland
- Died: 20 May 1954 (aged 79) Dublin, Ireland
- Party: Sinn Féin
- Spouse: Katharine Kelly
- Children: 11, including Edmund
- Relatives: John Sweetman (cousin); Gerard Sweetman (nephew)
- Education: King's Inns

Roger Mary Sweetman (18 August 1874 – 20 May 1954) was an Irish Sinn Féin politician and barrister.

== Early life ==
Sweetman was the son of brewer Hugh Sweetman of Roebuck Hall, Dundrum, Dublin, from a Catholic family that became prosperous as brewers in the 18th century. His mother was Gertrude Blackney. He was educated at Downside School. He was called to the bar from King's Inns in 1898. An amateur tennis player, he won the 1905 East of Ireland championship, and in 1902 reached the final of the Irish Open men's doubles and lost to Sydney Howard Smith in the first round of the Wimbledon singles.

== Sinn Féin ==
Sweetman's cousin John Sweetman was an Irish Parliamentary Party MP from 1892 to 1895, who migrated to Sinn Féin and became its second president in 1908. When John declined on age grounds to stand in the 1918 general election in North Wexford, Roger stood instead and unseated Thomas Esmonde of the Irish Parliamentary Party. He joined the other Sinn Féin members by refusing to sit in the Westminster House of Commons and in January 1919 attended the inaugural meeting of the First Dáil at the Mansion House, Dublin, which proclaimed itself parliament of an Irish Republic.

In November 1920, breaking ranks with Sinn Féin, Sweetman wrote to the press calling for a truce and peace negotiations in the Irish War of Independence, and criticising Irish Republican Army actions, in particular the assassinations on Bloody Sunday. He was criticised for this when the Dáil next met on 25 January 1921. Two days later he announced his resignation as Teachta Dála because of his "radical disagreement with the majority ... on a vital matter of policy". He did not contest the June 1921 election. Thereafter he concentrated on farming, promoting use of Friesian cattle in dairy farming.

== Family ==
In May 1904 Sweetman married Katharine (Kathleen) Mary Kelly, daughter of Thomas Aliaga-Kelly. They lived in Herbert Park, Dublin, and later at Derrybawn House, Glendalough. They had 11 children, 5 sons and 6 daughters including: Edmund Sweetman, a Senator.

A nephew was Gerard Sweetman, was Minister for Finance in the 1954–1957 coalition.

== See also ==
- Families in the Oireachtas

Parliament of the United Kingdom
Preceded by Sir Thomas Esmonde	Member of Parliament for North Wexford; 1918–1922	Constituency abolished
Oireachtas
New constituency	Teachta Dála for North Wexford; 1918–1921	Constituency abolished
