= 1892 North Wexford by-election =

UK Parliamentary by-election

The 1892 North Wexford by-election was a parliamentary by-election held for the United Kingdom House of Commons constituency of North Wexford on 11 March 1892. The vacancy arose because of the resignation of the sitting member, John Redmond of the Irish Parliamentary Party, in order to contest the seat of Cork City, following the death of its MP, Charles Stewart Parnell; Redmond, as a supporter of Parnell following a party split, was chosen to run as representative of the Parnellite faction.

Only one candidate was nominated, Thomas Joseph Healy of the anti-Parnellite Irish National Federation, and he was therefore elected unopposed. Redmond failed to be elected in Cork City, but shortly afterwards won a by-election in the constituency of Waterford City.
