= Edmund Sweetman =

Irish politician (1912–1968)

Senator
- In office 21 April 1948 – 14 August 1951
- Constituency: Nominated by the Taoiseach

Personal details
- Born: 1912 County Wicklow, Ireland
- Died: 16 December 1968 (aged 55–56)
- Party: Fine Gael
- Parent: Roger Sweetman (father)

Edmund Thomas Sweetman (1912 – 16 December 1968) was an Irish Fine Gael politician, who was a member of Seanad Éireann from 1948 to 1951. A solicitor, he was an unsuccessful Fine Gael candidate for the Wicklow constituency at the 1944 and 1948 general elections. He was nominated by the Taoiseach to the Seanad in 1948. He did not contest the 1951 Seanad election.

His father Roger Sweetman was a Sinn Féin Teachta Dála (TD) for Wexford North from 1918 to 1921.

== See also ==
- Families in the Oireachtas
