= Irish Reform Association =

The Irish Reform Association (1904–1905) was an attempt to introduce limited devolved self-government to Ireland by a group of reform oriented Irish unionist land owners who proposed to initially adopt something less than full Home Rule. It failed to gain acceptance due to fierce opposition from Ulster Unionists who on the one hand claimed it went too far, and on the other hand denounced by Irish Nationalists who claimed it did not go far enough. Also known as the Irish Reform Movement, it ended in calamity for most of those concerned.

== Background ==
Since the 1870s a Land War had been waged incessantly by tenant farmers in Ireland against their gentry landlords mainly due to rack-renting, evictions and depressed economic conditions. The United Kingdom Government tried to alleviate tensions by introducing several Irish Land Acts which only partly relieved the situation. At the turn of the century the United Irish League, founded in 1898, intensified agrarian agitations and pressure on the landlords. As a consequence a number of leading and progressive landlords proposed to negotiate terms to settle the age old "Irish land question" by calling a Land Conference backed by the Chief Secretary for Ireland George Wyndham.

== Founded ==
The swift success of the Land Conference resulted in the enactment of the Land Purchase (Ireland) Act 1903, won by William O'Brien MP, leader of the tenant representation during the Conference. O'Brien resigned from the Irish Parliamentary Party in November 1903, claiming he was making no headway with his policy of conciliation. O'Brien's defiance of the party encouraged the landlord 'Land Conference Committee' to summon a meeting in Dublin early in 1904 attended by three hundred of the leading Irish gentry and landlords who resolved themselves into the Irish Reform Association, led by the Earl of Dunraven, who had been the presiding genius of the Land Conference and of that triumph of conciliation. Many were moderate southern supporters of the Irish Unionist Alliance.

It immediately issued a manifesto proclaiming "a policy of conciliation, of good will and of reform" by means of "a union of all moderate and progressive opinion irrespective of creed or class animosities" with the object of "the devolution to Ireland of a large measure of self-government without disturbing the Parliamentary Union." Within three days John Redmond MP, who was on a mission pleading Irish American support cabled "The announcement [of the Irish Reform Association] is of the utmost importance. It is simply a declaration for Home Rule and is quite a wonderful thing. With these men with us Home Rule may come at any moment." O'Brien welcomed it for the change it indicated in the attitude towards the national question of a powerful group of moderate Irish Conservatives. He welcomed it particularly for its harmony with his own principles of Conference, Conciliation and Consent. It was, he added, a fresh manifestation of the spirit of national fellowship and co-operation engendered by the Land Conference. Devolution is the Latin for Home Rule happily chimed in T. P. O'Connor MP from London In contrast John Dillon MP and Michael Davitt were wholly in discord, that the Association blocked the advance of the Nationalist cause. The diehard Unionists of Ulster were also against the scheme – "worse than Home Rule of the Gladstone type, or Repeal of the Union", said Sir Edward Carson MP.

== Devolution ==
The head of the Civil Service in Dublin Castle, Sir Anthony MacDonnell, a Mayo Catholic originally appointed by Wyndham, anxious to do something for Ireland, helped Dunraven's group at his invitation and began to draft a scheme on the possible extension of the principle of self-government for Ireland. On 31 August 1904 the Reform Association released a preliminary report calling for the devolution of larger powers of local government for Ireland. This was followed by a publication on 26 September outlining a scheme foreseeing administrative control over Irish finances by a partly elected authority to promote bills for purely Irish purposes. When with the approval of the Lord-Lieutenant, the Earl of Dudley, MacDonnell sponsored this scheme for the devolution of certain domestic affairs to an Irish Council, it heralded high hopes for O'Brien, that Ireland had somehow entered a new era in which 'conference plus business' could replace agitation and parliamentary tactics as a primary strategy for achieving national goals.

== Crisis ==
After the publication a storm broke loose. Wyndham publicly denied knowledge of the scheme and disavowed Home Rule in any guise, though MacDonnell let it be known that he had informed him. Wyndham later claimed he mislaid his letter. The whole matter developed into the "Devolution Crisis of 1904–5", a complex affair, involving political intrigue and personal drama. The reports became quickly less significant than the scandal that the Unionist administration in Dublin Castle, headed by Wyndham and Dudley, had apparently “gone native” and succumbed to home rule. Dudley made open avowal of his sympathies and wish to see Ireland governed in accordance with Irish ideas. When in fact it actually seemed they had sought to govern Ireland through confidential conversations and so defuse the Home Rule movement. Despite his denials, it is likely that Wyndham tacitly encouraged the debate on devolution in August, and it is possible that he even involved Tim Healy MP in an effort to broaden the reformists base.

Both the mainstream Conservative Party and the Ulster Unionists for whom the Association was a Trojan Horse for home rule, sensed political treachery, the Irish party held outside the centrist consultations. John Dillon MP, the Irish party deputy leader, who believed that the party could maintain its hold upon the country only if it remained pledged absolutely to Home Rule, and those other nationalists such as Michael Davitt, who thought like him, had taken to the field against what Dillon called 'Dunraven and his crowd', and savagely repelled his movement towards a national unity that would embrace all classes and creeds, Joe Devlin MP telling his constituents "they were not going to seek the co-operation of a few aristocratic nobodies".

== Dispelled ==
In March Wyndham, hounded by Unionist MPs, fell from office for having broken faith in Unionism. He retired in May 1905 driven into political oblivion by a union of angry loyalists and nationalists, including Dillon, which helped to precipitate a schism which lasted the life of the Home Rule movement. Wyndham's successor Walter Long MP pursued tighter administrative enforcement and MacDonnell was confined to a subordinate role. It was a severe blow to the hopes of O’Brien and Dunraven for further advancing the spirit of conciliation.

During the “devolution crisis” Ulster Unionists were so outraged that the head of the Civil Service in Dublin Castle, MacDonnell, a Catholic appointed by Wyndham, was involved in the devolution plan to run Ireland through elected councils, that they set up the Ulster Unionist Council, later important in organising unionist resistance to the Government of Ireland Act 1914.

O'Brien remained firmly convinced that the only way forward to achieving All-Ireland self-government lay in co-operation with the Dunraven reformists. In September 1905 when his newspaper The Irish People reappeared it carried in its second number the manifesto of the Irish Reform Association, calling for a new conference to deal with the west, with evicted tenants, a Labourers' Bill and improved finances of the Wyndham act. O'Brien called on the Irish Party to confer with them, Dillon describing this as subordinating the party to Dunraven and Healy, the Association then fading from the political scene after the failure of the Irish Council Bill which O'Brien viewed as a step in the right direction, or "Home Rule by instalments", to reappear in a different constellation in 1909 as O’Brien’s All-for-Ireland League.

The Dunraven group had their own Irish patriotism, seeing home rule was inevitable. But they were atypical of their caste and never came to terms with the mass politics driving Irish nationalism and Ulster Unionism.

== See also ==
- Irish Council Bill, a similar proposal developed by MacDonnell in 1907
