= Irish Council Bill =

The Irish Council Bill (or Irish Councils Bill; (Note: The official name was "Irish Council Bill". The plural "Councils" was common "both to Irish Nationalists and to Unionists". The Spectator said this was used "maliciously ... as though [the bill] were a mere measure of County Councils". William O'Brien alleged that the opposing Freeman's Journal used the plural to raise the spectre of the Partition of Ireland, with separate councils for unionist Ulster and the rest of Ireland.) long title A Bill to provide for the Establishment and functions of an Administrative Council in Ireland and for other purposes connected therewith) was a bill introduced and withdrawn from the UK Parliament in 1907 by the Campbell-Bannerman administration. It proposed the devolution of power, without Home Rule, to Ireland within the United Kingdom of Great Britain and Ireland. A partly elected Irish Council would take control of many of the departments thitherto administered by the Dublin Castle administration, and have limited tax-raising powers. The bill was introduced by Augustine Birrell, the newly appointed Chief Secretary for Ireland, on 7 May 1907. It was rejected by the United Irish League (UIL) at a conference in Dublin on 21 May, which meant the Irish Parliamentary Party (IPP) aligned to the UIL would oppose it in Parliament. Henry Campbell-Bannerman announced on 3 June that the government was dropping the bill, and it was formally withdrawn on 29 July.

== Political background ==
In 1893, the Second Home Rule Bill was rejected by the House of Lords. Whereas Irish nationalists like the IPP and UIL wanted full Home Rule with a legislature, this was opposed by Irish unionists, who also opposed any devolution scheme that might evolve into Home Rule. The Irish Reform Association and Sir Antony MacDonnell, the Under-Secretary for Ireland, unsuccessfully proposed a devolution scheme in 1904–1905. In a speech in Stirling in November 1905, Henry Campbell-Bannerman, about to take office as Liberal prime minister, promised "an instalment of representative control" for Ireland while implying no Home Rule. In 1906 James Bryce as Chief Secretary for Ireland began work with MacDonnell on a bill along the lines of the Stirling speech. When IPP leaders John Dillon and John Redmond were apprised of it, they were "as much alienated by the secrecy surrounding Bryce's scheme as shocked by the inadequacy of its proposals". Birrell replaced Bryce as Chief Secretary in 1907, and improved relations with IPP leaders. Edward Blake was involved in negotiating revisions to the draft bill with Dillon and Redmond. Originally, MacDonnell proposed that two-thirds of the Irish Council would be indirectly elected by the county councils; as introduced, it was to be three-quarters elected by popular vote.

William O'Brien, a nationalist outside the IPP, supported both the 1904 devolution scheme and the 1907 bill as a step in the right direction, or "Home Rule by instalments". The IPP MPs were initially uncertain whether to oppose the bill outright or seek amendments to it. They voted for the first reading on 7 May, Redmond saying, "if this measure fulfilled certain conditions I laid down we should consider it an aid to Home Rule. I do not know whether it does or not till I have examined it." Dillon was sympathetic but the sudden death of his wife removed him from public debate. The Roman Catholic church in Ireland opposed what it viewed as increased state interference in education. Joseph Devlin and the Ancient Order of Hibernians also opposed it. The Irish Trades Union Congress opposed the proposed council as "a constitutional cripple, more likely than otherwise to hamper and irritate industrial improvement in Ireland". T. W. Russell, head of the "Russellite Unionists", supported the bill and alleged most unionists opposed it because it would end Protestant Ascendancy in the senior ranks of the Irish Civil Service. (Note: The Civil Service Commissioners enforced fair open recruitment to the British civil service but did not operate in Ireland.) The antipathy within the UIL and from nationalists more generally forced Redmond's hand and he proposed the rejection motion at the UIL convention, which was overwhelmingly carried

MacDonnell retired shortly after the bill's failure. The Liberal Party decided there was no workable middle ground between the Union status quo and Home Rule, and put aside attempts to address Ireland's constitutional status. It was after the 1910 election and the Parliament Act 1911 that the Asquith ministry returned to the issue with the Third Home Rule Bill. Conor Mulvagh suggests the 1907 bill's failure fed into a current of disillusion and malaise in the IPP that opened the way for more advanced nationalist alternatives like Sinn Féin. William O'Brien wrote in 1923, "It is now obvious enough that, had the Irish Council Bill been allowed to pass, the Partition of Ireland would never have been heard of." The Spectator countered that unionists would never have been reconciled to the 1907 scheme.

== Provisions ==
The Irish Council was to have 107 members, with a term of office of three years (four years for the initial Council):

- 82 members elected under the same franchise as the Local Government (Ireland) Act 1898, which applied to most men and some women. The 82 constituencies were based on the 103 Irish Westminster constituencies, except that county borough boundaries took priority over parliamentary borough boundaries, and constituencies with small populations were merged.
- 24 members appointed, in the first instance, by the King and, subsequently, by the Lord Lieutenant
- The Under-Secretary was an ex-officio member
- The Chief Secretary was not a member but had the right to attend and speak at proceedings.

The departments of the Irish administration to be transferred to the control of the council were:

- Local Government Board for Ireland
- Department of Agriculture and Technical Instruction for Ireland
- Congested Districts Board for Ireland
- Commissioners of Public Works in Ireland
- Inspector of Reformatory and Industrial Schools
- Registrar-General
- Commissioners of National Education in Ireland
- Intermediate Education Board for Ireland
- Estates Commissioners (a function of the Irish Land Commission as successor to the Encumbered Estates' Court)

The possibility was provided for future transfer of authority for:

- Loan Fund Board
- Royal Irish Academy of Music
- Irish National Gallery
- Royal Hibernian Academy
- Commissioner of Valuation and Boundary Surveyor
- Commissioners of Education in Ireland (for endowed schools)
- Commissioners of Irish Lights
- Inspectors of Lunatic Asylums

The council would also have some financial powers, with a separate "Irish Treasury" and "Irish Fund". Joseph V. O'Brien describes these as "paltry".

The bill would also have abolished the prohibition on Roman Catholics serving as Lord Lieutenant of Ireland. (Note: This abolition was ultimately effected by the Government of Ireland Act 1920.)
