= Thomas Joseph Healy =

Irish solicitor and politician

Thomas Joseph Healy (1854–1925) was an Irish solicitor and politician.

Born in Bantry, County Cork, he was the older brother of Tim Healy and Maurice Healy, both of whom, like him, became MPs for the Irish Parliamentary Party. He became a solicitor in 1888.

In a by-election in 1892, he was elected unopposed in a by-election in the constituency of North Wexford. He remained as member until the general election of 1900.

== Endnotes ==
Parliament of the United Kingdom
Preceded by John Redmond	Member of Parliament for North Wexford; 1892 – 1900	Succeeded by Thomas Esmonde
