= Richard Power (Parnellite MP) =

Irish politician

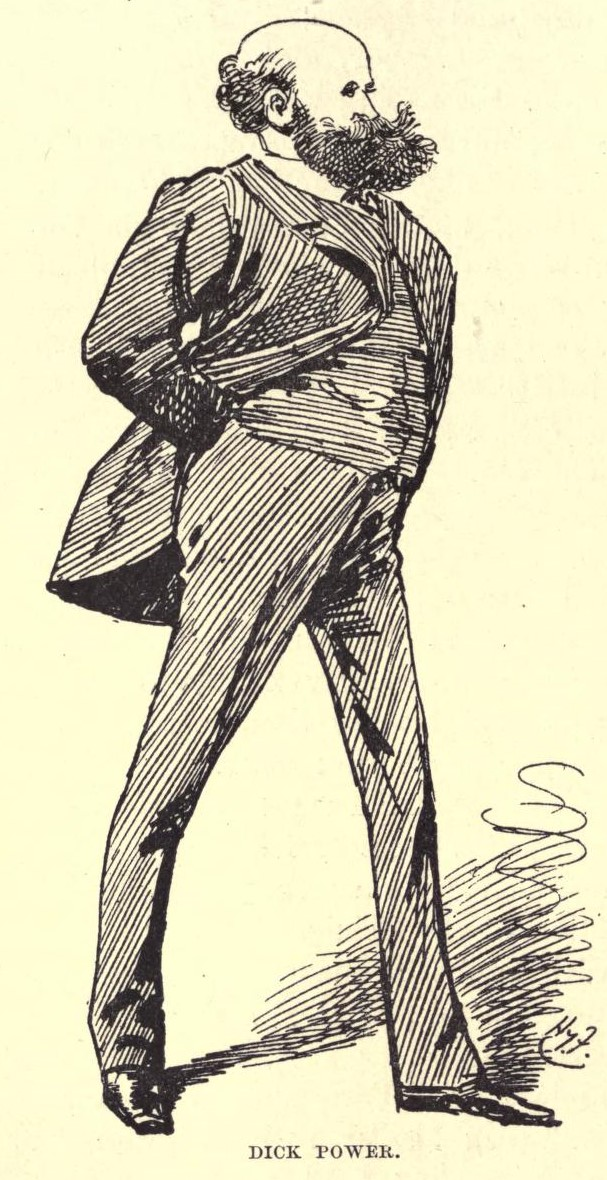
Caricature of Richard 'Dick' Power, by Harry Furniss.

Richard Power (1851 – 29 November 1891) was an Irish nationalist politician and MP in the House of Commons of the United Kingdom of Great Britain and Ireland and as member of the Home Rule League and the Irish Parliamentary Party represented Waterford City from 6 February 1874 until his death at the early age of 40, in 1891.

He was first elected in the 1874 United Kingdom general election as a candidate of the Home Rule League, standing with Major Purcell O'Gorman, who was the other member elected. He was re-elected in 1880, then stood successfully for the Irish Parliamentary Party in the elections of 1885 and 1886.

He served as Mayor of Waterford in 1886 and 1887.

He held the position of Irish Whip in parliament from 1878 and performed a key role in coordinating MPs in carrying out Parnell's highly disciplined pressure on the Liberal and Conservative parties over Home Rule.

Power was a major supporter of Charles Stewart Parnell during his leadership crisis after the Katharine O'Shea divorce controversy. Despite this, he remained popular on both sides of the party. He was reported to have caught a chill at Parnell's funeral, which left his lungs weak. He was married only a few days before his death.

== Notes ==
Parliament of the United Kingdom
Preceded by Ralph Bernal Osborne; James Delahunty	Member of Parliament for Waterford City; 1874 – 1891; With: Purcell O'Gorman to 1880; Edmund Leamy 1880–85	Succeeded by John Redmond
