= John Redmond =

Irish politician (1856–1918)

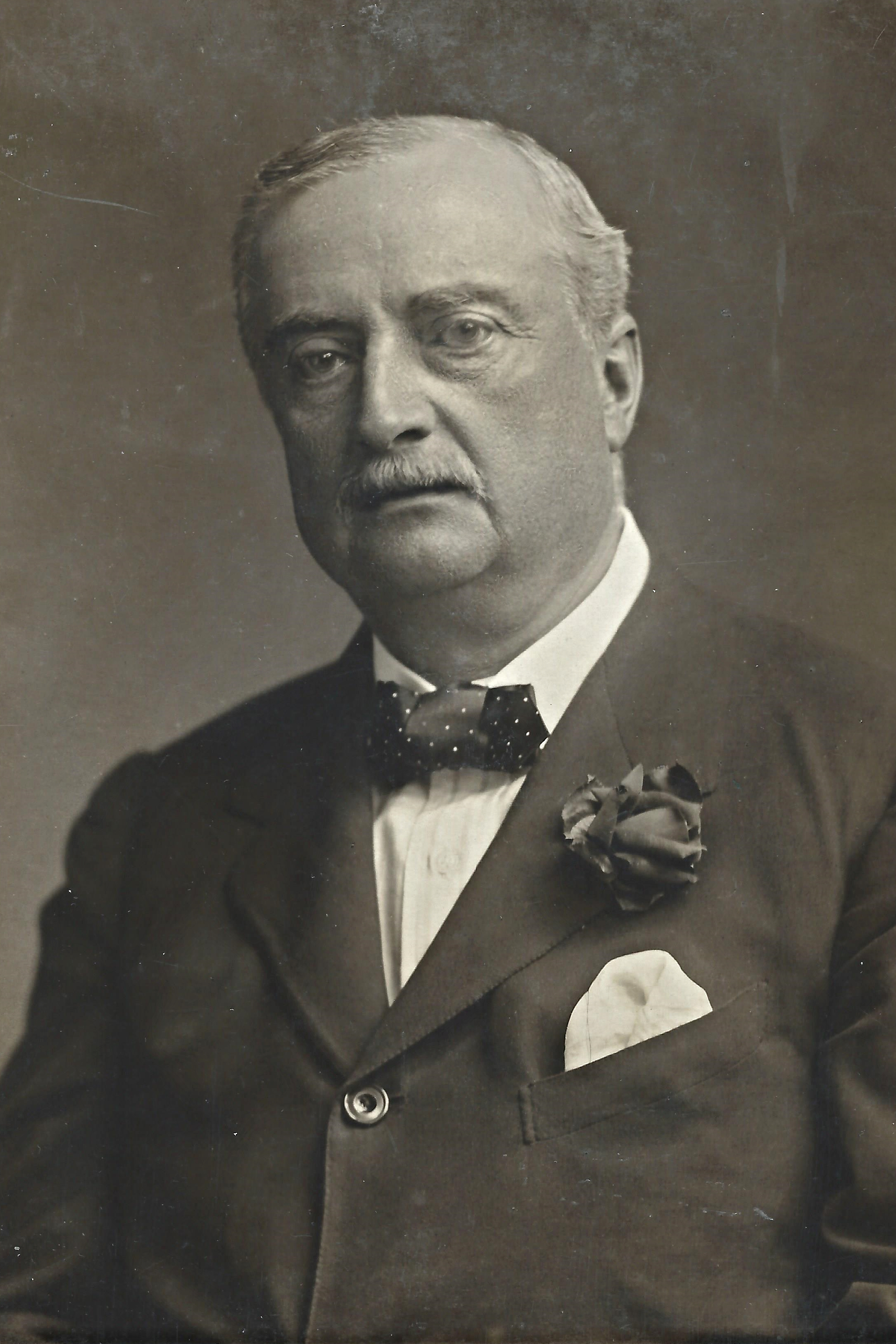
- Redmond, c. 1909

Leader of the Irish Parliamentary Party
- In office 6 February 1900 – 6 March 1918
- Preceded by: Charles Stewart Parnell
- Succeeded by: John Dillon

Member of Parliament for Waterford City
- In office 23 December 1891 – 6 March 1918
- Preceded by: Richard Power
- Succeeded by: William Redmond

Member of Parliament for North Wexford
- In office 24 November 1885 – 5 November 1891
- Preceded by: Constituency established
- Succeeded by: Thomas Joseph Healy

Member of Parliament for New Ross
- In office 31 January 1881 – 24 November 1885
- Preceded by: Joseph William Foley
- Succeeded by: Constituency abolished

Personal details
- Born: 1 September 1856 Kilrane, County Wexford, Ireland
- Died: 6 March 1918 (aged 61) London, England
- Party: Irish Parliamentary
- Spouses: Johanna Dalton (m. 1883; died 1889); Ada Beesley (m. 1899)
- Children: 3, including William
- Education: Trinity College Dublin
- Profession: Barrister

John Edward Redmond (1 September 1856 – 6 March 1918) was an Irish nationalist politician, barrister, and MP in the House of Commons of the United Kingdom. He was best known as leader of the moderate Irish Parliamentary Party (IPP) from 1900 until his death in 1918. He was also the leader of the paramilitary organisation the Irish National Volunteers (INV).

He was born to an old prominent Catholic family in rural Ireland; several relatives were politicians. He took over control of the minority IPP faction loyal to Charles Stewart Parnell when he died in 1891. Redmond was a conciliatory politician who achieved the two main objectives of his political life: party unity and, in September 1914, the passing of the Government of Ireland Act 1914. The Act granted limited self-government to Ireland, within the United Kingdom. However, implementation of Home Rule was suspended on the outbreak of the First World War. Redmond called on the National Volunteers to join Irish regiments of the New British Army and support the British and Allied war effort to restore the "freedom of small nations" on the European continent, thereby to also ensure the implementation of Home Rule after a war that was expected to be of short duration. However, after the Easter Rising of 1916, Irish public opinion shifted in favour of militant republicanism and full Irish independence, so that his party lost its dominance in Irish politics.

== Family influences and background ==
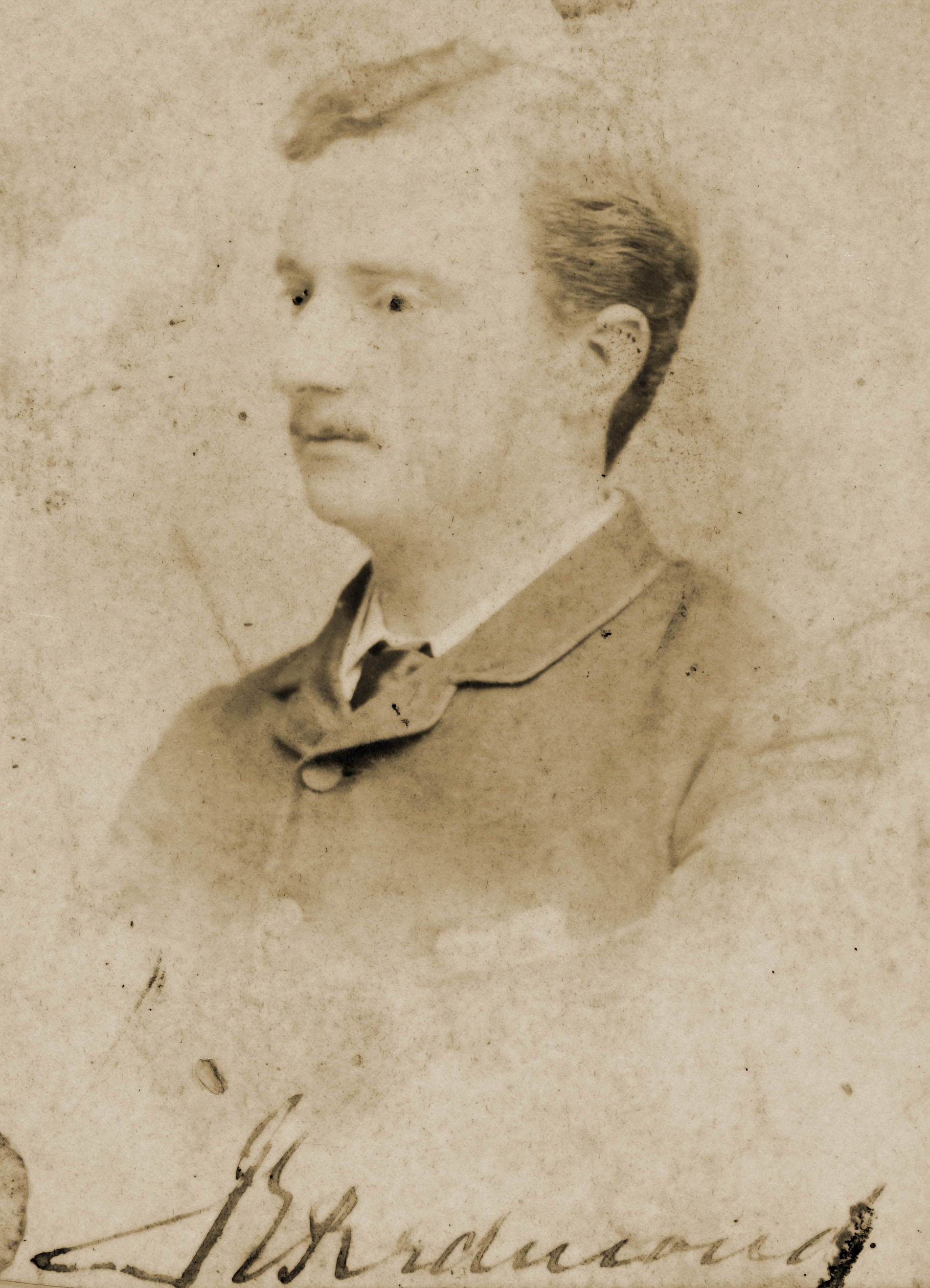
John Edward Redmond, Brisbane, 1883

John Edward Redmond (the younger) was born at Ballytrent House, Kilrane, County Wexford, his grandfather's old family mansion. He was the eldest son of William Archer Redmond, MP by Mary, daughter of General Hoey, the brother of Francis Hoey, heir of the Hoey seat, Dunganstown Castle, County Wicklow.

For over seven hundred years the Redmonds had been a prominent Catholic gentry family in County Wexford and Wexford town. They were one of the oldest Hiberno-Norman families, and had for a long time been known as the Redmonds of 'The Hall', which is now known as Loftus Hall. His more immediate family were a remarkable political dynasty themselves. Redmond's grand uncle, John Edward Redmond, was a prominent banker and businessman before entering Parliament as a member for Wexford constituency in 1859; his statue stands in Redmond Square, Wexford town. After his death in 1866, his nephew, William Archer Redmond, this John Redmond's father, was elected to the seat and soon emerged as a prominent supporter of Isaac Butt's new policy for home rule. John Redmond was the brother of Willie Redmond, MP for Wexford and East Clare, and the father of William Redmond a TD for Waterford, whose wife was Bridget Redmond, later also a TD for Waterford.

Redmond's family heritage was more complex than that of most of his nationalist political colleagues. His mother came from a Protestant and unionist family; although she had converted to Catholicism on marriage, she never converted to nationalism. His uncle General John Patrick Redmond, who had inherited the family estate, was created CB for his role during the Indian mutiny; he disapproved of his nephew's involvement in agrarian agitation of the 1880s. John Redmond boasted of his family involvement in the 1798 Wexford Rebellion; a "Miss Redmond" had ridden in support of the rebels, a Father Redmond was hanged by the yeomanry, as was a maternal ancestor, William Kearney.

== Education and early career ==
As a student, young John exhibited the seriousness that many would soon come to associate with him. Educated by the Jesuits at Clongowes Wood College, he was primarily interested in poetry and literature, played the lead in school theatricals and was regarded as the best speaker in the school's debating society. After finishing at Clongowes, Redmond attended Trinity College Dublin to study law, but his father's ill health led him to abandon his studies before taking a degree. In 1876 he left to live with his father in London, acting as his assistant in Westminster, where he developed more fascination for politics than for law. He first came into contact with Michael Davitt on the occasion of a reception held in London to celebrate the release of the famous Fenian prisoner. As a clerk in the House of Commons, he increasingly identified himself with the fortunes of Charles Stewart Parnell, one of the founders of the Irish Land League and a noted obstructionist in the Commons.

== Political profession and marriage ==
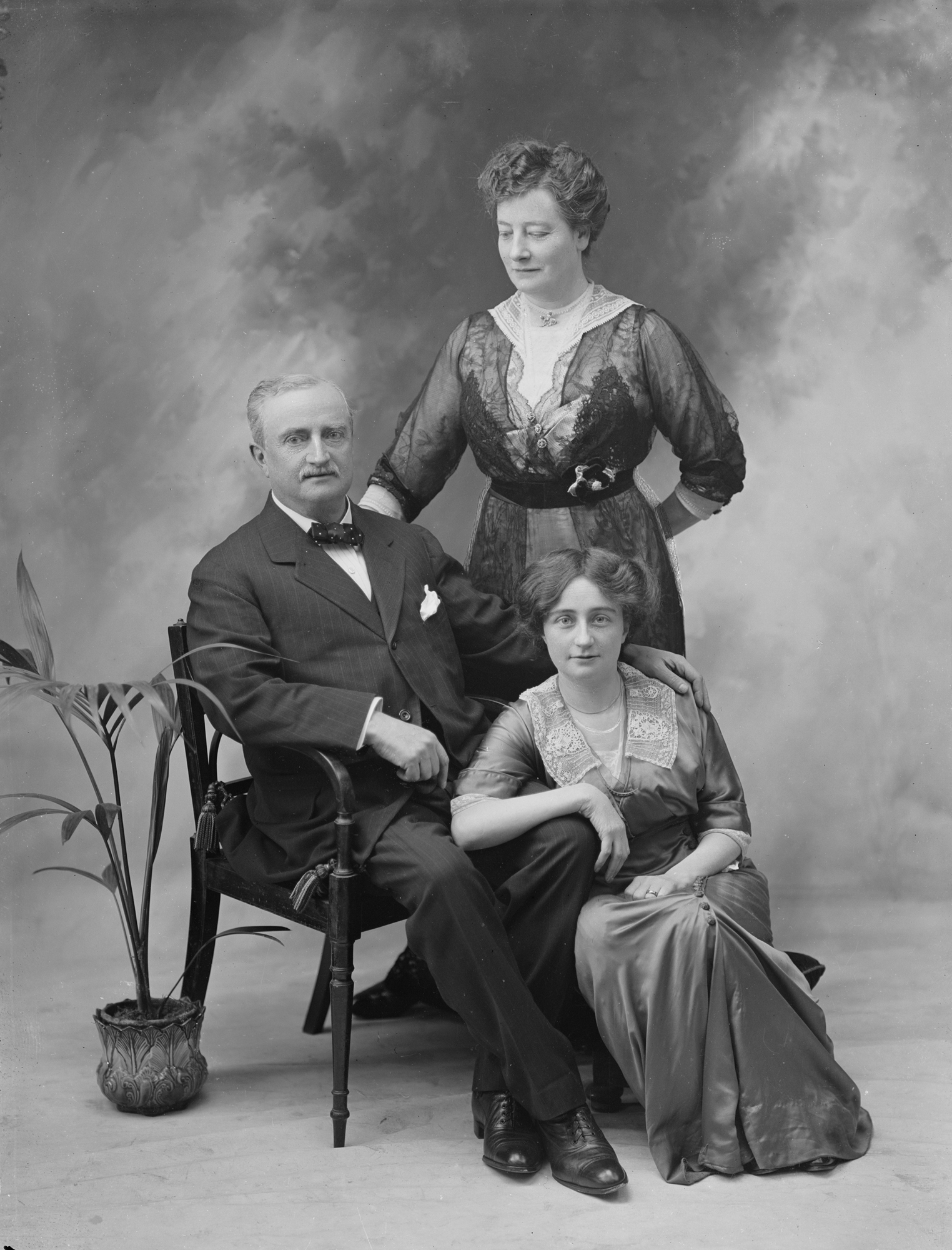
Studio portrait of Mr and Mrs Redmond and (possibly) Johanna Redmond their daughter. Circa 1914.

Redmond first attended political meetings with Parnell in 1879. Upon his father's death later in 1880, he wrote to Parnell asking for adoption as the Nationalist Party (from 1882 the Irish Parliamentary Party) candidate in the by-election to fill the open seat, but was disappointed to learn that Parnell had already promised the next vacancy to his secretary Tim Healy. Nevertheless, Redmond supported Healy as the nominee, and when another vacancy arose, this time in New Ross, he won the election unopposed as the Parnellite candidate for the seat. On election (31 January 1881), he rushed to the House of Commons, made his maiden speech the next day amid stormy scenes following the arrest of Michael Davitt, then a Land League leader, and was ejected from the Commons all on the same evening. He served as MP for New Ross from 1881 to 1885, for North Wexford from 1885 to 1891 and for Waterford City from 1891 until his death in 1918.

By the time of Redmond's election, the Land League conflict was by now at a turbulent stage. Early in 1882, he and his brother Willie were sent to Australia on a fundraising mission which was a success in both political and personal terms; in 1883 he and his brother married into the prosperous Irish-Australian Dalton family, and became friends with James Dalton and whom he spent much of his time with. His marriage was short-lived but happy: his wife Johanna died early in 1889 after bearing him three children. He also travelled in 1884, 1886 and 1904 to the US, where he was to use more extreme language but found his contact with Irish-American extremism daunting. His Australian experience, on the other hand, had a strong influence on his political outlook, causing him to embrace an Irish version of Liberal Imperialism and to remain anxious to retain Irish representation and Ireland's voice at Westminster even after the implementation of home rule. During the debate which followed Gladstone's conversion to Home Rule in 1886, he declared:

"As a Nationalist, I do not regard as entirely palatable the idea that forever and a day Ireland's voice should be excluded from the councils of an empire which the genius and valour of her sons have done so much to build up and of which she is to remain".

In 1899 Redmond married his second wife, Ada Beesley, an English Protestant who, after his death, converted to Catholicism.

== Leader of the Parnellite party ==
Having belatedly become a barrister by completing his terms at the King's Inns, Dublin, being called to the Irish bar in 1887 (and to the English bar a year later), Redmond busied himself with agrarian cases during the Plan of Campaign. In 1888, following a strong and conceivably intimidatory speech, he received five weeks' imprisonment with hard labour. A loyal supporter of Parnell, Redmond—like Davitt—was deeply opposed to the use of physical force and was committed to political change by constitutional means, campaigning constitutionally for Home Rule as an interim form of All-Ireland self-government within the United Kingdom.

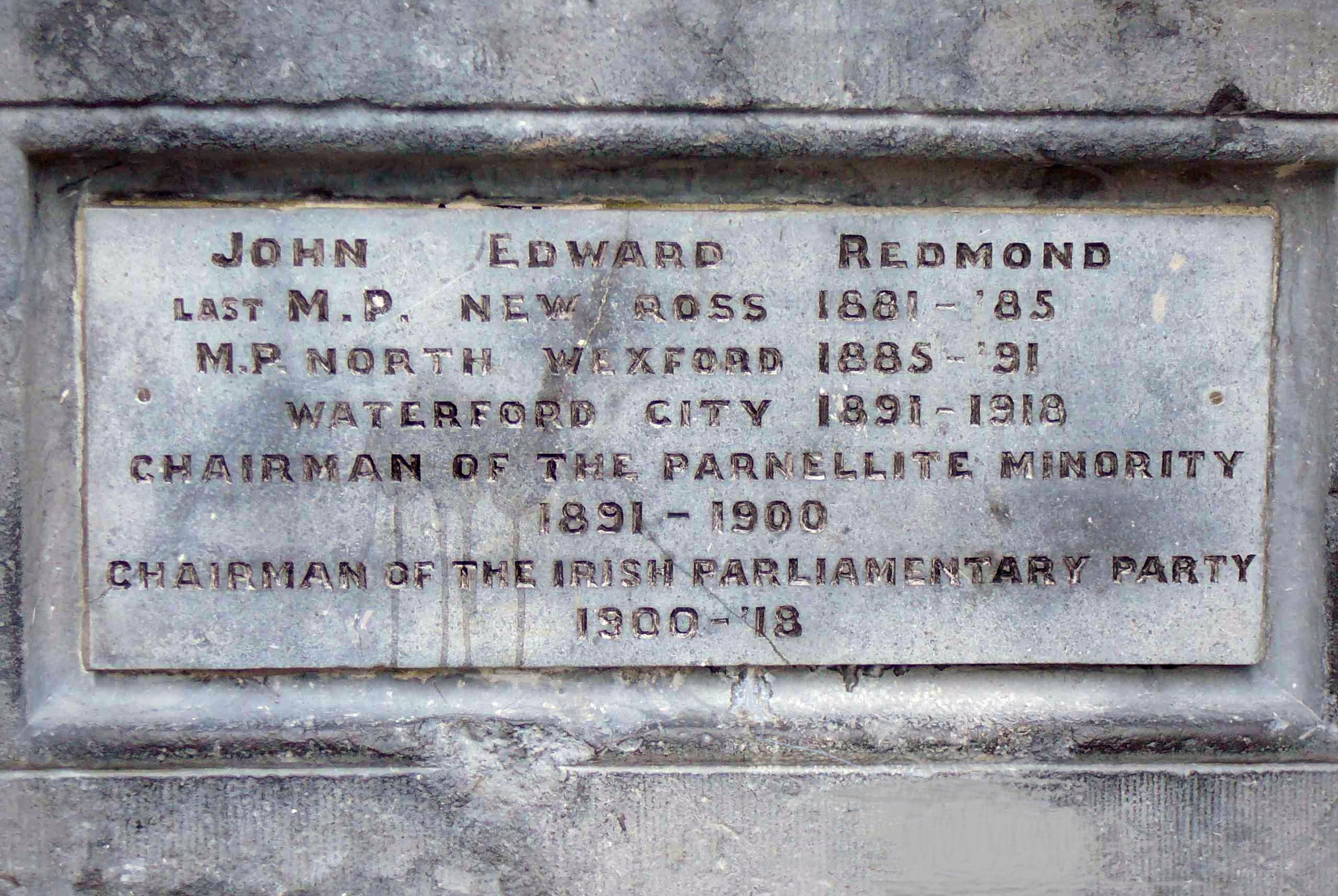
John Redmond plaque, Redmond Square, base of the Redmond monument, Wexford

In November 1890 the Irish Parliamentary Party split over Parnell's leadership when his long-standing adultery with Katharine O'Shea was revealed in a spectacular divorce case. Redmond stood by Parnell and worked to keep the minority faction active. When Parnell died in 1891, Redmond became MP for Waterford and took over leadership of the Parnellite faction of the split party. Redmond lacked Parnell's oratory and charisma but did demonstrate both his organisational ability and his considerable rhetorical skills. He raised funds for the Parnell Monument in Dublin.

The larger anti-Parnellite group formed the Irish National Federation (INF) under John Dillon. After 1895 the Conservatives and Liberal Unionists, who were opposed to Home Rule, controlled Parliament. Redmond supported the Unionist Irish Secretary Gerald Balfour programme of Constructive Unionism, while advising the Tory Government that its self-declared policy of "killing Home Rule with kindness" would not achieve its objective. The Unionists bought out most of the Protestant landowners, thereby reducing rural unrest in Ireland. Redmond dropped all interest in agrarian radicalism and, unlike the mainstream nationalists, worked constructively alongside Unionists, such as Horace Plunkett, in the Recess Committee of 1895. It led to the establishment of a department of agriculture in 1899. He further argued that the land reforms and democratisation of elected local government under the Local Government (Ireland) Act 1898 would in fact stimulate demands for Home Rule rather than dampen them, as was the case.

== Home Rule and the Liberals ==
When on 6 February 1900, through the initiative of William O'Brien and his United Irish League (UIL), the INL and the INF re-united again within the Irish Parliamentary Party, Redmond was elected its chairman (leader), a position he held until his death in 1918—a longer period than any other nationalist leader, except Éamon de Valera and Daniel O'Connell. However, Redmond, a Parnellite, was chosen as a compromise due to the personal rivalries between the anti-Parnellite Home Rule leaders. Therefore, he never had as much control over the party as his predecessor, his authority and leadership a balancing act having to contend with such powerful colleagues as John Dillon, William O'Brien, Timothy Healy and Joseph Devlin. He nevertheless led the Party successfully through the September 1900 general election.

Then followed William O'Brien's amicable and conciliatory Land Conference of 1902 involving leading landlords under Lord Dunraven and tenant representatives O'Brien, Redmond, Timothy Harrington and T. W. Russell for the Ulster tenants. It resulted in the enactment of the unprecedented Land Purchase (Ireland) Act 1903. Redmond first sided with O'Brien's new strategy of "conciliation plus business", but refused O'Brien's demand to rebuke Dillon for his criticism of the Act, leading to O'Brien's resignation from the party in November 1903. Redmond approved of the unsuccessful 1904 devolution proposals of the Irish Reform Association. Despite their differences, Redmond and Dillon made a good team: Redmond, who was a fine speaker and liked the House of Commons, dealt with the British politicians, while Dillon, who disliked London, the Commons and their influence on Irish politicians, stayed in Ireland and kept Redmond in touch with national feelings.

Though government had been dominated by the Conservative Party for more than a decade, the new century saw much favourable legislation enacted in Ireland's interest. An electoral swing to the Liberal Party in the 1906 general election renewed Redmond's opportunities for working with government policy. The Liberals, however, did not yet back his party's demands for full Home Rule, which contributed to a renewal of agrarian radicalism in the ranch wars of 1906–1910. Redmond's low-key and conciliatory style of leadership gave the impression of weakness but reflected the problem of keeping together a factionalised party. He grew in stature after 1906 and especially after 1910. As far as Redmond was concerned, the Home Rule movement was interested in promoting Irish nationality within the British Empire, but it was also a movement with a visceral antipathy to the English and their colonies.

Redmond initially supported the introduction of the Liberals' 1907 Irish Council Bill, which was also supported by O'Brien and IPP members who initially voted for the first reading. Redmond said, "if this measure fulfilled certain conditions I laid down we should consider it an aid to Home Rule". When this was rejected by Dillon and the UIL, Redmond, fearing another Party split, quietly endured Dillon's dictate of distancing the Irish Party from any understanding with the landlord class.

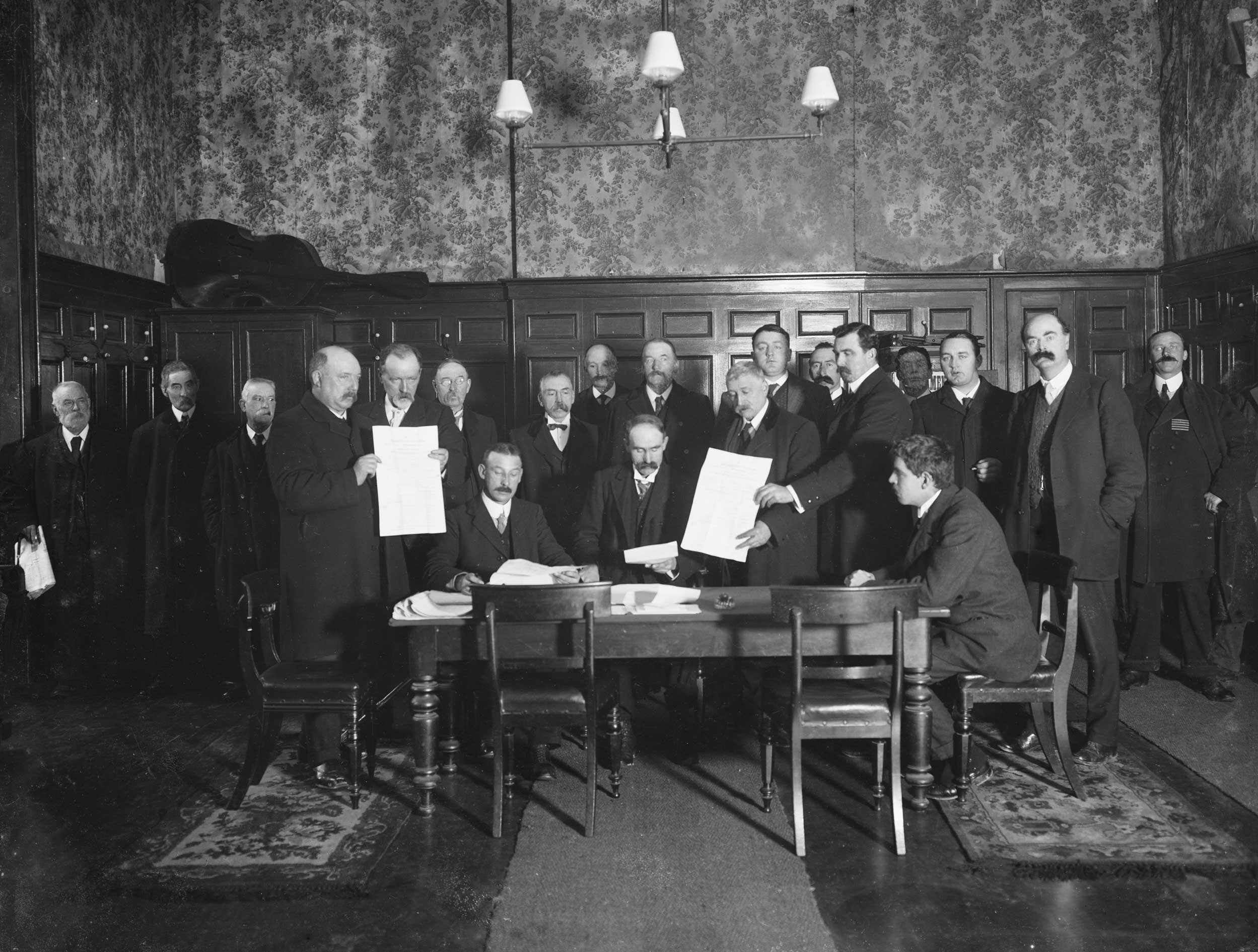
Scene at the Waterford Court House when John Redmond, M.P. was nominated, 1910.

John Redmond satirised by the suffragette movement in 1913. Redmond had said he would never support female suffrage under any circumstances.

The first election of January 1910 changed everything to Redmond's advantage, returning a hung parliament in which his parliamentary party held the balance of power at Westminster; this marked a high point in his political career. The previous year, the Lords had blocked the budget of the Chancellor of the Exchequer, David Lloyd George. (Note: The Lords passed the budget in 1910, deeming the election result to constitute an electoral mandate.) Redmond's party supported the Liberals in introducing a bill to curb the power of the House of Lords, which, after a second election in December 1910 had generated an almost identical result to the one in January, became the Parliament Act 1911. Irish Home Rule (which the Lords had blocked in 1893) now became a realistic possibility. Redmond used his leverage to persuade the Liberal government of H. H. Asquith to introduce the Third Home Rule Bill in April 1912, to grant Ireland national self-government. The Lords no longer had the power to block such a bill, only to delay its enactment for two years. Home Rule had reached the pinnacle of its success and Redmond had gone much further than any of his predecessors in shaping British politics to the needs of the Irish.

Redmond was an opponent of votes for women and had abstained on votes regarding the topic. On 1 April 1912 he informed a delegation of the Irish Women's Franchise League that he would not support giving women the vote if home rule was granted. Redmond's opposition to female suffrage drew the ire of the suffragettes leading to the defacing of a statue of Redmond in 1913 by a suffragette protestor.

For all its reservations, the Home Rule Bill was for Redmond the fulfilment of a lifelong dream. "If I may say so reverently", he told the House of Commons, "I personally thank God that I have lived to see this day". But Asquith did not incorporate into the bill any significant concessions to Ulster Unionists, who then campaigned relentlessly against it. Nonetheless, by 1914 Redmond had become a nationalist hero of Parnellite stature and could have had every expectation of becoming head of a new Irish government in Dublin.

== Home rule passed ==
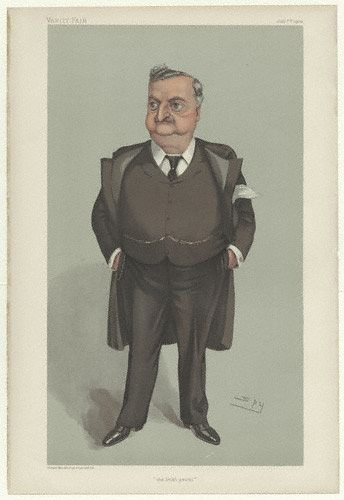
Redmond caricatured by Spy for Vanity Fair, 1904

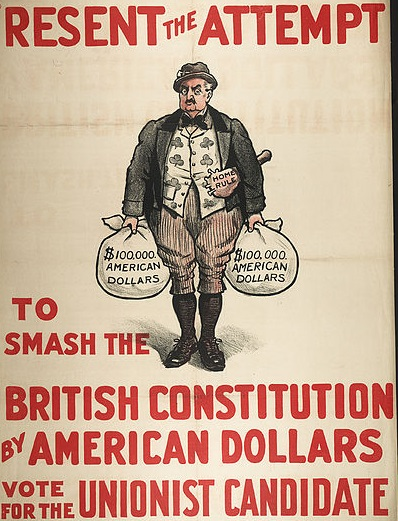
Anti-Redmond Unionist Party poster

But like most leaders in the nationalist scene, not least his successors in the republican scene, he knew little of Ulster or the intensity of Unionist sentiment against home rule. His successor, John Dillon, claimed that Redmond had removed all the obstacles to Irish unity except those of the Ulster unionists. He had persuaded British public and political opinion of all hues of its merits. William O'Brien and his dissident All-for-Ireland League warned in similar vein, that the volatile Northern Ireland situation was left unresolved.

Home rule was vehemently opposed by many Irish Protestants, the Irish Unionist Party and Ulster's Orange Order, who feared domination in an overwhelmingly Catholic state. Unionists also feared economic problems, namely that the predominantly agricultural Ireland would impose tariffs on British goods, leading to restrictions on the importation of industrial produce; the main location of Ireland's industrial development was Ulster, the north-east of the island, the only part of Ireland dominated by unionists. Most unionist leaders, especially Sir Edward Carson—with whom Redmond always had a good personal relationship, based on shared experiences at Trinity College Dublin and the Irish bar—threatened the use of force to prevent home rule, helped by their supporters in the British Conservative Party. Redmond misjudged them as merely bluffing. In October 1913 speech Redmond made his feelings on partition clear:

Ireland is a unit. It is true that within the bosom of a nation there is room for diversities of the treatment of government and of administration, but a unit Ireland is and Ireland must remain...The two-nation theory is to us an abomination and a blasphemy.

Carson predicted that if any attempt to coerce any part of Ulster were made, "a united Ireland within the lifetime of anyone now living would be out of the question".

During negotiations early in 1914, two lines of concessions for the Carsonites were formulated: autonomy for Ulster in the form of 'Home Rule within Home Rule', which Redmond was inclined to, or alternatively the Lloyd George scheme of three years as the time limit for temporary exclusion. Redmond grudgingly acquiesced to this as "the price of peace". From the moment Carson spurned 'temporary' exclusion, the country began a plunge into anarchy. The situation took on an entirely new aspect in late March with the Curragh Mutiny together with the spectre of civil war on the part of the Ulster Covenanters, who formed the Ulster Volunteers to oppose Home Rule, forcing Redmond to then in July take over control of their counterpart, the Irish Volunteers, established in November 1913 to enforce Home Rule.

Asquith conceded to the Lords' demand to have the Government of Ireland Act 1914, which had passed all stages in the Commons, amended to temporarily exclude the six counties of Northern Ireland, which for a period would continue to be governed by London, not Dublin, and to later make some special provision for them. A Buckingham Palace Conference failed to resolve the entangled situation. Strongly opposed to the partition of Ireland in any form, Redmond and his party reluctantly agreed to what they understood would be a trial exclusion of now six years; under Redmond's aspiration that "Ulster will have to follow", he was belatedly prepared to concede a large measure of autonomy to it to come in.

Redmond's confidence was strong and communicated itself to Ireland. But whatever could be said to shake confidence was said by William O'Brien and Tim Healy, who denounced the bill as worthless when linked to the plan of even temporary partition and declared that, whatever the Government might say at present, "we had not yet reached the end of their concessions". On the division, they and their All-for-Ireland League abstained, so that the majority dropped from 85 to 77. Using the Parliament Act 1911, the Lords was deemed to have passed the act; it received royal assent in September 1914.

== European conflict intervenes ==
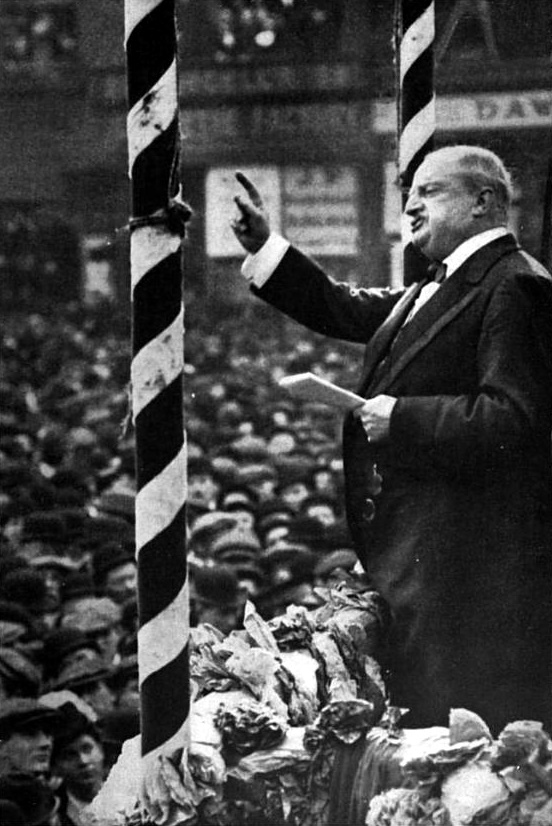
John Redmond, circa 1916

On the outbreak of World War I in August 1914, the Government of Ireland Act 1914 was suspended for the duration of the conflict. Judged from the perspective of that time, Redmond had won a form of triumph: he had secured the passing of Home Rule with the provision that the implementation of the measure would be delayed "not later than the end of the present war", which "would be bloody but short-lived". His Unionist opponents were confused and dismayed by the passing of the Government of Ireland Act 1914 and by the absence of any definite provisions for the exclusion of Ulster. In two speeches delivered by Redmond in August and September 1914, deemed as critical turning points in the Home Rule process, he stated:

"Armed Nationalist Catholics in the South will be only too glad to join arms with the armed Protestant Ulstermen in the North. Is it too much to hope that out of this situation there may spring a result which will be good, not merely for the Empire, but good for the future welfare and integrity of the Irish nation?"

Under these circumstances, any political bargaining might well have been disastrous to Home Rule. Redmond desperately wanted and needed a rapid enactment of the Government of Ireland Act 1914, and undoubtedly his words were a means to that end. He called on the country to support the Allied and British war effort and Britain's commitment under the Triple Entente; this was a calculated response to the situation principally in the belief that the attained measure of self-government would be granted in full after the war and to be in a stronger position to stave off a final partition of Northern Ireland. His added hope was that the common sacrifice by Irish nationalists and Unionists would bring them closer together, but above all that nationalists could not afford to allow Ulster Unionists to reap the benefit of being the only Irish to support the war effort, when they spontaneously enlisted in their 36th (Ulster) Division. He said:

Let Irishmen come together in the trenches and risk their lives together and spill their blood together, and I say there is no power on earth that when they come home can induce them to turn as enemies upon one another.

Redmond also argued that "No people can be said to have rightly proved their nationhood and their power to maintain it until they have demonstrated their military prowess". He praised Irish soldiers, "with their astonishing courage and their beautiful faith, with their natural military genius […] offering up their supreme sacrifice of life with a smile on their lips because it was given for Ireland".

Speaking at Maryborough on 16 August 1914, he addressed a 2,000-strong assembly of Irish Volunteers, some armed, saying he had told the British Parliament that:

for the first time in the history of the connection between England and Ireland, it was safe to-day for England to withdraw her armed troops from our country and that the sons of Ireland themselves, North and South, Catholic and Protestant, and whatever the origin of their race might have been – Williamite, Cromwellian, or old Celtic – standing shoulder to shoulder, would defend the good order and peace of Ireland, and defend her shores against any foreign foe.

== Nationalists split ==
Redmond's appeal, however, to the Irish Volunteers to also enlist caused them to split; a large majority of 140,000 followed Redmond and formed the National Volunteers, who enthusiastically enlisted in Irish regiments of the 10th and 16th (Irish) Divisions of the New British Army, while a minority of around 9,700 members remained as the original Irish Volunteers. Redmond believed that the German Empire's hegemony and military expansion threatened the freedom of Europe and that it was Ireland's duty, having achieved future self-government:

"to the best of her ability to go where ever the firing line extends, in defence of right, of freedom and of religion in this war. It would be a disgrace forever to our country otherwise". (Woodenbridge speech to the Irish Volunteers, 20 September 1914)

Redmond requested the War Office to allow the formation of a separate Irish Brigade as had been done for the Ulster Volunteers, but Britain was suspicious of Redmond. His plan was that post-war the Irish Brigade and National Volunteers would provide the basis for an Irish Army, capable of enforcing Home Rule on reluctant Ulster Unionists. Eventually he was granted the gesture of the 16th (Irish) Division which, with the exception of its Irish General William Hickie at first had mostly English officers, unlike the Ulster Division which had its own reserve militia officers, since most of the experienced officers in Ireland had already been posted to the 10th (Irish) Division and most Irish recruits enlisting in the new army lacked the military training to act as officers. Redmond's own son, William Redmond, enlisted, as did his own brother Major Willie Redmond MP, despite being aged over 50 years. They belonged to a group of five Irish MPs who enlisted, the others J. L. Esmonde, Stephen Gwynn, and D. D. Sheehan as well as former MP Tom Kettle.

Redmond was and is still criticised for having encouraged so many Irish to fight in the Great War. However the Irish historian J. J. Lee wrote:

"Redmond could have tactically done nothing other than support the British war campaign; . . . nobody committed to Irish unity could have behaved other than Redmond did at the time. Otherwise, there would be no chance whatever of a united Ireland, in which Redmond passionately believed".

== Easter Rising and aftermath ==
During 1915 Redmond felt secure in his course and that the path was already partly cleared for Home Rule to be achieved without bloodshed. He was supported by continued by-election successes of the IPP, and felt strong enough to turn down the offer of a cabinet seat, which would have offset Carson's appointment to the cabinet but would have been unpopular in Ireland. Even in 1916, he felt supremely confident and optimistic despite timely warnings from Bonar Law of an impending insurrection. Redmond did not expect the 1916 Easter Rising, which was staged by the remaining Irish Volunteers and the Irish Citizen Army, led by a number of influential republicans, under Patrick Pearse. Pearse, who had in 1913 stood with Redmond on the same platform where the Rising now took place, had at that time praised Redmond's efforts in achieving the promise of Home Rule. Redmond later acknowledged that the Rising was a shattering blow to his lifelong policy of constitutional action. It equally helped fuel republican sentiment, particularly when General Maxwell executed the leaders of the Rising, treating them as traitors in wartime.

On 3 May 1916, after three of the Rising's leaders had been executed—Pearse, Thomas MacDonagh and Tom Clarke—Redmond said in the House of Commons: "This outbreak, happily, seems to be over. It has been dealt with firmness, which was not only right, but it was the duty of the Government to so deal with it". However, he urged the Government "not to show undue hardship or severity to the great masses of those who are implicated [in the Rising]". Redmond's plea, and John Dillon's, that the rebels be treated leniently were ignored.

There followed Asquith's attempt to introduce Home Rule in July 1916. David Lloyd George, recently appointed Secretary of State for War, was sent to Dublin to offer this to the leaders of the Irish Party, Redmond and Dillon. The scheme revolved around partition, officially a temporary arrangement, as understood by Redmond. Lloyd George, however, gave the Ulster leader Carson a written guarantee that Ulster would not be forced in. His tactic was to see that neither side would find out before a compromise was implemented. A modified Government of Ireland Act had been drawn up by the Cabinet on 17 June. The act had two amendments enforced by Unionists on 19 July: permanent exclusion of Ulster, and a reduction of Ireland's representation in the Commons. Lloyd George informed Redmond of this on 22 July 1916, and Redmond accused the government of treachery. This was decisive to the future fortunes of the Home Rule movement; the Lloyd George debacle of 22 July finished the constitutional party, overthrew Redmond's power and left him utterly demoralised. It simultaneously discredited the politics of consent and created the space for radical alternatives. Redmond, after 1916 was increasingly eclipsed by ill-health, the rise of Sinn Féin and the growing dominance of Dillon within the Irish Party.

June 1917 brought a severe personal blow to Redmond when his brother Willie died in action on the front at the onset of the Battle of Messines offensive in Flanders; his vacant seat in East Clare was then won in July by Éamon de Valera, the most senior surviving commandant of the Easter insurgents. It was one of three by-election gains by Sinn Féin, the small separatist party that had played no part in the Rising, but was wrongly blamed by Britain and the Irish media. It was then taken over by surviving Rising leaders, under de Valera and the IRB. Just at this time, Redmond made a desperate effort to broker a new compromise with Irish unionists, when he accepted Lloyd George's proposal for a national convention to resolve the problem of Home Rule and draft a constitution for Ireland.

== Defeat and death ==
An Irish Convention of around one hundred delegates sat from July and ended in March 1918. Up until December 1917, Redmond used his influence to have a plan which had been put forward by the Southern Unionist leader Lord Midleton, accepted. It foresaw All-Ireland Home Rule with partial fiscal autonomy (until after the war, without customs and excise). All sides, including most Ulster delegates, wavered towards favouring agreement. Already ailing while attending the convention, his health permanently affected by an accident in 1912, Redmond also suffered assault on the street in Dublin by a crowd of young Sinn Féin supporters on his way to the convention, which included Todd Andrews. On 15 January, just when he intended to move a motion on his proposal to have the Midleton plan agreed, some nationalist colleagues—the prominent Catholic Bishop O'Donnell and MP Joseph Devlin—expressed doubts. Rather than split the nationalist side, he withdrew his motion. A vital chance was lost.

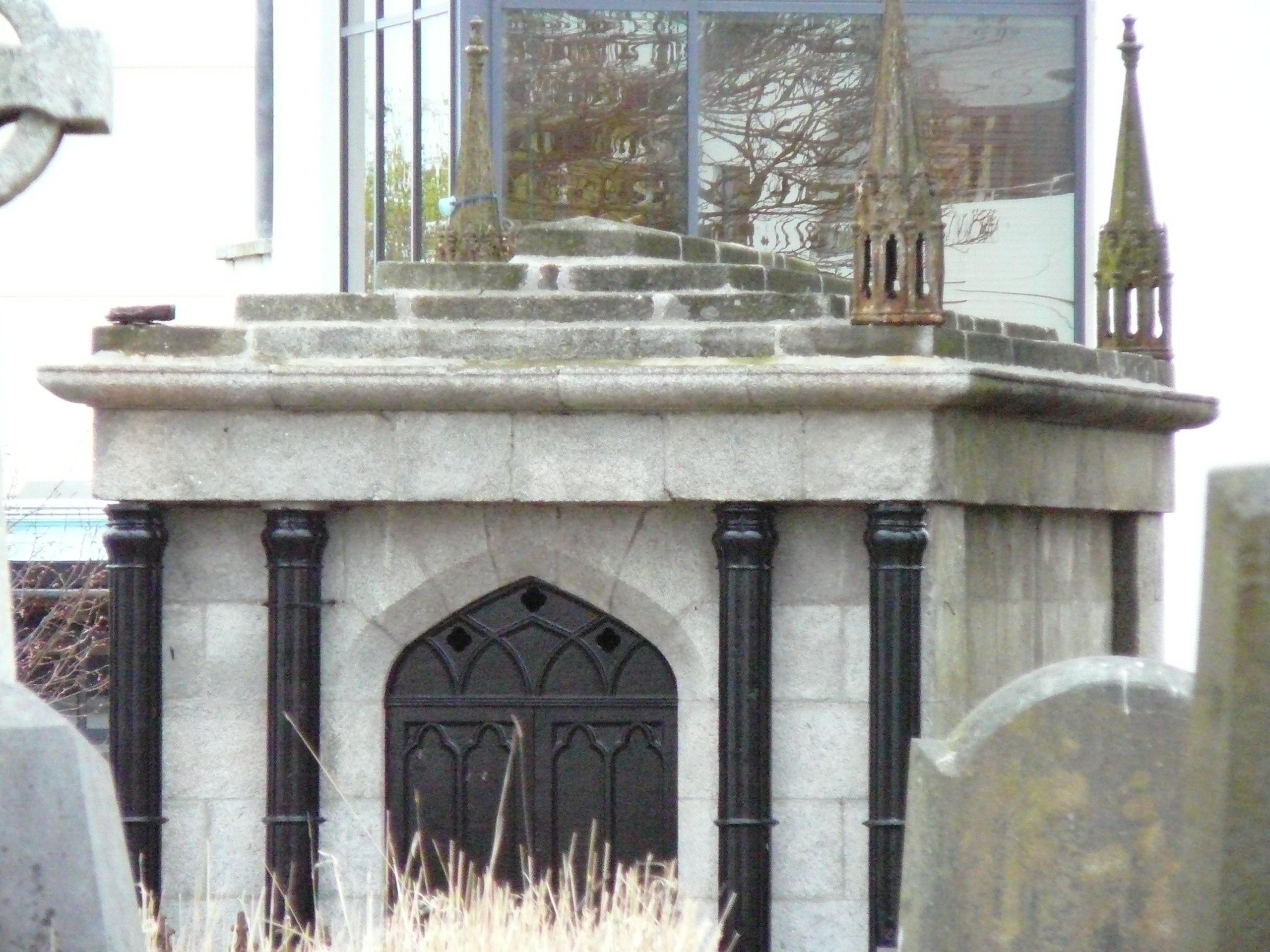
Redmond family vault (in a hollow, partially restored, top relief missing, unnamed) seen from entrance gate.

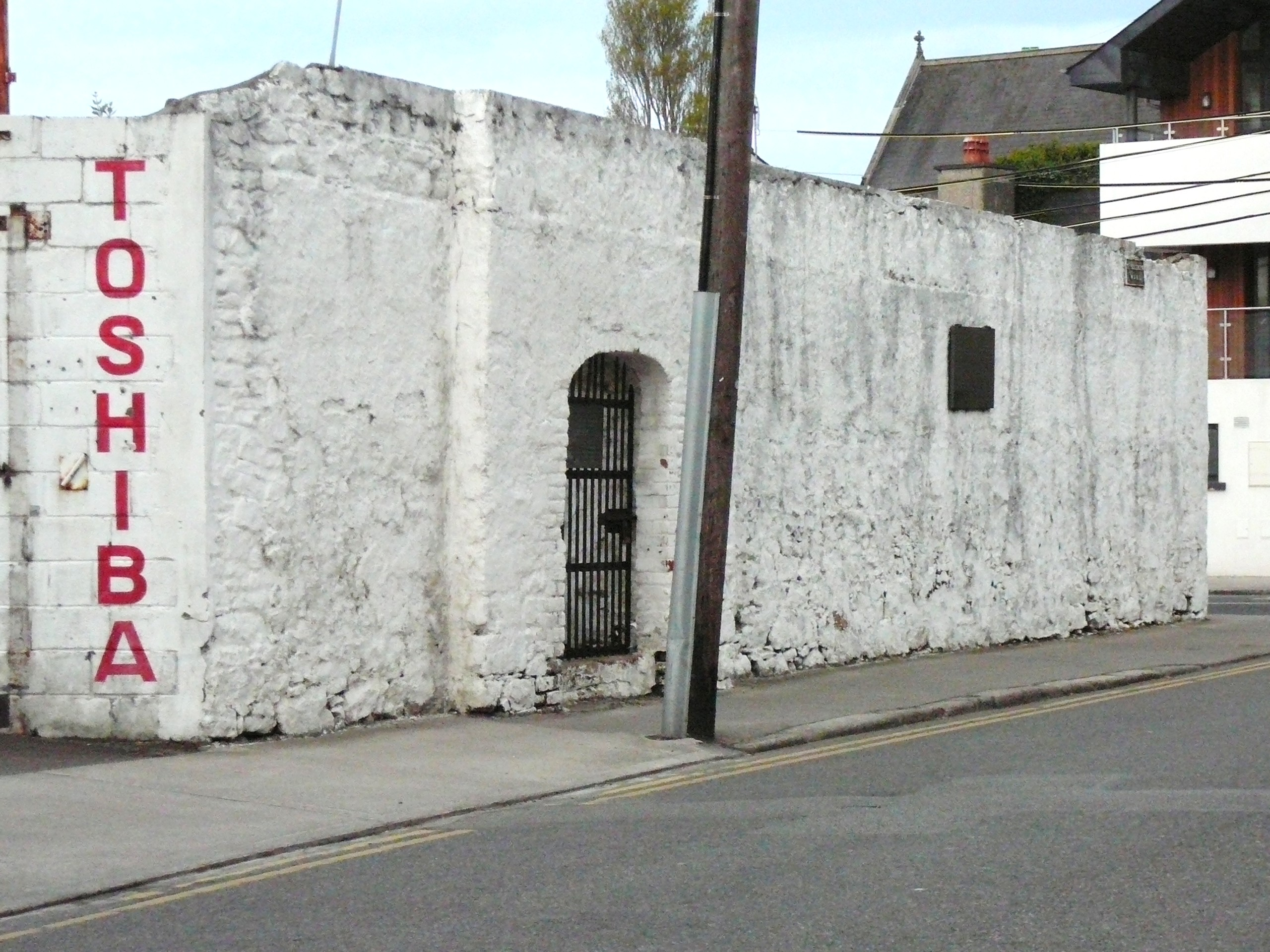
John Redmond is interred in St. John's cemetery, Upper St John's Street, Wexford town.

He ended his participation by saying that under the circumstances he felt he could be of no further use to the Convention in the matter. His final word in the convention was the tragic one – Better for us never to have met than to have met and failed. Late in February the malady from which he was suffering grew worse. He left Dublin for London knowing that a settlement from the convention was impossible. An operation in March 1918 to remove an intestinal obstruction appeared to progress well at first, but then he suffered heart failure. He died a few hours later at a London nursing home on 6 March 1918. One of the last things he said to the Jesuit priest who was with him to the end, was, Father, I am a broken-hearted man. At the convention, his last move was an adoption of O’Brien's policy of accommodating Unionist opposition in the North and in the South. It was too late. Had he joined O’Brien ten years before and carried the Irish Party with him, it is possible that Ireland's destiny would have been settled by evolution.

Condolences and expressions of sympathy were widely expressed. After a funeral service in Westminster Cathedral his remains were interred, as requested in a manner characteristic of the man, in the family vault at the old Knight Hospitallers churchyard of Saint John's Cemetery, Wexford town, among his own people rather than in the traditional burial place for Irish statesmen and heroes in Glasnevin Cemetery. The small, neglected cemetery near the town centre is kept locked to the public – his vault, which had been in a dilapidated state, has been only partially restored by Wexford County Council.

== Party's demise ==
Redmond was succeeded in the party leadership by John Dillon and spared the experience of further political setbacks when after the German spring offensive of April 1918, Britain, caught in a desperate war of attrition, attempted to introduce conscription in Ireland linked with implementation of Home Rule. The Irish Nationalists led by Dillon walked out of the House of Commons and returned to Ireland to join in the widespread resistance and protests during the resulting conscription crisis.

The crisis boosted Sinn Féin so that in the December general election it won the vast majority of seats, leaving the Nationalist Party with only six seats for the 220,837 votes cast (21.7%) (down from 84 seats out of 103 in 1910). The party did not win a proportionate share of seats because the election was not run under a proportional representation system, but on the 'first past the post' British electoral system. Unionists, on the other hand, won 26 seats for 287,618 (28.3%) of votes, whereas Sinn Féin votes were 476,087 (or 46.9%) for 48 seats, plus 25 uncontested, totalling 73 seats. In January 1919 a Unilateral Declaration of Independence by the First Dáil attended by twenty-seven Sinn Féin members (others were in jail or unable to attend) proclaimed an Irish Republic. The subsequent parliament of the Second Dail was superseded by the establishment of the Irish Free State. The Irish Civil War followed.

Home Rule was finally implemented in 1921 under the Government of Ireland Act 1920 which introduced two Home Rule parliaments, although only adopted by the six counties forming Northern Ireland.

== Legacy and personal vision ==
John Redmond's home town of Wexford remained a strongly Redmondite area for decades afterwards. The seat of Waterford city was one of the few outside Ulster not to be won by Sinn Féin in the 1918 general election. Redmond's son William Redmond represented the city until his death in 1932. A later Irish Taoiseach John Bruton, hung a painting of Redmond, whom he regarded as his hero because of his perceived commitment to non-violence in Ireland, in his office in Ireland's Government Buildings. However, his successor Bertie Ahern replaced the painting with one of Patrick Pearse.

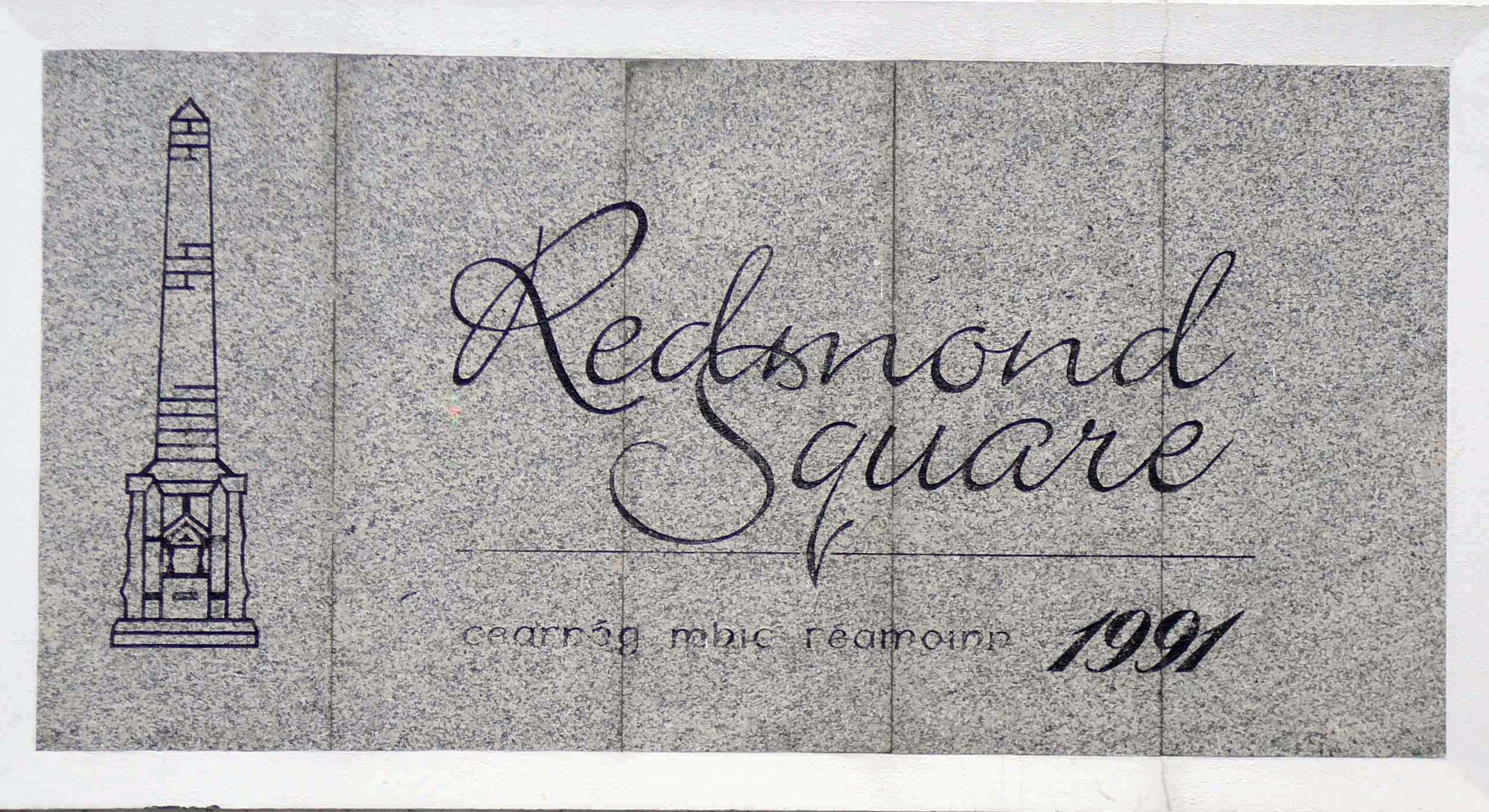
Wall plaque on the Redmond Square, Wexford

Gerry Adams described him as a "man of violence" for encouraging Irish recruitment to the British army during World War I. He also criticised supporters of Redmond such as John Bruton for ignoring his role "in sending tens of thousands of Irishmen to fight Germans and Austrians and Turks with whom Ireland had no quarrel".

Redmond's personal vision did not encompass a wholly independent Ireland. He referred to:

"that brighter day when the grant of full self-government would reveal to Britain the open secret of making Ireland her friend and helpmate, the brightest jewel in her crown of Empire".

He had above all a conciliatory agenda; in his final words in parliament he expressed "a plea for concord between the two races that providence has designed should work as neighbours together". For him, Home Rule was an interim step for All-Ireland autonomy:

"His reward was to be repudiated and denounced by a generation which had yet to learn, as they learned three years later when they were forced to accept Partition, that true freedom is rarely served by bloodshed and violence, and that in politics compromise is inevitable. Yet it can be said of John Redmond that none of Ireland's sons had ever served her with greater sincerity or nobler purpose".

== Notes, sources and citations ==
=== Sources ===
- Bew, Paul (2005). "Redmond, John Edward (1856–1918)". Oxford Dictionary of National Biography.
- — (1996). John Redmond.
- Bull, Philip (1988). "The United Irish League and the Reunion of the Irish Parliamentary Party, 1898–1900". Irish Historical Studies. 26 (101): 51–78. doi:10.1017/S0021121400009445. JSTOR 30008504.
- Finnan, Joseph P. (2004). John Redmond and Irish Unity: 1912 – 1918. Syracuse UP. ISBN 9780815630432.
- Foster, R. F. (2015). Vivid Faces: The Revolutionary Generation in Ireland, 1890–1923. National Geographic Books. ISBN 978-0393082791.
- Gwynn, Stephen (1919). John Redmond's last years. Edward Arnold.
- Gwynn, Denis (1932). The Life of John Redmond.
- Jackson, Alvin (2004). Home Rule, an Irish History 1800–2000. Phoenix Press. ISBN 0-7538-1767-5.
- — (2018). Judging Redmond and Carson. Royal Irish Academy.
- O'Connor Lysaght, D. R. (Spring 2003). "The Rhetoric of Redmondism". History Ireland: 44–49. JSTOR 27725000.
- O'Loughran, Rev. Robert (1919). Redmond's Vindication. (1919)
- McConnel, James (2010). "John Redmond and Irish Catholic Loyalism". The English Historical Review. CXXV (512): 83–111. doi:10.1093/ehr/cep410.
- Meleady, Dermot (2008). Redmond: The Parnellite. Cork University Press. ISBN 978-1-85918-423-3.
- Stewart, A.T.Q. (1979) [1967]. The Ulster Crisis, Resistance to Home Rule, 1912–14. London: Faber and Faber. ISBN 0-571-08066-9.
- Wheatley, Michael (2001). "John Redmond and federalism in 1910". Irish Historical Studies. 32 (127): 343–364. doi:10.1017/S0021121400015054. JSTOR 30007219.

=== Citations ===
Parliament of the United Kingdom
Preceded by Joseph Foley	Member of Parliament for New Ross; 1881–1885	Constituency abolished
New constituency	Member of Parliament for North Wexford; 1885–1891	Succeeded by Thomas Joseph Healy
Preceded by Richard Power	Member of Parliament for Waterford City; 1891–1918	Succeeded by William Redmond
