= Purcell O'Gorman =

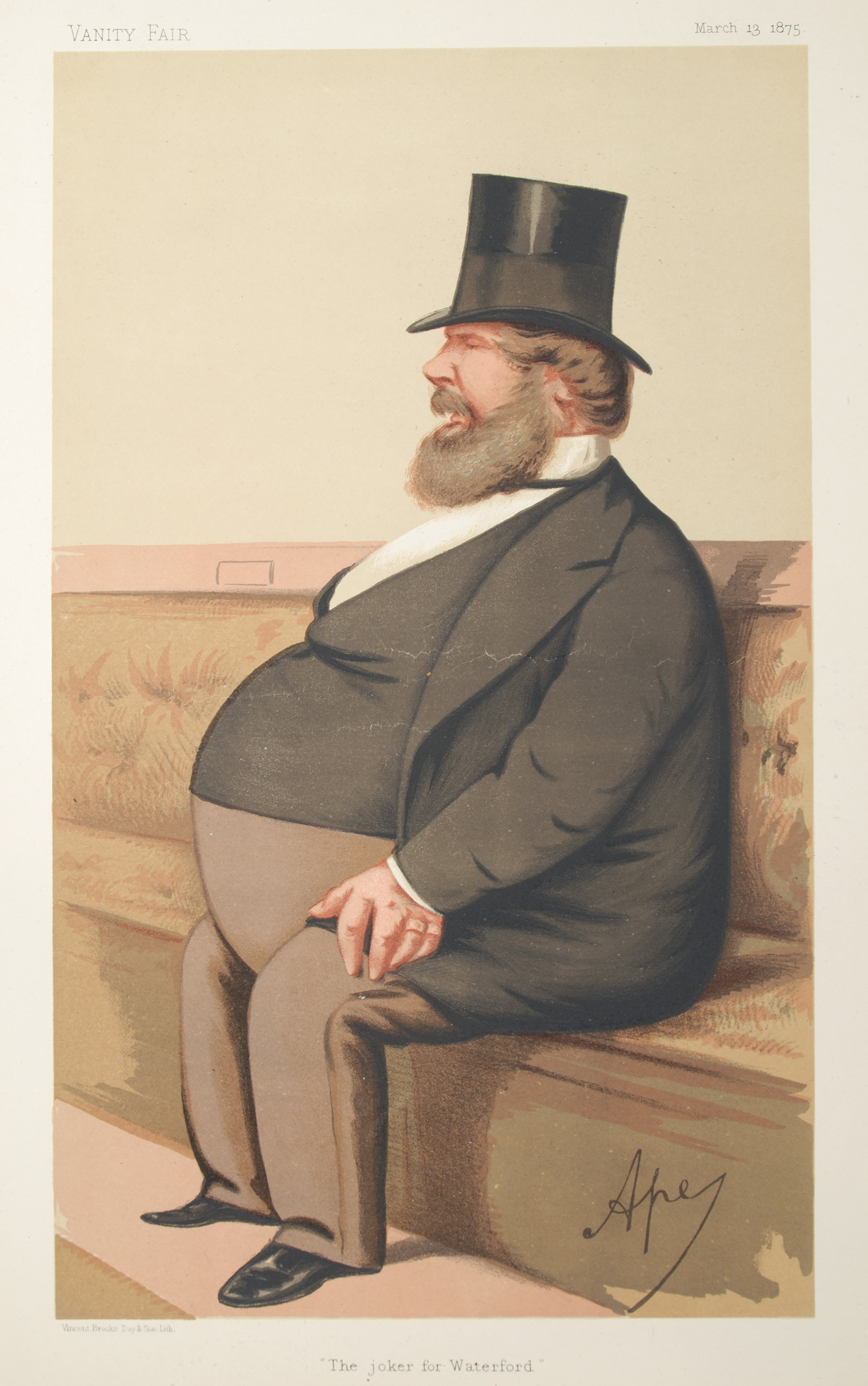
O'Gorman by "Ape" in Vanity Fair, 1875

Purcell O'Gorman (1820 – 24 November 1888) was an Irish nationalist politician and member of parliament in the House of Commons of the United Kingdom, elected as a member of the Home Rule League to represent Waterford City. He was elected only once, in the 1874 United Kingdom general election, and served until 1880.

== Life ==
A scion of the landed gentry of Ireland, but a Roman Catholic, O'Gorman was born in Kilkenny, the son of the successful barrister Nicholas Purcell O'Gorman QC, who was the Secretary of Daniel O'Connell's Catholic Association. He was educated at Clongowes, a Jesuit school, then at the age of sixteen matriculated at Trinity College Dublin. There he graduated BA in law in 1840. On 3 February 1843 he was commissioned as a Second Lieutenant into the Ceylon Rifle Regiment. On 9 December 1845 he transferred to the 90th Foot (Perthshire Volunteers) as a Lieutenant and was promoted Captain on 2 April 1852. He served in the Crimean War from 1854 to 1855, and on 17 August 1855 sold his commission.

O'Gorman served as one of Waterford's two Home Rule League members of parliament from February 1874 until 1880. In March 1875, barely a year after his election to the House of Commons, he was caricatured by "Ape" (Carlo Pellegrini) in the London Vanity Fair magazine as "The Joker for Waterford".

O'Gorman died at Springfield, County Kilkenny, in November 1888.

== Private life ==
In 1853, O'Gorman married Sarah, a daughter of Thomas Mellor, of Ashton, Lancashire, and they had one son and two daughters. They settled at Bellevue, in County Clare. In 1860 their elder daughter, Frances Alice O'Gorman, married Captain E. J. Anderson, Royal Engineers. He was later a Brigadier-General. In 1905 their younger daughter, Mary O'Gorman, became the second wife of Lt. Colonel Robert Thomas Carew, a former high sheriff of County Waterford.

== Notes ==
Parliament of the United Kingdom
Preceded by Ralph Bernal Osborne; James Delahunty	Member of Parliament for Waterford City; 1874–1880; With: Richard Power	Succeeded by Edmund Leamy; Richard Power
