= North Wexford =

Former parliamentary constituency in the United Kingdom

- Former county constituency for the House of Commons

1885–1922
- Seats: 1
- Created from: County Wexford
- Replaced by: Wexford

North Wexford was a United Kingdom Parliament constituency in Ireland, returning one Member of Parliament from 1885 to 1922.

Prior to 1885 the area was part of the County Wexford constituency. After 1922 the area was not represented in the UK Parliament.

== Boundaries ==
This constituency comprised the northern part of County Wexford.

1885–1922: The baronies of Ballaghkeen North, Ballaghkeen South, Gorey, Scarawalsh and Shelmaliere East, that part of the barony of Bantry contained within the parishes of Chapel, Clonleigh, Clonmore, Killann, Killegny, Rossdroit, St. John's, St. Mullin's, Templeludigan and Templescoby, and that part of the barony of Shelmaliere West contained within the parish of Clonmore.

== Members of Parliament ==
Election	Member	Party
1885	John Redmond	Nationalist
1892	Thomas Joseph Healy	Anti-Parnellite Nationalist
1900	Thomas Esmonde	Nationalist
1918	Roger Sweetman	Sinn Féin
1922	Constituency abolished	

== Elections ==
=== Elections in the 1880s ===
1885 general election: North Wexford
Party	Candidate	Votes	%	±%
Irish Parliamentary	John Redmond	6,531	87.7	
Irish Conservative	James Stopford	917	12.3	
Majority		5,614	75.4	
Turnout		7,448	76.2	
Registered electors		9,768		
Irish Parliamentary win (new seat)				

1886 general election: North Wexford
Party	Candidate	Votes	%	±%
Irish Parliamentary	John Redmond	Unopposed		
Registered electors		9,768		
Irish Parliamentary hold				

=== Elections in the 1890s ===
By-election, 1892: North Wexford
Party	Candidate	Votes	%	±%
Irish National Federation	Thomas Joseph Healy	Unopposed		
Registered electors		9,890		
Irish National Federation gain from Irish Parliamentary				

1892 general election: North Wexford
Party	Candidate	Votes	%	±%
Irish National Federation	Thomas Joseph Healy	5,723	86.9	N/A
Irish Unionist	John Richard Magrath	859	13.1	New
Majority		4,864	73.8	N/A
Turnout		6,582	66.6	N/A
Registered electors		9,890		
Irish National Federation gain from Irish Parliamentary		Swing	N/A	

1895 general election: North Wexford
Party	Candidate	Votes	%	±%
Irish National Federation	Thomas Joseph Healy	4,689	85.6	−1.3
Liberal Unionist	John Boursignot Falconer	786	14.4	+1.3
Majority		3,903	71.2	−2.6
Turnout		5,475	61.4	−5.2
Registered electors		8,913		
Irish National Federation hold		Swing	−1.3	

=== Elections in the 1900s ===
1900 general election: North Wexford
Party	Candidate	Votes	%	±%
Irish Parliamentary	Thomas Esmonde	2,823	71.0	−14.6
Healyite Nationalist	Thomas Joseph Healy	1,153	29.0	N/A
Majority		1,670	42.0	−29.2
Turnout		3,976	43.3	−18.1
Registered electors		9,183		
Irish Parliamentary hold		Swing	'	

1906 general election: North Wexford
Party	Candidate	Votes	%	±%
Irish Parliamentary	Thomas Esmonde	Unopposed		
Registered electors		9,010		
Irish Parliamentary hold				

=== Elections in the 1910s ===
January 1910 general election: North Wexford
Party	Candidate	Votes	%	±%
Irish Parliamentary	Thomas Esmonde	Unopposed		
Registered electors		8,835		
Irish Parliamentary hold				

December 1910 general election: North Wexford
Party	Candidate	Votes	%	±%
Irish Parliamentary	Thomas Esmonde	Unopposed		
Registered electors		8,835		
Irish Parliamentary hold				

1918 general election: North Wexford
Party	Candidate	Votes	%	±%
Sinn Féin	Roger Sweetman	10,162	58.6	New
Irish Parliamentary	Thomas Esmonde	7,189	41.4	N/A
Majority		2,973	17.2	N/A
Turnout		17,351	75.4	N/A
Registered electors		23,022		
Sinn Féin gain from Irish Parliamentary		Swing	N/A	
