= Irish Parliamentary Party =

Irish political party at Westminster, 1874–1922

- The Irish harp, along with the coat of arms of the provinces of Ireland, played a prominent role in IPP literature.
- Leader: See below
- Founder: Isaac Butt
- Founded: 1874; 152 years ago
- Dissolved: 1922; 104 years ago
- Preceded by: Home Rule League
- Succeeded by: Nationalist Party
- Ideology: Irish nationalism; Home rule; Liberalism
- Political position: Centre to centre-right
- Colours: Green

The Irish Parliamentary Party (IPP; commonly called the Irish Party or the Home Rule Party) was formed in 1874 by Isaac Butt, the leader of the Nationalist Party, replacing the Home Rule League, as official parliamentary party for Irish nationalist Members of Parliament (MPs) elected to the House of Commons at Westminster within the United Kingdom of Great Britain and Ireland up until 1918. Its central objectives were legislative independence for Ireland and land reform. Its constitutional movement was instrumental in laying the groundwork for Irish self-government through three Irish Home Rule bills.

== Origins ==
The IPP evolved out of the Home Rule League which Isaac Butt founded after he defected from the Irish Conservative Party in 1873. The League sought to gain a limited form of freedom for Ireland within the United Kingdom of Great Britain and Ireland in order to manage Irish domestic affairs in the interest of the Protestant landlord class. It was inspired by the success in the 1868 general election of William Ewart Gladstone and his Liberal Party under the slogan Justice for Ireland, in which the Liberals won 65 of the 105 Irish seats at Westminster. Gladstone said his mission was to pacify Ireland. The Irish Church Act 1869 provided for the disestablishment of the Anglican Church of Ireland, whose members were a minority in Ireland and would have largely voted Conservative. He also introduced his first land bill which led to the Landlord and Tenant (Ireland) Act 1870, implementing limited tenant rights, thereby impinging on the powers of the Irish landlords to indiscriminately evict tenant farmers. At first the Catholic hierarchy supported Gladstone supervising Irish affairs, hoping to gain financial aid for a Catholic University. But his educational programme of 1873 did not provide for a denominational university.

The Home Government Association adopted educational issues and land reform into its programme, the hierarchy then favouring a Dublin-based parliament. The increasing Catholic numbers within the association frightened off its Protestant, landlord element. The association was dissolved and Butt replaced it with the Home Rule League, formed after a conference in Dublin in November 1873. Gladstone unexpectedly called a general election in 1874, which helped bring the League to the foreground. Under the Ballot Act 1872, votes in general election were to be cast in private for the first time. The League put denominational education, land reform and release of political prisoners at the centre of the movement. It had difficulty finding reliable candidates to support its Home Rule issue, though succeeded in winning sixty Irish seats, many with ex-Liberals.

== History ==
=== Party inaugurated ===
After the 1874 general election, forty-six members assembled in Dublin and organised themselves into a separate Irish parliamentary party in the Commons. The political outlook appeared encouraging at first, but the party was unable to achieve anything, the Liberals and Gladstone having lost the election. Isaac Butt made some well-received speeches but failed to persuade any of the major parties to support bills beneficial to Ireland, nothing worthwhile reaching the statute books.

A minor group of impatient young Irish members, the genuine "Home-Rulers" distanced themselves from Butt's lack of assertiveness and, led by Charles Stewart Parnell, Joseph Biggar, John O'Connor Power, Edmund Dwyer Gray, Frank Hugh O'Donnell and John Dillon, some of whom had close connections with the Fenian movement, adopted the method of parliamentary "obstructionism" during 1876–1877, to bring Westminster out of its complacency towards Ireland by proposing amendments to almost every bill and making lengthy overnight speeches. This did not bring Home Rule closer, but helped to revitalise the Irish party. Butt considered obstructionism a threat to democracy; in practice, its greatest achievement was to help bring Parnell to the fore of the political scene. An internal struggle began between Butt's majority and Parnell's minority leading to a rift in the party; Parnell determined to obtain control of the Home Rule League.

=== Land-war mainspring ===
Parnell first worked successfully to have Fenians freed who missed out on Gladstone's earlier amnesty, including Michael Davitt. After his release in 1877, Davitt travelled to America to meet John Devoy, the leading Irish-American Fenian and raise funds. During 1878 Parnell also met with leading members of the Irish American Fenians. In October Devoy agreed to a New Departure of separating militancy from the constitutional movement in order to further its path to Home Rule. Throughout 1879 Parnell continued to campaign for land reform and when Davitt founded the Irish National Land League in October 1879 Parnell was elected president, but did not take control of it, favouring to continue to hold mass meetings. Isaac Butt died later that year and Parnell held back in grabbing control of the party. Instead he travelled to America with John Dillon on a fund raising mission for political purposes and to relieve distress in Ireland after a world economic depression slumped the sale of agricultural produce.

At the 1880 general election, sixty-four Home Rulers were elected, twenty-seven Parnell supporters, facilitating in May his nomination as leader of a divided Home Rule Party and of a country on the brink of a land war. He immediately understood that supporting land agitation was a means to achieving his objective of self-government. The Conservatives under Disraeli had been defeated in the election and Gladstone was again Prime Minister. He attempted to defuse the land question with the dual ownership Land Law (Ireland) Act 1881 which failed to eliminate tenant evictions. Parnell and his party lieutenants, William O'Brien, John Dillon, Michael Davitt, Willie Redmond, went into a bitter verbal offensive and were imprisoned in October 1881 under the Protection of Persons and Property (Ireland) Act 1881 in Kilmainham Jail for "sabotaging the Land Act", from where the No Rent Manifesto was issued calling for a national tenant farmer rent strike which was partially followed. Although the League discouraged violence, agrarian crimes increased widely.

=== Truce and treaty ===
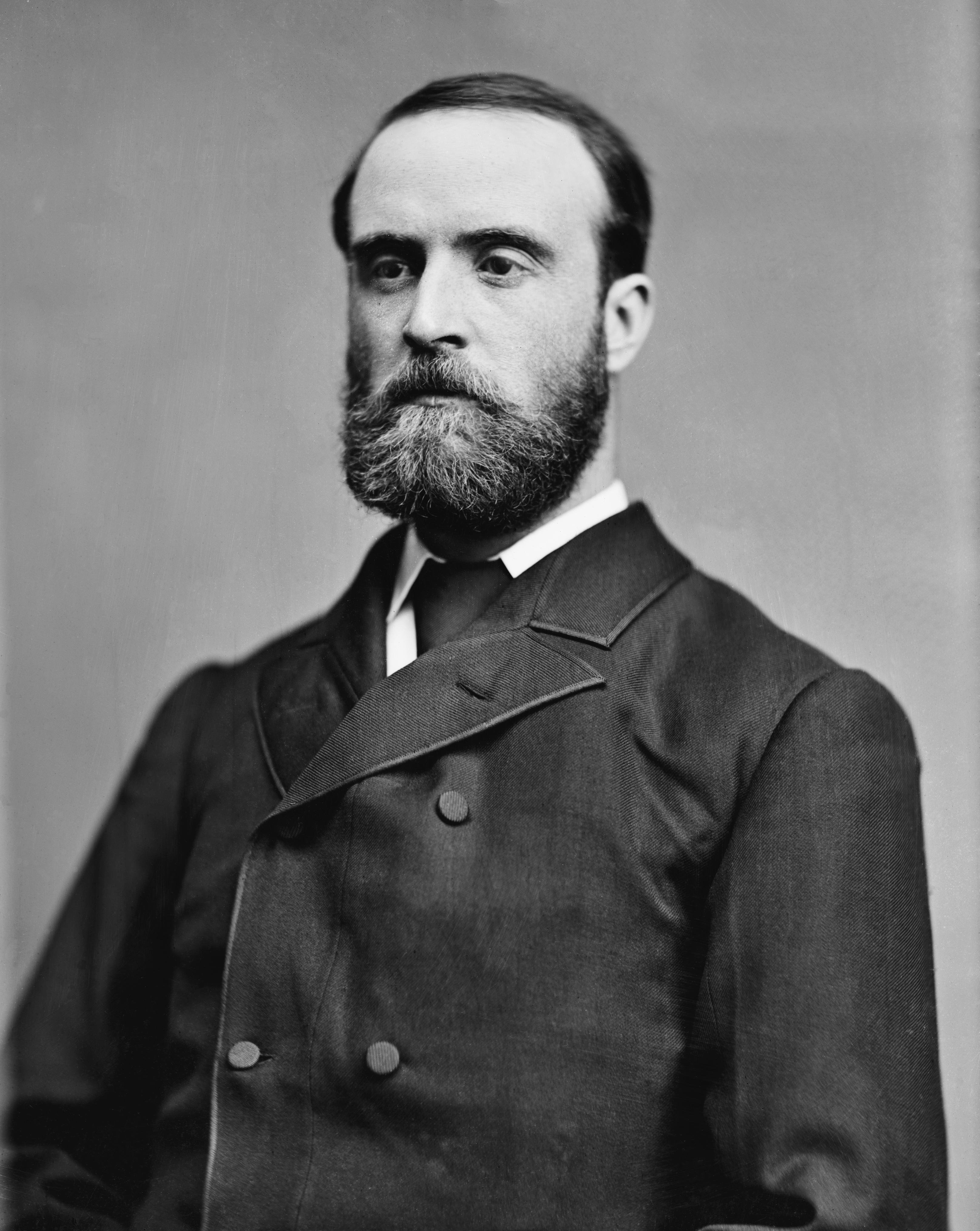
Charles Stewart Parnell, the founder of the IPP

In April 1882 Parnell moved to make a deal with the government. The settlement involved withdrawing the manifesto and undertaking to move against agrarian crime, seeing militancy would never win Home Rule. The so-called Kilmainham Treaty, a truce not dissimilar to truces to follow, marked a critical turning point in Parnell's leadership, though it resulted in losing the support of Devoy's American-Irish. However, his political diplomacy preserved the national Home Rule movement after the Phoenix Park Murders in May of the Chief Secretary for Ireland and his Under Secretary. For the next twenty years Fenians and physical-force militancy ceased to play a role in Irish politics.

With the Land League suppressed and internally fracturing, Parnell resurrected it in October as the Irish National League (INL). It combined moderate agrarianism, a Home Rule programme with electoral functions. It was hierarchical and autocratic in structure with Parnell wielding immense authority and direct parliamentary control. Parliamentary constitutionalism was the future path. The informal alliance between the new, tightly disciplined National League and the Catholic Church was one of the main factors for the revitalisation of the national Home Rule cause after 1882. Parnell saw that the explicit endorsement of Catholicism was of vital importance to the success of this venture. At the end of 1882 the organisation already had 232 branches, in 1885 increased to 592 branches. He left the day-to-day running of the League in the hands of his lieutenants Timothy Harrington as Secretary, William O'Brien editor of its newspaper United Ireland and Tim Healy.

=== Parnellism reigns ===
Parnell's new Irish Parliamentary Party emerged swiftly as a tightly disciplined—one author described it as "a regiment led by C. S. Parnell and by Michael Davitt" and on the whole, energetic body of parliamentarians with strict rules. The inauguration of the "party pledge" in 1884 decisively reinforced that each member was required to sit, act and vote with the party, one of the first instances of a whip (Richard Power) in western politics. The members were also paid stipends, or expense allowances from party funds, which helped both to increase parliamentary turnout and enabled middle-class members such as William O'Brien or later D. D. Sheehan attend parliament, long before other MPs first received state pay in 1911. The profiles of the 105 Irish MPs had changed considerably since 1868 when 69% were landlords or the sons of landlords, reduced to 47% by 1874. Those with professional backgrounds increased from 10% to 23% in the same period, by the early 1890s professionals exceeding 50%.

Now at his height Parnell pressed Gladstone to resolve the Irish Question with Home Rule, but the Liberals were divided. Parnell then sided with the Conservatives. Gladstone's second government fell, and Lord Salisbury's Conservatives formed an administration. Both parties now courted Parnell.

The result of Parnell's reforms and reorganisation were fully reflected in the general election of November–December 1885. This election was the first to be fought under the extended suffrage of the Representation of the People Act 1884. The act had increased from 220,000 to 500,000 the number of Irishmen who had a right to vote, many of whom were small farmers. The election increased the total Irish Party representation from 63 to 85 seats, which included seventeen in Ulster. In January 1886 the INL had developed to 1,262 branches and could claim to contain the vast body of Irish Catholic public sentiment. It acted not merely as an electoral committee for the Irish Party, but as local law-giver, unofficial parliament, government, police and supreme court. Parnell's personal authority in the organisation was enormous. The INL was a formidable political machine built in the traditional political culture of rural Ireland. It was an alliance of tenant farmers, shopkeepers and publicans. No one could stand against it.

The party secured a seat in the English city of Liverpool, which contains a large Irish Catholic community. T. P. O'Connor won the Liverpool Scotland seat in 1885 and retained it in every election until his death in 1929 – even after the demise of the actual party (O'Connor being returned unopposed in the elections of 1918, 1922, 1923, 1924, and 1929).

The IPP emerged from the 1885 general election holding the balance of power. The Liberals had won 335 seats, but the IPP's 86 seats were enough to keep the 249 Conservatives in power for the time being.

=== Home Rule delayed ===
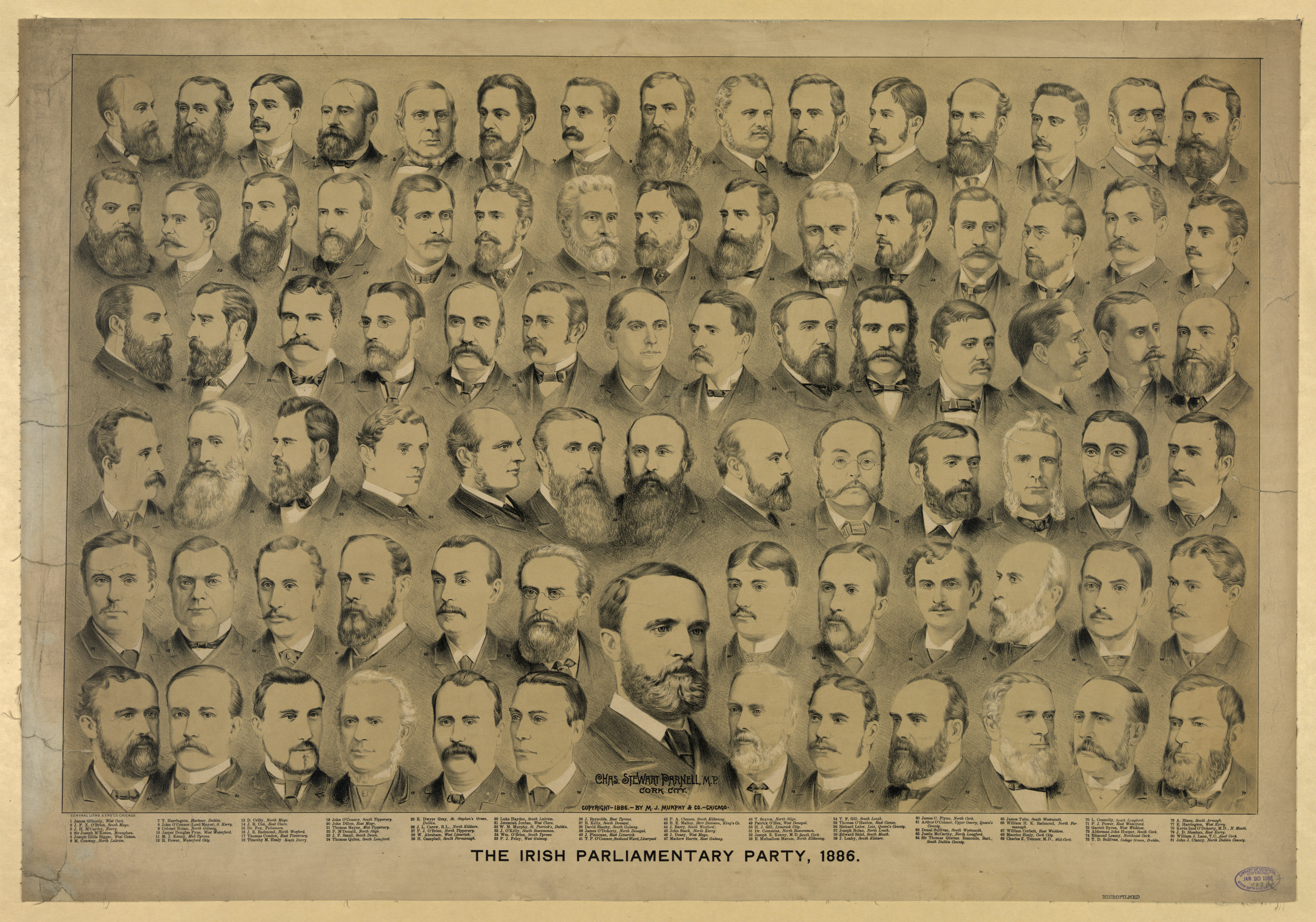
Irish Parliamentary Party, 1886

Early in 1886, Gladstone declared himself in favour of Home Rule. Parnell's party changed sides, allowing Gladstone to form his third government. Gladstone introduced the first Home Rule Bill 1886 and, after a long and fierce debate, made a remarkable Home Rule Speech, beseeching Parliament to pass the bill which was, however, defeated by 341 to 311 votes. The bill caused serious riots in Belfast during the summer and autumn of 1886, in which many were killed.

Since 1882, Parnell's successful drive for Home Rule created great anxiety amongst Protestants and Unionists north and south alike, fearing Catholic intolerance from a nationalist parliament in Dublin under their control would impose tariffs on industry. While most of Ireland was primarily agricultural, six of the counties in Ulster were the location of heavy industry and would be affected by any tariff barriers imposed. It resulted in the revival of the Orange Order to resist Home Rule and the forming of an Irish Unionist Party. With the Conservatives playing the "Ulster card", and sections of the Liberal faction voting against the bill, Gladstone hinted that eventually a separate solution for Ulster might need to be sought. His observation echoed far into the next century.

The Liberal Party split on the issue of Irish Home Rule. With the defeat of his Home Rule bill, Gladstone was granted a general election for July 1886, the result swinging in the other direction. The Conservatives were the largest party and were able to form a minority government with the loose support of the Liberal faction opposed to Home Rule, the Liberal Unionist Party.

The Irish Party retained 85 seats and, in the years up to 1889, centred itself around the formidable figure of Parnell, who continued to pursue Home Rule, striving to reassure English voters that it would be of no threat to them. During that period, the National League was out of contact with him and primarily concerned with its own vested interests, keeping up local agitation during the Plan of Campaign to further the not-fully-resolved land question, and leading Liberal voters to slowly increase their support for Home Rule.

=== Zenith eclipse ===
Parnell successfully exposed an attempt to use the forged Pigott Papers to associate him and his party with crime and violence; he was vindicated in February 1890. Gladstone invited Parnell to his country house (Hawarden in Flintshire) to discuss a renewed Home Rule bill. This was the high point of Parnell's career. However, since 1880 he had had a family relationship with a married woman Katharine O'Shea who bore him three children. Her divorce proceedings first came to court late in 1890, in which Parnell was named co-respondent. This was a political scandal for English Victorian society. Gladstone reacted by informing Parnell that if he were re-elected leader of the Irish Party, Home Rule would be withdrawn. Parnell did not disclose this to his party and was selected leader on 25 November.

A special meeting of the party a week later lasted six days at the end of which 45 "anti-Parnellites" walked out, leaving him with 27 faithful followers, J. J. Clancy one of his key defenders. Both sides returned to Ireland to organise their supporters into two parties, the former Parnellite Irish National League (INL) under John Redmond and John Dillon's anti-Parnellite Irish National Federation (INF). By-elections in 1891 were fought with bitter venom by the INF anti-Parnellites, Dillon and Healy making extremely personal attacks on Parnell. The INF was also supported by the Catholic clergy who went to aggressive extremes to ensure that INF candidates were returned.

Parnell worked untiringly between Ireland and Britain making speeches for support which he actually got from the (IRB) Fenians who rallied to him. He was married in June 1891 to Mrs O'Shea. After an election tour in the west of Ireland, his health deteriorated seriously, and he died in October in their Brighton home. His funeral in Dublin was attended by 200,000 people. In his speeches he was convinced of an Ireland completely separated from Britain, but was ambiguous, never committing himself nor distancing himself, from the use of physical-force.

=== Party divided ===
In the 1892 general election that followed, Redmond's Parnellites won a third of the Home Rule/nationalist votes (18.2% Parnellites v. 58.9% for anti-Parnellites) but only nine seats, the anti-Parnellites returned 72 MPs divided between Dillonites and a fragmented minority of six Healyites – the People's Rights Association. Gladstone and the Liberals were again in power, the divided Home Rulers holding the balance of power. Gladstone brought in his promised second Home Rule Bill in 1893. It was master-handled through three readings of the Commons by William O'Brien and passed in September by 301 votes to 267, during which Unionist conventions called in Dublin and Belfast to oppose the bill, denounced the possibility of partition. A week later 419 peers in the Lords rejected it, only 41 supporting. Gladstone retired in 1894.

The Conservatives and Liberal Unionists returned to power in the 1895 general election, now in coalition and remaining in office until 1905. During those years Home Rule was not on their agenda. Instead, with Arthur Balfour's Constructive Unionism approach to settling the Irish Question they enacted many important reforms introduced by the Irish members, who, on the other hand, made no effort to settle their party differences. This bred apathy amongst the Irish public towards politics, much needed financial contributions from America ebbing away. In this period of political disarray and disunity of purpose young Irish nationalists turned instead to the country's new cultural and militant movements, enabling the Church to fill the political vacuum.

The unresolved land reform situation was again the mainspring for renewed political activity. William O'Brien had withdrawn from parliament to Mayo and in 1898, driven by the plight of the farming community's need for more land, formed together with Davitt a new land movement, the United Irish League (UIL). It quickly spread first in the west, the following year nationwide like the old Land League and attracted members from all factions of the two split parties, O'Brien threatening to displace them and take them both over.

=== Reconstruction ===
The outbreak of the Second Boer War in 1899 was condemned by both Irish factions; their combined opposition helped to bring about a measure of understanding between them. By 1900 the threat of O'Brien swamping and outmanoeuvring them at the upcoming elections forced the two divided parties, the INL and the INF, to re-unite. He was the prime mover and may be truly regarded as an architect of the settlement of 1900 in merging them under a new programme of agrarian agitation, political reform and Home Rule into a new united Irish Parliamentary Party. Redmond, leader of the smaller INL group, was chosen as its leader mainly due to the personal rivalries between the INF's Anti-Parnellite leaders. After the party returned 77 MPs in the 1900 general election a period of considerable political development followed.

The UIL, explicitly designed to reconcile the fragmented party, was accepted as the parliamentary nationalists' main support organisation, with which O'Brien intensified his campaign of agrarian agitation. Encouraged by the Chief Secretary George Wyndham and initiated by moderate landlords led by Lord Dunraven the December 1902 Land Reform Conference followed, which successfully aimed at a settlement by conciliatory agreement between landlord and tenant. O'Brien, Redmond, T. W. Russell (who spoke for Ulster tenant-farmers) and Timothy Harrington represented the tenant side. Its outcome became the basis for O'Brien orchestrating the unprecedented Wyndham Land Purchase (Ireland) Act 1903 through Parliament, which enabled tenant farmers to buy out their landlord's land at favourable annuities, while giving the landlords a premium price. The last landlords sold out in the 1920s, thus ending the age-old Irish land question.

=== Renewed rift ===
The masterful strategy adopted by William O'Brien of bringing about agreement on land purchase between tenants and landlords under the act, may almost be said to have been too great a success as it resulted in a rush of landlords to sell and of tenants to buy. Dillon, the deputy party leader, disfavoured the Act because he opposed any negotiations with landlords, Michael Davitt objected to peasant proprietorship, demanding land nationalisation. Together with Thomas Sexton editor of the party's Freeman's Journal, they campaigned against O'Brien, ferociously attacking him for putting Land Purchase and Conciliation before Home Rule. O'Brien's appeal to Redmond to suppress their opposition went unheeded. After stating that he was making no headway with his policy, he resigned his parliamentary seat in November 1903. It was a serious setback for the party, at the same time turning once intimate friends into mortal enemies. O'Brien subsequently engaged during 1904–1905 with the Irish Reform Association and in 1907 with the Irish Council Bill which he viewed as a step in the right direction, or "Home Rule by instalments", equally condemned by his opponents.

O'Brien's UIL was taken over by Dillon's protégé and ally, Joseph Devlin, a young Belfast MP, as its new secretary. Devlin had founded a decade earlier the Catholic sectarian neo-Ribbon Ancient Order of Hibernians (AOH), organising its rise first in Ulster and after he had control of the UIL, eventually across the south, largely displacing the UIL. The Irish Party came to have an increasing dependence on the AOH, though the party's attempts to crush out Healyite and O'Brienite 'factionism' were carried out through its national organisation, the UIL. The 1906 general election saw the Liberals back in power with 379 seats, an overwhelming majority of 88 over all other parties, after they had promised Home Rule. Redmond's IPP now with 82 seats, at first delighted until the Liberals backed down on Home Rule, knowing it had no chance in the Lords.

The IPP rift with O'Brien deepened after he helped guide the Bryce Labourers (Ireland) Act 1906 through Parliament, which provided large-scale government funding for a programme of extensive rural social housing. In the following five years over 40,000 labourer owned cottages standing on an acre of land and purchases at low annual annuities, were erected by local county councils. The act, and the follow-on Birrell Labourers Act 1911, housed over a quarter of a million rural labourers and their families and thereby transformed the Irish countryside.

In 1907 Richard Hazleton became the new party secretary. Outside the party at this time were the MPs William O'Brien, Sir Thomas Esmonde, T. M. Healy, Charles Dolan, John O'Donnell, Augustine Roche and D. D. Sheehan. Proposals to reunite the party were made by Redmond and a meeting summoned for the Mansion House, Dublin in April 1908. O'Brien and others rejoined the party temporarily for the sake of unity. But on his demand for further treasury funding for land purchase, O'Brien was ultimately driven out for good at a Dublin Convention in February 1909 by the party's vigorous militant support organisation, Devlin's "Hibernians". After which O'Brien founded his own political party in March 1909, the All-for-Ireland League (AFIL).

=== Notable legislation ===
During the previous years many notable Acts of social legislation were pressed for and passed in Ireland's interest:

- The creation of the Congested Districts Board in 1891, which built public works for, and provided employment in, the poor districts of western Ireland.
- The extensive 1898 Local Government Act abolished the old landlord-dominated grand juries and replaced them by forty-nine county, urban and rural district councils, managed by Irish people for the administration of local affairs. The councils were very popular in Ireland as they established a political class, who showed themselves capable of running Irish affairs. It also stimulated the desire to attain Home Rule and to manage affairs on a national level. A less positive consequence was that the councils were largely dominated by the Irish Party, becoming the wielders of local patronage.
- Irish Department of Agriculture Act and Technical Instructors Act (1899) (initiative of Horace Plunkett)
- Tenant Land Purchase Acts (Land Purchase (Ireland) Act 1903 and Birrell Act 1909), contributing greatly to the solution of the contentious land question
- Labourers (Ireland) Acts (Bryce Act 1906 and Birrell Act 1911) (the Sheehan Acts), providing rural labourers with extensive housing
- Town Tenants Act (1906)
- Evicted Tenants Act (1907)
- Old Age Pensions Act (1908)
- Irish (Catholic) University Act (1908)
- Housing of the Working Classes (Ireland) Act (1908) (the Clancy Act)

=== Home Rule succeeds ===
In the January 1910 United Kingdom general election (January 1910 general election in Ireland), the Liberals lost their majority, and became dependent on the Irish (IPP and AFIL) Party's 84 seats. Redmond, holding the balance of power in the Commons, renewed the old "Liberal Alliance" this time with H. H. Asquith as Prime Minister (the Labour Party also supported the government). Asquith needed the support of Irish MPs to pass the People's Budget and, after a second general election in December 1910 had produced almost exactly the same result, he had no choice but to agree to a new Home Rule Bill. The Parliament Act 1911 abolished the veto of the House of Lords over most matters and limited them to a two-year delaying power, ensuring that Redmond's reward of a Government of Ireland Bill for the whole of Ireland introduced in 1912 would subsequently achieve national self-government in Dublin by 1914.

This prospect after 40 years of struggle was greeted optimistically, even when self-government was initially limited to running Irish affairs. But for Unionists, convinced the Union with the United Kingdom was economically best for Ireland, and for Protestants, now that Devlin's paramilitary AOH organisation had saturated the entire island, fearing a Church dominated nationalist government, it was a disaster.

After the Bill passed its first readings in 1913, Ulster Unionists' opposition became a repeat scenario of events in 1886 and 1893, their leader Sir Edward Carson approving of an Ulster Volunteer militia to oppose Home Rule. Unionists and the Orange Order in mass demonstrations determined to ensure that Home Rule would not apply for them. Nationalists in turn formed their own armed group, the Irish Volunteers to enforce Home Rule. The initiative for a series of meetings leading up to the public inauguration of the Volunteers came from the Irish Republican Brotherhood (IRB). The Volunteers had 180,000 members by May 1914. Redmond, worried by the growth of nationalist mass movement outside the Party, quickly tried to take control of the Volunteers. He demanded and was given a position on its leadership council and rapidly filled its ranks with IPP supporters.

Redmond and his IPP nationalists, as later those who succeeded them in 1919, had little or no knowledge of Belfast, underestimating Unionist resistance as a bluff, insisting "Ulster will have to follow". William O'Brien who in 1893 worked closely on passing the Second Home Rule Bill, warned to no avail, that if adequate provisions were not made for Ulster, All-Ireland self-government would never be achieved.

The Bill was the centre of intense parliamentary debate and controversy throughout 1913–1914 before it passed its final reading in May, denounced by the O'Brienite Party as a "partition deal" after Carson forced through an Amending Bill providing for the exclusion of Ulster, permanent or provisional to be negotiated, which ultimately led to the partition of Ireland. This was deeply resented among northern nationalists and southern unionists who felt themselves abandoned. The Government of Ireland Act 1914 received Royal Assent in September 1914, celebrated with bonfires across southern Ireland.

=== Europe intervenes ===
The outbreak of World War I in August led to the suspension of the Home Rule Act for the duration of the war, expected to only last a year. Ireland's involvement in the war defused the threat of civil war in Ireland and was to prove crucial to subsequent Irish history. After neutral Belgium had been overrun by Germany, Redmond and his party leaders, in order to ensure Home Rule would be implemented after the war, called on the Irish Volunteers to support Britain's war effort (her commitment under the Triple Entente and the Allied cause).

The Volunteers split on the issue of support for the British and Allied war effort. The majority (over 142,000) formed the National Volunteers, compared to roughly 10,000 who stayed with the original organisation. Though initially there was a surge in voluntary enlistment for the Irish regiments of the 10th (Irish) Division and the 16th (Irish) Division of Kitchener's New Service Army formed for the war, the enthusiasm did not last.

Unlike their 36th (Ulster) Division counterparts and the Ulster Volunteers who manned it with their own trained military reserve officers, the southern Volunteers possessed no officers with previous military experience with the result that the War Office had the 16th Division led by English officers, which with the exception of Irish General William Hickie, and the fact that the division did not have its own specific uniforms, was an unpopular decision. The War Office also reacted with suspicion to Redmond's remark that the Volunteers would soon return as an armed army to oppose Ulster's resistance to Home Rule.

Around 24,000 of the National Volunteers did enlist but the remainder, or about 80% did not. Moreover, the organisation declined due to lack of training and organisation as the war went on. "The resulting collapse of the National Volunteers presaged that of the Irish Party itself, though this was less obvious. Its support for the War was gradually revealed to be a major political encumbrance." The Under Secretary for Ireland, Mathew Nathan, writing in November 1915, thought that Redmond's stance on the War ultimately cost him and his party their pre-eminent position in Irish life, "Redmond has been honestly imperial, but by going as far as he has, he has lost his position in the country."

When the war situation worsened, a new Conservative-Liberal coalition government was formed in May 1915. Redmond was offered a seat in its cabinet, which he declined. This was welcomed in Ireland but greatly weakened his position after his rival, unionist leader Carson accepted a cabinet post. As the war prolonged, the IPP's image suffered from the horrific casualties at the Cape Helles landings at Gallipoli as well as on the Western Front.

The party was taken by surprise by the Easter Rising in April 1916, launched by the section of the Irish Volunteers who had remained in the original organisation. The Volunteers, infiltrated to a large degree by the separatist Irish Republican Brotherhood, declared an Irish Republic and took over much of the centre of Dublin. The rebellion in Dublin was put down in a week of fighting with about 500 deaths. The manner in which British General Maxwell dealt with its leaders won sympathy for their cause. A total of 16 were shot within weeks of the Rising and another hanged several weeks later. The Rising began the decline of constitutional nationalism as represented by the IPP and the ascent of a more radical separatist form of Irish nationalism. John Redmond, protesting at the severity of the state's response to the Rising, wrote to Asquith, "if any more executions take place, Ireland will become impossible for any Constitutional Party or leader".

Further problems for the party followed Asquith's abortive attempt to introduce Home Rule in July 1916 which failed on the threat of partition. Again Lloyd George's initiative to disentangle the Home Rule deadlock after Redmond called the Irish Convention in June 1917, when Southern Unionists sided with Nationalists on the issue of Home Rule, ended unresolved due to Ulster resistance.

=== Crisis and change ===
In sharp contrast to Parnell, John Redmond lacked charisma. He worked well in small committees, but had little success in arousing large audiences. Parnell always chose the nominees to Parliament. Now they were selected by the local party organisations, giving Redmond numerous weak MPs over whom he had little control. Redmond was an excellent representative of the old Ireland, but grew increasingly out-dated as he paid little attention to the new forces attracting younger Irishman, such as Sinn Féin, and the Ancient Order of Hibernians in politics, the Gaelic Athletic Association in sports, and the Gaelic League in cultural affairs. He never tried to understand the forces emerging in Ulster. Redmond was further weakened in 1914 by the formation by Sinn Féin members of the militaristic Irish Volunteers. His enthusiastic support for the British war effort alienated many Catholics. His party had been increasingly hollowed out, and the major crises—notably the Easter Rising in 1916 and the Conscription crisis of 1918—were enough to destroy it.

Redmond died in March 1918 and John Dillon took over the IPP leadership. In March the German spring offensive overran part of the British front. Lloyd George's cabinet took a dual policy decision by, clumsily linking implementing Home Rule with alleviating the severe manpower shortage by extending conscription to Ireland. The Irish party withdrew in protest from Westminster and returned to Ireland to join forces with other national organisations in massed anti-conscription demonstrations in Dublin. Although conscription was never enforced in Ireland, as fresh American troops began to be deployed to France in large numbers, the threat of conscription radicalised Irish politics. Sinn Féin, the political arm of the Volunteer insurgents, had public opinion believe that they alone had prevented conscription.

The Irish party held its own and returned its candidates in by-elections up to the end of 1916, the last in the West-Cork by-election of October 1916. The tide then changed after it lost three by-elections in 1917 to the more physical-force republican Sinn Féin movement, which in the meantime had built up 1,500 organised clubs around Ireland and exceeded the strength of the old UIL, most of the latter members now joining the new movement. At the end of the war in November 1918 when elections were announced for the December general election, the Irish electorate of nearly two million had a threefold increase under the Representation of the People Act 1918. Women were granted franchise for the first time (confined to those over thirty) and a vote to every male over twenty-one years of age. This increased the number of voters from 30% to 75% of all adults.

=== Decisive election ===
The Irish Parliamentary Party was for the first time confronted with double opponents from both Unionists and Sinn Féin (the Irish Labour Party founded in 1912 did not participate). In the past the IPP only faced opposition from candidates at conventions within the Home Rule movement. It never had to compete a nationwide election, so that the party branches and organisation had slowly declined. In most constituencies the new young local Sinn Féin organisation controlled the electoral scene well in advance of the election. As a result, in 25 constituencies the IPP did not contest the seats, and Sinn Féin candidates were returned unopposed.

The Party lost 78 of its 84 seats. This was due to the "first past the post" British electoral system. Votes cast for the IPP were 220,837 (21.7%) for merely 6 seats (down from 84 out of 105 seats in 1910). Sinn Féin votes were 476,087 (or 46.9%) for 48 seats, plus 25 uncontested totalling an 73 seats. Unionist (including Unionist Labour) votes were 305,206 (30.2%) – by which Unionists increased their representation from 19 to 26 seats. The Irish Party leader Dillon lost his seat and the party was dissolved. The remnants of the IPP later re-established itself with six members to form the Nationalist Party in Northern Ireland under Joe Devlin.

Twenty-seven of the newly elected Sinn Féin MPs assembled in Dublin on 21 January 1919 and formed an Irish parliament, or Dáil Éireann of a self-declared Irish Republic. Their remaining MPs were either still imprisoned or impaired. The UK state did not recognise the Dáil's unilateral existence, which led to the War of Independence. The government remained committed to introducing Home Rule in Ireland, and in 1921 implemented the Fourth Home Rule Act, which partitioned Ireland into Northern Ireland and a non-functioning Southern Ireland before the Anglo-Irish Treaty.

== After dissolution ==
The results, while a triumph for the republicans, showed that the IPP's politics still had a significant constituency across the island. In the North East, and especially in Belfast, the IPP had more or less held their ground against the Sinn Féin insurgency, (Éamon de Valera soundly beaten by Joe Devlin in the Falls division). The IPP regrouped to become the Nationalist Party of Northern Ireland.

In the South after the Irish Civil War, the political estate of the Irish Party inherited by Sinn Féin evolved into the two nationalist parties of the post-1922 state. On the pro-Treaty side, some Cumann na nGaedheal / Fine Gael leaders (apart from James Dillon) had 'Redmondite' backgrounds, the most notable being John A. Costello, a later Taoiseach. The core of this party group was however solidly Sinn Féin, IRB and IRA in background. On the anti-Treaty Sinn Féin side that developed into Fianna Fáil, there was no continuity with the Irish Party at elite level. Many former AOH/IPP followers also lingered on as a pro-Treaty support organisation, some AOH adherents later fought on the Francoist side in the Spanish Civil War, the quasi-fascist Blueshirt movement of the 1930s maybe owing much to its Ribbon tradition. Veteran MP Timothy Michael Healy was the first Governor-General of the Irish Free State (1922–1928), chosen to bridge the gap between the old order and the new generation of Cumann na nGaedheal politicians, though he was highly partisan (his nephew was Minister for Justice Kevin O'Higgins; Healy made a public attack on Fianna Fáil and Éamon de Valera, which led to republican calls for his resignation). Former party MP Hugh Law was elected as a Cumann na nGaedheal TD during the 1920s.

The conservative nationalist National League Party operated between 1926 and 1931, founded by former IPP MPs Captain William Redmond (son of Irish National League and IPP leader John Redmond) and Thomas O'Donnell. It quickly faltered, with many of its prominent members (including Redmond, Vincent Rice, John Jinks and James Coburn) joining Cumann na nGaedheal / Fine Gael, although O'Donnell became an active member of Fianna Fáil. A short-lived National Centre Party was formed in 1932, absorbing the remnants of the conservative Farmers' Party and led by Frank MacDermot and James Dillon (son of IPP leader John Dillon). The success of Fianna Fáil prompted the National Centre Party to amalgamate with Cumann na nGaedheal to become Fine Gael in 1933. Both MacDermot and Dillon later left Fine Gael, and both argued for Irish entry into World War II on th side of the Allies. MacDermot later joined Fianna Fáil while Dillon returned to Fine Gael and served as party leader from 1959 to 1965.

== Party leaders (1874–1921) ==
Leader	Portrait	Period
Isaac Butt		1874–1879
William Shaw		1879–1880
Charles Stewart Parnell		1880–1891
John Redmond		1900–1918
John Dillon		1918–1918
Joe Devlin		1918–1921

== General election results ==
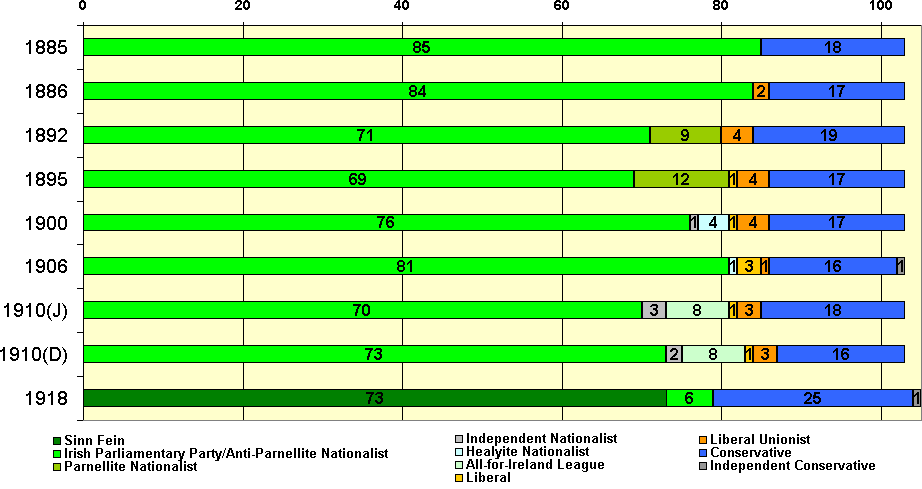
Graph of Irish UK MPs 1885–1918 in numbers

Election	House of Commons	Share of votes (Note: Because of the large number of uncontested seats at elections in this period, raw vote share may not give a clear picture of overall support.)	Irish seats	Government
1885	23rd	67.8%	85 / 103	
1886	24th	48.6%	84 / 103	
1892	25th	18.2%	71 / 103	
1895	26th	%	69 / 103	
1900	27th	%	76 / 103	
1906	28th	21.5%	81 / 103	
1910 (Jan)	29th	35.1%	70 / 103	
1910 (Dec)	30th	43.6%	73 / 103	
1918	31st	21.7%	6 / 105	

== See also ==
- Independent Irish Party (1850s)
- History of Ireland (1801–1923)
