= Bea Orpen =

Irish painter (1913–1980)

- Born: Beatrice Esther Orpen; 7 March 1913; Lisheens, Carrickmines, County Dublin, Ireland
- Died: 12 July 1980 (aged 67); Cottage Hospital, Drogheda
- Education: Dublin Metropolitan School of Art
- Known for: painting and graphic design
- Style: abstract
- Spouse: Chalmers Edward FitzJohn ('Terry') Trench
- Awards: RHA First Prize for Life Drawing (1933), RHA First Prize for Painting from life (1934), First Prize in decorative composition (1936)
- Elected: Honorary member to Royal Hibernian Academy

Bea Orpen HRHA (7 March 1913 – 12 July 1980) was an Irish landscape and portrait painter and teacher. She aided in the establishment of the Drogheda Municipal Gallery of Art.

== Early life and education ==
Beatrice Esther Orpen was born at Lisheens, Carrickmines, County Dublin, on 7 March 1913. She was one of a pair of twin girls and was the youngest of five daughters and one son of Charles St George Orpen and Cerise Maria Orpen (née Darley). Her father was a solicitor and served as the president of the Incorporated Law Society from 1915 to 1916. Her sister Kathleen Delap was an activist and feminist. Orpen was the niece of the architect and painter Richard Caulfield Orpen and the painter Sir William Orpen. She was educated privately at home by a governess until age 13, when she attended the French School, Bray, and then Alexandra College, Dublin. Orpen took private lessons on the fundamentals of colour and line under Lilian Davidson, going on to enrol in the Dublin Metropolitan School of Art and the Royal Hibernian Academy (RHA) from 1932 to 1935. Whilst studying, she was a pupil of Seán O'Sullivan, and won first prize for drawing from life in 1933, and painting from life in 1934. Orpen moved to London to continue studying at the Slade School of Fine Art from 1935 to 1939. She excelled at decorative design, going on to win first prize in decorative composition in 1936, earning her diploma in design in 1939. Orpen attended the School of Typography, Fleet Street, and was trained in textile and commercial design at the London County Council Central School of Arts and Crafts. On 5 July 1940, Orpen married Chalmers Edward FitzJohn ('Terry') Trench, who was the founding secretary and former president of An Óige. They went on to have three sons and one daughter, Fiachra, Brian, Beatrice and Patrick.

== Artistic career ==
Orpen made her début at the RHA while still a student in 1939, and she exhibited with them every year until 1980, exhibiting over 100 paintings in total. She also exhibited with the Water Colour Society of Ireland almost every year from 1936 to 1980. Whilst still studying in London, she received a number of commercial commissions to design posters, brochures, book jackets, and greeting cards. Orpen returned to Ireland in 1939 and mounted her first solo show that October in the Country Shop, St Stephen's Green which was managed by Muriel Gahan. She is best known as a landscape artist, favouring gouache and a sombre palette on tinted paper. She perfected a rapid method early in her career, which was a requirement for this quick-drying medium. She often worked in watercolour, and apart from a period in the 1960s, rarely worked in oil paint. Orpen would often go on painting holidays in Ireland, painting scenes in counties Louth, Meath, Dublin, Wicklow, including those on the west coast. She travelled to Norway and Brittany early in her career, and later went to continental Europe in the 1960s and 1970s to paint. She mounted a number of solo shows over the course of her career, at the Grafton Galleries in 1947 and 1954, the Neptune Gallery in 1977, and in Drogheda in 1978. Orpen was a regular contributor at the Oireachtas, the Irish Exhibition of Living Art from 1943 to 1958, and the Exhibition of Modern Irish Art, Wexford from 1945 to 1980, as well as several local exhibitions and festivals. Orpen and her husband established the Drogheda Municipal Art Collection, serving on its committee which collected over 60 works by 1980, and the collection is now part of the permanent collections of the Highlanes Gallery.

Orpen also taught art in a number of schools in Drogheda, the technical school from 1973 to 1974, the Drogheda Grammar school from 1946 to 1959, and St Peter's national school from 1949 to 1974. She gave talks on art appreciation to school children and adults all over Ireland as an Arts Council of Ireland lecturer under the Charlotte Shaw Trust from 1957 to 1978. She was a member of An Taisce, and served as the government appointee to the governing body of the National Institute for Higher Education, Dublin from 1975 to 1978, and the Stamp Design Advisory Committee from 1977 to 1980.

She was member of the Irish Countrywomen's Association (ICA) from 1939, acting as chairman of the executive committee in 1952. As a member of the ICA she was involved in the arts and crafts elements of the organisation, teaching classes at An Grianán, the ICA's college at Termonfeckin from 1954. She established and directed an annual arts course for primary school teachers at the college from 1959 to 1977. She served as the president of the ICA from 1974 to 1976, and focussed on environmental protection, urging the adoption of recycling, and the creation of local history groups with the aim of fostering pride in local areas. She led the Irish delegation at the 14th triennial conference of the Associated Country Women of the World (ACWW) in Perth, Australia in 1974, and was a speaker at the 15th conference in Nairobi, Kenya in 1977. As part of journey to Australia in 1974, Orpen stopped off in Tahiti, and painted in east Africa in 1977. Orpen was a co-founder of Drogheda town associates in 1947, and served as president of Louth/Meath federation in 1950.

== Later life and legacy ==
Orpen suffered a brain haemorrhage in May 1978, which left her permanently invalided and hospitalised. She was elected an honorary member of the RHA in May 1980. Orpen died on 12 July 1980, at the Cottage Hospital, Drogheda. Her body was donated to science through the Trinity College, Dublin medical school. Two retrospectives have been held of her work, in 1981 at the Gorry gallery, Dublin, and in 1995 at the Droichead Arts Centre, Drogheda. A building on the Dublin City University campus is named in her honour.
