= Kathleen Delap =

Irish activist and feminist

- Born: Kathleen Hilda Orpen; 27 January 1910; Carrickmines, County Dublin, Ireland
- Died: 29 October 2004 (aged 94); Dublin, Ireland

Kathleen Delap (27 January 1910 – 29 October 2004) was an Irish activist and feminist.

== Early life ==
Born Kathleen Hilda Orpen on 27 January 1910 to Charles St George Orpen (1864–1939) and Cerise Maria Darley (d.1950) at home in Lisheens, Carrickmines, County Dublin. Delap was the fourth child and third daughter among five daughters and one son, Arthur. Her parents were well-connected and prosperous Protestant families. The Darley's had owned a brewery in Stillorgan, County Dublin, and were related to the Guinness family. Charles Orpen was the solicitor for Trinity College, Dublin and the Representative Church Body of the Church of Ireland. Two of her uncles were the artist Sir William Orpen and the architect and painter Richard Caulfeild Orpen. Of her sisters, Bea Orpen was an accomplished artist, Grace Somerville-Large published on traditional dancing in Donegal and Cerise Parker ran the Avoca School with her husband. Delap was educated at home by governesses until she was 15. At that point she went to school in Alexandra College, and from there to University College Dublin to study architecture. Before she finished college Delap married Hugh Alexander Delap on 27 July 1933 in Tullow parish church. With him she had two sons and two daughters. Her husband died on 27 January 1997. Delap died in St Vincent's Hospital, Dublin, after a short illness in 2004.

== Activism ==
Depal joined the 'town associates' of the Irish Countrywomen's Association in 1937 which began a long career with them. Delap edited a page of ICA news in the Farmers' Gazette from 1947 to 1955. In 1955 she became the association's honorary secretary, and chairman of the executive committee in 1958. With Muriel Gahan she worked to develop An Grianán, the ICA's college in County Louth, and was one of the trustees of the ICA's property.

One of her arguments to the Irish government was that farmers' wives needed technical training, something which was being offered to farmers at the time. She also campaigned for running water to be supplied to all rural homes as well as rural electrification. She fought for a number of equality related issues such as reforms in income tax and social services provision and equal pay for women. She had a public profile and as a result helped shape attitudes of the government and public to the needs of Irish women. Delap was a founder of the National Women's Council of Ireland

In 1973 Delap was part of a conference on women and social service which was based in the Wellington Park Hotel in Belfast. The hotel was destroyed by a bomb blast. This led to a greater involvement by Delap with the 1971 Women's Voluntary Emergency Service and the Glencree Centre for Peace and Reconciliation, in County Wicklow. During the Emergency in Ireland Delap had volunteered with the St John Ambulance.

Delap said husbands and wives should share housework, that women should be able to have the choice to work outside the home, that women should be able to choose not to have children, or not to marry. This was in a conference paper in 1975. The views were not held by everyone at the time but she became more and more regarded as a holder of the ICA values. In 1983 she was given their highest honour Buan Cháirde (special friend), and was described by the organisation as a national treasure.

Delap also worked with her husband on issues such as helping Traveller families and the unemployed.
