= Ellice Pilkington =

Irish women's activist and artist

- Born: Louisa Ellice Esmonde; 1 September 1869 (possibly at Ballynastragh, Gorey, County Wexford)
- Died: 24 August 1936 (aged 66); Ballsbridge, Dublin
- Resting place: Tyrrellspass, County Westmeath
- Spouse: Colonel Henry Lionel Pilkington CB
- Father: Sir John Esmonde Bt

Ellice Pilkington (1 September 1869 – 24 August 1936) was an Irish women's activist and artist.

== Early life ==
Ellice Pilkington was born Louisa Ellice Benedicta Grattan Esmonde on 1 September 1869. She was the second daughter of John Esmonde and Louisa Esmonde (née Grattan). Her father was an MP and lieutenant-colonel of Waterford artillery militia, of Ballynastragh, Gorey, County Wexford, and her mother was the granddaughter of Henry Grattan. She had four brothers, Thomas, Laurence, Walter, John, and one sister, Annette. Educated in Paris, she also studied art in Rome. She married Capt. Henry Lionel Pilkington, of the 21st Hussars, from Tore, Tyrrellspass, County Westmeath, on 23 June 1896. The Pilkingtons lived in South Africa when her husband commanded the West Australian Mounted Infantry in the Second Boer War. While there she taught in refugee camps. They had two daughters, Ellice Moira and Annette. They lived for a time at Llys-y-Gwinit, Holyhead, Wales.

== Activism ==
Pilkington was a friend of Horace Plunkett and George W. Russell. It was a speech by Russell at an annual general meeting of the Irish Agricultural Organization Society that inspired the foundation of the Society of the United Irishwomen (UI) by Anita Lett in 1910. Pilkington was the first volunteer organiser of the UI and was a leading figure during its early years. She toured extensively in 1910, founding and organising new branches in the south and west of Ireland. County Wexford was deemed the most successful during this time. Pilkington arrived in County Donegal in December 1910, armed with a map and a thermos flask, whilst there she described emigration as a blight on rural Ireland. From this point on, female emigration became one of the major concerns of the UI.

The 1911 pamphlet, The United Irishwomen: their work, place and ideals, was composed of three essays by Plunkett, Pilkington, and Russell, and a preface by Fr Thomas Finlay. Pilkington focused on the role of the UI in teaching and promoting rural housewives to establish home industries, maintain a cleanly home, to provide a healthy diet for the family, and to take an active role in public and intellectual life. The pamphlet could have been a response to criticism, in particular as many objected to women's involvement in public affairs. Pilkington strongly believed in the need for women to work for the betterment of Ireland through their place in the home.

== Artistic work ==
Pilkington was actively interested in the arts in Ireland. In 1910, she wrote an article in the New Ireland Review, expressing regret that Irish artists and critics didn't find their own Irish expression through an Irish school, rather than imitating European schools. She held up George Russell as an example of an individual artist who also invoked an Irish national narrative. Pilkington did not articulate clearly her own vision of Irish national identity but believed it to be an important issue. As an artist, she painted scenes of Ireland and was exhibited by the Dublin Sketching Club in 1914 and 1915. She was shown regularly by the Water Colour Society of Ireland between 1921 and 1936, serving as the group's secretary for a time.

== Later life ==
Pilkington was widowed in 1914. Later in life, she was an active member of the Central Catholic Library Association, acting as its president of the ladies' committee for a number of years. She died at 38 Wellington Road, Ballsbridge, Dublin, on 24 August 1936. She is interred in the Pilkington family vault, Tyrrellspass, County Westmeath.
