= Horace Plunkett =

Irish agricultural reformer and politician (1854–1932)

The Right Honourable Sir Horace Plunkett KCVO JP DL FRS
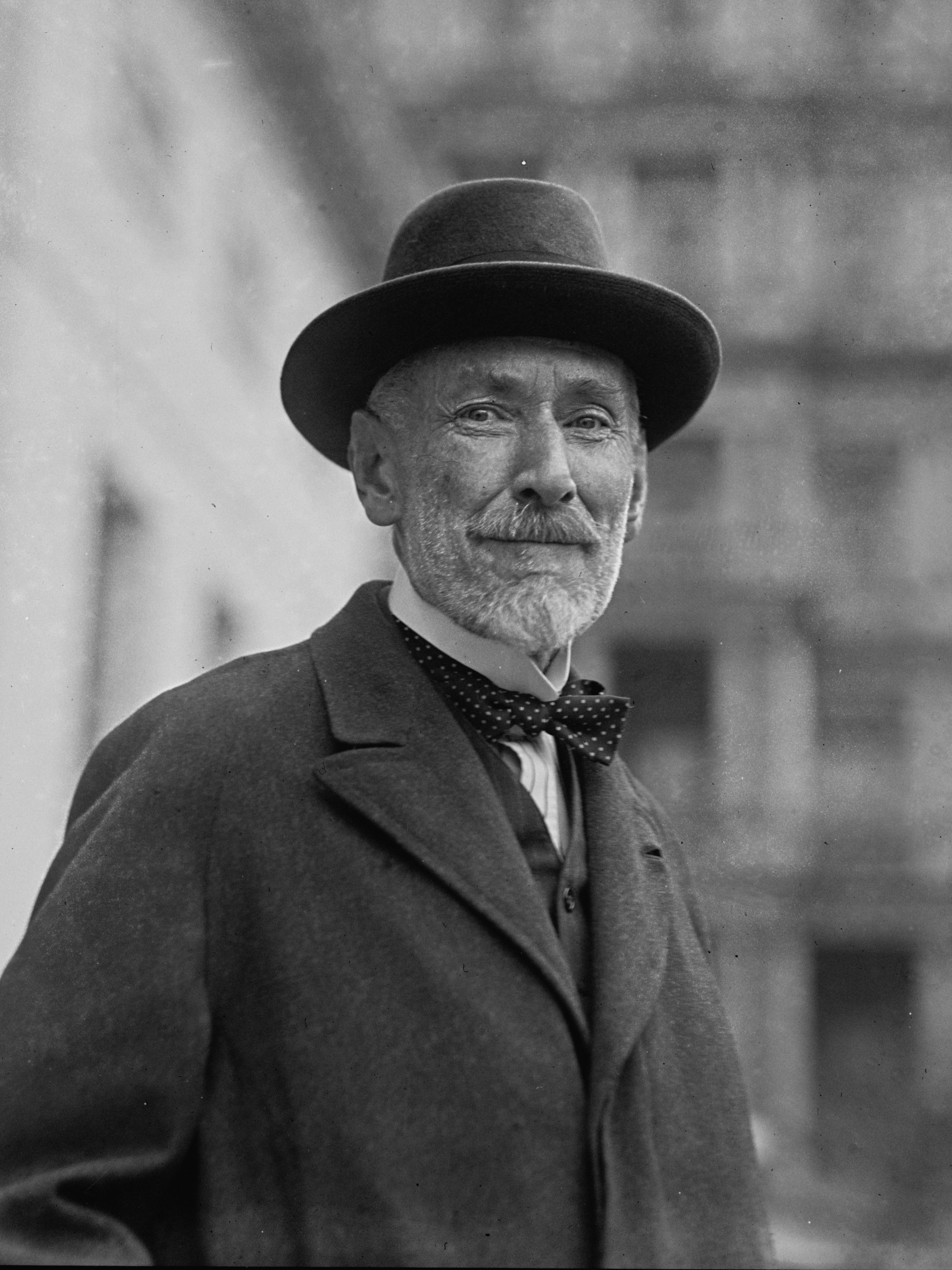

Seanad Éireann
- In office 11 December 1922 – 14 November 1923

Leader of the Irish Dominion League
- In office 1919–1921

Chairman of the Irish Convention
- In office 1917–1918

MP for South Dublin
- In office 1892–1900
- Preceded by: Sir Thomas Esmonde
- Succeeded by: John Mooney

Congested Districts Board for Ireland
- In office 1891–1918

Personal details
- Born: 24 October 1854 Sherborne, Gloucestershire, England
- Died: 26 March 1932 (aged 77) Weybridge, Surrey, England
- Party: Irish Conservative Party; Irish Unionist Alliance; Irish Dominion League; Independent
- Education: University College, Oxford

Sir Horace Curzon Plunkett KCVO PC (Ire) JP DL FRS (24 October 1854 – 26 March 1932), was an Anglo-Irish agricultural reformer, pioneer of agricultural cooperatives and author. In politics, he had been elected as a Unionist MP, but later became a supporter of a form of Home Rule and served for a year as a senator in the Irish Free State.

Plunkett, a younger brother of John Plunkett, 17th Baron of Dunsany, was a member of the Congested Districts Board for Ireland for over 27 years, founder of the Recess Committee and the Irish Agricultural Organisation Society (IAOS), vice-president (operational head) of the Department of Agriculture and Technical Instruction (DATI) for Ireland (predecessor to the Department of Agriculture) from October 1899 to May 1907, Unionist MP for South Dublin in the House of Commons of the United Kingdom from 1892 to 1900, and Chairman of the Irish Convention of 1917–18. In 1919 he founded the Irish Dominion League, aiming to keep Ireland united. In 1922 he became a member of the first formation of Seanad Éireann, the upper chamber in the Parliament of the new Irish Free State. He has been described as a Christian socialist.

== Family and background ==
Plunkett was born in Sherborne, Gloucestershire, England, the third son of Admiral Edward Plunkett, the 16th Baron of Dunsany, of Dunsany Castle, Dunsany, near Dunshaughlin, County Meath, and the Honourable Anne Constance Dutton (d. 1858; daughter of John Dutton, 2nd Baron Sherborne). Raised in County Meath, Plunkett was Anglo-Irish, being of a Church of Ireland and unionist background, educated at Eton College and University College, Oxford, of which he became an honorary fellow in 1909.

His older brother was John Plunkett, 17th Baron of Dunsany and a distant cousin was George Noble Plunkett, a Catholic, a Papal Count and father of Joseph Plunkett, one of the signatories of the Proclamation of the Irish Republic and a leader of the Easter Rising of 1916.

Threatened by lung trouble in 1879, Horace Plunkett sought health in ranching for ten years (1879–1889) in the Bighorn Mountains of Wyoming, where he acquired, together with a substantial fortune, extensive agricultural and business experience that proved invaluable in the work of agricultural education, improvement and development. On visits back to Ireland, and for much of the time when he returned, he devoted himself to these topics.

He devoted his career to agricultural and rural development, as well as to politics, diplomacy, public administration, and economics. He played a central role in the development of the Irish cooperative movement, which later included large creamery and food ingredient enterprises such as Avonmore and Kerry Group. He was also the prime driver in the establishment of the first government department for agriculture in Ireland, and founded the Plunkett Foundation. His work also influenced the formation of organisations including the Irish Countrywomen's Association and the Women's Institutes in the United Kingdom.

== Career ==
=== Early political career ===
Although a Unionist, Plunkett resolved to bring together people of all political views for the promotion of the material prosperity of the Irish people. In 1891 he was appointed to the newly established Congested Districts Board and learned at first-hand about the wretched conditions of the rural population, especially west of the River Shannon. The experience hardened his conviction that the one remedy for social and economic ills was cooperative self-help. The Congested Districts Board were a major plank of the ultimately failed Conservative policy of Constructive Unionism or "killing Home Rule with kindness".

Around him, he saw a troubled economy, racked with dissension, denuded by emigration, impoverished in its countryside and economically stagnant in its towns.

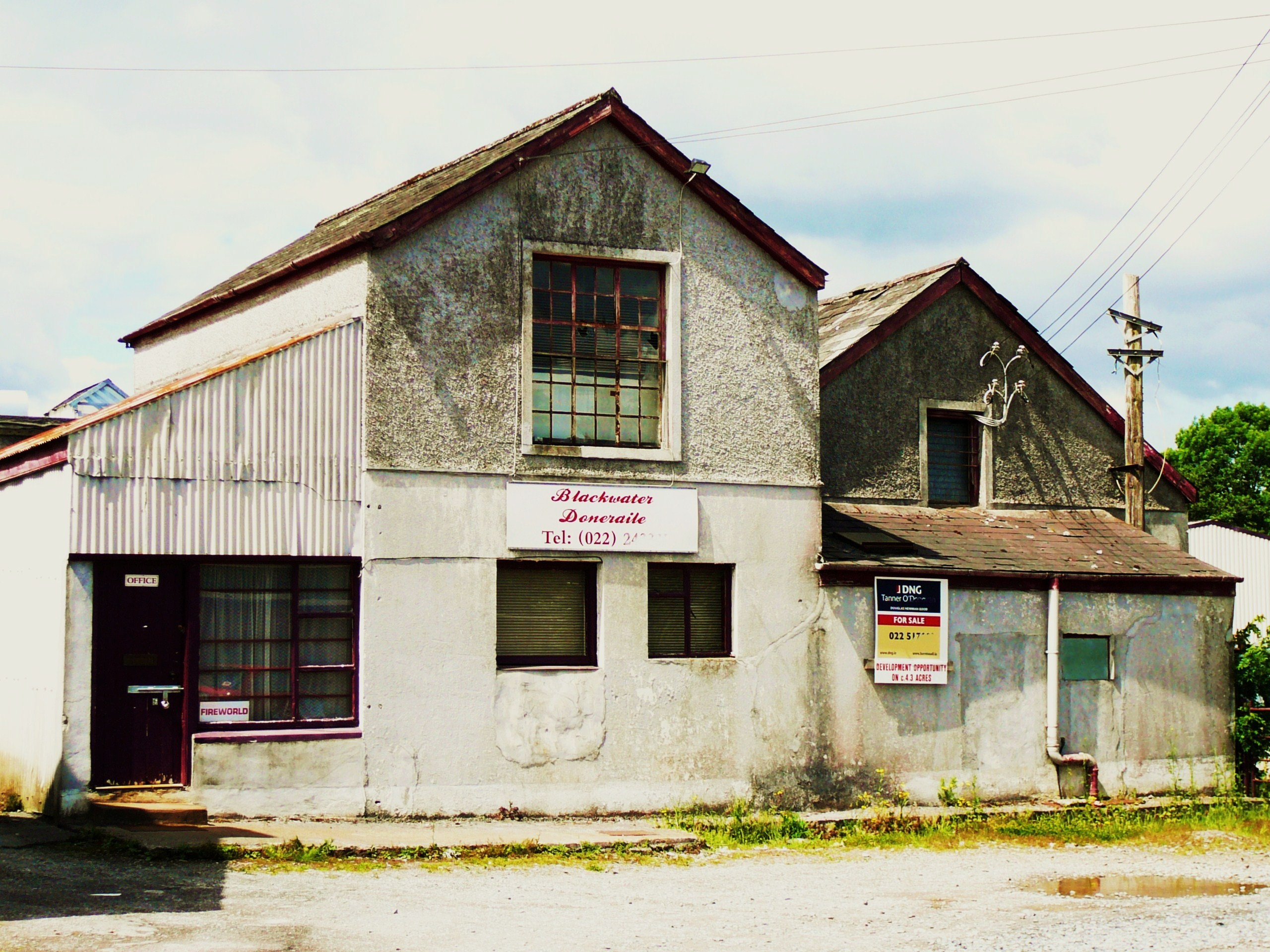
First Irish Dairy Cooperative, erected and established 1889, in Doneraile, County Cork.

Before going to America he had become an enthusiast for the Rochdale principles of Consumer cooperatives and in 1878 had set a store up on the family estate.

=== Agricultural reform ===
Plunkett took a leading part in developing agricultural co-operation in Ireland, of which he had learned from isolated American farmers, taking account of Scandinavian models of cooperation and the invention of the steam-powered cream separator. Working with a few colleagues, including two members of the clergy, and advocating self-reliance, he set his ideas into practice first among dairy farmers in the south of Ireland, who established Ireland's first cooperative at Doneraile, County Cork. He also opened the first creamery in Dromcollogher, County Limerick, now the site of the National Dairy Cooperative Museum.

In the setting up of creameries, the cooperative movement experienced its greatest success. Plunkett got farmers to join to establish units to process and market their own butter, milk and cheese to standards suitable for the profitable British market, rather than producing unhygienic, poor-quality output in their homes for local traders. This enabled farmers to deal directly with companies established by themselves, which guaranteed fair prices without middlemen absorbing the profits.

=== Work with Roosevelt ===
Plunkett believed that the Industrial Revolution needed to be redressed by an agricultural revolution through cooperation, and proclaimed his ideals under the slogan "Better farming, better business, better living". (US president Theodore Roosevelt adopted the slogan for his conservation and country life policy.)

Gifford Pinchot, Theodore Roosevelt's head of the Bureau of Forestry introduced Plunkett to Roosevelt in 1906. Roosevelt had recently set up the National Conservation Commission and was also interested in Irish cooperatives. Arguing that it was not enough to conserve natural resources without tackling the problems of rural life, Plunkett and Pinchot helped draft Roosevelt's letter recommending the Commission on Country Life's report to congress. The Dictionary of Irish Biography credits Plunket with persuading Roosevelt to establish the commission as a complement to the conservation work.

=== Success and opposition ===
Public opinion, initially lukewarm, grew hostile in some sectors as the cooperative movement developed, and shopkeepers, butter-buyers and sections of the press led a campaign of virulent opposition. Cooperatives and Plunkett were denounced for supposedly ruining the dairy industry but the movement caught hold, with the mass of farmers benefitting. Plunkett and his colleagues including the poet and painter George William Russell ("Æ") made a good working team, writing widely on economic and cultural development, and on the role of labour.

As early as 1894, when his campaign reached a size too big to be directed by a few individuals, Plunkett founded the Irish Agricultural Organisation Society (IAOS), with Lord Monteagle, Thomas A. Finlay and others. Robert A. Anderson acted as secretary, with Æ and PJ Hannon his assistants. IAOS soon became the powerhouse of cooperation, with 33 affiliated dairy cooperative societies and cooperative banks, introducing cooperation among Irish farmers by proving the benefits obtainable through more economical and efficient management. The following year he and Russell began publishing its journal The Irish Homestead to spread information on farming. Four years later there were 243 affiliated societies. Within a decade, 800 societies were in existence, with a trade turnover of three million pounds sterling (over 300 million sterling in today's money, and the turnover of the resulting companies is in excess of a billion euro).

Plunkett's task was frustrating. He was a pioneer of the concept of systematic rural development, who, in spite of his role in Irish affairs being often overlooked, influenced many international reformers, and can be credited as one of the few who had a long-term vision for the development of rural Ireland. He was apt to remind audiences that, even if full peasant proprietorship was achieved and Home Rule was implemented, rural underdevelopment would still have to be faced. But class conflict between farmers and shopkeepers intervened to frustrate much of what he aimed to do.

=== MP for South Dublin ===
Before entering Parliament, Plunkett had been involved in the Unionist reaction to the Liberal leader William Ewart Gladstone's conversion to Home Rule, predicting in a speech to an 1886 Unionist demonstration that Home rule would lead to "squalid poverty and violent social disorder, which before long is almost certain to end in civil war".

At the 1892 general election he was elected as the Irish Unionist Alliance Member of Parliament (MP) for South Dublin, gaining it from the Anti-Parnellite incumbent Sir Thomas Esmonde against a split nationalist vote. He successfully held the seat against a sole nationalist (Parnellite Nationalist) challenger Edmund Haviland-Burke in 1895.

Early in his career, Plunkett opposed home rule because of the danger of partition. In 1893 he asserted that one of the leading objections to any measure of home rule was that if it were possible to enforce it on Ulster "... it would intensify and perpetuate a state of things in which the Boyne seemed to be broader, deeper and stormier than the Irish Sea".

At the 1900, F. Elrington Ball stood as an independent Unionist candidate against Plunkett's conciliatory approach. This split the unionist vote, and Plunkett was defeated by John Mooney of the Irish Parliamentary Party.

=== Expanding cooperation ===
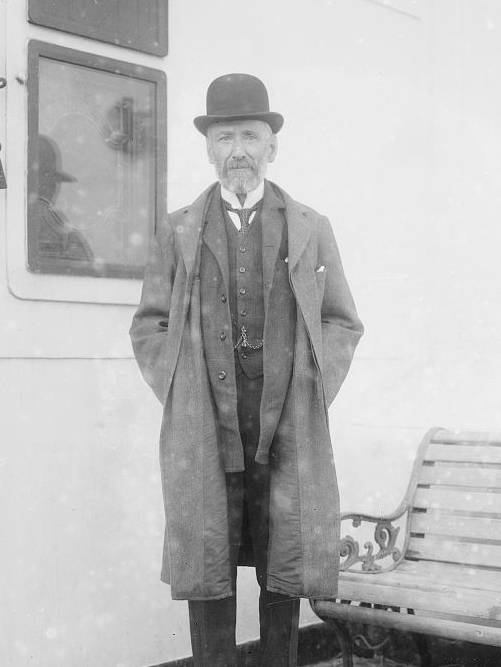
Plunkett in 1915

Continuing his policy of conciliation, Plunkett suggested in a letter to the Irish press in August 1895 that a few prominent persons of various political opinions, both nationalist and unionist, should meet to discuss and frame a scheme of practical legislation for pursuing national development, and to make recommendations on the Agriculture and Industries (Ireland) Bill of 1897.

The outcome of this proposal was the formation of the Recess Committee, with Plunkett as chairman and members of divergent views, such as the Earl of Mayo, John Redmond, The O'Conor Don, Thomas Sinclair, Thomas Spring Rice, Rev Dr Kane (Grand Master of the Belfast Orangemen), Father Thomas A. Finlay, Mr John Ross, MP, Timothy Harrington MP, Sir John Arnott, Sir William Ewart, Sir Daniel Dixon (after Lord Mayor of Belfast), Sir James Musgrave (Chairman of the Belfast Harbour Board), Thomas Andrews (Chairman of the Belfast and County Down Railway). T. P. Gill acted as Honorary Secretary to the committee.

In July 1896, the Recess Committee issued a report, of which Plunkett was the author, containing accounts of the systems of state aid to agriculture and technical instruction in foreign countries. This report, and the growing influence of Plunkett, who became a member of the Irish Privy Council in 1897, led to the passing in 1899 of an Act establishing the Department of Agriculture and Technical Instruction (DATI) for Ireland, of which the Chief Secretary for Ireland was to be President ex officio. Plunkett was appointed vice-president, a position of de facto leadership. He guided the policy and administration of the DATI in its first seven critical years.

The DATI worked:

- to improve the quality of crops and livestock
- to deal with animal and plant disease
- to encourage fishing and planting of forests
- to collect statistics on many aspects of Irish life.

By 1914 the DATI had 138 instructors travelling the country, informing farmers about new methods in agriculture, horticulture and poultry-keeping. The start of the 20th century saw the high water mark in Plunket's achievements. The IAOS was flourishing and vigorous. In 1903 there were 370 dairy societies, 201 cooperative banks and 146 agricultural societies under the auspices of the IAOS, and by 1914 there were over 1,000 societies and nearly 90,000 members. However, most unionists considered Plunkett too conciliatory and their hostility cost him his seat at the 1900 general election, when they put up a candidate to split the unionist vote.

It had been intended that the vice-president should be responsible for the DATI in the House of Commons, but an extensively signed memo, supported by the Agricultural Council, prayed that Plunkett might not be removed from office, and at the government's request he continued to direct the policy of the DATI without a seat in Parliament. He was created Knight Commander of the Royal Victorian Order in 1903 at Queenstown, on the personal initiative of the King.

On the accession of the Liberal Party to power in 1906 James Bryce, the new Chief Secretary, asked Plunkett to remain at the head of the department he had created.

=== Efforts obstructed ===
Having sat in the House of Commons as a Unionist, attitudes among the nationalist party were exacerbated by the opinions in his book, Ireland in the New Century (1904). Here he described the economic condition and needs of the country, and the nature of the agricultural improvement schemes he had promoted. Plunkett put forth the view that economics was more important than politics for the future of Ireland, classed the huge sums invested in the building of Catholic churches as "uneconomic" and remarked negatively on the power of the Catholic hierarchy.

John Redmond, leader of the Irish Parliamentary Party, turned against Plunkett for suggesting that anything but Home Rule might be the answer to Ireland's problems, and other mainstream nationalists, led by John Dillon, rejected economic development, whether through Plunkett's agricultural cooperatives, William O'Brien's tenant land purchase or D. D. Sheehan's housing of rural labourers, in advance of "national development".

Ultimately the DATI ceased to work harmoniously with the IAOS, wrecking Plunkett's hopes, and the Irish Parliamentary Party made a determined effort to drive him from office, moving a resolution to that effect in the House of Commons in 1907. The government gave way, and although Plunkett was re-elected president of the IAOS in the summer of 1907, he retired from office in the DATI. From the year 1900 the DATI had made an annual grant of about £4,000 to the IAOS, but in 1907 the new vice-president of the DATI, T.W. Russell, who had previously been a member of the Unionist administration, withdrew it. Nonetheless, many continued to be inspired by Plunkett's vision and to establish creamery cooperatives around the country.

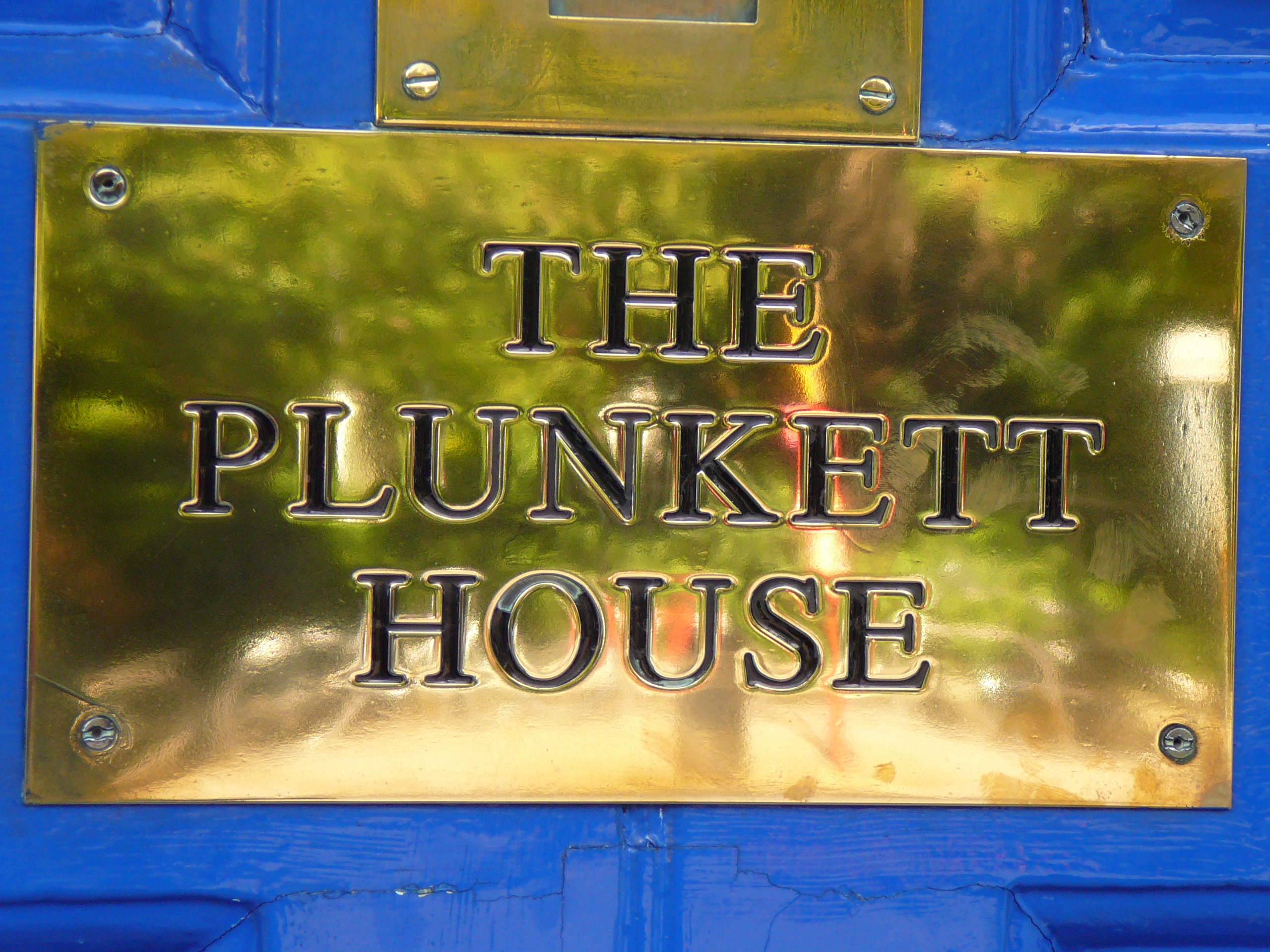
The Plunkett House nameplate

In 1908 public appreciation of Plunkett's service was marked by the purchase and gift to him of 84 Merrion Square, Dublin, which became the headquarters of the IAOS under the name The Plunkett House.

The Irish Homestead had frequently drawn attention to the status of women in rural Ireland (its assistant editor was Susan L. Mitchell), and in 1910 Plunkett helped to found the United Irishwomen to improve their domestic economy, welfare and education, with Ellice Pilkington and Anita Lett. This would develop in the 1930s into the powerful Irish Countrywomen's Association. It also inspired the foundation of the Women's Institutes in the UK.

=== Political reorientation ===
Having previously focused his attention pragmatically on economic factors, Plunkett now began to reorient to political and social issues. The failure of the Irish Council Bill in 1907 made him realise the critical importance of self-government and by 1912 he was a convinced Home Ruler. He spent the first half of 1914 in negotiations intended to prevent partition and the exclusion of Ulster, to no avail.

Hitherto he had been regarded as a moderate Unionist, but this suggestion rendered him suspect in Ulster eyes, and the suspicion was confirmed when he published in the third week of July a pamphlet entitled The Better Way: an Appeal to Ulster not to Desert Ireland, in which he announced his conversion to Home Rule and appealed to Ulster to give Home Rule a chance, re-stating the arguments of his previous letter, and suggesting a conference of Irishmen on the bill. This was his attempt to avert civil war; but the situation was revolutionized by the outbreak of the First World War.

During the war the cooperatives were severely hit as farmers avoided their high standards, supplying inferior produce directly to Britain, where food shortages led to a boom period for Irish agriculture.

Much of Plunkett's time was spent as an unofficial envoy between Britain and the United States. After the Easter Rising of 1916, when he heard of executions, he sought clemency for its remaining leaders, including Constance Markievicz, except for anyone involved in regular crime.

Once again, in 1917, he took the lead in an attempt to solve the Irish question. When Lloyd George set up a convention of Irishmen to consider the suspended Third Home Rule Act 1914, and report their conclusions, there was great difficulty in finding a suitable chairman; but the first meeting unanimously chose Sir Horace for the post. He was himself sanguine, and worked at his task with singular devotion until May 1918; but the absence of Sinn Féin from the gathering, and the impossibility of reconciling the views of the Ulstermen and the southern Unionists, prevented the adoption of any report with unanimity. He may have lost what would have been a historic deal in January 1918 by diverting the debate to the issue of land purchase.

Until 1922 Plunkett worked to keep Ireland united within the British Commonwealth, founding the Irish Dominion League and a weekly journal, the Irish Statesman, to advance that aim, for which he was rejected by those working for an Irish Republic. Plunkett had proposed that if Home Rule for all of Ireland was implemented that Ulster should have the right to vote itself out after 10 years.

He met Michael Collins, whom he described as "simple yet cunning".

=== Marginalisation and departure from Ireland ===
In 1922, after the Anglo-Irish Treaty was implemented, Plunkett was nominated to the first Seanad Éireann, the upper chamber of the parliament of the new Irish state. He took his seat on 18 December 1922. In recognition of his contributions and ideas, he was one of those appointed for a term of 12 years.

His work on cooperation took him abroad frequently, and when he was in the United States during the Irish Civil War in 1923, his home, Kilteragh, in Foxrock, County Dublin, was one of some 300 country houses targeted by the IRA and burned down, the fire taking with it many of the records of the Plunkett family, which he had gathered to prepare a work on the subject. Plunkett wrote of his sorrow that "the healthiest house in the world, and the meeting place of a splendid body of Irishmen and friends of Ireland" had been destroyed. He resigned from the Seanad in November 1923.

=== Later years and the Plunkett Foundation ===
Plunkett moved to Weybridge, England. On 21 December 1918 he set up the Sir Horace Plunkett Foundation, which moved fully to England in 1924, and is now the charitable Plunkett Foundation. The foundation launched in 1919 with £5,000 to support its work, including education, with the co-operative movement and other community organisations. As of 2022, the foundation continues its work.

Plunkett continued to promote and spread his ideas for agricultural cooperatives. In 1924 he presided over a conference on agricultural cooperation in the British Commonwealth in London, and in 1925 he visited South Africa to help the movement there. As late in 1930, he was consulting with the Prime Minister of Great Britain on agricultural policy.

== Personal life ==
Plunkett was close to his nephews, Edward and Reginald Dunsany, helping manage their, and their father's, affairs. He also worked to reconcile the 17th Lord Dunsany and his wife over several years. He was very involved in the affairs of the 18th Lord Dunsany (Edward) until some failures of investments in the 1920s, after which their contact was more occasional but continued to near the end. His dealings with Reginald were more limited in earlier years but he continued to visit him at Charborough and elsewhere, right up to the month of his death.

He was also close friends with Elizabeth "Daisy" Burke Plunkett, Lady Fingall, the wife of his remote cousin. He became interested in aviation late in life and was still flying – presumably from Brooklands – at least as late as 1930.

=== Last years ===
During Plunkett's last years, Gerald Heard was his personal secretary. Naomi Mitchison, who admired Plunkett and was a friend of Heard, wrote: "H.P., as we all called him, was getting past his prime and often ill but struggling to go on with the work to which he was devoted. Gerald [Heard] who was shepherding him about fairly continually, apologized once for leaving a dinner party abruptly when H.P. was suddenly overwhelmed by exhaustion".

Plunkett died at Weybridge on 26 March 1932 and was buried in St Mary's Churchyard in nearby Byfleet, where his gravestone survives.

== Writings ==
- Ireland in the New Century (1904), Sir Horace Plunkett, new edition with additional material, 1905
- Noblesse Oblige: An Irish Rendering (1908), Sir Horace Plunkett
- The Rural Life Problem of the United States, (1910), Sir Horace Plunkett

== Related bibliography ==
- Lady Fingal (1991) [1937]. Seventy Years Young, Memoires of Elizabeth, Countess of Fingall. Dublin 7, Ireland: The Lilliput Press. ISBN 0-946640-74-2.

Parliament of the United Kingdom
Preceded by Sir Thomas Esmonde, Bt	Member of Parliament for South Dublin; 1892 – 1900	Succeeded by John Mooney
