= Lucy Franks =

Irish Politician (1878 - 1964)

- Born: 27 February 1878; Westfield, County Laois
- Died: 12 July 1964 (aged 86)

Lucy Franks (27 February 1878 – 12 July 1964) was a president of the Irish Countrywomen's Association. She is credited with aiding in saving the United Irishwomen in the 1920s and giving it a pragmatic direction.

== Early life ==
Gertrude Lucy Franks was born in Westfield, County Laois, on 27 February 1878. She was the daughter of landowner Matthew Henry Franks and Gertrude Franks (née Despard). Her aunt by marriage was Charlotte Despard. Franks attended Alexandra College, Dublin, and having left school she returned home to care for her invalid father. In 1912 she joined the United Irishwomen, and five years later she helped found a local UI branch in Castletown. In 1923, the family home at Westfield was burnt down during the Irish Civil War, and the family moved to Blackhill House, Abbeyleix. Her father died in 1924, and Franks left Ireland for a period to travel in England and South Africa, returning to Ireland in 1926.

== United Irishwomen ==
Upon her return she found that the years of political upheaval had effected the UI, with just 8 branches left and less than a hundred members. She focused all her energies on revitalising the organisation, with her main objective to make it as useful as possible to women, giving them practical skills to improve their lives. Having learnt basket making in England, she set up basket and tray making classes, and encouraging members to sell their products. She was a member of the Royal Dublin Society by 1927 and organised a stand at the spring show to sell member's work. At the annual spring show the UI's stand was called "Countryside workers exhibit", showing products made by weavers, mat makers, basket makers, spinners, and work from Montessori school children. In 1929, Muriel Gahan became involved in the show, and worked with Franks at the offices of the UI in 33 Molesworth Street, Dublin. Gahan came up with the idea of establishing a permanent shop in Dublin to sell more of the produce of their members. The result was the Country Shop, at 23 St Stephen's Green and ran from 1930 to 1978. It was managed by the company Country Workers Ltd, with Franks sitting as director until her death in 1964. A restaurant was added to the shop at Franks' suggestion, with Gahan acknowledging later that this was the most successful part of the business.

Franks was a founding member of the Associated Country Women of the World (ACWW) in 1927. In 1936 at the triennial ACWW conference in Washington, Franks spoke about the functions and goals of the newly renamed UI, which has become the Irish Countrywomen's Association (ICA) in 1935. She was the national president of the ICA from 1942 to 1952. Under her guidance the ICA craft workers founded a guild, monitored by judges and tests. She also initiated a garden scheme, which turned crossroad plots into roadside gardens, and oversaw fund-raising country fairs. During her presidency plans were set out for a permanent residential college in which the summer schools could be held. In 1953 the college, An Grianán in Termonfeckin, County Louth was opening with funding from the Kellogg Foundation.

== Later life ==
In 1952, Franks was named a buan chara (honorary life member) as she retired from her presidency. She died on 12 July 1964, and is buried at Deans Grange Cemetery. Ireland hosted the triennial ACWW conference in 1965, during which a garden house at An Grianán ICA college was dedicated to her memory.
