= Torch Theatre =

Torch Theatre may refer to:

- Torch Theatre, Dublin, Ireland
- Torch Theatre, Milford Haven, Wales
