= Máirín Beaumont =

Irish nationalist and teacher

- Born: Mary McGavock; 7 December 1894; Glenarm, County Antrim, Ireland
- Died: 19 January 1972 (aged 77); St Vincent's hospital, Dublin
- Education: University College Dublin (BA, MA, HDipE)
- Occupation: Teacher
- Organization: Irish Countrywomen's Association
- Military career
- Branch: Cumann na mBan
- Conflicts: Irish War of Independence

Máirín or Maureen Beaumont (7 December 1894 – 19 January 1972) was an Irish nationalist and teacher.

== Early life and family ==
Máirín or Maureen Beaumont was born Mary McGavock in Glenarm, County Antrim, on 7 December 1894. Her parents were Annie (née MacNeill) and William McGavock, a merchant. Her maternal uncle was Eoin MacNeill. She had three sisters, one of whom, Roisín, married Joseph Connolly. Beaumont attended Dominican College, Eccles Street, Dublin. She graduated from University College Dublin (UCD) in 1915 with a first-class BA in languages. In 1916, she was awarded an MA in German, and then a higher diploma in education in 1917. During that time, she was influenced by the teachings of professor of education at UCD, Fr Timothy Corcoran.

She married Seán Beaumont in 1923. He was a journalist and academic who founded An tEireannach and later worked as an editor for The Irish Times. The couple had one son and two daughters. The family lived in Merrion, Dublin. Their daughter Máire married Dónall Ó Móráin.

== Nationalism ==
While studying at UCD and living at Dominican Hall, Dublin, Beaumont became active in the Irish nationalist movement. At the request of J. J. "Ginger" O'Connell, she stored arms and ammunition at the Dominican Hall in 1915. She also took classes in first aid before the Easter Rising in 1916, however she was in Antrim during the Rising and did not take part. Beaumont used her first aid training later, when helping Dr Kathleen Lynn treat those affected by the 1918 flu epidemic in Dublin. Later she was involved with the Cumann na mBan and supporting prisoners. She canvassed for Desmond FitzGerald during the 1918 general election, and in November 1920 he sheltered in her flat as a safe house. She joined the executive of Cumann na mBan in 1920 and worked as their organiser in the County Louth and Armagh area from 1920 to 1921.

== Career ==
Beaumont was among the founding staff of Louise Gavan Duffy's Scoil Bhríde in 1917 and continued to work there after her marriage. She also worked as an external examiner in education in the National University of Ireland. After Irish independence, Beaumont worked with a number of women's and social activism groups. She was a member of the Dublin Playgrounds Committee from the early 1930s, a group who ran play and childcare facilities. She served as president for the National University Women Graduates Association from 1951 to 1952, as well as serving as president of the UCD branch.

In the 1950s and 1960s, she was a member and sat on the executive of the Irish Countrywomen's Association (ICA), lecturing on Association courses on Irish literature. She was the vice-chair for the ICA's sub-committee on "residential courses" which was founded in January 1953, and in this capacity, she took part in talks with the Kellogg Foundation to secure funding for the project. During the committee meeting at Termonfeckin, County Louth, Beaumont chaired the session which chose the ultimate location of the college, An Grianán with the building being purchased with funds from the Kellogg Foundation.

Beaumont died in St Vincent's hospital in Dublin on 19 January 1972. Her body was donated to the College of Surgeons.
