= Lilian Davidson =

Irish landscape and portrait artist, teacher and writer

- Born: 26 January 1879; Castle Terrace, Bray, County Wicklow, Ireland
- Died: 29 March 1954 (aged 75); 4 Wilton Terrace, Dublin, Ireland
- Education: Dublin Metropolitan School of Art

Lilian Davidson ARHA (26 January 1879 – 29 March 1954) was an Irish landscape and portrait artist, teacher and writer.

== Early life and education ==
Lilian Lucy Davidson was born at Castle Terrace, Bray, County Wicklow, on 26 January 1879. She was the sixth of ten children of clerk of petty session, Edward Ellice Davidson, and Lucy Rising Davidson (née Doe). Her mother died in 1888, and it is presumed that Davidson received a private education but as the family were not affluent, the details are unclear. She went on to attend the Dublin Metropolitan School of Art (DMSA) from 1895 to 1905. Whilst at the DMSA, Davidson won prizes in 1895 and 1896, and was awarded a scholarship and free studentship at the Royal Dublin Society in 1897, the year her father died. She completed her studies in 1905. In the early 1910s, Davidson was living in Rathmines, and spent some time in England and Wales.

== Artistic career ==
Davidson was commissioned by Switzer's department store on Grafton Street to draw costumes in 1899. In 1909, her painting After rain was exhibited by the Dublin Sketching Club, with Davison continuing to show work there until 1920. She exhibited The bonfire with the Water Colour Society of Ireland in 1912, continuing to exhibit with them until 1954, and became a committee member in 1934. In 1914, she was one of the artists included in a sale of paintings to aid Belgian refugees. She was first exhibited at the Royal Hibernian Academy (RHA) in 1914, with The student. Her painting exhibited by the RHA in 1916, The harbour, St Ives, demonstrates an influence from Stanhope Forbes and the Newlyn school, with a bright palette and contrasting illumination, which became characteristic of her work. Davidson illustrated C. H. Bretherton's collection of humorous poems and recollections about London Zoo, A zoovenir (1919).

Davidson held a joint exhibition with Mainie Jellett in 1920, at Mill's Hall, Merrion Row, Dublin. Jellett produced a pencil portrait of Davison, which shows her in a straw hat she frequently wore. The RHA exhibited Davidson's oil painting, The flax pullers, in 1921. This work shows an influence from Paul Henry and French Impressionism in Davidson's use of colour-blocking. In the early 1920s, Davidson travelled to Switzerland, Belgium, and France, producing works such as Fish market, Bruges. She lived in Paris in the late 1920s, exhibiting at the Salon de la Societé Nationale in 1924 and 1930. Davidson placed a self-portrait in her depiction of a peasant gathering, The country races. Reproductions of her drawing of Leinster House and Christ Church Cathedral by Bulmer Hobson were included in A book of Dublin (1929). Her landscape, Low tide, Wicklow, which was exhibited at the RHA in 1934, and Boats at Wicklow, dusk show her ability to depict reflections in water. She continued to paint scenes of rural life, including Cottages – Keel, Achill, which shows an influence from Jack Butler Yeats in her use of space and colour. The fact that Davidson's family was not wealthy may have influenced her choice of poorer people as her subjects, depicting them in a sympathetic manner. Her work was part of the painting event in the art competition at the 1928 Summer Olympics.

Davidson's paintings were exhibited at the Contemporary Picture Galleries, Dublin in 1930, alongside Yeats, Evie Hone, and Harry Kernoff. She was a member of the Picture Hire Club, 24 Molesworth Street, Dublin from 1941 to 1942, and was a frequent contributor to the Munster Fine Arts Club. Her work was exhibited at the Salon des Beaux Arts, Paris, the Royal Academy of Arts, London, and in Amsterdam. A large number of her works from the 1930s show the Irish-speaking area of Galway, Claddagh, such as Night in Claddagh, exhibited with the RHA in 1933. Her Irish landscapes, such as Claddagh cottages, were included in the Oireachtas Art Exhibitions from 1932 to 1946. From around 1934, she was a member of the Society of Dublin Painters, exhibiting with them from 1939 to 1954. She influenced the Society's move towards the avant-garde in the 1940s. She was elected associate to the RHA in 1940, and continued to exhibit there until her death. Her 1946 work, Gorta, shows influence from Zola, Rilke, Dostoyevsky and Picasso.

Davidson taught drawing at her studio at 1 Earlsfort Terrace, Dublin. Her pupils included Bea Orpen, Anne Yeats, and Mo Irwin. She also was a teacher at a number of Dublin schools, such as Belgrave school, Rathmines, Wesley College, St Stephen's Green, and Castle Park School, Dalkey. She travelled to Abbeyleix, County Laois, once a week to teach at Glenbawn boarding school.

== Writing ==
As well as painting, Davidson wrote a number of plays, short stories, and monologues under a pseudonym, "Ulick Burke". In 1927, a collection of her poems and Donegal rhymes was published. In 1931, Hilton Edwards directed her stage play Bride, at the Gate Theatre. Her short story, Her only son, was published in The Bell under a pseudonym in 1942. In 1935, Davidson was a founder-member of the Torch Theatre, Dublin. She designed scenery, and was the co-director with Hugh Hyland in 1936, under the stage name "Jennifer Maude".

== Later life and legacy ==
Davidson died at her home at 4 Wilton Terrace, Dublin on 29 March 1954. She is buried in an unmarked grave in Mount Jerome Cemetery. The National Gallery of Ireland (NGI) holds her 1938 portrait of Yeats, as well as her crayon drawing of Sarah Purser. She was a regular attendee at Purser's "Second Tuesdays" gatherings. The Abbey Theatre holds her portrait of Joseph Holloway. Davidson bequeathed The golden shawl to the Hugh Lane Gallery, which is a large self-portrait. Two of her works were included in the NGI's 1987 exhibition, Irish Women Artists From the Eighteenth Century to the Present Day.
