= Irish Countrywomen's Association =

Women's organisation in Ireland

- Bantracht na Tuaithe
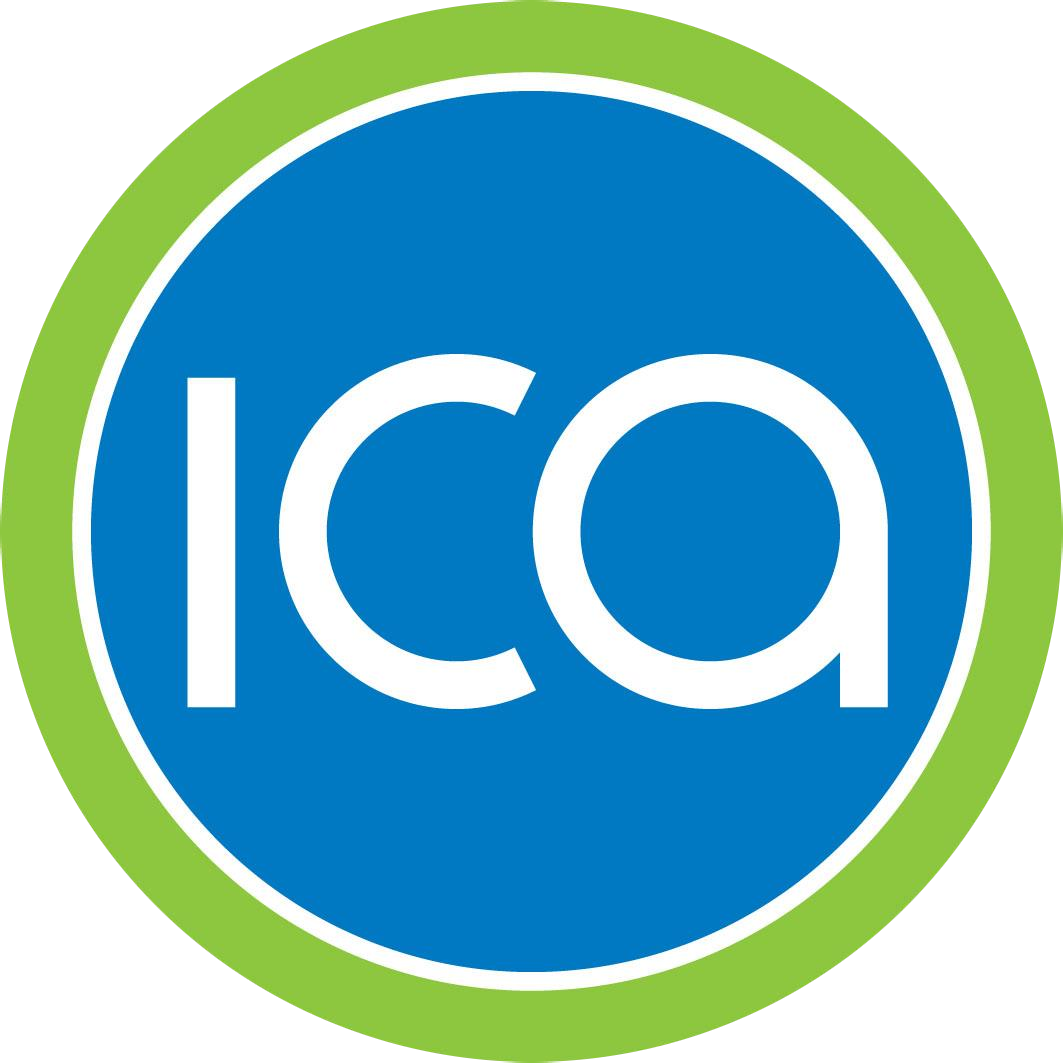
- Abbreviation: ICA
- Formation: 1910; 116 years ago
- Headquarters: 58 Merrion Road; Dublin 4 D04 W448
- Location: Dublin, Ireland
- Members: 6,100 (2023)
- Website: www.ica.ie
- Formerly called: Society of United Irishwomen (until 1935)

The Irish Countrywomen's Association (ICA; Irish: Bantracht na Tuaithe) is the largest women's organisation in Ireland, with 6,100 members. Founded in 1910 as the Society of United Irishwomen, it exists to provide social and educational opportunities for women and to improve the standard of rural and urban life in Ireland. Its central office is in Dublin. It is one of the oldest societies of its kind in the world.

== History ==
Inspired by the work of Horace Plunkett, a first branch of the Society of United Irishwomen was founded in 1910 by Anita Lett in County Wexford, followed by a second towards the end of that year. The wider association was established by a committee meeting at The Plunkett House, the headquarters of the Irish Agricultural Organisation Society, and including Ellice Pilkington, great-granddaughter of Henry Grattan, with the support of Horace Plunkett. In 1935, the society changed its name to the Irish Countrywomen's Association to avoid any association with the nationalist United Ireland Party (now known as Fine Gael).

Working against the rampant antifeminism of 20th-century Ireland, the association worked on teaching and promoting rural housewives to establish home industries, maintain a hygienic home, provide a healthy diet for their families, and take an active role in public and intellectual life. From its earliest days, the association was enthusiastic for the development of an Irish artistic and crafts identity.

During the 20th century, the ICA was involved in the promotion of good health, education, and access to basic utilities throughout Ireland. It worked closely with the ESB Group during its roll-out of rural electrification in the 1950s and 1960s.

== Activities ==
The association runs courses in crafts and skills at its centre An Grianán in Termonfeckin, County Louth. The centre was purchased using funds secured by an ICA sub-committee on "residential courses", which was founded in 1953 and chaired by Máirín Beaumont. This centre was founded by Muriel Gahan and Kathleen Delap. The centre has a garden house named in honour of the ICA president, Lucy Franks, who oversaw the plans for the centre in the years before it opened.

As of 2007, the organisation was campaigning on behalf of women who receive wrong cancer diagnoses. In December 2007, it organised a meeting in Dublin of 1,100 women, one of a series of such meetings around Ireland.

== Politics ==
Former presidents, Kit Ahern, Peggy Farrell, and Camilla Hannon were nominated by the Taoiseach to serve in Seanad Éireann, the upper house of the Oireachtas (the Irish parliament). Another former president, Patsy Lawlor, was elected to the Cultural and Educational Panel in 1981.

== Leadership ==
Notable former presidents included Elizabeth Burke-Plunkett, Lucy Franks, Bea Orpen, Kit Ahern, Peggy Farrell, and Patsy Lawlor.
