= Irish Central Committee for the Employment of Women =

WW I era advisory organisation

- Abbreviation: CCEW
- Formation: November 1914
- Dissolved: 30 June 1919

The Irish Central Committee for the Employment of Women was an organisation set up in Ireland during the First World War as a central advisory scheme for local organisations. It operated from November 1914 until June 1919. The organisation was similar to the Central Committee on Women's Employment set up in mainland Britain.

== History ==
The Irish Central Committee for the Employment of Women (CCEW) was set up by the British Government in November 1914, in partnership with the Queen's Work for Women Fund. It covered the regions of Leinster, Munster, and Connaught, and there was a separate committee for the Ulster region of Ireland. Prominent suffragist Mary Galway was a member of the Ulster branch. The CCEW consisted mainly of Dublin women's suffrage campaigners, with its aim being as a central advisory committee to the localised branches. At its formation, the chairman of the committee was Elizabeth Burke-Plunkett, Countess of Fingal. James Mallon was CCEW secretary, and Isabel Talbot, Baroness Talbot de Malahide and Lady Caroline Arnott were also committee members. Anti-war suffragette Cissie Cahalan was involved in the CCEW. The CCEW aimed to pay Irish women the same as British women in mainland Britain.

Many professional nurses volunteered themselves for the war effort, whilst non-professionals helped with sewing and making bandages. Over the course of the war, 1,400 women worked in state-owned munitions factories in Dublin, Waterford, Cork and Galway. A toy-making factory was set up in Dawson Street, Dublin, to replace toys that had previously been made in Germany. In late 1915, the CCEW made an appeal in Dublin to manufacture 300,000 pairs of socks and 300,000 belts for the Army.

After the First World War, the committee was disbanded by the British Government on 30 June 1919.

== Criticism ==
There was some criticism of the CCEW, as some munitions factories favoured volunteer labour over paid labour, which prevented women from getting paid employment. One such complaint was escalated to Matthew Nathan, Under-Secretary for Ireland in 1916. There were also cases where factories replaced women by girls under 18, as the minimum wage for under 18s was only 5s per week. Women in CCEW also sometimes received low wages, and so these workplaces were sometimes referred to as "Queen Mary's Sweatshops".
