= Elizabeth Burke-Plunkett =

Activist and literary hostess

The Rt Hon. The Countess of Fingall
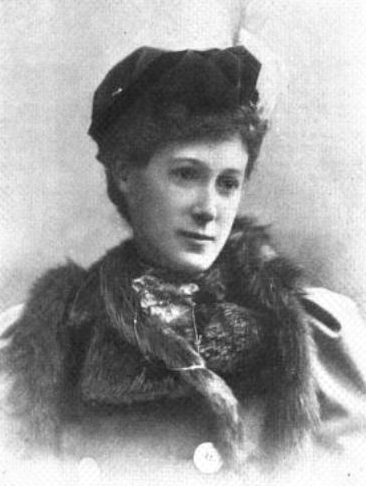
- In The Sketch, 11 April 1900

2nd President of the Camogie Association
- In office 1911–1923
- Succeeded by: Máire Gill

Personal details
- Born: 13 September 1862 Moycullen, County Galway
- Died: 28 October 1944 (aged 82) Dublin, Ireland
- Spouse: Arthur Plunkett (1859–1929)
- Children: Oliver Plunkett, 12th Earl of Fingall; Mary Elizabeth Kirk; Henrietta Plunkett; Gerald Plunkett
- Profession: printer

Elizabeth Mary Margaret Plunkett, Countess of Fingall (née Burke; 13 September 1862 – 28 October 1944) was born in Moycullen, a daughter of George Edmond Burke of Danesfield and his wife Theresa Quin. She became an activist in Irish industrial, charitable and cultural groups, serving as second president of the Camogie Association and first president of the Irish Countrywomen's Association. She was also a noted literary hostess, whose salon at Earlsfort House was a centre of Dublin intellectual life for many years.

== Countess ==
In 1883, she married Arthur James Francis Plunkett, 11th Earl of Fingall, 4th Baron Fingall (1859–1929), state steward to the administration in Dublin Castle and one of the few Catholics to hold an Irish peerage, thus becoming Countess of Fingall.

Lady Fingall befriended unionists such as Field Marshal The 1st Earl Haig and Chief Secretary George Wyndham and also nationalist leaders such as Charles Stewart Parnell, Michael Collins and Éamon de Valera, as well as activists like the cooperative pioneer Sir Horace Plunkett. Her colourful memoir of those circles was published in 1937. She established a famous literary salon; for many years she was "at home" every Thursday at Earlsfort House to the leading figures in Dublin intellectual circles. Her main rival as a literary hostess was the artist Sarah Purser, who was "at home" every Tuesday.

== Activism and philanthropy ==
A friendship with Máire Ní Chinnéide, forged through theatrical circles, led to her accepting the patronage of Camogie Association of Ireland from 1910 to 1923. She also presented a cup and medals for the winners of the Dublin League. She served largely in an honorary role attending a few meetings of what was then known as Cualacht Luithchleas na mBan Gaedheal.

A liberal unionist, she became active in the promotion of Irish agriculture, industry and culture. She was a founder member of Horace Plunkett’s Irish co-operative movement, was the first president of the United Irishwomen in 1912–21 and of its successor, the Irish Countrywomen's Association until 1942. She presided at suffragette meetings in Dublin, was a founder of the Irish Distressed Ladies Committee, and served on the board of the Irish Industries Association. She was also the chairperson of the Irish Central Committee for the Employment of Women.

She died at Earlsfort House, her Dublin home, where she had held her famous Thursdays "at home" for many years, on 28 October 1944 and was buried in Killeen Castle, County Meath.
