= Central Committee on Women's Employment =

WWI era advisory organisation

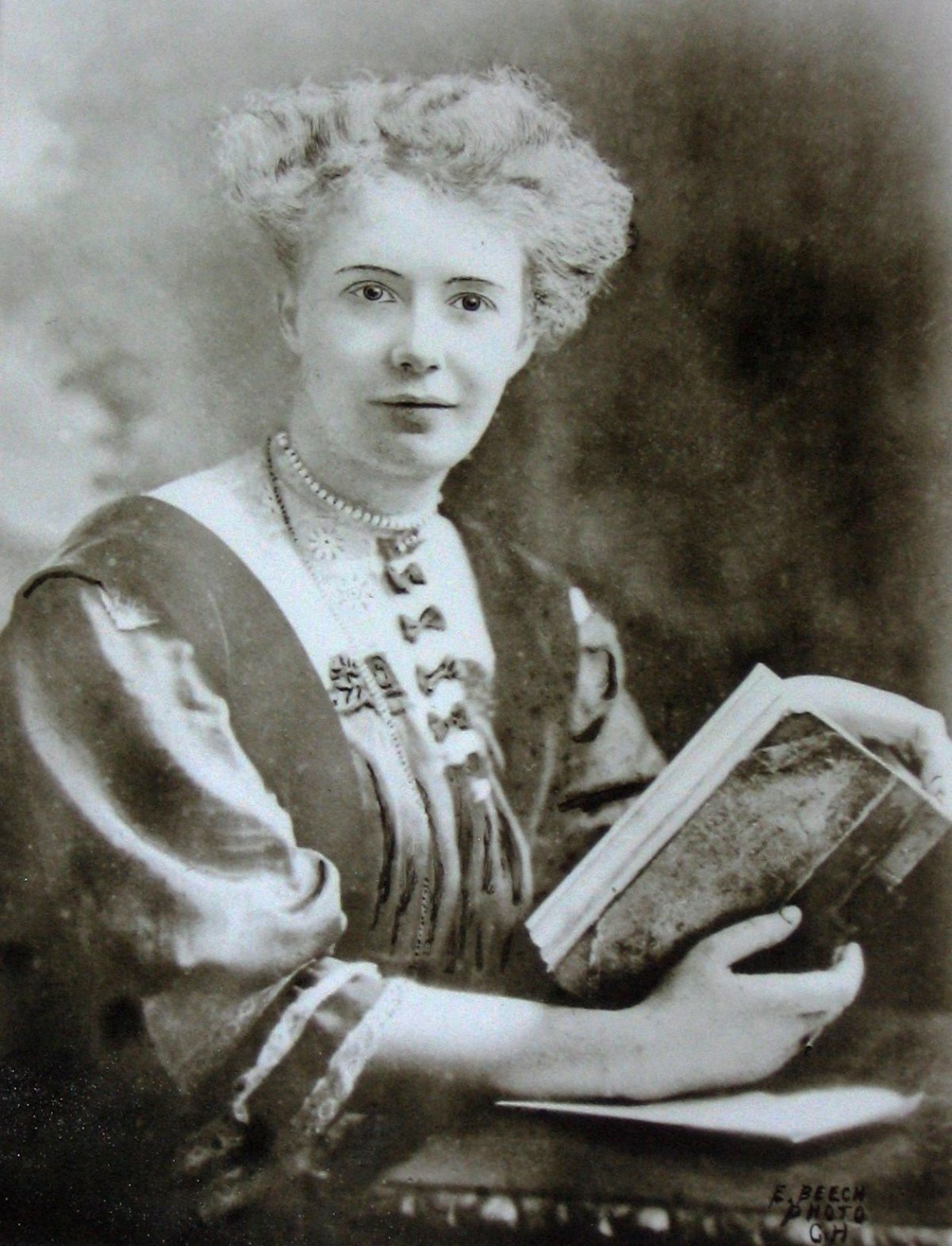
- Mary Macarthur was the original secretary of the CCWE
- Abbreviation: CCWE
- Formation: 20 August 1914

The Central Committee on Women's Employment, later known as the Central Committee on Women’s Training and Employment, was an organisation set up in the United Kingdom during the First World War to provide employment for women, especially those who had become unemployed due to the War. In 1920, it became a standing committee in the House of Commons.

== History ==
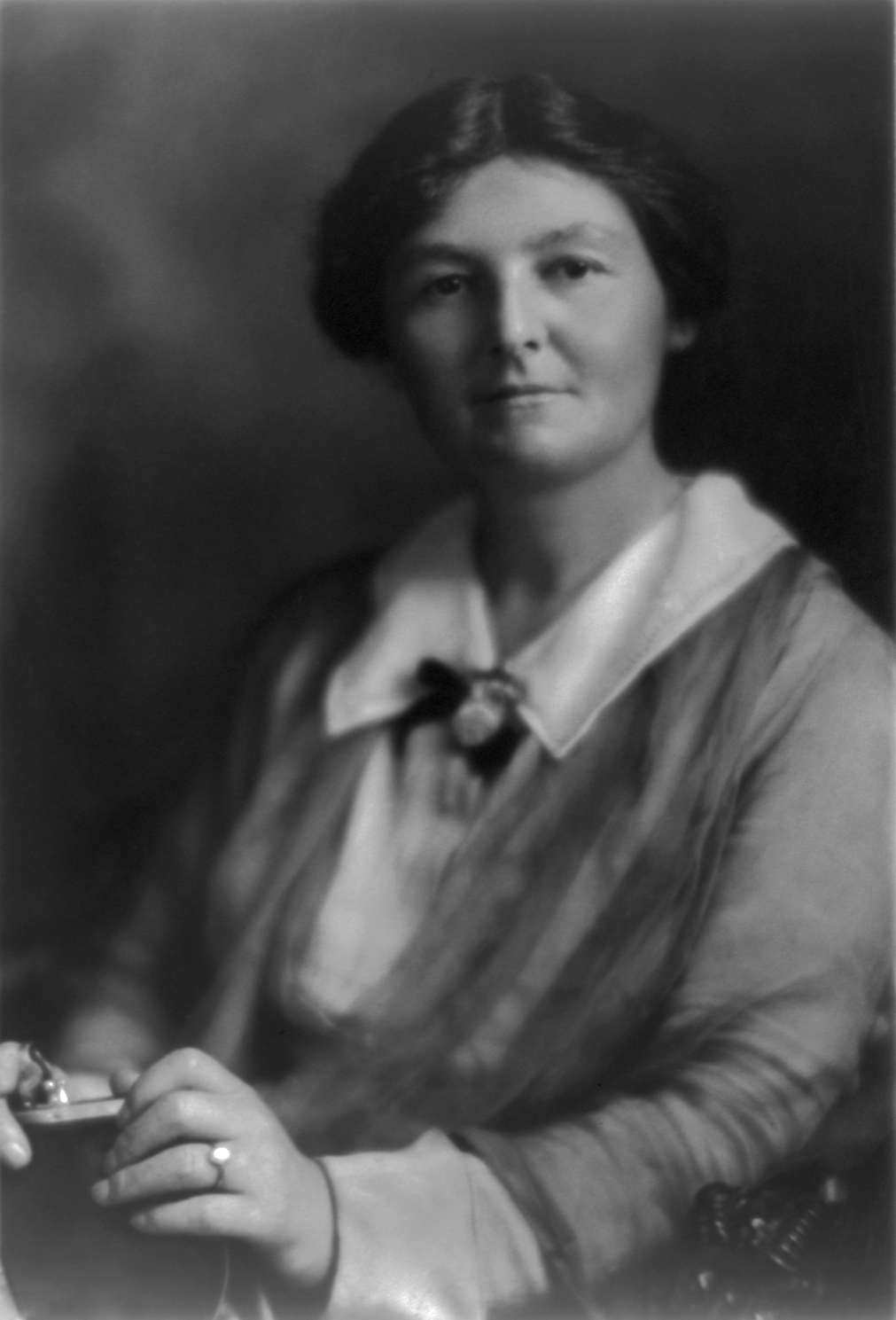
Margaret Bondfield, a member of the CCWE.

The Central Committee on Women's Employment (CCWE) was created on 20 August 1914, by the Home Secretary. The committee had fourteen members, of whom five were women. Lady Crewe, the wife of Robert Crewe-Milnes, 1st Marquess of Crewe, was appointed the chairman, Harold Tennant's wife Margaret was appointed the treasurer, and Mary Macarthur was appointed secretary of the organisation. Labour movement members Susan Lawrence, Margaret Bondfield, and Marion Phillips were also members of the committee. The CCWE received funding from the newly formed Ministry of Labour, and the Queen consort Mary of Teck donated money from the Queen's Fund. After the War, £500,000 was given from the National Relief Fund to the CCWE for women whose incomes and opportunities had been affected by the War.

The CCWE aimed to provide employment for women, especially those who had become unemployed or displaced due to the First World War. It initially encouraged women to take up war-related jobs, such as providing army clothes for the War Office and the British Army, and knitted jumpers for babies. The Labour movement through the committee campaigned for women's rights, in particular equal pay for equal work, and jobs at the end of the war, as well as the reduction of short time working hours for women. In September 1914, the employment rate for women was 8.5% lower than the previous month. In 1914, the minimum rate for women to be paid for relief work was 3d per hour, up to a maximum of 10/- including housing allowance. For other jobs, women could receive more than 3d, for example cleaners typically received 5d per hour.

After the War, the organisation became the Central Committee on Women's Training and Employment (CCWTE). The CCWTE focused on retraining women who became unemployed when the men returned. During the inter war years, Violet Markham was the CCWTE's chairwoman. In 1919, the government pledged HM Treasury money for "housecraft" training, and gave the CCWTE £50,000 to help with other training. In 1920, the Central Committee on Women's Employment became a standing committee in the House of Commons. Courses that trained women in midwifery, hairdressing, massage, teaching, as well as domestic work, ended in 1922 when funding ran out.

Using funding from the Empire Settlement Act 1922, the CCWTE set up a home training centre in Market Harborough, and later set up home training centres in Glasgow, Harrogate, Newcastle, Leamington Spa, and London.

== Other ==
In 1915, an Irish Central Committee for the Employment of Women (CCEW) was created, to serve a similar purpose in Ireland.
