= Torch Theatre, Dublin =

Theatre in Dublin

Torch Theatre
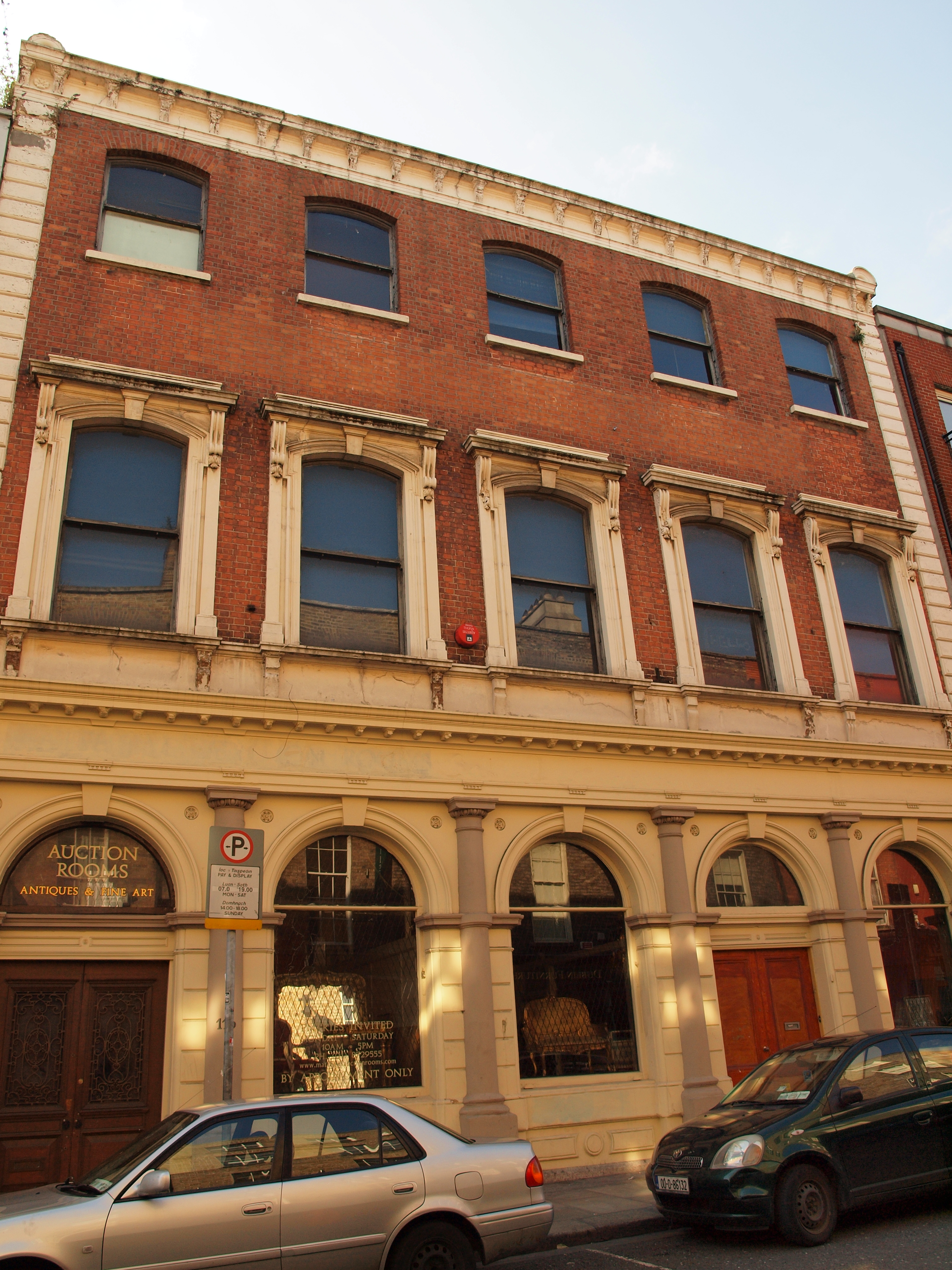
- The former Torch Theatre
- Address: 114–116 Capel Street; Dublin 1 Ireland
- Owner: Charles L. Keogh and Evelyn Lund
- Type: theatre
- Current use: Capel Street Antiques Market

Construction
- Opened: 1935
- Closed: 1941

The Torch Theatre was a theatre located in Capel Street, Dublin, which operated from 1935 to 1941.

== Establishment ==
The Torch Theatre was founded by husband and wife team Charles L. Keogh and Evelyn Lund and opened on 27 February 1935. The building had previously been used as the headquarters of the United Trades Council, with the meeting room being converted into the theatre space. Another founding member was the artist Lilian Davidson, who under the stage name "Jennifer Maud", designed scenery and was a co-director in 1936.

== Associations ==
The semi-professional company that was based out of the Torch Theatre specialised in productions of melodrama and opened with a production of The Colleen Bawn. The production later focused less on melodrama and more on light theatre, pantomime and comedies. Other plays the theatre produced were A Royal Divorce, In Memory of the Dead, Nell Gwynne, and Arrah-na-Pogue. Some of the actors who took part in these productions were F. J. McCormick, Eve Panton, and Harry Brogan. In 1936 Cyril Cusack directed and set designed a season of Irish language plays.

== Closure ==
The theatre was largely unprofitable and operated sporadically until 1941. The final production was a revue Sensations of 1940, directed by Dan Rockford. There is now a preservation order on the facade of the building.
