= Muriel Gahan =

Irish rural activist and promoter of crafts and co-operatives

- fair use image
- Born: Winifred Muriel Françoise Gahan; 27 October 1897; Magherabeg House, County Donegal, Ireland
- Died: 12 July 1995 (aged 97); Ballsbridge, Dublin

Muriel Françoise Gahan (27 October 1897 – 12 July 1995) was an Irish rural campaigner and a promoter of traditional crafts and of the cooperative movement. She commissioned the first adult Aran jumper, launched the Irish Homespun Society and helped lead the Irish Country Markets co-operative for decades. A founding member of Ireland's Arts Council, Gahan played significant roles in the Irish Countrywomen's Association and other bodies. She was the first female vice-president of the Royal Dublin Society and received an honorary doctorate from Trinity College Dublin and the Plunkett Award for Cooperative Endeavour.

== Early life ==
Winifred Muriel Françoise Gahan was born in Magherabeg House, near Donegal town, County Donegal on 27 October 1897. Her parents were Winifred (née Waters) and Fredrick George Townsend Gahan. Her father was a civil engineer with the Congested Districts Board and her mother was originally from Cambridgeshire and had been employed as a governess. She had at least one sister and four brothers. The family moved to Castlebar, County Mayo in 1900. Travelling around Mayo with her father for his work gave Gahan an insight into the depths of rural poverty which existed in communities.

Gahan was educated at home under the care of a governess and later attended a girls' school St Winifred's, in Llanfairfechan, Wales. She returned to Ireland in 1914 to attend Alexandra College until 1916. Whilst there she met her lifelong friend and collaborator Olivia Cruikshank, later Hughes. Gahan also played field hockey for Maids of the Mountain. The family lived in Rathmines, Dublin for a time, but returned to Castlebar in 1919. When her father retired in 1926, Gahan returned to Dublin.

== Career ==
In 1927 Gahan started her career as a painter and decorator with the Modern Decorator, an all-female firm. Through this work first came into contact with the United Irishwomen, a group founded in 1910 and which Gahan joined in 1929 when her friend Hughes invited her to paint the group's stand for the Royal Dublin Society (RDS) spring show. Gahan left her job in 1930 and along with other United Irishwomen opened a sales depot in Dublin, called the Country Shop, for the work of isolated rural craft workers who were unable to achieve proper prices for their work. Vawn Corrigan credits Gahan with the introduction of the adult Aran jumper as we know it today when she commissioned the first one in 1932. In 1935 the United Irishwomen changed their name to the Irish Countrywomen's Association (ICA). Through the ICA, Gahan met Lucy Franks, Mainie Jellett, and Vida Lentaigne.

In 1935 she launched the Irish Homespun Society in an effort to preserve some of the country's traditions, and was elected chair of the group in 1941. Exhibitions were held at the annual Dublin Spring Show. She was heavily involved in Irish Country Markets Ltd from 1946, a cooperative society marketing crafts and produce, serving as chairwoman until 1975. She was a member of the RDS from 1946, and served on its industries, art, and general purposes committee in 1948. She was among the founding members of the Arts Council in 1951, and was appointed to the council of the Arts and Crafts Society of Ireland and to the National Savings Committee in 1956. Corrigan believes that the confidence and sense of self-worth observable in the Irish Craft scene are part of Gahan's legacy.

Gahan advocated for the teaching of crafts in Ireland, and was successful in lobbying the National College of Art and Design to found a school of weaving. She was central to the ICA's securing funds from the Kellogg Foundation of America for An Grianán, a residential training college at Termonfeckin, County Louth. The college opened in 1954. She was awarded an honorary life membership of the ICA, in recognition of her work, in 1965. In 1974 she received the Allied Irish Banks Community Development Award, in 1978 she was awarded an honorary doctorate from Trinity College Dublin, and in 1984 she received the Plunkett Award for Cooperative Endeavour. She became the first female vice-president of the RDS in 1976.

== Death and legacy ==
Gahan retired from the ICA in 1992, and lived in Shankill, Dublin. She later moved to Ballsbridge, into St Mary's nursing home. She died there on 12 July 1995. A portrait of Gahan, painted by Edward McGuire, hangs in the council chamber of the RDS.

On 7 April 2011, The Muriel Gahan Museum of Irish History was opened at An Grianán. The museum is now home to many items of Irish history, craft and culture. The Muriel Gahan Scholarship of two thousand Euro is awarded annually at the RDS national crafts competition.
