= Anita Lett =

Irish activist who founded the Irish Countrywomen's Association

Anita Georgina Edith Lett
- Born: Anita Georgina Edith Studdy c. 1871; England
- Died: 5 June 1940; Enniscorthy, Ireland
- Other names: Anita Georgina Edith Beatty
- Known for: Founding the ICA

Anita Georgina Edith Lett (c. 1871 – 5 June 1940) was an Irish activist who founded the Irish Countrywomen's Association, originally known as the United Irishwomen.

== Early life ==
Anita Georgina Edith Studdy was born about 1871 in England to Captain Henry Studdy who was a Captain the Royal Navy.

She was married twice. Her first husband was Captain David Longfield Beatty. They were married on 9 January 1899 and later lived in Borodale, County Wexford, Ireland. She was his second wife. They had a son Flight Lieutenant Henry Longfield Beatty, born while they were living in Warwickshire, England on 4 March 1901. Her son died in a flying boat accident on 15 Feb 1935. Her first husband died on 4 April 1904.

== Career ==
Lett was a believer that the government was not the best organisation to take control of issues like the feeding of children in school. However she was also not prepared to sit back and watch children go hungry.

Lett believed, as did the organisation she helped to create, that a woman's place was in activism and the public sphere especially in areas like the Poor Law Guardians and local elected officials responsible for women's work and children's welfare.

The formation of the United Irishwomen began in 1908 and it took two years until the first formal meetings occurred. At the first meeting Lett discussed the importance of healthcare, education, fashion, horticulture, the rearing of children and the dullness of rural Ireland. The organisation held that women needed to be represented in government and their right to be elected to positions. With Lett's support the organisation was also instrumental in building clubs for women to play camogie. Lett was intent on women developing the role of women and the formation of a strong Irish identity.

Supporting her belief in the value of games for girls, Lett was the trainer for the Davidstown/Bree camogie team which won the district final in 1913.

== Later family ==
She married Harold Lett in Enniscorthy on 27 April 1909. They lived in Ballynapierce, Enniscorthy. She had a daughter, also Anita, on 22 January 1910 with her second husband. Harold Lett was the chairman of the local board of Guardians and a staunch loyalist. Lett died in 1940 of cirrhosis of the liver two years after her husband.
