= Termonfeckin =

Town in County Louth, Ireland

Termonfeckin Tearmann Feichín (Irish)
- Town
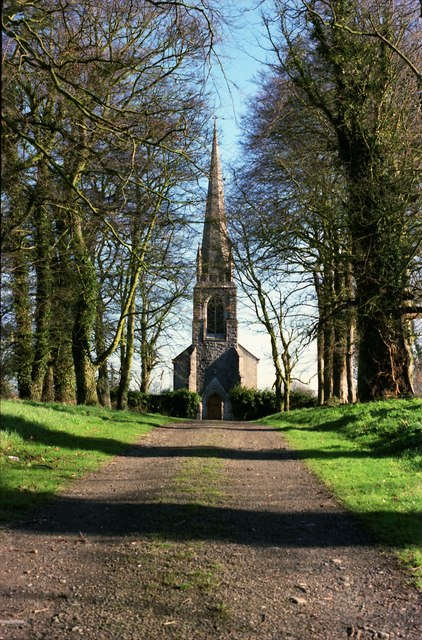
- St Féchín's Church

- Location in Ireland
- Coordinates: 53°46′N 6°16′W
- Country: Ireland
- Province: Leinster
- County: County Louth
- Municipal District: Drogheda Borough District
- Dáil constituency: Louth
- EU Parliament: Midlands–North-West
- Elevation: 25 m (82 ft)

Population (2022)
  - Total: 1,983
- Irish Grid Reference: O142806

Termonfeckin or Termonfechin (Irish: Tearmann Feichín, meaning 'Féchín's church land') is a town and townland in County Louth, Ireland. It is within a civil parish of the same name, and is 8 km (5.0 mi) north-east of Drogheda. The population of Termonfeckin almost quadrupled in the period between the 1996 and 2022 census, growing from 530 to 1,983 inhabitants.

== History ==
Tradition suggests that a medieval monastery was founded in the area by Saint Feichin of Fore in the 7th century. The monastic settlement was plundered by Vikings in 1013 and by the clan Ui-Crichan of Farney in 1025. The monastery was plundered again a century later (in 1149) by raiders from Bregia (Meath).

The village gained ecclesiastical importance in the late 12th century when an Augustinian monastery was founded in the village. A convent of nuns, also of the Augustinian order, was established shortly afterwards and while the monastery didn't survive, the convent flourished in Termonfeckin up until its eventual closure in 1540, following the Reformation of Henry VIII.

In medieval times it was a royal manor, possession of which might be granted to Crown servants in good standing, as in 1361.

== Economy ==
Termonfeckin is primarily dependent on the farming industry. Tourism also contributes to the local economy, and nearby Baltray and Seapoint, with their coasts and golf courses, attract visitors.

== Transport ==
Bus Éireann route 168 serves Termonfeckin several times a day, linking it to Drogheda, Duleek, Ashbourne and Clogherhead. Most buses operate via Baltray though a few go via Grangebellew and Ballymakenny. Drogheda railway station is approximately 9 km (5.6 mi) distant.

== Historical features ==
=== Termonfeckin Castle ===
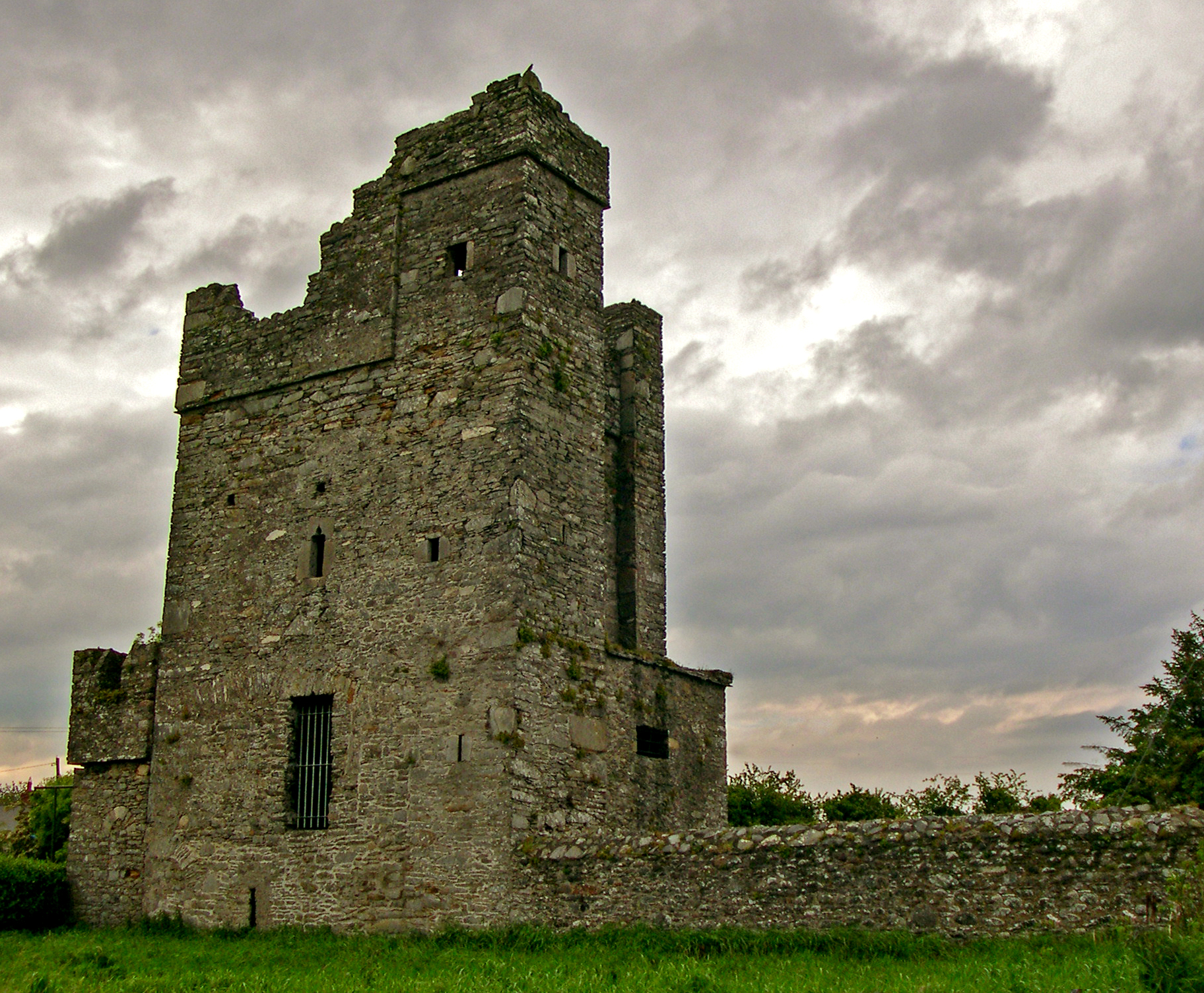
Termonfeckin Castle

The extant castle in Termonfeckin is a 15th- or 16th-century tower house of three storeys, with good trefoil headed windows. Its most unusual feature is the corbelled roof, similar to the technique used for the Newgrange chamber roof, which is on the third storey. This castle was damaged in the Irish Rebellion of 1641 but was later repaired by Captain Brabazon. It is now a National Monument.

=== Former Primate's Castle ===
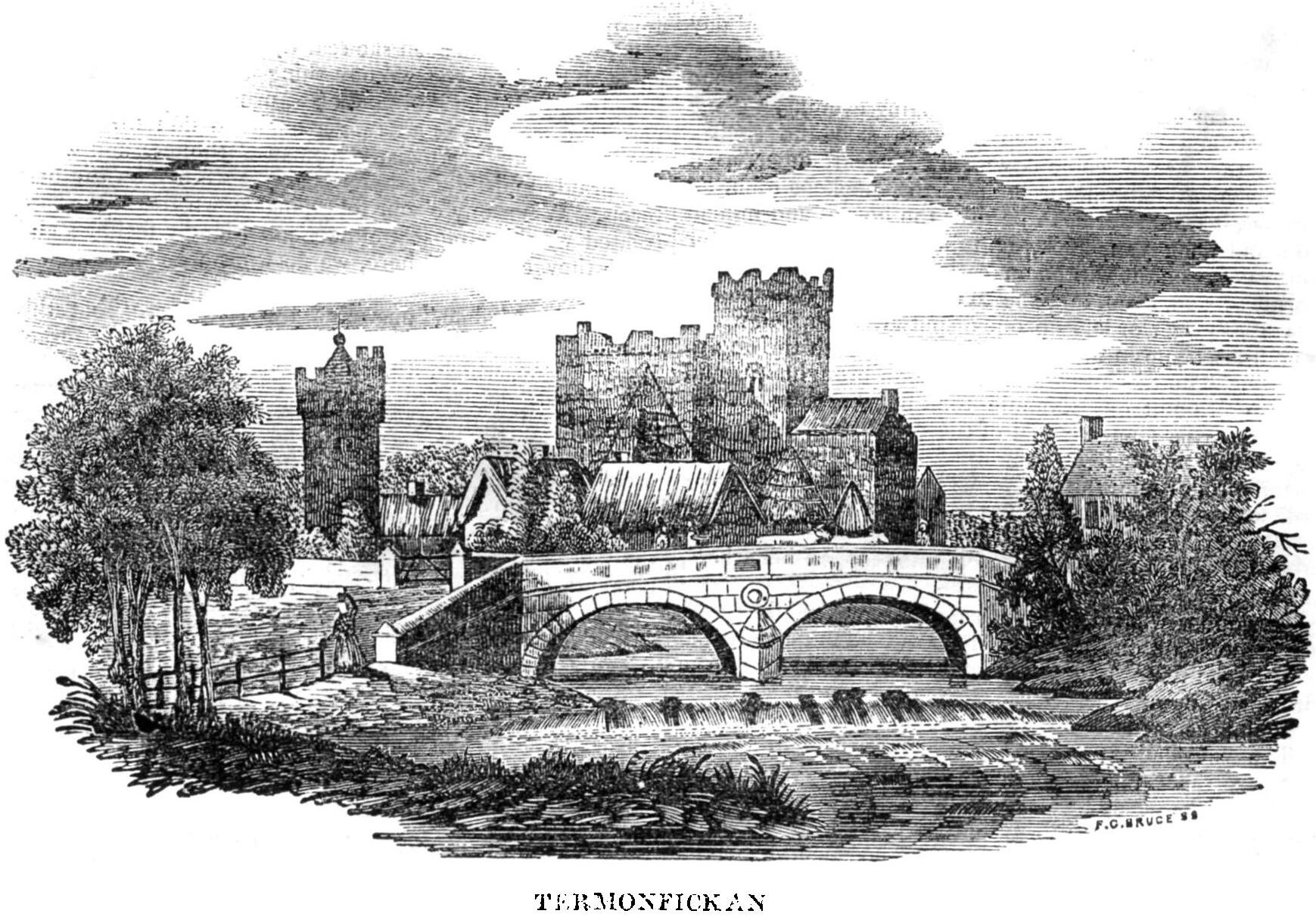
Termonfickan in the 19th century (1830s view from Dublin Penny Journal)

Until the early 19th century Termonfeckin also had another castle. This was the Primate's Castle which was used for several centuries by the Archbishops of Armagh (including Richard Creagh) as an auxiliary residence to their episcopal quarters in nearby Drogheda. After the Reformation, several Protestant Archbishops resided periodically in Termonfeckin. The castle's most famous occupant at this time was James Ussher who was Protestant Archbishop of Armagh from 1625 to 1656. He used the castle in Termonfeckin for much of his term up until 1640 when he departed for England, never to return. The castle was damaged in the 1641 Rebellion and was not repaired. It fell into disuse and was eventually demolished around 1830.

=== High Cross ===
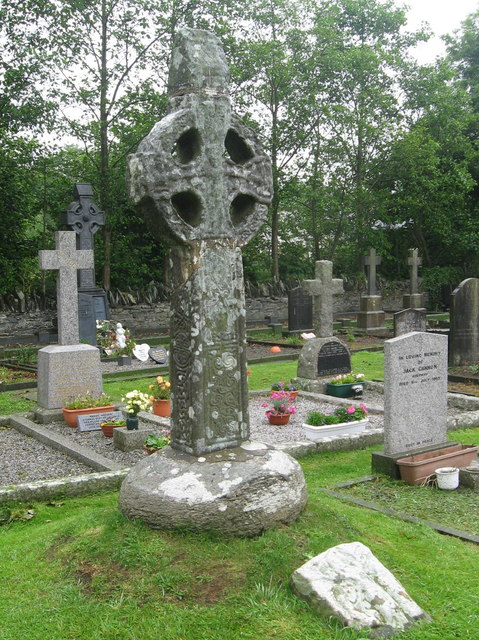
Termonfeckin High Cross, dating from the 9th or 10th century

In the graveyard of St. Fechin's Church of Ireland is a high cross with a winged figure above the Crucifixion on the east face, and Christ in Glory on the west face; the rest of the cross is covered in delicate interlacing and geometrical patterns. At the foot of the cross is a slab with a Crucifixion scene (probably 16th-century) and nearby is the base of another cross. Built into the porch of St. Fechin's church is a stone with an inscription that reads 'A prayer for Ultan and Dubthach who made this stone fort'.

=== An Grianan ===
Termonfeckin is also home to An Grianan, a stately home built in the 18th century which was the first residential adult learning college in Ireland. Owned by the Irish Countrywomen's Association, it fulfils many of that organisation's educational and social requirements. An Grianan was also a horticultural college until 2003.

== Sport ==
=== Gaelic games ===
Termonfeckin is home to St Fechin's GAA club. This Gaelic Athletic Association club plays in Páirc Naomh Feichin and field both Gaelic football and hurling teams. In Gaelic football, the club were Louth Senior Football Championship winners in 1983 and 1984, but now plays in the county's Intermediate Club Championship. The club's hurling teams won the Louth Senior Hurling Championship in 2021 and 2022.

=== Golf ===
There are two links courses in the area. Seapoint Golf Club is located in Termonfeckin, and County Louth Golf Club is located in Baltray.

=== Football ===
In 1997, Termonfeckin's senior football club was founded, with a junior team added in 2008. At the start of the 2015/2016 season, the club started a girls' junior football team.

== Notable people ==
- Evanna Lynch, actress, starred in the Harry Potter films as Luna Lovegood.
- Arthur Mathews, co-writer of sitcom Father Ted, grew up in Termonfeckin.
- Peter McKevitt, priest, author, and sociologist, served as parish priest from 1953 to 1976.
- Molesworth Phillips, who sailed with Captain Cook on his last voyage to the Pacific and who was present at his death in Hawaii. Molesworth had an estate in Termonfeckin and lived there for a time in the 1790s. His wife, Susan Burney, was a correspondent and a sister of the English author, Fanny Burney.
- Des Smyth, former European Tour golfer, Ryder Cup vice-captain and Champions Tour player.

== Annalistic references ==
- M1053.3 - Cormac Ua Ruadhrach, airchinneach of Tearmann-Feichin ... died.

== See also ==
- List of towns and villages in Ireland
