= Stephen Blair =

British politician

Member of Parliament for Bolton
- In office 12 September 1848 – 9 July 1852 Serving with Joshua Walmsley (1849–1852); John Bowring (1848–1849)
- Preceded by: William Bolling; John Bowring
- Succeeded by: Thomas Barnes; Joseph Crook

Personal details
- Born: 21 March 1804 Wigton, Cumberland
- Died: 5 July 1870 (aged 66)
- Party: Conservative

Stephen Blair JP (21 March 1804 – 5 July 1870) was a British Conservative politician.

The first Conservative Mayor of Bolton, holding the post from 1845 to 1846, Blair was elected Conservative MP for Bolton at a by-election in 1848—caused by the death of William Bolling—and held the seat until 1852 when he was defeated.

Blair was a prominent Freemason rising to Provincial Grand Master.

Upon his death, Blair donated £30,000 to be used for the building and running of Blair Hospital — named after him — in Bolton.

== See also ==
- John Hick

Parliament of the United Kingdom
Preceded by William Bolling; John Bowring	Member of Parliament for Bolton; 1848–1852; With: Joshua Walmsley (1849–1852); John Bowring (1848–1849)	Succeeded by Thomas Barnes; Joseph Crook
