= Charles Abel =

Charles Abel may refer to:

- Charles Abel (politician) (born 1967), politician in Papua New Guinea
- Charles Abel (missionary) (1863–1930), his great-grandfather, English Congregationalist missionary
- Charles Denton Abel (1831–1906), English patent attorney
