= Orlando Bridgeman (RAF officer) =

British World War I flying ace (1898–1931)

Orlando Clive Bridgeman
- Born: 29 November 1898; Donington, Shropshire, England
- Died: 21 December 1931 (aged 33); London, England
- Relatives: Orlando Bridgeman, 3rd Earl of Bradford (grandfather); Francis Bridgeman (father); Reginald Bridgeman (brother)
- Military career
- Allegiance: United Kingdom
- Branch: British Army; Royal Air Force
- Service years: 1917–1919
- Rank: Second Lieutenant
- Nickname: "Bridget"
- Service number: 68166
- Units: No. 70 Squadron RFC; No. 80 Squadron RAF
- Conflicts: World War I
- Awards: Military Cross

Second Lieutenant Orlando Clive Bridgeman MC (29 November 1898 – 21 December 1931) was a World War I flying ace credited with five aerial victories.

== Biography ==
Bridgeman was the fourth son of Brigadier-General the Honourable Francis Bridgeman and his wife Gertrude Cecilia (née Hanbury). His father was the second son of Orlando Bridgeman, 3rd Earl of Bradford.

He was educated at Harrow School. In early 1917, soon after his 18th birthday, Bridgeman joined the British Army as a cadet, and on 17 March was appointed a probationary temporary second lieutenant on the General List, attached to the Royal Flying Corps, being confirmed in that rank in August.

Bridgeman was posted to No. 70 Squadron RFC, flying the Sopwith Camel. He was wounded on 25 August after being shot up by Hermann Göring of Jagdstaffel 27.

He returned to active duty in March 1918, and was posted to No. 80 Squadron. On 16 March he gained his first aerial victory driving an Albatros D.V down out of control north-east of Le Catelet. On 28 March he was promoted to acting-captain to serve as flight commander of "B Flight", after the previous flight commander was killed. His second victory came on 11 April, setting an Albatros D.V on fire over Bois du Riez.

On 10 May Bridgeman was leading his flight on patrol, when they were engaged by between 20 and 30 enemy aircraft from Jagdstaffel 6 and 11, from Richthofen's "Flying Circus", over Morcourt. Bridgeman shot down two Fokker Dr.I, and two others were also shot down, but three of his own men were killed, one wounded and taken prisoner, and two more crash landed in British territory. Bridgeman was subsequently awarded the Military Cross, the only one received by a member of 80 Squadron. On 27 June Bridgeman gained his fifth and final victory, driving down a Fokker D.VII over Neuve-Chapelle. In July or August, he was assigned to serve as a flying instructor. Bridgeman finally left the service, being transferred to the unemployed list, on 11 April 1919.

Post-war Bridgeman graduated from Trinity College, Cambridge, with a Master of Arts degree. He married Nancye Newzam Nicholson (1899–1967) on 30 April 1924 at St George's, Hanover Square, London.

Bridgeman died in London of blood poisoning on 21 December 1931, aged 33, and is commemorated with a memorial plaque inside St Bartholomew's Church, Tong, Shropshire.

== Honours and awards ==
Military Cross

Temporary Second Lieutenant (Temporary Captain) Orlando Clive Bridgeman, General List, attached Royal Air Force.

For conspicuous gallantry and devotion to duty. The patrol he was leading was attacked by twenty or thirty enemy aeroplanes, of which he destroyed two himself, and by skilful manoeuvring enabled two others to be crashed by officers of his patrol. His tactics and gallantry undoubtedly prevented what might have been a severe reverse to his patrol. On many occasions his work in attacking troops and other ground targets from low altitudes has been excellent, and his example and skilful leadership have been of great value to his squadron.

== Bibliography ==
- Shores, Christopher F.; Franks, Norman; Guest, Russell (1996). Above the Trenches Supplement: A Complete Record of the Fighter Aces and Units of the British Empire Air Forces 1915-1920. London, UK: Grub Street. ISBN 978-1-898697-39-8.
