= John Hick (politician) =

English industrialist and politician (1815–1894)

John Hick Esq JP
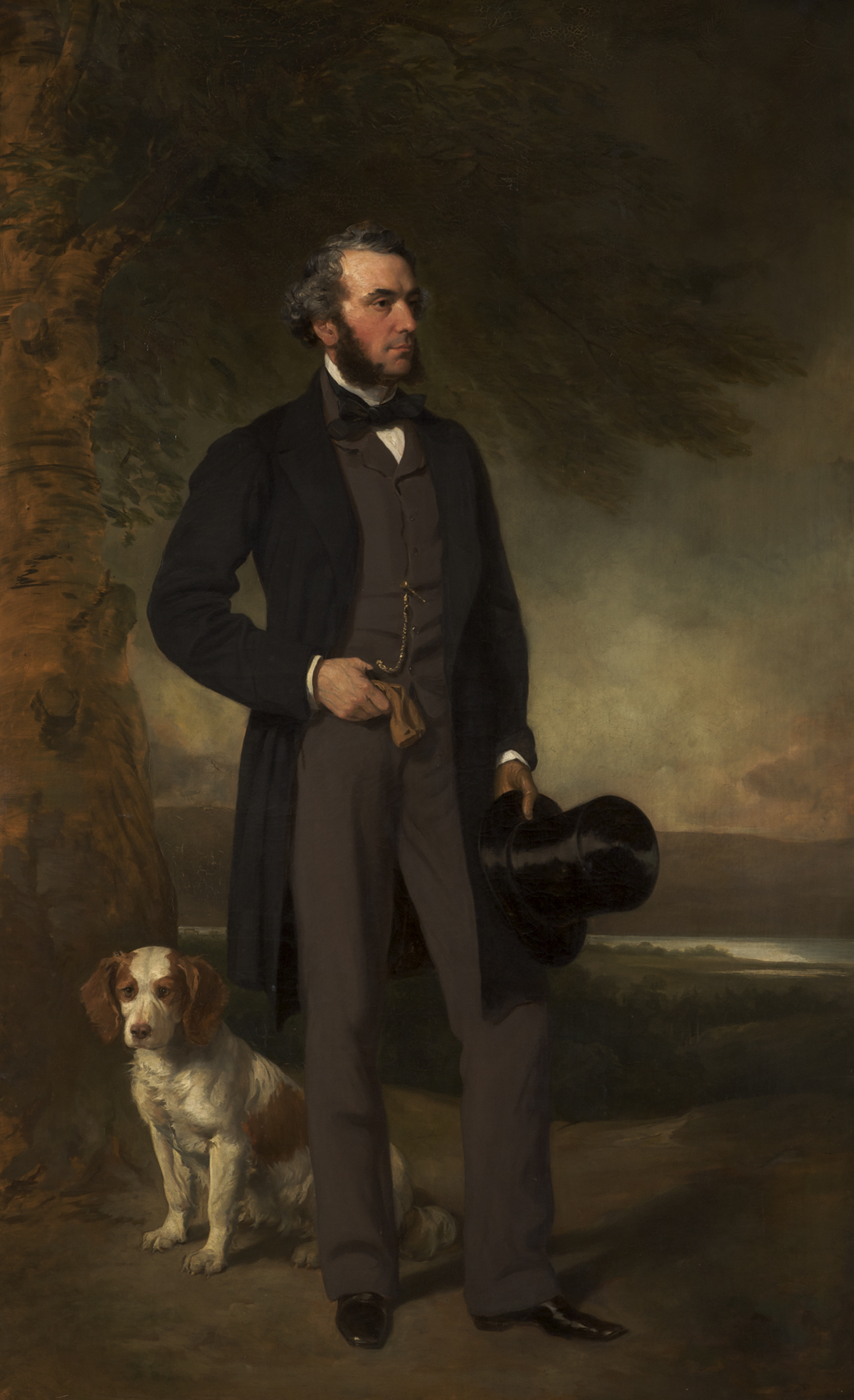
- May 1861 by Francis Grant RA (1803–1878)
- Born: 2 July 1815; Bolton, Lancashire, England
- Died: 2 February 1894 (aged 78); Whalley, Lancashire, England
- Occupations: Civil and Mechanical engineer Steel manufacturer Politician; Company director

John Hick JP DL (2 July 1815 – 2 February 1894) was an esteemed English industrialist, art collector and Conservative Party politician who sat in the House of Commons from 1868 to 1880, he is associated with the improvement of steam-engines for cotton mills and the work of his firm Hick, Hargreaves and Co. universal in countries where fibre was spun or fabrics woven.

== Family ==
Hick was the eldest son of Benjamin Hick (1790–1842), a civil and mechanical engineer responsible for improvements to the steam-engine, and his wife Elizabeth Routledge (1783–1826), daughter of William Routledge of Elvington Yorkshire. Elizabeth's brother and Hick's uncle, Joshua Routledge (1773–1829) also an engineer living in Bolton, designed the Engineer's Improved Slide Rule and patented improvements to the Rotary steam engine.

== Education and early career ==
Educated at a private school near Alderley, Cheshire and Bolton Grammar School where he received a commercial and classical education, Hick entered Benjamin Hick's Soho Works following school and from a young age, management of the Bolton engineering firm Benjamin Hick & Sons in partnership with his father during 1833.

About 1839, 'John Hick Jr' was awarded the silver medal by the Society of Arts for his novel invention of an expanding mandrel for turning lathes, it was an adaptation of a principle developed by Marc Brunel for pulley block manufacture at Portsmouth and received the praise of three eminent engineers; Bryan Donkin, Joshua Field and John Rennie. He was a member of the National Society for Promoting the Education of the Poor in the Principles of the Established Church in England and Wales in 1841.

During 1842, Hick was awarded a second silver medal by the Society of Arts for his invention of an Ellipsograph; conceived in 1840, the device provided a simple and accurate solution for drawing ellipsoid forms of various proportions. He received further praise from James Nasmyth, William Fairbairn, Joseph Whitworth, and amongst others, Charles Holtzapffel, Chairman of the Committee of Mechanics. Models of both devices were placed in the Society's repository. The ellipsograph and a diagrammatic model in wood of Hick's rotary engine produced in 1843 are held in the Science Museum collection.

Following their father's sudden death in September 1842, John and his youngest brother William (1820–1844) continued in the family business, while brother Benjamin (1818–1845) remained with George Forrester and Company. Benjamin also presented to the Society of Arts; in March 1844, with Benjamin Bond Cabbell in the chair, he outlined the ground breaking design published in October 1843, for his improved double-cylinder marine steam engine fitted to the PS Helen MacGregor. John was elected a Town councillor on 1 November 1844, serving three terms of three years until 1853 however, William who supervised the installation of their father's two-cyclinder beam engine at Temple Works, died of Tuberculosis on 23 November at Highfield House, the family home in Great Bolton; tragically Benjamin's death followed at Southport on 20 November 1845.

With his eldest sister Mary (1813–1878) in a position to help, Mary's husband was trusted to be a stable partner with the remaining capital to purchase the business from her father's estate and with the endorcement of the trustee bankers, Thomas Lever Rushton (1810–1883) and Robert Sharpe Barlow (–1858), John, who was also an executor, became senior partner in the family business with his brother-in-law John Hargreaves Jr (1800–1874) during 1845, he joined the Institution of Civil Engineers and Society of Arts in the same year. Hargreaves' youngest brother William (1821–1889) entered the partnership two years later. The family business would eventually become Hick, Hargreaves & Co.

During this period about 1845, John produced a 1:12 scale model of a high pressure two-cylinder design for a horizontal saw-mill engine, now displayed at the Institute of Mechanical Engineers; he was a founder and member from 1847 until 1852, and contributed a paper to the institute in 1849 on a friction clutch for connecting and disconnecting the driving power with shafts and machinery. A B. Hick & Son, 1:12 scale patent model of disconnecting apparatus, for screw propellers, c. 1855 is held in the Science Museum marine engines collection.

Following January 1847 Hick transferred his allegance from Bolton Athenaeum to Bolton Church Institute, later becoming Church Warden for James Slade and a Governor of Bolton Grammar School.

== Marriage ==
John Hick married Margaret Bashall (1824–1872), eldest daughter of industrialist William Bashall, partner in Bashall & Boardman of Farington Lodge, near Preston, at Penwortham Parish Church, Lancashire on 24 June 1846, they raised four daughters.

Following Margaret Hick's death 18 July 1872, Hick married the sister of his son-in-law, Rebecca Maria Ashworth (1838–1908), eldest daughter of Edmund Ashworth JP (1800–1881) of Egerton Hall on 16 December 1874 at Holy Trinity Church, Clapham; the couple were married by Margaret Hick's cousin and brother-in-law Reverend William Bashall (1830–1902), Vicar of Deane, Lancashire, by special licence from the Archbishop of Canterbury, Archibald Tait. Edmund Ashworth was a cotton manufacturer, proprietor of E. Ashworth & Sons and Egerton Mill, founder member of the Anti-Corn Law League with his brother Henry Ashworth (1794–1880) JP, in association with John Bright and Richard Cobden (Henry Ashworth's brother-in-law), and supporter of reforming, anti-slavery and peace organisations. The Ashworths are both thought to have been Oswald Millbank in Benjamin Disraeli's novel Coningsby. The two families (Hick and Ashworth) were linked by marriage in 1868 when Hick's first child and eldest daughter Margaret (1847–1929) married Edmund Ashworth Jr (1833–1901). The "highly respected" Reverend Bashall retired to the position of curate at St Barnabas church, Addison Road, Kensington from about 1876 remaining in the area until his death, 1902.

== The Great Exhibition ==
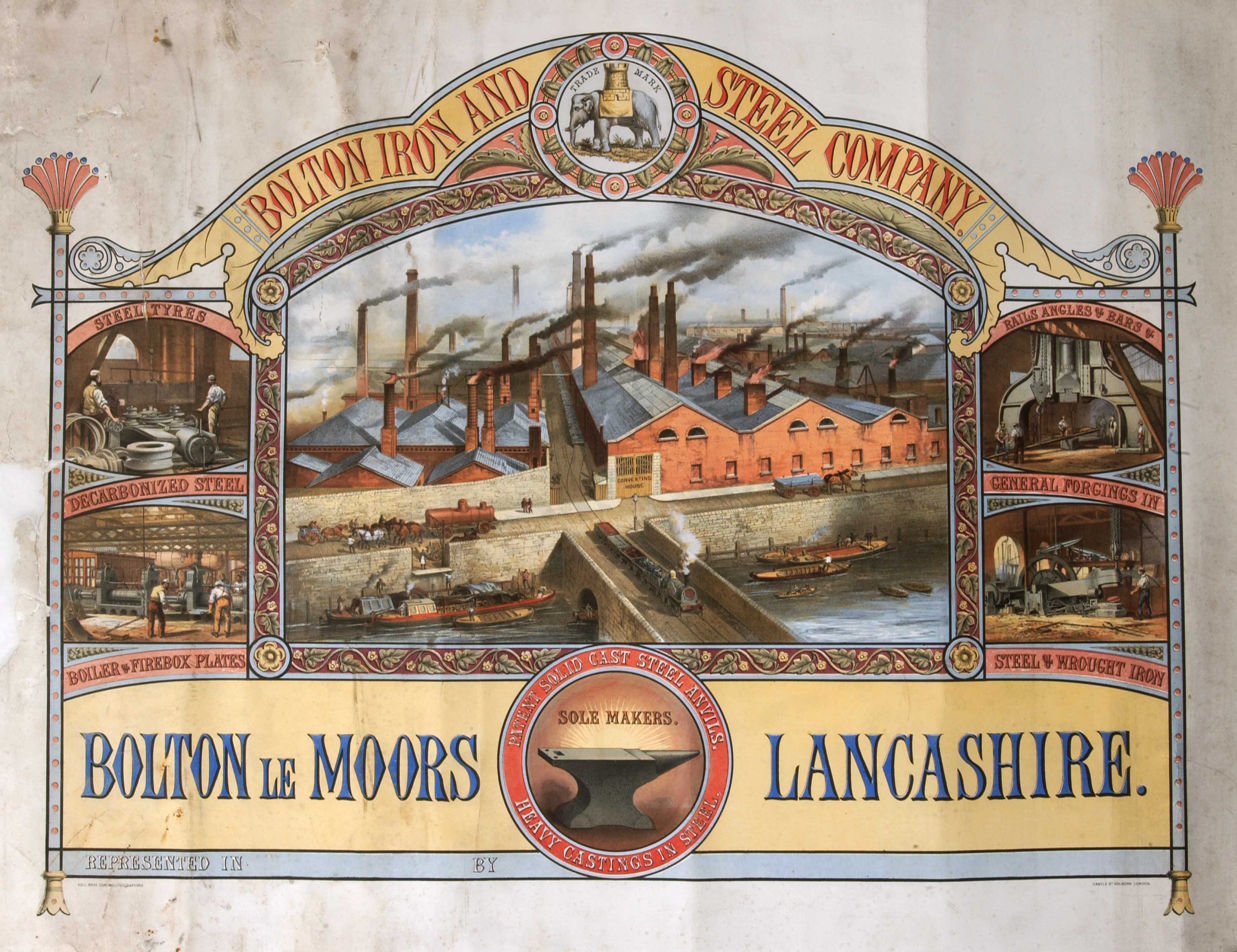
Bolton Iron and Steel Company certificate describing,"Steel Tyres, Decarbonized Steel, Boiler & Firebox Plates, Railes Angles & Bars & General Forgings ijn Steel & Wrought Iron, Heavy Solid Cast Steel Anvils. Heavy Castings in Steel.", showing the Nasmyth steam hammer and a 2-2-2 steam locomotive

1851 saw the Crystal Palace Exhibition in Hyde Park; early in 1850 Mayor of Bolton, Thomas Lever Rushton was appointed chairman of a committee to organise the town's efforts toward the Exhibition and presented as a Local Commissioner to Prince Albert at St James's Palace 18 March 1850.

While the family business of Benjamin Hick & Son displayed machinery and engineering models in the Crystal Palace, John Hick also sat as a United Kingdom Juror with the notable figures of Wilhelm Engerth, William Fairbairn, John Farey, Henry Maudslay (1822–1899), grandson of Henry Maudslay, Rev. Henry Moseley, Robert Napier and others for Class V. Machines for Direct Use, Including Carriages, Railway and Naval Mechanism. Condition 6. of the Exhibition's Decisions Regarding Juries restricted jurors from competing for prizes in the class to which they were appointed; prizes could not be awarded to the individual or the companies the Juror represented.

In 1855, Hick exhibited two pieces from his collection of artworks: The Stag Hunt and Lady Jane Grey and Roger Ascham by John Callcott Horsley in the Fine Art Division of the Exposition Universelle (1855) alongside his father-in-law William Bashall who presented The Madrigal, also by Horsley. Hick and Bashall used the same pair again for the 1857 Art Treasures Exhibition in Manchester with Cupid and Psyche by Benjamin West PRA and Crossing the Brook by Paul Falconer Poole.

Hick was a force behind the movement that led to the formation of the 27th Lancashire Rifle Volunteers from the Bolton area, he was offered command, but declined; The Regiment was formed on 15 November 1859 following tensions between the United Kingdom and France and the out break of war between France and the Austrian Empire during April of the same year. William Gray MP JP (1814–1895) and former Mayor of Bolton became Lieutenant Colonel 1 January 1861; John Hick's nephew Benjamin Hick (1845–1882), manager in Hick, Hargreaves & Co, was made a Captain 16 March 1872, resigning his commission about four years later 23 February 1876.

== Bolton Iron and Steel Company ==
In 1860, partners in B. Hick & Son, John Hick and William Hargreaves joined Thomas Lever Rushton's brother-in-law Henry Sharp as partners in Sharp and Eckersley, formerly Rushton and Eckersley before Rushton's retirement from the firm in 1859. The three partners Sharp, Hick and Hargreaves formed the Bolton Iron & Steel Company; situated next door to Rothwell's Union Foundry (on the site of Bolton's old bus station) the company supplied basic metals required by the major manufacturers in the area. Bessemer steel making began about 1860 – four six-ton Bessemer converters were installed during the 1860s, and experiments with the Sieman's open-hearth process began in 1867. Rolling, casting and forging equipment was installed, its products included steel deck beams for ships and sheet metal for shovels, during 1865 Bolton Iron & Steel cast the largest anvil block made in England, weighing 210 tons. By 1869 the company was making open hearth steel and manufacturing steam hammers to the design of Francis Webb. Hick's nephew, Benjamin became a shareholder following incorporation on 9 June 1876.

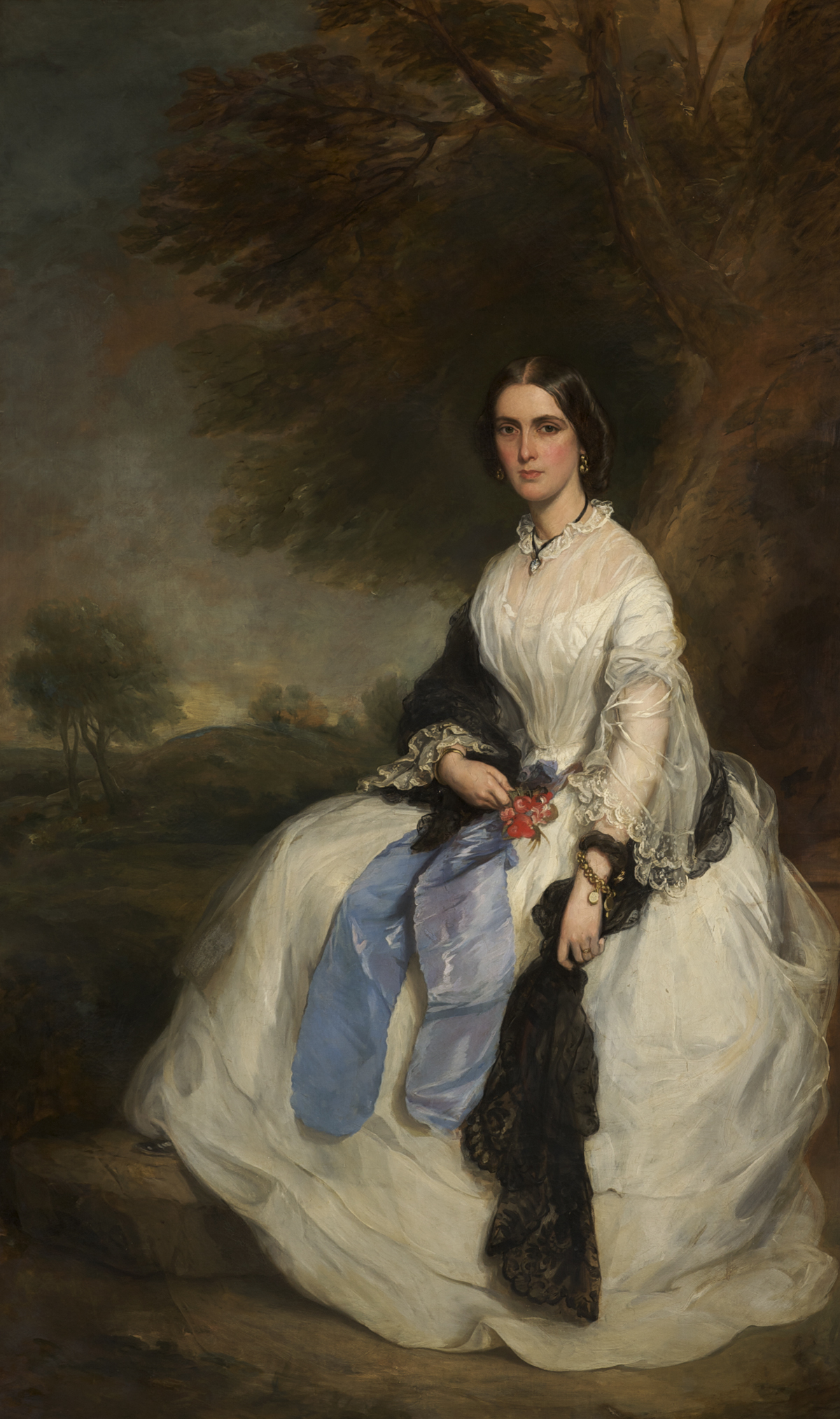
Mrs Margaret Hick by Francis Grant RA, presented at the Royal Academy of Arts, May 1861

About 1861 society painter Francis Grant produced portraits of John Hick and his wife Margaret, both works eventually hung together in the family home at Mytton Hall. Between 1860 and 1865 a studio portrait photograph of Hick by Maull and Polyblank was published as part of a series of 58 Victorian scientists, engineers, explorers etc. Hick was an associate of Bolton engineer, artist and photographer Reuben Mitchell (1812–1895), and pursued his own interest in photography; a liberal patron of the fine arts he was a supporter of Copley Fielding, William Powell Frith, Patrick Nasmyth, Samuel Prout, Edward Matthew Ward and others; the engineer and artist James Nasmyth described John Hick as an "excellent friend".

Now a Justice of the Peace for the Borough of Bolton and Salford Hundred, he sat again as a Juror for the 1862 International Exhibition in Class VIII, Machinery in General with others including his Swiss brother-in-law Louis Rudolf Bodmer, French Vice President of the exhibition M. Michel Chevalier and President of the Institute of Civil Engineers John Hawkshaw.

In March 1862, Hick delivered 2 lectures on self help to the Holy Trinity Working Men's Association, Bolton. Samuel Smiles notes that Hick embodied a personal account prepared for him by James Nasmyth. In the same year Hick became warden for St Peter's church Belmont, Lancashire and maintained a flock of 'hoggets' from his estate at Hill Top.

Hick wrote a history of Timothy Hackworth's locomotive Sans Pareil and presented the restored engine to the Patent Office Museum (now the Science Museum) in 1864, he also photographed William M. Gowland for Bennett Woodcroft. Gowland was driver of Hackworth's Royal George and driver of Sans Pareil at the Rainhill Trials.

Sans Pareil was previously owned by Hick's brother-in-law and eventual business partner John Hargreaves Jr (1800–1874) who had the engine fully repaired and running on the Bolton and Leigh Railway in 1837. Sans Pareil is now housed at the National Railway Museum's Shildon Locomotion Museum annexe.

In 1867, Hick first published a paper, reprinted from The Engineer, 1 June 1866, Experiments on the Friction of the Leather Collars in Hydraulic Presses, that expanded on the work of Dr William Rankine, describing an important series of experiments carried out using a joint invention of Hick and Robert Lüthy (1840–1884), a Swiss engineer, initially employed by Hick as a draughtsman and inventor of a hydraulic cotton packing press. Hick's father was the inventor of the self tightening collar, used universally in hydraulic presses.

== Parliament ==
On 17 November 1868 Hick was elected as Member of Parliament (MP) for Bolton. After election and to avoid a conflict of interest, he immediately resigned his position within Hick, Hargreaves and Co., the firm were already in possession of government contracts, and withdrew from the Bolton Iron and Steel Company. During this period he stayed in St James's, Piccadilly, his first wife and family remaining at Hill Top, Belmont an extensive late 18th century manor house rented from a local family.

About July 1870, John Hick was trustee to the estate of former Bolton mayor and MP Stephen Blair with Thomas Lever Rushton, William Hargreaves and others, empowered to build and furnish a 'free hospital for sick persons without limit of domicile'. Blair Hospital, now demolished was built on land donated by mayor James Knowles at Bromley Cross. Hick was Deputy Lieutenant for the County Palatine from 1870 until his death

He was a liberal Conservative in favour of education based on religion, a supporter of the general principles of the Education Act 1870 and an adherent to the view that religious and secular education should not be separated; his support for Bolton Church Institute extented to the gift of a fine stained glass window. As a Conservative he was a member of the Carlton, Conservative and St Stephen's Clubs.

John Hick was actively involved in debates about the welfare of people working in factories with steam boilers and in May 1870 chaired a Select Committee to investigate steam boiler explosions; following the report in August 1870, he introduced a Bill "...to provide a more efficient remedy to persons injured and property damaged by the explosion of steam boilers through negligence". Residing in the Bolton Poor Law Union, he retained his position in the County magistracy associated with Little Bolton Town Hall, that was at the time an exclusively male power structure formed of prominent local figures.

Hick was member of the Mechanical Inventions and Scientific Inventions, (Division III), Committee for the 1871 International Exhibition at South Kensington and a director of the London and North Western Railway (LNWR) under the chairmanship of Sir Richard Moon and Lord Richard Grosvenor from 1871 until his death, taking an active interest in the development of the LNWR system.

In April 1871 he seconded a motion by Colonel Barttelot (1820–1893), Conservative MP for Sussex Western 1860–1885, for a Select Committee "...to inquire into the merits of the Martini-Henry Rifle...whether it is the most suitable rifle as compared with others now manufactured to arm our troops with." He rejoined the Institute of Mechanical Engineers in the same year, proposed by Frederick Bramwell and sat on the Committee of Selection for Scientific and New Discoveries for the 1872 International Exhibition. He was elected a Member of Council for the Institute in the same year. His first wife, Margaret died at Hill Top in July 1872.

For his contribution to the Permanent Committee for the Representation for British Pictures of the 1873 International Exhibition Hick was presented with a bronze medal, he also sat as a Juror for Class XIV. — Recent Scientific Inventions and New Discoveries. Following, he was a member of the same British Pictures committee for the 1874 International Exhibition with fellow MPs Henry Bolckow, Alexander Brown, Henry Eaton, Joshua Fielden, William Graham, John Snowdon Henry, John Pender and others. He also sat on the Committee for Division III. Class XIV. — Recent Scientific Inventions and New Discoveries of All Kinds.

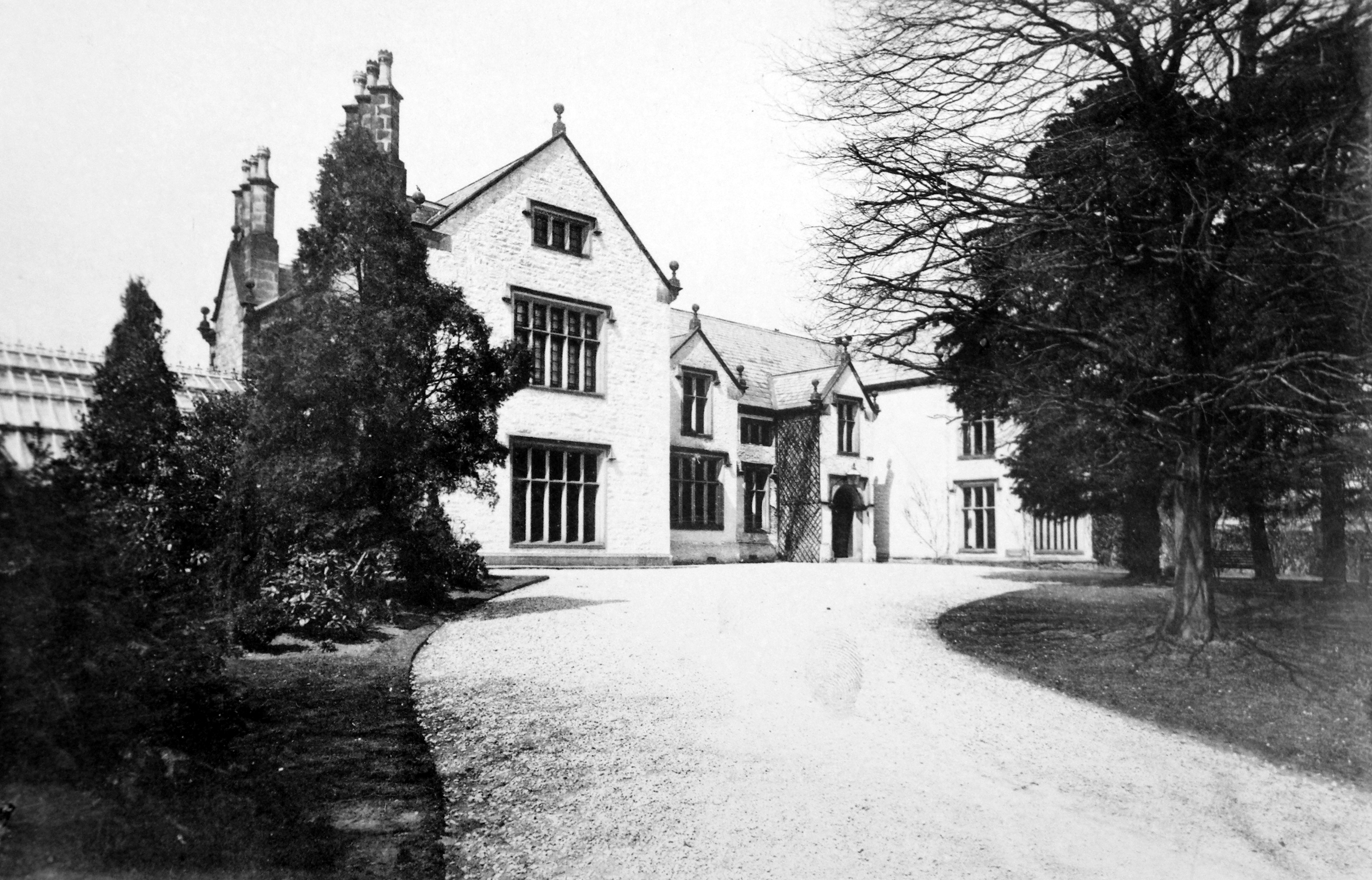
Mytton Hall – entrance c.1893, by Thomas Parkinson, Bolton.

Hick debated Supply – Army Estimates, June 1873 drawing attention to the improvement of heavy ordnance. As a parliamentarian he was frequently consulted by Government on subjects relating to armaments and the construction of boilers for war-vessels, he also served on a Select Committee appointed June 1874 to investigate the testing of chain cable and anchors for the Navy and as Vice President of the Institute of Mechanical Engineers between 1874 and 1876.

Hick relinquished his role as Church Warden for St Peter's church, Belmont during 1874, about the time he took up residence at Little Mytton Hall, thereafter undertaking restoration of the great hall; he also commissioned stained glass by Edmonson of Manchester, based on illustrations by 'Seymour' from Robert Stuart's history of the steam engine. Hick became a Justice of the Peace for Whalley, Lancashire in the same year; he was an executor for the estate of his brother-in-law, John Hargreaves from March 1875 following Hargreaves' death at Silwood Park, Sunninghill 18 December 1874, two days after Hick's marriage to Rebecca Ashworth.

Later in March 1875 he chaired the 22nd Anniversary Festival of the London Association of Foreman Engineers and Draughtsman at the City Terminus Hotel, Canon Street. With covers laid for 400, in the presence of Lord Lytleton, MPs Joseph Dodds, John Walter, Captain Bedford Pim, Major Frederick Beaumont and others, Hick's speech praised the Army, Navy, Marines and particularly Volunteer Reserve Forces with reference to his local Artillery Brigade; he noted, "It is a matter of congratulation that we have no great war going on at the present day". The event was reported in and associated with The Times newspaper, through John Walter MP.

Between about 1875–1880, at considerable expense, Hick carried out alterations on Mytton Hall, apparently to the design of Paley and Austin, Lancaster, including a substantial 2-story bay window, recreation block with a billiard room, joined to the house by a long, arched conservatory and ultimately a ballroom.

Widowed with eight children, Hick's elder sister Mary (1813–1878) moved from Silwood Park to Queen's Gate, South Kensington, but died there just over 3 years later, 4 January 1878. Around this time Hick began to use a summer residence at Woodlands, Lezayre, Isle of Man, where he also became a Justice of the Peace. By then Hick was described as a man of great wealth.

On 15 March 1879, towards the end of his time as an MP, John Hick with J. Turay and Charles Denton Abel of 20 Southamptom Buildings, an address associated with Abel & Imray, Lt Colonel Francis Bolton, Colonel Frederick Beaumont, Liberal MP for South Durham 1868–1880, Alexander Brogden JP of John Brogden and Sons, Liberal MP 1868–1885 for Wednesbury and J.T. Jones registered the Aqueous Works and Diamond Rock-boring Company (Limited), Crown Works, Guildford Street, York Road, Lambeth. Between the Thames side marine engine workshops of Maudslay, Son & Field and the General Lying-In Hospital - a short walk over Westminster Bridge from St Stephen's Club and the Houses of Parliament, the company with £300,000 capital in £5 shares "...bought out and patented the system of using diamonds for boring". The Aqueous Works and Diamond Rock-boring Company liquidated about 1892.

He debated Railway accidents – the adoption of continuous brakes, June 1879. As a director of LNWR, Hick defended the railway's position, stating he "regarded all automatic machinery with distrust". He was elected a member of the Iron and Steel Institute the same year and held the Bolton seat until 24 March 1880 when as a result of ill-health, he chose not to stand for re-election. Around 1880 Mytton Hall and the estate were being run as a farm, producing its own celebrated Cheese.

== Pollution trial ==
After leaving parliament Hick and Lt Colonel Ralph John Aspinall JP, DL, campaigned against the pollution and poisoning of salmon and trout in the River Ribble and its tributaries by local industry; Hick raised the issue of pollution in the Ribble during the third reading of the Rivers Pollution Prevention Act 1876 (39 & 40 Vict. c. 75). Aspinall and Hick fought a publicised and successful legal battle in the Court of Chancery against the cotton mills of Mitchell and Carlisle during July 1880 leading to a landmark judgement that set a precedent for controlling environmental pollution.

The river ran close to Mytton Hall where landlord Aspinall held the fishing rights and John Hick was lessee. The trial was presided over by the Vice-Chancellor of England, Sir James Bacon. In December 1880 Hick and Aspinall received presentations at Mytton Hall from the local angling community in recognition of "...their services in preventing pollution to the River Ribble and its tributaries".

Hick delivered a lecture entitled Self Help, reprinted and published by the Bolton: Chronicle Office in 1884. On 2 October of the same year he retired from his role as President of Bolton Photographic Society, established in 1879. He was appointed with other notable figures to the extensive Committee of Advice for the International Inventions Exhibition, 1885 at South Kensington.

== Science Museum ==
During 1887 Hick was a member of the Mechanical Collections Committee chaired by John Slagg, MP with other experts and politicians; Sir William Armstrong, Sir Joseph Bazelgette, James Brunlees, Edward Cowper, Professor Thomas Minchin Goodeve, Sir Charles Gregory, James Howard MP, Charles Manby, John Hinde Palmer, Sir Edward Reed MP and Sir Bernhard Samuelson MP established with several committees for the purpose of advising a central committee appointed by the Treasury to investigate the forming of a Science Museum and National Gallery of Portraits in South Kensington, situated between the Natural History Museum and what was to be the Imperial Institute.

== Death ==
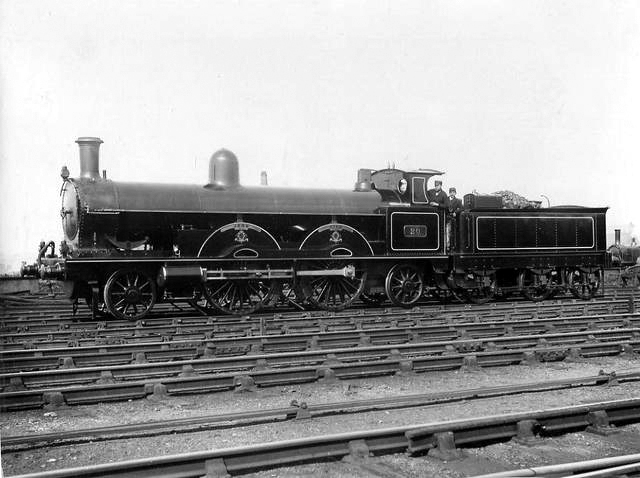
LNWR engine no. 20 John Hick, built at Crewe Works

After some months of failing health, Hick died age 78 at Mytton Hall, Whalley, Lancashire where he lived.

Like his father Benjamin, John Hick accumulated a large and valuable collection of art works, some of which was inherited, others purchased from the auction of Benjamin Hick's estate in 1843. He devoted his final years at Mytton Hall to compiling an elaborately illustrated catalogue of the collection; some of these works were auctioned by Christie's during June and July 1909 following Rebecca Hick's death in October 1908. The Hick library at Mytton Hall was dispersed at Capes Dunne & Co. Manchester in November 1909.

Hill Top, the family home Hick shared with his first wife Margaret was destroyed by fire about this time.

From the year of his death the London North Western Railway (LNWR) produced 10 steam locomotives of the John Hick Class (1894–1912); a Francis Webb design of 2-2-2-2 configuration, engine No. 20 named John Hick. The following 9 engines were named after engineers and inventors, principally from the Industrial and Second Industrial Revolution: No. 1505 Richard Arkwright, No. 1512 Henry Cort, No. 1534 William Froude, No. 1535 Henry Maudslay, No. 1536 Hugh Myddelton, No. 1548 John Penn, No. 1549 John Rennie, No. 1557 Thomas Savery and No. 1559 William Siemens.

Hick was unique in that he was the only LNWR director to have a locomotive class named after him in memoriam.

Following withdrawal of the John Hick Class in 1912, during the month of the anniversary of Hick's death, February 1913, 5 of 6 names were transferred to the LNWR George the Fifth Class, locomotive No. 752 named John Hick, serving up to 1935 with the London Midland and Scottish Railway (LMS).

== See also ==
- Johann Georg Bodmer
- Gerasim Ivanovich Khludov

Parliament of the United Kingdom
Preceded by William Gray; Thomas Barnes	Member of Parliament for Bolton; 1868 – 1880; With: William Gray; John Kynaston Cross	Succeeded by John Pennington Thomasson; John Kynaston Cross
