= William Bolling =

William Bolling may refer to:

- Bill Bolling (born 1957), Republican Lieutenant Governor of the US State of Virginia
- William Bolling (British politician) (1785–1848), British Tory (and later Conservative) Member of Parliament for Bolton 1832–1841 and 1847–1848
