= John Kynaston Cross =

- Cross in 1880

Under-Secretary of State for India
- In office 16 January 1883 – 9 June 1885
- Monarch: Victoria
- Prime Minister: William Ewart Gladstone
- Preceded by: Viscount Enfield
- Succeeded by: The Lord Harris

Personal details
- Born: 13 October 1832
- Died: 20 March 1887 (aged 54)
- Party: Liberal
- Spouse: Emily Carlton (d. 1911)

John Kynaston Cross (13 October 1832 – 20 March 1887), was a British cotton spinner and Liberal Party politician. He served as Under-Secretary of State for India under William Gladstone from 1883 to 1885.

== Background ==
Cross was the second of the thirteen children of John Cross and his wife Hannah, daughter of Richard Kynaston. He inherited the cotton-spinning firm of Cross and Winkworth, which was at the time one of the largest such firms in Lancashire.

== Political career ==
Cross entered Parliament for Bolton in 1874, a seat he held until 1885, when he was defeated. In 1883 he was appointed Under-Secretary of State for India in the second Liberal administration of William Ewart Gladstone, a post he retained until the government fell two years later.

== Family ==
Cross married Emily (née Carlton). They had five sons and three daughters. Cross suffered from diabetes which caused severe depression. He committed suicide by hanging in March 1887, aged 54. His wife died in 1911.

Cross was a collector of the works of Ary Scheffer.

Parliament of the United Kingdom
Preceded by William Gray; John Hick	Member of Parliament for Bolton; 1874–1885; With: John Hick 1874–1885; John Pennington Thomasson 1880–1885	Succeeded by Herbert Shepherd-Cross; Francis Bridgeman
Political offices
Preceded by Viscount Enfield	Under-Secretary of State for India; 1883–1885	Succeeded by The Lord Harris
