= Henry Torrens (British Army officer, born 1779) =

British Army officer (1779–1828)

Major-General Sir Henry Torrens KCB
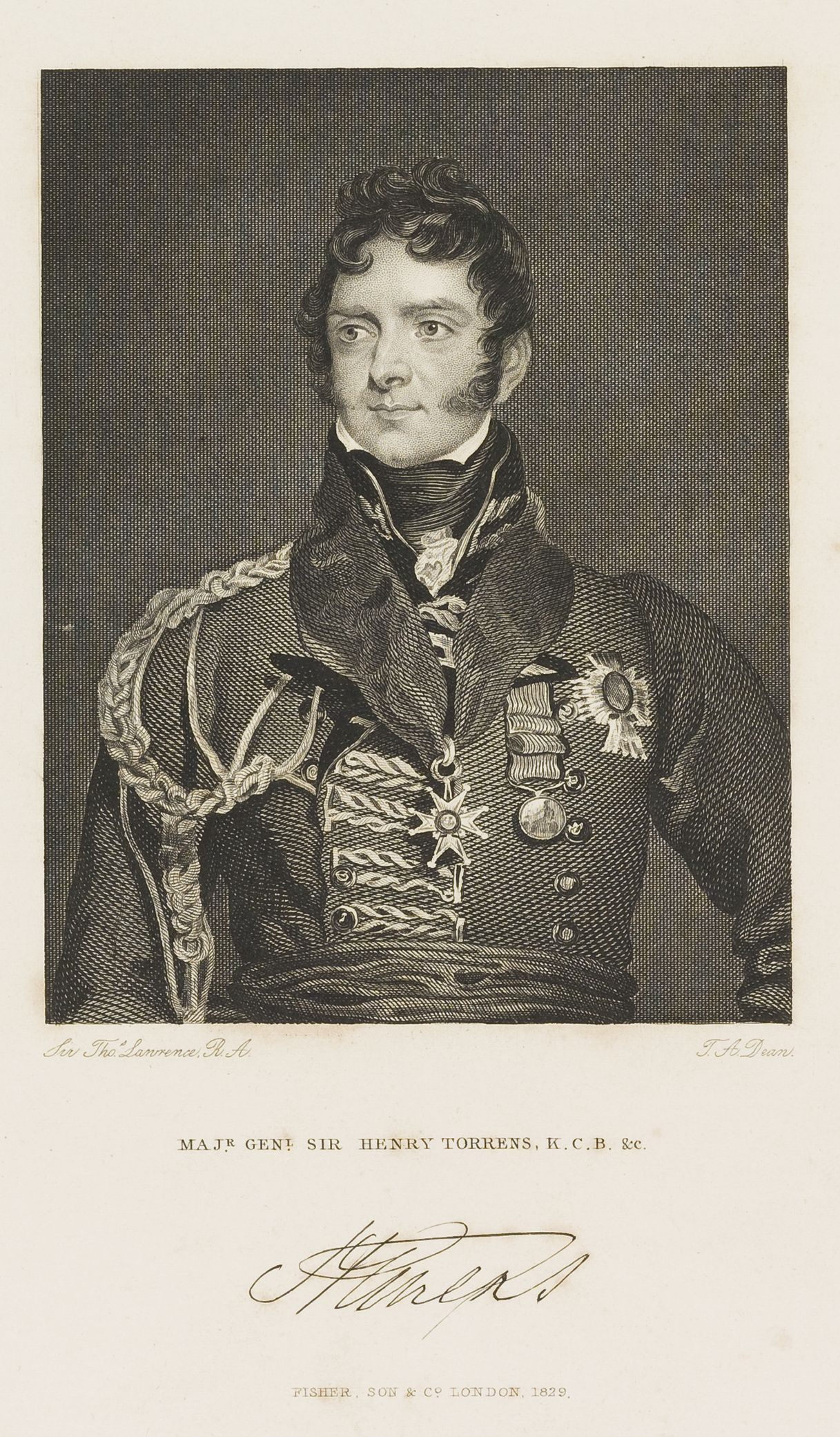
- Major-General Sir Henry Torrens
- Born: 1779; Derry, Kingdom of Ireland
- Died: 23 August 1828 (aged 48–49)
- Military career
- Allegiance: United Kingdom
- Branch: British Army
- Rank: Major-General
- Awards: Knight Commander of the Order of the Bath

Major-General Sir Henry Torrens KCB (1779 – 23 August 1828) was an Adjutant-General to the Forces.

== Early life ==
Torrens was born in Derry, Ireland in 1779. He was the youngest son of the Reverend Thomas Torrens and his wife Elizabeth Curry. He lost both his parents at an early age, and was educated at a military academy in Dublin. Robert Torrens, judge of the Court of Common Pleas (Ireland), was his brother and Robert's namesake Colonel Robert Torrens, the economist, was his first cousin. The family was of Swedish origin, and came to Ireland about 1690 with William of Orange.

== Military career ==
Torrens was commissioned as an ensign into the 52nd (Oxfordshire) Regiment of Foot in 1793 at the age of 14. In 1796 he served under Abercrombie in the West Indies, where he displayed great bravery, was wounded, and rewarded with a company. He served in Portugal in 1798; in Holland under the Duke of York in 1799; and afterwards in Nova Scotia, Egypt, and India.

In 1799 Torrens went to Den Helder where he was involved in battles at Hoorne and at Egmond aan Zee: at the latter, he was wounded by a bullet. In 1805 he was promoted to the rank of lieutenant-colonel. After seeing service at Buenos Aires in 1807, he accompanied Sir Arthur Wellesley as military secretary to Portugal in 1808, and was present at the battles of Roliça and Vimeiro.

Torrens rose to be appointed Military Secretary in 1809. He attained the rank of major-general in 1814, and was gazetted K.C.B. and then Adjutant-General to the Forces in 1820.

Torrens died while out riding with his wife and daughters at Welwyn, Hertfordshire on 23 August 1828, aged 48.

== Family ==
In 1803 he married Sarah Patton at St. Helena, the daughter of the Governor of St. Helena, and together they went on to have four sons and two daughters.

Military offices
Preceded by James Gordon	Military Secretary; 1809–1820	Succeeded by Sir Herbert Taylor
Preceded by Sir George Beckwith	Colonel of the 2nd West India Regiment; 1818–1822	Succeeded by Sir John Byng
Preceded by Sir Harry Calvert	Adjutant General; 1820–1828	Succeeded by Sir Herbert Taylor
Preceded by James Coates	Colonel of the 2nd (The Queen's Royal) Regiment of Foot; 1822–1828	Succeeded by Sir James Kempt
