= Michael Brothers =

British politician

Michael Brothers (23 March 1870 – 5 June 1952) was a British politician.

== Life and career ==
Born in Blackburn in Lancashire, Brothers was educated at Blackburn Technical College, where he obtained top marks in the City and Guilds of London Institute examination. He spent some time in Canada, working as a miner, and then building railways, but returned to Blackburn, where he worked as a weaver and a cardroom operative. He joined the Blackburn Cardroom Workers' Amalgamation, and soon became its secretary. In 1927, he visited India to investigate the state of the cotton industry.

The Cardroom Amalgamation was the only major cotton trade union without a member of Parliament, and they sponsored Brothers as a Labour Party candidate in Birmingham Duddeston at the 1922 general election. He was unsuccessful, but pursued his political career with election to Blackburn Borough Council in 1928. He finally won the union a place in Parliament at the 1929 general election, when he was elected in Bolton.

During Brothers' time in Parliament, Indian tariffs against British cotton were greatly increased, but Brothers believed that the Lancashire cotton industry would benefit, as tariffs against rival Japanese cotton were increased by even more. This hope proved incorrect, and the industry in Blackburn suffered most from the new barriers to export. He lost his seat in Parliament at the 1931 general election, and left the council in 1932, but remained involved with Labour as a member of its National Executive Committee, on which he represented the United Textile Factory Workers' Association from 1930 until 1939.

From 1935, Brothers served as a magistrate in Blackburn.

Parliament of the United Kingdom
Preceded by Joseph Cunliffe; Cecil Hilton	Member of Parliament for Bolton; 1929–1931; With: Albert Law	Succeeded by John Haslam; Cyril Entwistle
