= John Haslam (politician) =

British politician (1878-1940)

Sir John Haslam (27 February 1878 – 21 May 1940) was a Conservative Party politician in England. He was the member of parliament (MP) for Bolton from the 1931 general election until his death in 1940, aged 62.

Haslam was knighted in the 1927 Birthday Honours for "political and public services in Lancashire".

Parliament of the United Kingdom
Preceded by Michael Brothers and Albert Law	Member of Parliament for Bolton; 1931–1940; With: Sir Cyril Entwistle	Succeeded by Sir Cyril Entwistle and Sir Edward Cadogan
