= Herbert Cunliffe =

British politician

Sir Joseph Herbert Cunliffe, KBE, QC (1 July 1867 – 9 April 1963) was a British barrister and Conservative Party politician.

Cunliffe was called to the bar in 1896 and took silk in 1912. He was a Member of Parliament (MP) for Bolton, a two-member constituency, from 1923 to 1929.

He was Attorney-General of the Duchy of Lancaster from 1921 to 1946. From 1932 to 1946 he was Chairman of the General Council of the Bar.

He was appointed a knight bachelor in the 1926 New Year Honours List. In 1946 he was appointed KBE.

== Arms ==
Coat of arms of Herbert Cunliffe

Motto
Fideliter Et Celeriter

Parliament of the United Kingdom
Preceded by William Edge; William Russell	Member of Parliament for Bolton; 1923–1929; With: Albert Law 1923–24; Cecil Hilton 1924–29	Succeeded by Michael Brothers; Albert Law
