= Blair Hospital =

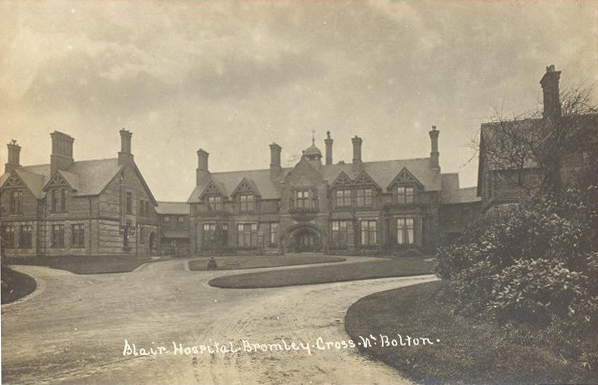
- Blair Hospital

- Shown in Greater Manchester

Geography
- Location: Bolton, Greater Manchester, England
- Coordinates: 53.620°N 2.423°W

Organisation
- Care system: NHS

Services
- Emergency department: No

History
- Founded: 1887

Links
- Lists: Hospitals in England

Blair Hospital was a health facility at Bromley Cross near Bolton, Greater Manchester. It was a very distinctive building, perhaps one of Bolton's really "well-known buildings".

== History ==
The hospital was financed by a legacy from Stephen Blair, a former Member of Parliament. James Knowles, a former Mayor of Bolton, presented the land and the hospital, which was designed by James Medland Taylor, was completed in 1887. The hospital was used by the Red Cross during the First World War. It joined the National Health Service as the Blair Convalescent Hospital in 1948 and closed in 1991. The building was subsequently acquired by an Islamic College and, following demolition of the building, the site was later redeveloped for residential use by Barratt Developments.

== See also ==
- John Hick
