= Little Mitton =

Civil parish in Lancashire, England

Coordinates: 53°50′36″N 2°25′35″W

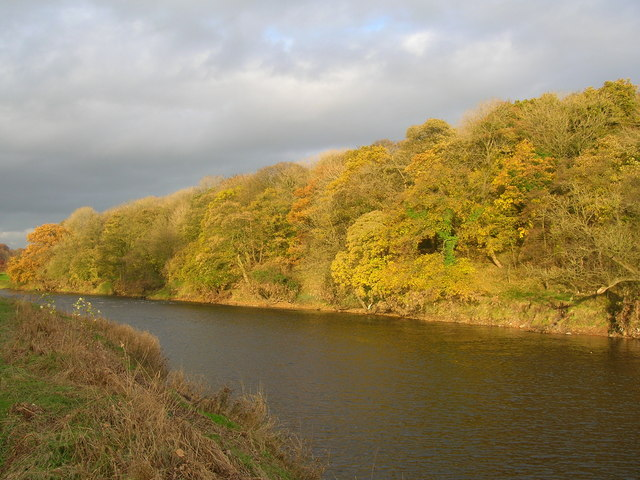
- Mitton Wood and the River Ribble

- Shown within Ribble Valley Location within Lancashire
- Population: 42 (2001 Census)
- Civil parish: Little Mitton
- District: Ribble Valley
- Shire county: Lancashire
- Region: North West
- Country: England
- Sovereign state: United Kingdom
- Post town: CLITHEROE
- Postcode district: BB7
- Dialling code: 01254
- Police: Lancashire
- Fire: Lancashire
- Ambulance: North West
- UK Parliament: Ribble Valley

Little Mitton is a civil parish in the Ribble Valley district, in the county of Lancashire, England. In 2001 the civil parish had a population of 42, but by the time of the census 2011 population details had been absorbed in the civil parish of Great Mitton.

Little Mitton has a grade II* listed house called Mitton Hall also named Mytton Hall, previously known as Little Mitton Hall, former home of John Hick (1874–1894).

== Governance ==
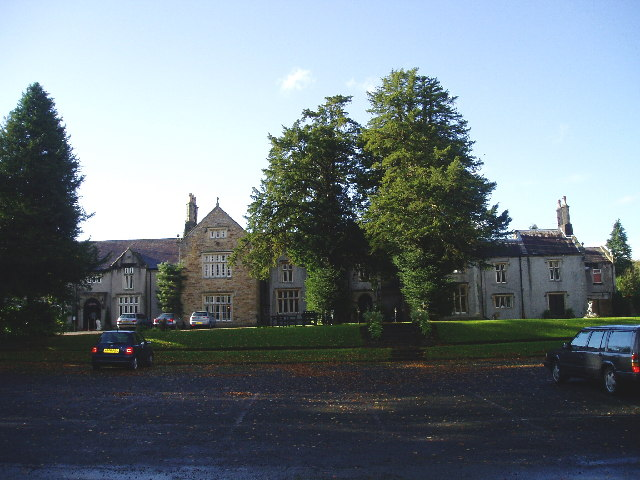
Mitton Hall Country House Hotel, 2005

On 1 April 1935 the civil parish of Little Mitton was created following the abolition the civil parish of Little Mitton, Henthorn and Coldcoats. The detached area of Coldcoats was transferred to Pendleton. That civil parish had been created from the township (in the ancient parish of Whalley) with the same name in 1866.

== See also ==
- Listed buildings in Little Mitton
