= Cecil Hilton =

British politician

Cecil Hilton (1884 – 19 June 1931) was a British Unionist Party politician. He was a Member of Parliament (MP) for Bolton, a two-member constituency, from 1924 to 1929.

Parliament of the United Kingdom
Preceded by Sir Joseph Herbert Cunliffe; Albert Law	Member of Parliament for Bolton; 1924–1929; With: Sir Joseph Herbert Cunliffe	Succeeded by Michael Brothers; Albert Law
