= 1940 Bolton by-election =

UK Parliamentary by-election

The 1940 Bolton by-election was held on 13 September 1940. The by-election was held due to the death of the incumbent Conservative MP, John Haslam. It was won by the Conservative candidate Edward Cadogan, who was unopposed due to the War-time electoral pact.
