= Albert Law =

British politician (1872–1956)

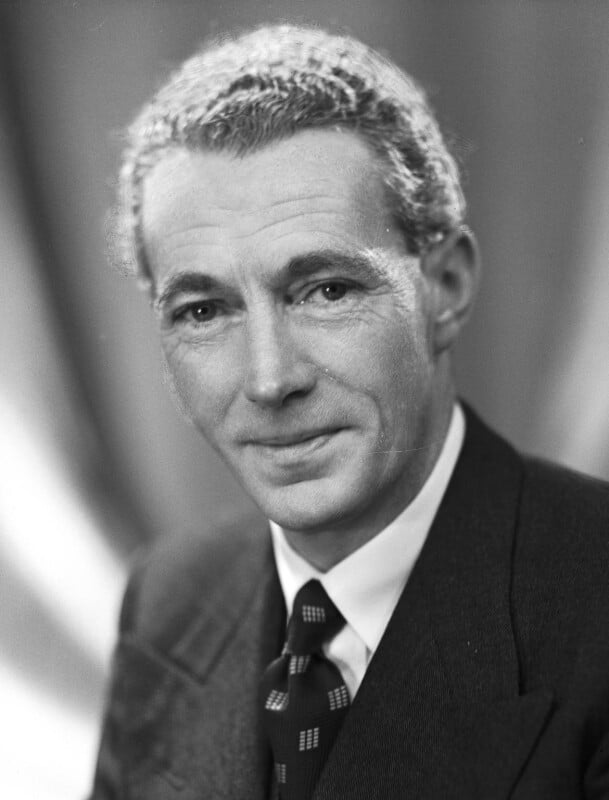
Law in 1950

Albert Law (28 December 1872 – 22 October 1956) was a British Labour Party politician.

Law was born in Bolton, and worked as a cotton spinner in the town. He became active in the Bolton and District Operative Cotton Spinners' Provincial Association, serving as it president from 1916 to 1918 and then again from 1920 to 1922. He was also active in the Labour Party, serving as president of Bolton Trades Council and Labour Party.

He was a Member of Parliament (MP) for Bolton, a two-member constituency, from 1923 to 1924, and again from 1929 to 1931. He stood again in 1935 but was unsuccessful.

Law also served as a Methodist preacher.

Parliament of the United Kingdom
Preceded by William Edge; William Russell	Member of Parliament for Bolton; 1923–1924; With: Sir Joseph Herbert Cunliffe	Succeeded by Sir Joseph Cunliffe; Cecil Hilton
Preceded by Sir Joseph Cunliffe; Cecil Hilton	Member of Parliament for Bolton; 1929–1931; With: Michael Brothers	Succeeded by Sir John Haslam; Sir Cyril Entwistle
