= Robert Torrens (judge) =

Irish judge

Robert Torrens (1775 – 1856) was an Irish judge. He enjoyed, on the whole, a high reputation for impartiality and decency. While his critics called him "the notorious hanging Judge Torrens", the legal profession as a whole praised his legal ability and integrity. Despite increasing complaints about his physical infirmity, he remained on the Bench into extreme old age. Through his daughter Henrietta he was the ancestor of the Barons O'Neill.

== Torrens family ==
He was born in Derry, the third child of the Reverend Thomas Torrens and his wife Elizabeth Curry. The Torrens family were of Swedish origin, and were descended from a Swedish officer who came to Ireland in 1689 in the army of William III of England. They were a numerous family with a tendency to intermarry, so that the Torrens family tree can be difficult to untangle. The judge should not be confused with Robert Torrens, the economist, who was his first cousin. Sir Henry Torrens, the noted military adviser, was the judge's brother; their eldest brother, John, became Archdeacon of Dublin.

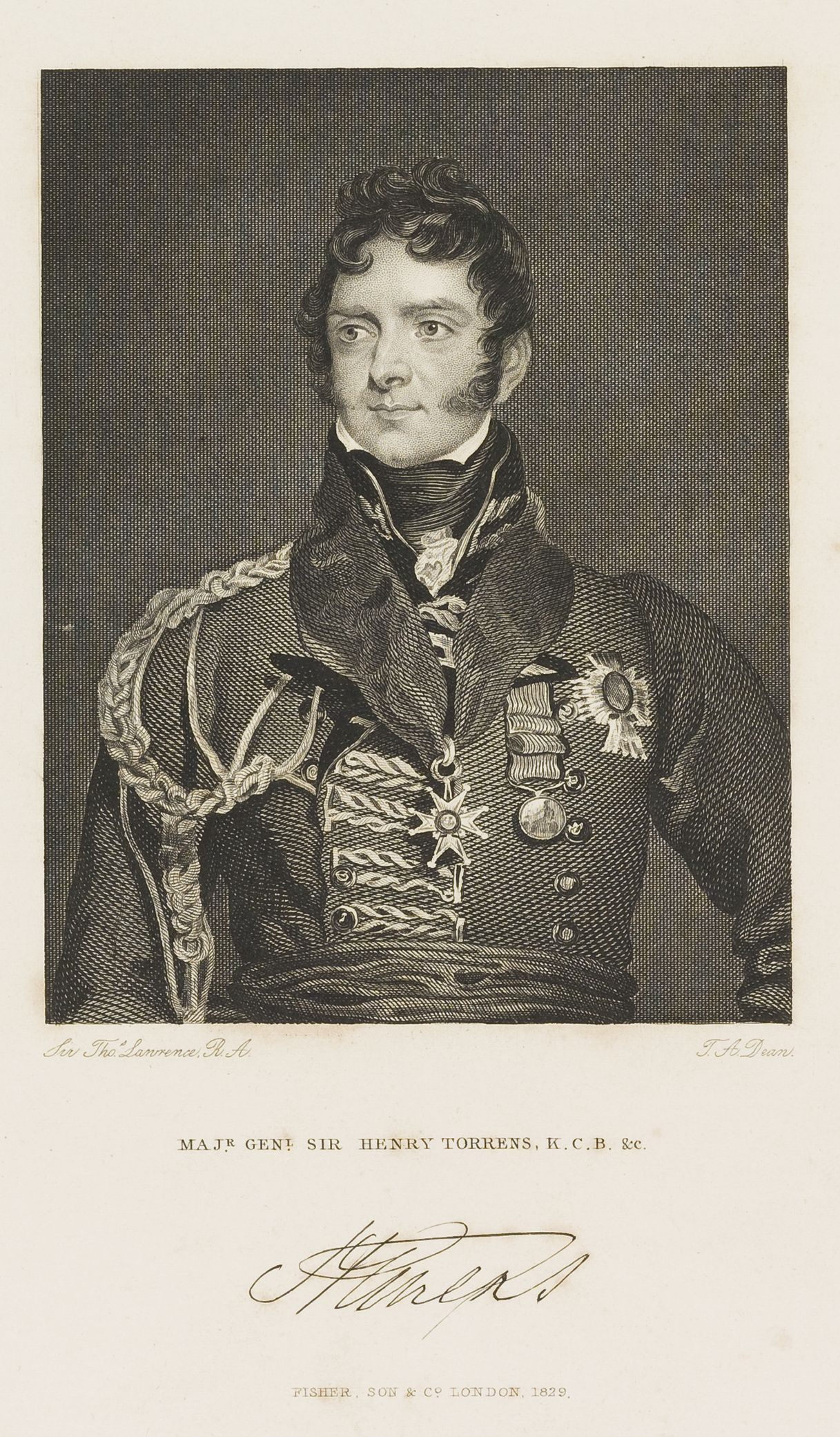
Sir Henry Torrens, the judge's brother

== Early life ==
Both of Robert's parents died when their children were very young, and they were entrusted to the care of relatives. Little is known of Robert Torrens's schooldays. He graduated from Trinity College Dublin in 1795, entered Middle Temple the following year and was called to the Bar in 1798. He became King's Counsel in 1817 and Third Serjeant in 1822.

== Later career ==
In 1822 he was appointed under the Insurrection Act 1822 (3 Geo. 4. c. 1) to be the Commissioner for County Limerick, with the aim of dealing with the serious problem of agrarian violence in that county. He is said to have discharged his duties with great diligence, moderation and humanity, and to have earned the gratitude of the Crown as a result; this, as much as his brother Henry's friendship with the Duke of Wellington, explains his appointment to the Court of Common Pleas in 1823.

As a judge he was well-regarded; even Daniel O'Connell, no friend to the Irish Bench in general, seems to have thought well of him, although on one occasion he gravely embarrassed the judge by suggesting that he had shown bias against a Catholic priest. He was the junior judge at the Doneraile conspiracy trials in 1829 where O'Connell secured the acquittal of most of the accused; both judges, Torrens and Richard Pennefather, have been highly praised for their impartial conduct of the trials.

In 1855-6 Torrens was one of several Irish judges who were threatened with removal from office by the House of Commons as being too old or infirm to fulfil their duties properly. The Irish Bar strongly opposed his removal from office, pleading that although he was eighty years of age, Torrens was an exceptionally conscientious and hard-working judge. Torrens protested strongly at the suggestion that he was unfit for office, but in any event, he died suddenly at his country house, Derrynoid Lodge, just after the spring assizes in 1856.

== Family ==
Like many of the Torrens clan, he married a cousin, in his case, Anne Torrens. They had three sons and two daughters, of whom the best known is Henrietta Torrens (1818-1857) who married William O'Neill, 1st Baron O'Neill and had four children, including Edward O'Neill, 2nd Baron O'Neill and the judge's namesake, Robert Torrens O'Neill.

== Residence ==
He lived mainly at his country house Derrynoid Lodge, Ballinascreen, County Londonderry.

== Grave ==
He is buried in the Torrens family plot at St. Columba's Church of Ireland, Draperstown, County Londonderry.

== Arms ==
Coat of arms of Robert Torrens
Notes Confirmed 26 April 1861 by Sir John Bernard Burke, Ulster King of Arms. Crest A martlet Sable gorged with a collar Or pendent therefrom an escutcheon Ermine charged with a candlestick as in the arms. Escutcheon Per chevron Ermine and Azure three candlesticks Or. Motto Deus Lumen Meum
