= Robert Torrens (economist) =

English economist

Robert Torrens FRS
- Born: 1780; Hervey Hill, Derry, Ireland
- Died: 27 May 1864 (aged 83–84); London
- Occupations: Political economist; politician; Royal Marines officer; publisher; writer
- Notable work: Essay on the production of wealth, 1821
- Family: Robert Richard Torrens (son); Sir Henry Torrens (cousin); Robert Torrens (judge) (cousin)

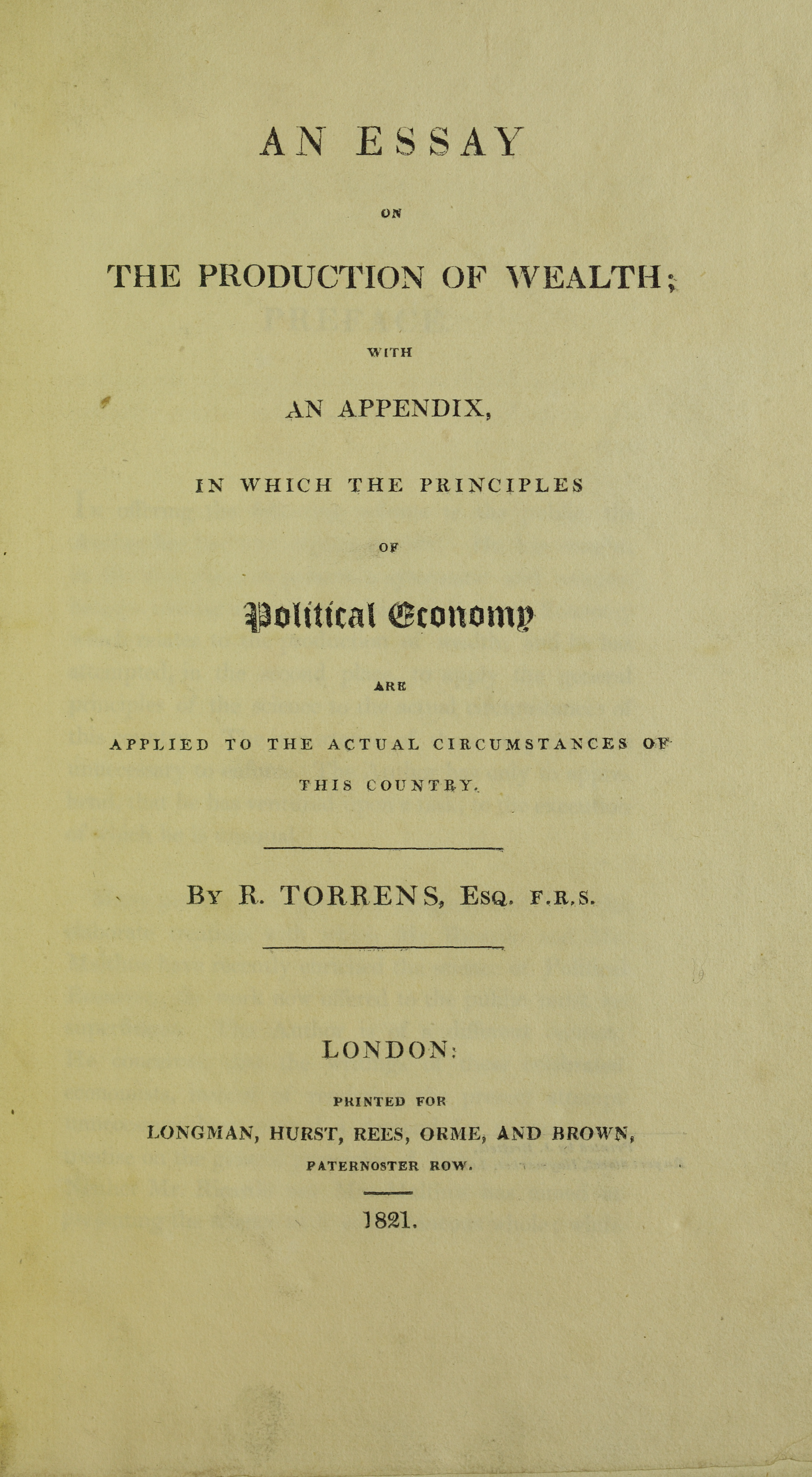
Essay on the production of wealth, 1821

Robert Torrens FRS (1780 – 27 May 1864) was a Royal Marines officer, political economist, part-owner of the influential Globe newspaper, and a prolific writer. He also chaired the board of the London-based South Australian Colonisation Commission created by the South Australia Act 1834 to oversee the new colony of South Australia, before the colony went bankrupt and he was sacked in 1841. He was chiefly known for championing the cause for emigration to the new colony, and his name lives on in Adelaide's main river, the Torrens, the suburb of Torrensville and a few other places.

He is sometimes referred to as Colonel Robert Torrens, but his final army rank is disputed in various sources. His son, Sir Robert Richard Torrens, spent many years in South Australia, even serving for a short time as the state Premier, and became known for his land reform.

== Early life and family ==
Torrens was born in Hervey Hill, Derry, Ireland, the son of Robert Torrens of Hervey Hill and his wife Elizabeth, née Bristow.

The Torrens family, thought to be descended from a Swedish officer in the service of William III of England, were a large and prominent Derry family. Among his numerous cousins were Sir Henry Torrens, the distinguished military adviser, and another Robert Torrens, a judge of the Court of Common Pleas (Ireland).

Torrens married Charity, daughter of Richard Chute of the townland of Roxborough in County Kerry, in 1801 at Dublin. They divorced in 1819, and Torrens went to England. He married Esther Sarah, née Serle, in September 1820.

Torrens' son Robert Richard Torrens, administrator and politician in South Australia, invented the Torrens title system of registering land titles, which is widely used in the British Commonwealth and other states (e.g. Iowa) and countries.

== Military career ==
Torrens entered the Royal Marines in 1796. He achieved renown in 1811 by overseeing the defence of the Baltic island of Anholt against superior Danish forces in the Walcheren Expedition, during which he was severely wounded and was awarded the title of brevet major for his bravery. On the 200th anniversary of the battle of Anholt, the sword presented to Torrens was purchased by the Royal Marines Museum.

After divesting the island in August 1812, the garrison was redeployed to Northern Spain in the winter of 1812 with Major James Malcolm, alongside Spanish forces. Torrens returned to London on 31 August, however, and was ordered to report to Woolwich Divisional Headquarters. Although the Dictionary of National Biography (1885-1900) makes reference to his being "appointed Colonel of a Spanish Legion", this claim has yet to be substantiated by other sources. There is a letter dated 16 January 1813, co-signed by Torrens and Edward Nicolls, requesting that Torrens not be seconded to the Spanish army, but that Nicolls should take his place. The outcome is unclear, but it appears that a Capt. Baillie went instead.

Torrens was subsequently appointed the officer commanding the Marines on HMS Blenheim, and performed this duty from 23 June 1813 to 11 January 1814. His final deployment was off the Low Countries during the winter of 1813–1814, at the siege of Antwerp. He was back in Portsmouth in March 1814.

=== Confusion about rank ===
According to DNB, Torrens was promoted to the rank of Lieutenant-Colonel in 1819, and to that of Colonel in 1837; however, he had retired on half-pay in 1835. According to the provenance of a sword presented to Torrens in an auction catalogue, Torrens saw no further active service but he remained in the Royal Marines until 1834, spending the period 1823–30 on half-pay. This says that the rank of lieutenant-colonel in 1819 was only a brevet, and that he spent 1823 to 1830 on half-pay, being promoted to major in the Marines in 1831 and selling out in 1834.

He is referred to as "Colonel Torrens" in Hansard from November 1826 to August 1832, and in the report of the 1831 parliamentary select committee on steam carriages, on which he sat (published in 1834). He is similarly named in an 1832 piece in Cobbett's Political Register, opposing his policies.

The DNB entry for his son, Sir Robert Richard Torrens, refers to the elder Torrens as "Lieutenant-Colonel".

== Economist ==
Torrens was elected a Fellow of the Royal Society in December 1818.

He was an independent discoverer of the principle of comparative advantage in international trade, which principle is usually attributed to David Ricardo although Torrens wrote about it in 1815, two years before Ricardo's book On the Principles of Political Economy and Taxation was first published. He was a strong advocate of Catholic Emancipation, publishing a tract and a novel on the subject.

Torrens was a founder member of the Political Economy Club. He was also one of the first to theorise about the optimal tariff, predating J. S. Mill's thoughts on the subject by 11 years. His advocacy of reciprocity rather than unconditional free trade in the 1840s was highly controversial, and he was later cited as a precursor by supporters of Joseph Chamberlain's tariff reform campaign.

Torrens was a strong advocate of state-sponsored emigration to relieve population pressure in the United Kingdom (particularly in Ireland; he argued that Irish living standards could only be improved by making Irish agriculture more profitable, but that at the same time this would lead to massive short-term displacement of labourers who must somehow be supported during the transition period).

== South Australia ==
He had earlier been interested in a plan to found a settlement in New Zealand, in 1825 becoming a director of the New Zealand Company, a venture chaired by the wealthy John George Lambton, Whig MP (and later 1st Earl of Durham), that made the first attempt to colonise New Zealand. He was also interested in Thomas Peel's Swan River Colony (1829), but he only became personally involved in actual emigration schemes with the South Australian Land Company in 1831. After the failure of the SALC, he joined the South Australian Association, possibly hopeful of being appointed as Governor of South Australia.

This did not eventuate, but he was appointed chairman of the South Australian Colonization Commission, becoming one of 14 South Australian colonial commissioners, all but one of whom were based in London. This board was set up to oversee the new colony of South Australia, and Torrens put considerable time and energy into writing and lecturing potential emigrants and investors to the colony. However, his financial administration was lacking in almost every respect: he spent money on promotional schemes; ordered costly surveys which disrupted William Light's work of surveying the colony; gave preference to those who professed to have substantial means, but set up no mechanism to check their supposed wealth; and provided free passages in an unregulated way. He made little effort to help George Gawler, who had been appointed Resident Commissioner and Governor after John Hindmarsh's departure, with little financial assistance from England. This mismanagement, along with other factors such as too much immigration too fast leading to unemployment, saw South Australia go bankrupt. Torrens was sacked in 1841 (although at the time, Gawler was made the main scapegoat for the province's woes) and the South Australia Act 1842 brought the colony under the direct rule of the Crown.

== Politics ==
He represented Ipswich, Suffolk as a Whig in the House of Commons in 1826, Ashburton, Devon in 1831 and, as its first MP, the new constituency of Bolton, Lancashire from 1832 to 1835.

== Writer ==
The Annual Register says: "He was an indefatigable writer; the productions of his pen, which include a great variety of tracts on subjects of political economy, some able pamphlets on the currency, and some literary efforts of a lighter class, extend over a period of fifty years. For some time Colonel Torrens was a part proprietor and editor of the Globe newspaper. He was a skilful and lucid writer, and succeeded in throwing considerable light upon some of those abstruse questions connected with monetary science which are the stumbling block of economical students."

== Death and legacy ==
Torrens died 27 May 1864, aged 84, in London. He was survived by his second wife.

He was admired for his treatises on political economy and other political ideas.

Despite his energy and tireless advocacy for the colony of South Australia, Torrens was the man who effectively bankrupted it through his poor administration of its finances, leading to its becoming a Crown Colony in 1842. However, in the 1840s he helped to reform companies which mined copper and built railways in South Australia.

The River Torrens (Kara-wirra-parri), which runs through Adelaide, was named by Governor Hindmarsh in his honour in 1836, and Governor Gawler named the site of the first quarantine station, Torrens Island, in 1837. The explorer Edward Eyre named the large salt lake in the north of the colony Lake Torrens in 1839, and the suburb of Torrensville and the districts of East and West Torrens also commemorated Robert Torrens.

Torrens Park, however, was named after his son, Sir Robert Torrens.

== Works ==
His works number 36 on Allibone's list:

- The Economists Refuted, 1808. ["Economists" in this context refers to supporters of the French Physiocratic theory that agriculture was the only real source of wealth.]
- Celibia Choosing a Husband (1809), a novel
- An Essay on Money and Paper Currency, 1812.
- An Essay on the External Corn Trade. Hatchard. 1815.
- An Essay on the Production of Wealth: With an Appendix, in which the Principles of Political Economy are Applied to the Actual Circumstances of this Country. Longman, Hurst, Rees, Orme, and Brown. 1821.
- Letters on Commercial Policy, 1833.
- On Wages and Combination. Longman, Rees, Orme, Brown, Green, & Longman. 1834.
- The Colonization of South Australia 1835
- The Principles and Practical Operation of Sir Robert Peel's Bill of 1844, 1844.
- Tracts on Finance and Trade, 1852.

== Military promotions and distinctions ==
| Rank | Unit | Date of appointment | Notes |
|---|---|---|---|
| Second Lieutenant | H.M. Marine Forces | 1 February 1796 | |
| Lieutenant | H.M. Marine Forces | 18 November 1797 | |
| Captain | Royal Marines | 26 July 1806 | |
| Brevet Major | Royal Marines | 12 April 1811 | |
| Brevet Lieutenant-Colonel | Royal Marines | 12 August 1819 | On half-pay of the reduced Establishment of the corps 1823–30. |
| Major | Royal Marines | 4 June 1831 | |

== Notes ==
Parliament of the United Kingdom
| Preceded by Thomas Barrett-Lennard; William Haldimand | Member of Parliament for Ipswich; 1826–1827; With: William Haldimand | Succeeded by Charles Mackinnon; Robert Adam Dundas |
| Preceded by Sir Lawrence Palk; William Stephen Poyntz | Member of Parliament for Ashburton; 1831–1832; With: William Stephen Poyntz | Succeeded by William Stephen Poyntz; Second seat abolished |
| New constituency | Member of Parliament for Bolton; 1832–1835; With: William Bolling | Succeeded by William Bolling; Peter Ainsworth |
