= John Pennington Thomasson =

British politician

Thomasson in 1880

John Pennington Thomasson (19 May 1841, in Bolton – 16 May 1904, in Heaton, Greater Manchester) was an English cotton spinner and Liberal Party politician. He was elected as a Member of Parliament (MP) for Bolton at the 1880 general election along with John Kynaston Cross in the double member constituency, signifying a great victory as two liberals were elected for the first time since 1852. He served for 5 years, when he lost his seat owing to the Home Rule split. He became a Liberal Unionist, although he returned to the Liberal fold eventually.

== Biography ==
Born on 19 May 1841, third child of Thomas Thomasson and Maria Pennington, he was born into a well known family of Bolton Quakers. In about 1862, he entered the cotton spinning firm founded by his grandfather at Mill Hill, in the Haulgh, Bolton, where he helped run the business of four cotton mills, with great success until 1871, when the partnership was dissolved and he continued with No. 3 mill under the old name of John Thomasson and Son.

In 1867 he married Katharine Lucas, a niece of John Bright, and daughter of Margaret Bright Lucas. They lived at Alderley Edge, Cheshire, and had three children, Lucas (1868), Beatrice (1870) and Franklin Thomasson (1873).

He was, like his father, an advanced Liberal. In 1873 he was invited to contest the Bolton constituency, but declined.

When his son Franklin was born in 1873 he lived at Alderley Edge. In 1875, when living in that place he wrote a letter to Charles Darwin, concerning the nests of the spotted flycatcher (then called common flycatcher – Muscicapa grisola) and the pied flycatcher (then called M. luctuosa).

He followed his father in many public benefactions. By 1876 he had given 100 scholarships to the value of £25 each for three years. In 1881 he financed the building of the Haulgh Board School, gave £1,000 towards the founding of the Chadwick Museum, and built the Folds Road gymnasium. In all it is calculated that he gave over £30,000 to the cause of education in the borough. In 1890 he gave Mere Hall, formerly the residence of Sir Benjamin Dobson, to the town as a public park, together with £5,000 towards alterations. This became the original Bolton Art Gallery.

As a memorial of his work and in recognition of his services to the borough, the Thomasson Memorial School was erected on Devonshire Road. The school, for blind and deaf children was approved in February 1907.

He was made a freeman of the borough in 1902. He died at Heaton, Greater Manchester on 16 May 1904 aged 62.

He was a Unitarian, and a keen supporter of Bank Street Chapel, and his enlightened outlook is proved by the fact that he was an early supporter of the Women's suffrage movement.

Parliament of the United Kingdom
Preceded by John Kynaston Cross; John Hick	Member of Parliament for Bolton; 1880–1885; With: John Kynaston Cross 1880–1885	Succeeded by Herbert Shepherd-Cross; Francis Bridgeman
