= William Gray (Conservative politician) =

English politician

William Gray (21 December 1814 – 6 February 1895) was an English Conservative Party politician who sat in the House of Commons from 1857 to 1874.

Gray was the second son of William Gray of Wheatfield, in the Haulgh, Bolton, and his wife Frances Rasbotham, daughter of Dorning Rasbotham of Birch House, near Bolton. He was educated privately and in 1835 was cornet in the Duke of Lancaster's Own Yeomanry Cavalry. He was captain in the 4th Royal Lancashire Militia, and Lieutenant-Colonel of the 27th Lancashire Rifle Volunteers.

He owned the Lever Bridge cotton mill in Darcy Lever which in 1891 had 21,000 spindles and 420 looms. From 1850 to 1852, Gray was Mayor of Bolton. He was a deputy lieutenant and J.P. for Lancashire.

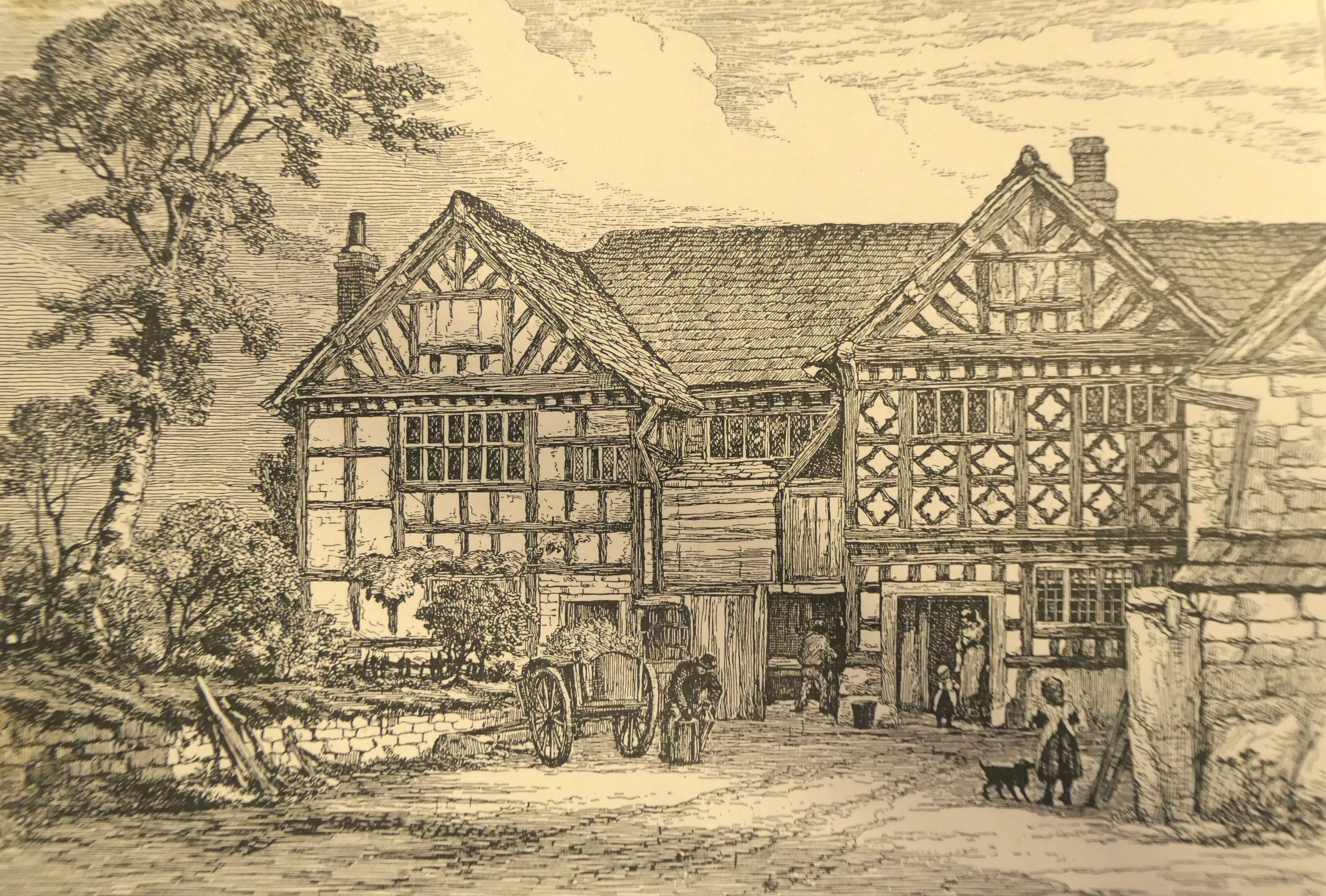
Darcy Lever Hall, c.1892

At the 1857 general election Gray was elected as a member of parliament (MP) for Bolton. He held the seat until he was defeated at the 1874 general election. He was a liberal Conservative and was in favour of education based on religion.

Gray lived at Darcy Lever Hall, near Bolton, in Lancashire (now Greater Manchester) and Farley Hill Place in Berkshire. He was High Sheriff of Berkshire for 1882–83.

He died aged 80. Gray married Magdalene Robin, daughter of John Robin of West Kirby Cheshire, in 1861.

Parliament of the United Kingdom
Preceded by Thomas Barnes; Joseph Crook	Member of Parliament for Bolton; 1857 – 1874; With: Joseph Crook to 1861; Thomas Barnes 1861–1868; John Hick from 1868	Succeeded by John Kynaston Cross; John Hick
