= Listed buildings in Little Mitton =

Little Mitton is a civil parish in Ribble Valley, Lancashire, England. It contains two listed buildings that are recorded in the National Heritage List for England. Of these, one is at Grade II*, the middle grade, and the other is at Grade II, the lowest grade. The listed buildings are a former country house, later converted into a hotel, and a bridge crossing the River Ribble.

== Key ==
Grade	Criteria
II*	Particularly important buildings of more than special interest
II	Buildings of national importance and special interest

== Buildings ==
Name and location	Photograph	Date	Notes	Grade
Mitton Hall; 53.84212°N 2.43180°W		c. 1500	Originally a timber-framed country house, it was encased in sandstone and remodelled in 1844. There was further remodelling in about 1875–80, and the house has since been converted into a hotel. The building is partly pebbledashed with a slate roof. It has two storeys with attics, and an H-shaped plan, consisting of a hall and cross wings. The windows are mullioned or mullioned and transomed. On the front of the hall are two gabled projections, the right one being a two-storey porch that has a doorway with a moulded semicircular arch and moulded imposts. There are finials on the gables. Inside, the hall has an open roof of six bays.	II*
Mitton Bridge; 53.84401°N 2.43347°W		Early 19th century (probable)	The bridge carries the B6246 road over the River Ribble. It is in sandstone, and consists of three segmental arches with rounded cutwaters. The bridge has a solid parapet, a string course, and weathered coping. There is an inscription on the southern parapet.	II
