= Thomas Thomasson =

Thomas Thomasson (1808 – 1876) was a political economist and a campaigner for the repeal of the Corn Laws who was one of Bolton's greatest benefactors.

== Life ==
Thomasson was born at Turton into a Bolton family and was grandson of one of the original cotton pioneers. He joined his father in the family business of John Thomasson and Son at Mill Hill, a cotton mill founded by Sir Robert Peel. In 1837 his father died and Thomasson took on the management of the firm. In 1841 he built the first of three new Mill Hill factories, a bold venture, as the mill was said to be huge, and the cotton industry was then in depression – a fact which was mentioned by the Prime Minister (Sir Robert Peel) in the House of Commons as evidence that persons did not hesitate to employ their capital in the further extension of the cotton trade, notwithstanding its condition. The firm built on this success, opening another new factory in 1853, and a third in 1859.

Thomasson was intimately associated with Richard Cobden in the repeal of the Corn Laws and was a good friend of John Bright who attended his funeral and bore testimony to his remarkable capacity as a man of business, saying, "He will be greatly missed by many who have been accustomed to apply to him for advice and help.". On an occasion in the Bolton Theatre, when the Corn Law question was contested, he may be said to have called Abraham Walter Paulton into public life, by sending him on to the platform to defend the cause of repeal. Mr. Paulton became the first effective platform advocate of that movement. Thomasson was the chief promoter of the Anti-Corn Law agitation, and the greatest subscriber to its funds. When the great subscription was raised in 1845, he was the first to put down £1,000. When it was proposed to make some national gift to Richard Cobden, Thomasson gave £5,000. He subsequently gave £5,000 to the second Cobden subscription.

Thomass helped secure the incorporation of Bolton by money, counsel, and personal exertions. He joined the first Council considering it his duty to take part in promoting the improvements he had advocated, and was at the head of the poll,. He remained a member of the Council over eighteen years. Thomasson's indignation had been greatly excited under the old government when it was usual to call out armed police, or the military, for comparatively trifling disturbances.

Thomasson was a vigorous advocate for the town being supplied with cheap gas and cheap water, which involved watchfulness and advocacy extending over several years. He was foremost in insisting on the sanitary improvements of the town, and that the inspector should proceed against those who suffered nuisances on their premises. He gave the instance of "a family living in a cellar, outside of which there was a cesspool, the contents of which oozed through the walls and collected under the bed." £300 being left towards the formation of an industrial school, Thomasson gave £200 more that it might be put into operation. On one occasion, when he was much opposed to the views of the Council, he resigned rather than frustrate a compromise in which he could not concur, but which others thought beneficial.

He promoted petitions in favour of Decimal Coinage, and refused to join in a petition against the Income Tax, deeming direct taxation the best. For some time he was a member of the Board of Guardians, but resigned because he "could not sit and see men slaughtered by a stroke of the pen," alluding to what he considered the illiberal manner in which relief was dispensed.

He promoted the establishment of a library and museum, and gave £100 towards establishing a school on the plan of the British and Foreign Bible Society. When new premises were required for a Mechanics' Institution, he gave £500 towards that project. He subscribed fifty guineas towards a memorial statue of Samuel Crompton, the inventor, and proposed that something should be given to his descendants, saying: "If Crompton had been a great general and had killed thousands of people, the Government would have provided him with a small county, and given him a peerage; but as he had given livelihood to thousands of mule spinners, it was left to the people to provide for his distressed descendants." The town would have given Thomasson any office in its power, but he refused to be Alderman, Mayor, or Member of Parliament. He declined testimonials or statue. He sought no distinction for himself and accepted none; he cared alone for the welfare of the nation and the town, and the working people in it.

At a time when the votes of work people were generally regarded as the property of employers, Thomasson said: "If the men in his employ were Tories and voted so " — which meant voting for the Corn Laws, to which he was most opposed—" they would remain perfectly undisturbed by him — their public opinion and conduct were free." He was distinguished beyond any Quaker of his day for political sympathy and tolerance. His principle was "to extend to every man, rich or poor, whatever privilege, political or mental, he claimed for himself."

John Morley relates, in his "Life of Cobden," that Thomasson, learning that Cobden was embarrassed by outstanding loans, raised to pay for his Illinois shares, amounting to several thousand pounds, Thomasson released the shares, and sent them to Cobden, with a request that "he would do him the favour to accept that freedom at his hands in acknowledgment of his vast services to his country and mankind." On a later occasion, when aid was needed, Mr. Thomasson went down to Midhurst and insisted that Cobden should accept a still larger sum, refusing a formal acknowledgment and handing it over in such a form that the transaction was not known to any one but Cobden and himself. After Mr. Thomasson's death there was found among his private papers a little memorandum of these advances containing the magnanimous words: "I lament that the greatest benefactor of mankind since the invention of printing was placed in a position where his public usefulness was compromised and impeded by sordid personal cares, but I have done something as my share of what is due to him from his countrymen to set him free for further efforts in the cause of human progress."

In the repeal of the Corn Laws he always had in mind the welfare of his own townsmen, who, he said, "were paying in 1841 £150,000 more for food than they did in 1835," and every town in the country in a similar proportion. He constantly sought opportunities of generosity which could never be requited, nor even acknowledged, as he left no clue to the giver. When in London, he would, two or three years in succession, call in Fleet Street at a publishing house – then aiding in the repeal of the taxes on knowledge and defending the freedom of reasoned opinion — and leave £10, bearing the simple inscription, "From T.T." Several years elapsed before it was known whose name the initials represented. All this was so unlike the popular conception of a political economist, that such incidents deserve to be recorded. Workmen whose views he did not share would invite lecturers to the town, whom he would sometimes entertain, and judging that their remuneration would be scant, he would add £5 on their departure to cover their expenses. Thinking that Thomas Huxley might need rest which his means might not allow, Thomasson offered to defray the cost of six months' travel abroad with his family. It was not convenient to the Professor to act upon the offer. At Thomasson's death a note was found among his papers, saying, "Send Huxley £1,000," which his son, afterwards member for Bolton, did in his father's name.

Though brought up a member of the Society of Friends, Thomasson later attended the Bolton Parish Church, his wife being a Church woman. In 1855 he heard the clergyman preach on the propriety of the Crimean War, which he thought so un-Christian that he never went to church again.

== Family ==
In 1834 Thomasson married Maria Pennington, sister of Frederick Pennington and daughter of a John Pennington a cotton spinner of Hindley. Thomasson and Maria lived at High Bank, Haulgh, their four children included John Pennington Thomasson (1841) and a daughter Emma who married Stephen Winkworth, the younger brother of Susanna and Catherine Winkworth. Emma was, in 1863, the first woman to ascend the Jungfrau she also made the first female ascent of the Aletschhorn and the Alphubel.
