= Bolton (constituency) =

Parliamentary constituency in the United Kingdom, 1832–1950

- Former borough constituency for the House of Commons

1832–1950
- Seats: two
- Created from: Lancashire
- Replaced by: Bolton East and Bolton West

Bolton was a borough constituency centred on the town of Bolton in the county of Lancashire. It returned two Members of Parliament (MPs) to the House of Commons for the Parliament of the United Kingdom, elected by the bloc vote system.

Created by the Reform Act 1832, it was represented by two Members of Parliament. The constituency was abolished in 1950, being split into single-member divisions of Bolton East and Bolton West.

== Members of Parliament ==
Election	1st member	1st party	2nd member	2nd party
1832	Robert Torrens	Whig	William Bolling	Tory
1834	Robert Torrens	Whig	William Bolling	Conservative
1835	Peter Ainsworth	Whig	William Bolling	Conservative
1837	Peter Ainsworth	Whig	William Bolling	Conservative
1841	Peter Ainsworth	Whig	John Bowring	Radical
1847	William Bolling	Conservative	John Bowring	Radical
1848 by-election	Stephen Blair	Conservative	John Bowring	Radical
1849 by-election	Stephen Blair	Conservative	Sir Joshua Walmsley	Radicals
1852	Thomas Barnes	Radical	Joseph Crook	Radical
1857	William Gray	Conservative	Joseph Crook	Radical
1859	William Gray	Conservative	Joseph Crook	Liberal
1861 by-election	William Gray	Conservative	Thomas Barnes	Liberal
1865	William Gray	Conservative	Thomas Barnes	Liberal
1868	William Gray	Conservative	John Hick	Conservative
1874	John Kynaston Cross	Liberal	John Hick	Conservative
1880	John Kynaston Cross	Liberal	John Pennington Thomasson	Liberal
1885	Herbert Shepherd-Cross	Unionist	Francis Bridgeman	Unionist
1886	Herbert Shepherd-Cross	Unionist	Francis Bridgeman	Unionist
1892	Herbert Shepherd-Cross	Unionist	Francis Bridgeman	Unionist
1895	Herbert Shepherd-Cross	Conservative	George Harwood	Liberal
1900	Herbert Shepherd-Cross	Conservative	George Harwood	Liberal
1906	Alfred Henry Gill	Labour	George Harwood	Liberal
Jan 1910	Alfred Henry Gill	Labour	George Harwood	Liberal
Dec 1910	Alfred Henry Gill	Labour	George Harwood	Liberal
1912 by-election	Alfred Henry Gill	Labour	Thomas Taylor	Liberal
1914 by-election	Robert Tootill	Labour	Thomas Taylor	Liberal
1916 by-election	Robert Tootill	Labour	William Edge	Liberal
Dec 1916	Robert Tootill	Labour	William Edge	Coalition Liberal
1922	William Russell	Conservative	William Edge	National Liberal
1923	Sir Herbert Cunliffe	Conservative	Albert Law	Labour
1924	Sir Herbert Cunliffe	Conservative	Cecil Hilton	Unionist
1929	Michael Brothers	Labour	Albert Law	Labour
1931	Sir John Haslam	Conservative	Sir Cyril Entwistle	Conservative
1935	Sir John Haslam	Conservative	Sir Cyril Entwistle	Conservative
1940 by-election	Sir Edward Cadogan	Conservative	Sir Cyril Entwistle	Conservative
1945	John Henry Jones	Labour	John Lewis	Labour
1950	constituency abolished: see Bolton East & Bolton West			

== Boundaries ==
1832–1885: The township of Great Bolton, Little Bolton, and Haulgh, except the detached part of the township of Little Bolton which was situate to the north of the town of Bolton.

1885–1918: The existing parliamentary borough, and so much of the municipal borough of Bolton as was not already included in the parliamentary borough.

== Elections ==
1840s – 1850s – 1860s – 1870s – 1880s – 1890s – 1900s – 1910s – 1920s – 1930s – 1940s – References

Winning candidates are highlighted in bold.

=== Elections in the 1830s ===
General election 1832: Bolton (2 seats)
Party	Candidate	Votes	%
**Whig**	**Robert Torrens**	**627**	**36.7**
**Tory**	**William Bolling**	**492**	**28.8**
Whig	John Ashton Yates	482	28.2
Radical	William Eagle	107	6.3
Turnout		935	89.9
Registered electors		1,040	
Majority		135	7.9
Whig **win** (new seat)			
Majority		10	0.6
Tory **win** (new seat)			

General election 1835: Bolton (2 seats)
Party	Candidate	Votes	%	±%
**Conservative**	**William Bolling**	**633**	**40.4**	**+11.6**
**Whig**	**Peter Ainsworth**	**590**	**37.7**	**+9.5**
Whig	Robert Torrens	343	21.9	−14.8
Majority		43	2.7	+2.1
Turnout		927	92.6	+2.7
Registered electors		1,001		
Conservative **hold**		Swing	+7.1	
Whig **hold**		Swing	+6.2	

General election 1837: Bolton (2 seats)
Party	Candidate	Votes	%	±%
**Whig**	**Peter Ainsworth**	**615**	**34.9**	**−2.8**
**Conservative**	**William Bolling**	**607**	**34.5**	**−5.9**
Whig	Andrew Knowles	538	30.6	+8.7
Turnout		1,079	80.5	−12.1
Registered electors		1,340		
Majority		8	0.4	
Whig **hold**		Swing	+0.1	
Majority		69	3.9	+1.2
Conservative **hold**		Swing	−5.9	

=== Elections in the 1840s ===
General election 1841: Bolton (2 seats)
Party	Candidate	Votes	%	±%
**Whig**	**Peter Ainsworth**	**669**	**29.6**	**−35.9**
**Radical**	**John Bowring**	**614**	**27.2**	**N/A**
Conservative	Peter Rothwell	536	23.7	+6.5
Conservative	William Bolling	441	19.5	+2.3
Turnout		1,164	79.1	−1.4
Registered electors		1,471		
Majority		55	2.4	+2.0
Whig **hold**		Swing	−19.7	
Majority		173	7.7	N/A
Radical **gain** from Conservative		Swing		

General election 1847: Bolton (2 seats)
Party	Candidate	Votes	%	±%
**Conservative**	**William Bolling**	**714**	**35.5**	**−7.7**
**Radical**	**John Bowring**	**652**	**32.4**	**+5.2**
Radical	John Brooks	645	32.1	N/A
Majority		69	3.4	N/A
Turnout		1,363 (est)	92.1 (est)	+13.0
Registered electors		1,479		
Conservative **gain** from Whig		Swing	−6.5	
Radical **hold**		Swing	+4.5	

Bolling's death caused a by-election.

By-election, 12 September 1848: Bolton
Party	Candidate	Votes	%	±%
**Conservative**	**Stephen Blair**	**Unopposed**		
Conservative **hold**				

Bowring resigned after being appointed Consul-General at Canton, China, causing a by-election.

By-election, 9 February 1849: Bolton
Party	Candidate	Votes	%	±%
**Radical**	**Joshua Walmsley**	**621**	**52.2**	**−12.3**
Conservative	Thomas Ridgway Bridson	568	47.8	+12.3
Majority		53	4.4	N/A
Turnout		1,189	82.7	−9.4
Registered electors		1,437		
Radical **hold**		Swing	−12.3	

Back to Elections

=== Elections in the 1850s ===
General election 1852: Bolton (2 seats)
Party	Candidate	Votes	%	±%
**Radical**	**Thomas Barnes**	**745**	**29.4**	**−3.0**
**Radical**	**Joseph Crook**	**727**	**28.7**	**−3.4**
Conservative	Stephen Blair	717	28.3	−7.2
Whig	Peter Ainsworth	346	13.6	N/A
Majority		10	0.4	N/A
Turnout		1,268 (est)	75.9 (est)	−16.2
Registered electors		1,671		
Radical **hold**		Swing	+0.3	
Radical **gain** from Conservative		Swing	+0.1	

General election 1857: Bolton (2 seats)
Party	Candidate	Votes	%	±%
**Conservative**	**William Gray**	**930**	**35.0**	**+6.7**
**Radical**	**Joseph Crook**	**895**	**33.7**	**+5.0**
Radical	Thomas Barnes	832	31.3	+1.9
Majority		98	3.7	N/A
Turnout		1,794 (est)	92.8 (est)	+16.9
Registered electors		1,933		
Conservative **gain** from Radical		Swing	+1.6	
Radical **hold**		Swing	+0.8	

General election 1859: Bolton (2 seats)
Party	Candidate	Votes	%	±%
**Conservative**	**William Gray**	**Unopposed**		
**Liberal**	**Joseph Crook**	**Unopposed**		
Registered electors		2,050		
Conservative **hold**				
Liberal **hold**				

Back to Elections

=== Elections in the 1860s ===
Crook's resignation caused a by-election.

By-election, 11 Feb 1861: Bolton (1 seat)
Party	Candidate	Votes	%	±%
**Liberal**	**Thomas Barnes**	**Unopposed**		
Liberal **hold**				

General election 1865: Bolton (2 seats)
Party	Candidate	Votes	%	±%
**Conservative**	**William Gray**	**1,022**	**28.5**	**N/A**
**Liberal**	**Thomas Barnes**	**979**	**27.3**	**N/A**
Liberal	Samuel Pope	864	24.1	N/A
Liberal-Conservative	William Gibb	727	20.2	New
Turnout		1,796 (est)	82.2 (est)	N/A
Registered electors		2,186		
Majority		43	1.2	N/A
Conservative **hold**		Swing	N/A	
Majority		252	7.1	N/A
Liberal **hold**		Swing	N/A	

General election 1868: Bolton (2 seats)
Party	Candidate	Votes	%	±%
**Conservative**	**John Hick**	**6,062**	**26.6**	**+12.3**
**Conservative**	**William Gray**	**5,848**	**25.7**	**+11.4**
Liberal	Thomas Barnes	5,451	23.9	−3.4
Liberal	Samuel Pope	5,436	23.8	−0.3
Majority		611	2.7	N/A
Turnout		11,399 (est)	90.1 (est)	+7.9
Registered electors		12,650		
Conservative **hold**		Swing	+6.3	
Conservative **gain** from Liberal		Swing	+7.4	

Back to Elections

=== Elections in the 1870s ===
General election 1874: Bolton (2 seats)
Party	Candidate	Votes	%	±%
**Conservative**	**John Hick**	**5,987**	**26.2**	**−0.4**
**Liberal**	**John Kynaston Cross**	**5,782**	**25.3**	**+1.4**
Conservative	William Gray	5,650	24.7	−1.0
Liberal	James Knowles	5,440	23.8	0.0
Turnout		11,430 (est)	90.7 (est)	+0.6
Registered electors		12,595		
Majority		205	0.9	−1.8
Conservative **hold**		Swing	−0.2	
Majority		132	0.6	N/A
Liberal **gain** from Conservative		Swing	+1.2	

Back to Elections

=== Elections in the 1880s ===
General election 1880: Bolton (2 seats)
Party	Candidate	Votes	%	±%
**Liberal**	**John Kynaston Cross**	**6,964**	**26.2**	**+0.9**
**Liberal**	**John Pennington Thomasson**	**6,673**	**25.1**	**+1.3**
Conservative	Thomas Lever Rushton	6,540	24.6	−1.6
Conservative	Francis Bridgeman	6,415	24.1	−0.6
Majority		133	0.5	N/A
Turnout		13,296 (est)	95.3 (est)	+4.6
Registered electors		13,956		
Liberal **gain** from Conservative		Swing	+1.3	
Liberal **hold**		Swing	+1.0	

Cross

Thomasson

General election 1885: Bolton (2 seats)
Party	Candidate	Votes	%	±%
**Conservative**	**Herbert Shepherd-Cross**	**7,933**	**26.6**	**+2.0**
**Conservative**	**Francis Bridgeman**	**7,655**	**25.8**	**+1.7**
Liberal	John Kynaston Cross	6,725	22.6	−3.6
Liberal	John Pennington Thomasson	6,228	21.0	−4.1
Ind. Conservative	Henry Marriott Richardson	1,191	4.0	New
Majority		1,705	5.6	N/A
Majority		930	3.2	N/A
Turnout		15,069	93.8	−1.5 (est)
Registered electors		16,063		
Conservative **gain** from Liberal		Swing	+2.8	
Conservative **gain** from Liberal		Swing	+2.9	

General election 1886: Bolton (2 seats)
Party	Candidate	Votes	%	±%
**Conservative**	**Herbert Shepherd-Cross**	**7,780**	**27.5**	**+0.9**
**Conservative**	**Francis Bridgeman**	**7,668**	**27.2**	**+1.4**
Liberal	Joseph Crook Haslam	6,452	22.9	+0.3
Liberal	Roger Charnock Richards	6,314	22.4	+1.4
Majority		1,216	4.3	+1.1
Turnout		14,167	88.2	−5.6
Registered electors		16,063		
Conservative **hold**		Swing	+0.3	
Conservative **hold**		Swing	+0.0	

Back to Elections

=== Elections in the 1890s ===
Shepherd-Cross

General election 1892: Bolton (2 seats)
Party	Candidate	Votes	%	±%
**Conservative**	**Herbert Shepherd-Cross**	**8,429**	**26.6**	**−0.9**
**Conservative**	**Francis Bridgeman**	**8,140**	**25.7**	**−1.5**
Liberal	Frank Taylor	7,575	23.9	+1.0
Liberal	John Harwood	7,536	23.8	+1.4
Majority		565	1.8	−2.5
Turnout		31,680	89.6	+1.4
Registered electors		17,772		
Conservative **hold**		Swing	-1.0	
Conservative **hold**		Swing	-1.3	

Harwood

General election 1895: Bolton (2 seats)
Party	Candidate	Votes	%	±%
**Conservative**	**Herbert Shepherd-Cross**	**8,594**	**31.0**	**+4.4**
**Liberal**	**George Harwood**	**8,453**	**30.6**	**+6.7**
Conservative	Francis Bridgeman	7,901	28.6	+2.9
Ind. Labour Party	Frederick Brocklehurst	2,694	9.8	N/A
Turnout		27,642	92.1	+2.5
Registered electors		18,183		
Majority		5,900	21.2	+19.4
Conservative **hold**		Swing	−1.2	
Majority		552	2.0	N/A
Liberal **gain** from Conservative		Swing	+1.9	

Back to Elections

=== Elections in the 1900s ===
General election 1900: Bolton (2 seats)
Party	Candidate	Votes	%	±%
**Conservative**	**Herbert Shepherd-Cross**	**Unopposed**		
**Liberal**	**George Harwood**	**Unopposed**		
Conservative **hold**				
Liberal **hold**				

Goschen

General election 1906: Bolton (2 seats)
Party	Candidate	Votes	%	±%
**Liberal**	**George Harwood**	**10,953**	**39.0**	**N/A**
**Labour Repr. Cmte.**	**Alfred Henry Gill**	**10,416**	**37.1**	**New**
Conservative	George Goschen	6,693	23.9	N/A
Majority		3,723	13.2	N/A
Turnout		28,062	91.5	N/A
Registered electors		20,388		
Liberal **hold**				
Labour Repr. Cmte. **gain** from Conservative				

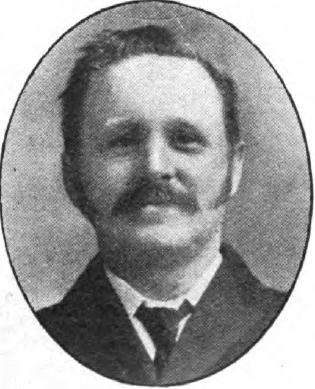
Gill

Back to Elections

=== Elections in the 1910s ===
General election January 1910: Bolton (2 seats)
Party	Candidate	Votes	%	±%
**Liberal**	**George Harwood**	**12,275**	**31.5**	**−7.5**
**Labour**	**Alfred Henry Gill**	**11,864**	**30.5**	**−6.6**
Conservative	Miles Walker Mattinson	7,479	19.2	−4.7
Conservative	Percy Ashworth	7,326	18.8	N/A
Turnout		38,944	93.8	+2.3
Registered electors		21,341		
Majority		4,796	12.3	−2.8
Liberal **hold**		Swing	−0.5	
Majority		4,385	11.3	−1.9
Labour **hold**		Swing	−1.0	

General election December 1910: Bolton (2 seats)
Party	Candidate	Votes	%	±%
**Liberal**	**George Harwood**	**10,358**	**35.5**	**+4.0**
**Labour**	**Alfred Henry Gill**	**10,108**	**34.7**	**+4.2**
Conservative	George Hesketh (soldier)	8,697	29.8	−8.2
Turnout		29,163	89.3	−4.5
Registered electors		21,341		
Majority		1,661	5.7	−6.6
Liberal **hold**		Swing	+6.1	
Majority		1,411	4.9	−6.4
Labour **hold**		Swing	+6.2	

Harwood's death causes a by-election.

1912 Bolton by-election (1 seat)
Party	Candidate	Votes	%	±%
**Liberal**	**Thomas Taylor**	**10,011**	**53.1**	**+17.6**
Unionist	Arthur Brooks	8,835	46.9	+17.1
Majority		1,176	6.2	N/A
Turnout		18,846	88.9	−0.4
Registered electors		21,195		
Liberal **hold**		Swing	N/A	

Gill's death caused a by-election.

1914 Bolton by-election (1 seat)
Party	Candidate	Votes	%	±%
**Labour**	**Robert Tootill**	**Unopposed**		
Labour **hold**				

Taylor's resignation causes a by-election.

1916 Bolton by-election (1 seat)
Party	Candidate	Votes	%	±%
**Liberal**	**William Edge**	**Unopposed**		
Liberal **hold**				

General Election 1914–15:

Another General Election was required to take place before the end of 1915. The political parties had been making preparations for an election to take place and by July 1914, the following candidates had been selected;

- Liberal: Thomas Taylor
- Labour: Robert Tootill
- Unionist: Thomas Clarke Pilling Gibbons

General election 1918: Bolton (2 seats)
Party		Candidate	Votes	%	±%
**C**	**National Liberal**	**William Edge**	**Unopposed**		
	**Labour**	**Robert Tootill**	**Unopposed**		
	National Liberal **hold**				
	Labour **hold**				
**C** indicates candidate endorsed by the coalition government.

Back to Elections

=== Elections in the 1920s ===
General election 1922: Bolton (2 seats)
Party	Candidate	Votes	%	±%
**Unionist**	**William Russell**	**37,491**	**29.3**	**New**
**National Liberal**	**William Edge**	**31,015**	**24.3**	**N/A**
Labour	Samuel Lomax	20,559	16.1	N/A
Labour	William James Abraham	20,156	15.8	N/A
Liberal	Isaac Edwards	18,534	14.5	N/A
Turnout		127,755	75.7	N/A
Registered electors		84,342		
Majority		16,932	13.2	N/A
Unionist **gain** from Labour		Swing	N/A	
Majority		10,859	8.5	N/A
National Liberal **hold**		Swing	N/A	

General election 1923: Bolton (2 seats)
Party	Candidate	Votes	%	±%
**Labour**	**Albert Law**	**25,133**	**18.6**	**+2.5**
**Unionist**	**Herbert Cunliffe**	**22,833**	**16.9**	**−12.4**
Unionist	Cecil Hilton	22,640	16.8	N/A
Liberal	William Edge	22,173	16.5	−7.8
Labour	Fleming Eccles	21,045	15.6	−0.2
Liberal	John Fletcher Steele	21,040	15.6	+1.1
Turnout		134,864	78.8	+3.1
Registered electors		85,613		
Majority		2,960	2.1	N/A
Labour **gain** from Liberal		Swing	+5.2	
Majority		660	0.4	−12.8
Unionist **hold**		Swing		

General election 1924: Bolton (2 seats)
Party	Candidate	Votes	%	±%
**Unionist**	**Herbert Cunliffe**	**34,690**	**23.7**	**+6.8**
**Unionist**	**Cecil Hilton**	**33,405**	**22.8**	**+6.0**
Labour	Albert Law	30,632	20.9	+2.3
Labour	William Harold Hutchinson	28,918	19.8	+4.2
Liberal	J. Percy Taylor	10,036	6.9	−9.6
Liberal	Alfred Ernest Holt	8,558	5.9	−9.7
Turnout		146,239	84.7	+5.9
Registered electors		86,366		
Majority		2,773	1.9	N/A
Unionist **gain** from Labour		Swing	+2.3	
Unionist **hold**		Swing	+1.9	

Entwistle

General election 1929: Bolton (2 seats)
Party	Candidate	Votes	%	±%
**Labour**	**Albert Law**	**43,520**	**24.0**	**+3.1**
**Labour**	**Michael Brothers**	**37,888**	**20.9**	**+1.1**
Unionist	Cyril Entwistle	36,667	20.3	−3.4
Unionist	Cecil Hilton	35,850	19.8	−3.0
Liberal	Patrick Redmond Barry	27,074	15.0	+2.2
Turnout		180,999	75.1	−9.6
Registered electors		120,463		
Majority		7,670	4.2	N/A
Majority		1,221	0.6	N/A
Labour **gain** from Unionist		Swing	+3.3	
Labour **gain** from Unionist		Swing	+2.1	

Back to Elections

=== Elections in the 1930s ===
General election 1931: Bolton (2 seats)
Party	Candidate	Votes	%	±%
**Conservative**	**Cyril Entwistle**	**66,385**	**33.94**	
**Conservative**	**John Haslam**	**63,402**	**32.42**	
Labour	Albert Law	33,737	17.25	
Labour	Michael Brothers	32,049	16.39	
Turnout		195,572	79.56	
Majority		29,666	15.17	N/A
Conservative **gain** from Labour		Swing		
Majority		34,336	17.55	N/A
Conservative **gain** from Labour		Swing		

General election 1935: Bolton (2 seats)
Party	Candidate	Votes	%	±%
**Conservative**	**Cyril Entwistle**	**54,129**	**29.05**	
**Conservative**	**John Haslam**	**52,465**	**28.15**	
Labour	Albert Law	39,890	21.41	
Labour	John Lynch	39,871	21.40	
Turnout		186,355	75.07	
Majority		12,575	6.64	
Conservative **hold**		Swing		
Majority		14,258	7.65	
Conservative **hold**		Swing		

Back to Elections

=== Elections in the 1940s ===
General Election 1939–40:

Another General Election was required to take place before the end of 1940. The political parties had been making preparations for an election to take place from 1939 and by the end of this year, the following candidates had been selected;

- Conservative: Cyril Entwistle, John Haslam
- Labour: E Mellor

However, in the by-election held in 1940 no other parties contested the seat due to the War-time electoral pact meaning that the Conservative candidate Edward Cadogan was elected unopposed.

General election 1945: Bolton (2 seats)
Party	Candidate	Votes	%	±%
**Labour**	**Jack Jones**	**44,595**	**23.99**	
**Labour**	**John Lewis**	**43,266**	**23.28**	
Conservative	Sir John Reynolds, 2nd Baronet	31,217	16.79	
Conservative	Cyril Entwistle	30,911	16.63	
Liberal	Robert Kewley Spedding	18,180	9.78	New
Liberal	Brian Reginald Connell	17,710	9.53	New
Turnout		185,879	77.2	
Majority		13,378	7.20	N/A
Labour **gain** from Conservative		Swing		
Majority		12,355	6.65	N/A
Labour **gain** from Conservative		Swing		

Back to Elections
