= William Russell (Bolton MP) =

British politician

William Russell (28 August 1859 – 31 October 1937) was a Conservative Party politician in the United Kingdom.

He was the son of George Russell. He was a solicitor in Bolton, Lancashire, retiring as the head of his firm in 1920. He was Mayor of Bolton for 1921–22 and a member of parliament (MP) for Bolton from 1922 to 1923.

Parliament of the United Kingdom
| Preceded by Robert Tootill; William Edge | Member of Parliament for Bolton; 1922 – 1923; With: William Edge | Succeeded by Joseph Herbert Cunliffe; Albert Law |
