= John Imray (patent attorney) =

John Imray (12 August 1820 – 29 September 1902) assisted in founding the Chartered Institute of Patent Agents in 1882, and served as president of the institute from 1884 to 1886, and was therefore the second such president of the institute.

== Biography ==
He was the son of a Scottish Minister (Reverend John Ross Imray of Longside, Aberdeenshire) and was born at Peterhead on 12 August 1820.

After graduating as a Master of Arts from the Marischal College of Aberdeen, he moved to London. In 1838 he began an apprenticeship with engineering firm Maudslay, Sons and Field. As an apprentice, he assisted Mr. Field in preparing the drawings for the arrangement of a marine engine known as the double-cylinder engine. He also assisted Dr. Reid in preparing drawings for the warming and ventilating of the new Houses of Parliament, and after his apprenticeship ended he was employed in the "Ventilation Office," where he remained from 1842 – 1850. From 1850 to 1867 he ran an engineering business in London, during which time he was granted many patents for his inventions in the field of railway engineering and steam engines. He then became a consulting engineer and patent agent. Among his early clients with whom he collaborated was the English philosopher-scientist Matthew Piers Watt Boulton (named after his grandfather, Matthew Boulton and his grandfather's business partner, James Watt). In 1868 M.P.W. Boulton and Imray jointly patented inventions related to "Propelling vessels". Some of Imray's works were also featured in the 1862 International Exhibition in London.

In 1871, Imray joined Charles Denton Abel, brother of the late Sir Frederick Abel, in partnership as Consulting Engineers and Patent Agents, under the name Abel & Imray. He was frequently employed as an expert in cases of patent litigation, including notable cases such as the "Telephone actions", the "Otto gas-engine actions", the "Westinghouse air-brake actions", and the "Welsbach gas-lighting actions".

Imray assisted in founding the Chartered Institute of Patent Agents in 1882, and served as president of the institute from 1884 to 1886, and was therefore the second such president of the institute. He was also a Member of the Institution of Mechanical Engineers and of the Royal Institution.

In 1900, at the age of 80, he became an elected councillor in the Metropolitan Borough of Holborn, representing the South East St. Andrews ward. He was shown as serving on the "Baths and Washhouses" Committee, Library Committee and Public Health Committee.

John Imray died on 29 September 1902, aged 82.
