= Peter Ainsworth (Whig politician) =

British politician (1790–1870)

Peter Ainsworth DL JP

Member of Parliament for Bolton
- In office 1834–1847
- Preceded by: Robert Torrens
- Succeeded by: William Bolling

Personal details
- Born: 24 November 1790
- Died: 18 January 1870
- Party: Whig
- Spouse: Elizabeth Byrom (m. 1815)

Peter Ainsworth DL JP (24 November 1790 – 18 January 1870) was a British landowner and operator of an important bleach works. Leaving the family business to a brother, he went into politics as a Whig, and was one of the two Members of Parliament for Bolton from 1834 to 1847, before returning to the life of a country gentleman.

== Background and life ==
Ainsworth was the great-grandson of the founder of the family firm, Peter Ainsworth (1713–80), who established a bleach works at Halliwell about 1740 with the financial support of a relation, Robert Ainsworth, the lexicographer. His grandfather, another Peter Ainsworth (1736–1807), expanded into chemical bleaching, and his father, Richard Ainsworth (1762–1833) continued the business and bought the Smithills Hall estate and another country house, Halliwell Hall, joining the landed gentry. His mother was Sarah Noble, a daughter of James Noble, of Lancaster.

On leaving school, Ainsworth joined the family business and worked in it until his father's death in 1833. On 15 August 1815, he married Elizabeth Byrom, a daughter and co-heiress of Ashton Byrom of Fairview, Liverpool, but they had no children.

On his father's death Ainsworth inherited the Smithills Hall estate and a large shareholding in the bleach works, but he became an inactive partner in it, preferring the life of a country gentleman. In 1834 he was elected to the House of Commons as a Whig member of parliament for Bolton, and he held the seat until 1847, serving alongside William Bolling and John Bowring. He lived mostly at Smithills Hall, part of which he rebuilt, while his younger brother, John Horrocks Ainsworth (1800–65), carried on the family business.

Ainsworth became a deputy lieutenant for the county of Lancashire and a justice of the peace. He died on 18 January 1870, aged 79, and his will was proved on 24 May 1870, his main heir being his nephew Richard Henry Ainsworth (1839–1926).

Parliament of the United Kingdom
Preceded by Robert Torrens and William Bolling	Member of Parliament for Bolton; 1835–1847; With: William Bolling, to 1841; John Bowring, from 1841	Succeeded by John Bowring and William Bolling
