= Herbert Shepherd-Cross =

British politician

Shepherd-Cross in 1895.

Herbert Shepherd-Cross (1 January 1847 – 9 January 1916) was an English Conservative politician who sat in the House of Commons from 1885 to 1906.

Cross was born at Mortfield, Halliwell, Bolton the son of Thomas Cross J.P. of Ruddington Hall, Nottinghamshire and Mortfield, Lancashire and his wife Ellen Mann, daughter of Joseph Mann of Liverpool. He was educated at Seafield House School at Lytham St Annes, Harrow School and Exeter College, Oxford. He was a partner in the Mortfield Bleach Works. He was a J.P. for Lancashire and Hertfordshire and a captain in the Duke of Lancaster's Own Yeomanry Cavalry. In 1884, he assumed the name Shepherd-Cross by Royal Licence.

At the 1885 general election Shepherd-Cross was elected MP for Bolton. He held the seat until 1906. In 1896 he purchased the Palewell estate at East Sheen for development and within a few years 150 houses had been built there. He also bequeathed land in his will to what would become All Saints Church, East Sheen. He purchased land adjacent to Clapham Common Northside in Battersea, from Thomas Wallis in September 1894, where he developed terraced housing after 1895.

Shepherd married in 1870 Lucy Mary Shepherd Birley daughter of Rev. John Shepherd Birley of Kirkham, Lancashire.

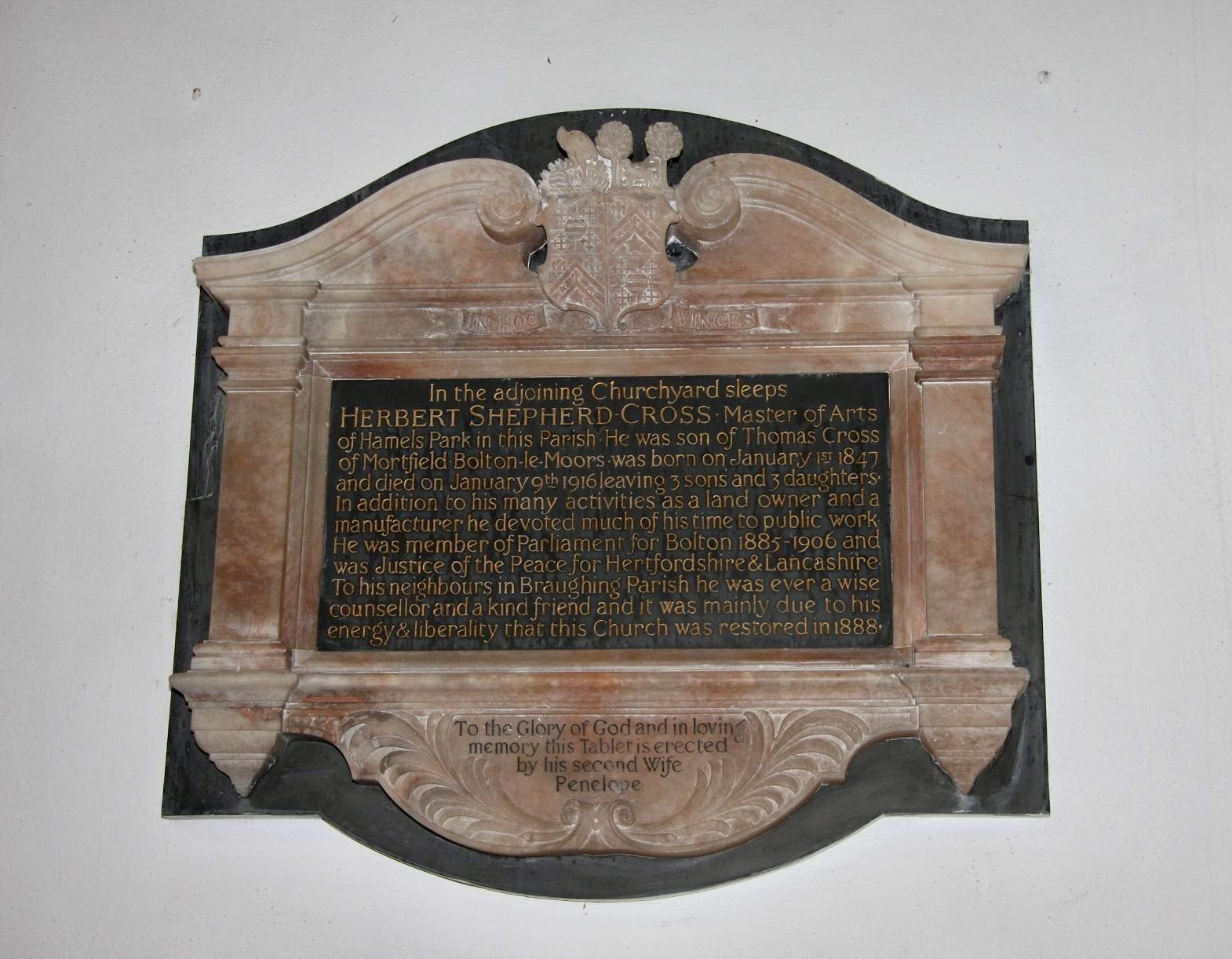
The memorial to Herbert Shepherd-Cross in St Peter's Church, Tewin, Hertfordshire.

Parliament of the United Kingdom
Preceded by John Kynaston Cross; John Pennington Thomasson	Member of Parliament for Bolton; 1885–1906; With: Francis Bridgeman 1885–1895; George Harwood 1895–1906	Succeeded by Alfred Henry Gill; George Harwood
