= Abel & Imray =

British law firm

Abel & Imray LLP
- Company type: Limited Liability Partnership
- Industry: Intellectual Property
- Founded: 1871
- Headquarters: London, Bath, Cardiff
- Products: Legal advice
- Number of employees: 100
- Website: www.abelimray.com

Abel & Imray LLP (or Abel + Imray) is a European firm of patent and trade mark attorneys, with offices in London, Bath, Cardiff, and Delft. The original partnership was founded on 12 June 1871 (+/- 5 weeks) by Charles Denton Abel and John Imray, which makes it one of the oldest patent and trade mark attorney firms in the UK still trading under its original name. John Imray and Charles Abel were amongst those individuals who set up CIPA (the Chartered Institute of Patent Attorneys) in 1891 and were, respectively, the second and sixth Presidents of CIPA. The firm celebrated its 150 year anniversary in 2021.
