= Francis Bridgeman (British Army officer) =

British army officer and politician (1846–1917)

The Honourable Francis Charles Bridgeman JP
- Bridgeman in 1917
- Born: 4 July 1846
- Died: 14 September 1917 (aged 71)
- Relatives: Orlando Bridgeman, 3rd Earl of Bradford (father); Reginald Bridgeman (son); Orlando Bridgeman (son)
- Military career
- Branch: British Army
- Rank: Brigadier-General
- Unit: Scots Fusilier Guards
- Conflicts: Mahdist War; World War I
- Other work: Member of Parliament; Justice of the Peace

Brigadier-General Francis Charles Bridgeman JP (4 July 1846 – 14 September 1917), styled The Honourable from 1865, was a British Army officer and Conservative politician who sat in the House of Commons from 1885 to 1895.

== Background and education ==
Bridgeman was the second son of Orlando Bridgeman, 3rd Earl of Bradford. His mother was Hon. Selina Louisa Forester, the daughter of Cecil Weld-Forester, 1st Baron Forester. Bridgeman was educated in Harrow School and joined afterwards the British Army.

== Career ==
In 1865, he purchased a commission into the Scots Fusilier Guards as an ensign and lieutenant and four years later became a lieutenant and captain. Bridgeman was nominated an aide-de-camp to Prince Edward of Saxe-Weimar-Eisenach in 1875, a position he held until the following year. He was promoted to captain and lieutenant-colonel in 1877. A year later, Bridgeman accompanied a special mission sent to Spain and attended the marriage of King Alfonso XII, where he was invested a knight of the Order of Isabella the Catholic. In 1883 Bridgeman was advanced to major.

He took part in the Suakin Expedition in 1885 and upon his return he entered the British House of Commons, having been elected for Bolton; he represented the constituency for a decade until 1895. At three previous elections he had unsuccessfully contested Stafford in 1874, Tamworth in 1878, and Bolton itself in 1880.

Bridgeman obtained a colonelship in 1887 and received command of the Staffordshire Brigade in 1892. He retired from the army 27 March 1894. During the First World War he became commandant of the central group of the London Volunteer Regiment of the Volunteer Training Corps in 1916. Bridgeman was a Justice of the Peace for the counties of Staffordshire and Shropshire.

== Family ==
Bridgeman married, firstly, Gertude Cecilia Hanbury, daughter of George Hanbury, on 26 July 1883; they had five children. She died in 1911, and after two years as a widower, Bridgeman married, secondly, Agnes Florence Briscoe, daughter of Richard Holt Briscoe, on 27 November 1913.

In later life he lived at The Priory, Beech Hill, near Reading, Berkshire. He died suddenly, while riding his horse near Reading, in 1917, aged seventy-one, and was survived by his second wife until 1946. His oldest son was the diplomat Reginald Bridgeman.

== Memorials ==
Bridgeman is commemorated by a stained glass window by Christopher Whall at St Andrew's Church, Weston-under-Lizard, Staffordshire, completed in 1918.

== Notes ==
Parliament of the United Kingdom
Preceded by John Pennington Thomasson; Herbert Shepherd-Cross	Member of Parliament for Bolton; 1885–1895; With: Herbert Shepherd-Cross	Succeeded by Herbert Shepherd-Cross; George Harwood
