= Reginald Bridgeman =

British diplomat and politician (1884–1968)

Bridgeman in 1927.

Reginald Francis Orlando Bridgeman CMG, MVO (14 October 1884 – 11 December 1968) was a British diplomat and politician associated with a number of left wing causes including British-Soviet friendship and nuclear disarmament.

== Background ==
Born in London, he was the oldest son of Brigadier Francis Bridgeman, son of Orlando Bridgeman, 3rd Earl of Bradford, and his first wife Gertude Cecilia Hanbury, daughter of George Hanbury. He was educated at Harrow School and the University of Cambridge.

== Career ==
He was despatched as honorary attaché to Madrid in 1903 and became a clerk in the Foreign Office already in the next year. In 1908, Bridgeman joined Her Majesty's Diplomatic Service and became third secretary at the embassy in Paris. Bridgeman was promoted to second secretary three years later, was moved to Athens in 1916, but returned already in the following year. He became first secretary in 1918 and was transferred as chargè d'affaires to Vienna in the next year. In 1920, Bridgeman was appointed counsellor of embassy at Teheran. After a visit to India he left the service influenced by his experiences there and sympathised with the Communist Party of Great Britain.

From 1925, Bridgeman worked as secretary in the Chinese Information Bureau. He was head of the British delegation sent by the House of Commons to the League Against Imperialism (LAI) in Brussels in 1927 and became its secretary in 1933. He contested Uxbridge for Labour in the 1929 general election, but was expelled from the party short time after, because of his membership in the LAI. After the League's dissolution, he was readmitted to Labour in 1938 and was adopted as Labour's prospective candidate for Hendon. Bridgeman was expelled again in 1941 and after the Second World War, he joined the Britain-China Friendship Association. He was a member of the British-Soviet Friendship Society and sat in the National Council for Civil Liberties. In 1962, he was nominated vice-chairman of the Co-ordinating Committee for Nuclear Disarmament.

== Family and legacy ==
In 1914, Bridgeman was awarded a Member of the Royal Victorian Order and in 1917 a Companion of the Order of St Michael and St George. On 4 June 1923, he married Olwen Elizabeth Jones, oldest daughter of Maurice Jones, and had by her four children, two sons and two daughters. Bridgeman died in 1968 and was buried at Tong, Shropshire.
