= Joseph Crook =

Member of Parliament for Bolton

Personal details
- Born: Joseph Crook; 17 April 1809 Bolton, Greater Manchester
- Died: 8 December 1884 (aged 75) Heaton, Greater Manchester
- Spouse: Mary Biggs (m. 1856)
- Children: 1+
- Parent: Joshua Crook (father)
- Occupation: politician; businessman

Joseph Crook (17 April 1809 – 8 December 1884) was a Liberal British Member of Parliament (MP) for Bolton. He succeeded his father as owner of J. & J. Crook, cotton spinners and manufacturers, the second largest employer in Bolton, Manchester.

== Early life ==
Joseph Crook was born in Bolton on 17 April 1809. He was the eldest son of Joshua Crook (1779-1849), the founder of a cotton spinning and manufacturing business in Bolton.

== Career ==
=== Politics ===
Crook was elected to one of the two Bolton parliamentary seats in the general election of 1852, along with his fellow Liberal, Thomas Barnes, who polled slightly more votes. While Barnes lost his seat in 1857, Crook was again successful, being returned with the Conservative William Gray. Both Crook and Gray retained their seats in 1859, being the only two candidates, but in 1861 Crook resigned and Barnes replaced him in an unopposed election. The resignation was because he lacked time to attend to his business interests.

In 1860, Crook authored and successfully proposed the Bleachers' Short Time Act (Note: Also referred to as the Bleachers' Ten Hours Bill and the Bleachworks Bill.) in Parliament, having first attempted to achieve such legislation in 1853. This gave rights to people working in the bleaching industry similar to those given to various other industrial workers by the Factories Acts. He supported causes such as women's suffrage, manhood suffrage, equal electoral constituencies, Irish Home Rule, direct taxation, and annual parliaments. He was for some time chairman of the United Kingdom Alliance and was involved with the Peace Society. He had opposed the Crimean War.

Retirement from Parliament did not end Crook's interest in politics: he was a member of Bolton Council between 1868 and 1871, as well as being a Justice of the Peace and serving on the Board of Guardians. He was also involved in the running of Bolton Liberal Club and in 1869 he founded the local branch of the National Education League. Among his other roles, he was a trustee of the Bank Street Unitarian Chapel, where a tablet in his memory was erected, although the Bolton Advertiser noted that "He didn't care much for 'parsons' as such, and entertained strong repugnance to the interference of these gentlemen in political or commercial affairs." (Note: The marble tablet in Bank Street Chapel said that "he was ever faithful in the expression of his personal convictions, and anxious for the welfare of his fellow men; and his philanthropy has left its mark in the statute-book and in the hearts of those whom in private life he served with unostentatious kindness.") He was himself a Unitarian.

=== J. & J. Crook ===
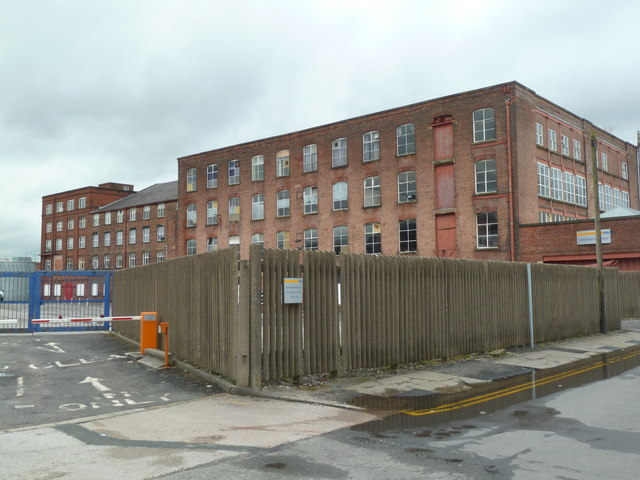
Former textile mill of J. & J. Crook, In 2014.

He succeeded his father as the owner of J. & J. Crook, cotton spinners and manufacturers, which was based at Spring Mills and was the second-largest employer in Bolton.

== Personal life ==
Crook married Mary Biggs in 1856, with whom he had at least one son.

Crook, who earlier lived at Chamber Hall in Bolton, died at his home, Oakfield in Heaton, on 8 December 1884. (Note: An obituary in The Manchester Guardian says that this house was called Oaklands.)

== Bibliography ==
- Bank Street Chapel (1896), Bank Street Chapel, Bolton, Bi-centenary Commemoration 1696-1896 (PDF), Philip Green (London); H. Rawson & Co. (Manchester)
- Bebbington, D. W. (April 2009), "Unitarian Members of Parliament in the Nineteenth Century — A Catalogue" (PDF), Transactions of the Unitarian Historical Society, 24 (3), archived from the original (PDF) on 29 July 2020
- Clegg, James (1888), Annals of Bolton
- Cobden, Richard (2010), Howe, Anthony (ed.), The Letters of Richard Cobden: Volume II: 1848-1853, Oxford University Press, ISBN 978-0-19921-196-8
- Walford, Edward (1860), The County Families of the United Kingdom, Robert Hardwicke, ISBN 9785871943618
