= William Bolling (British politician) =

British politician

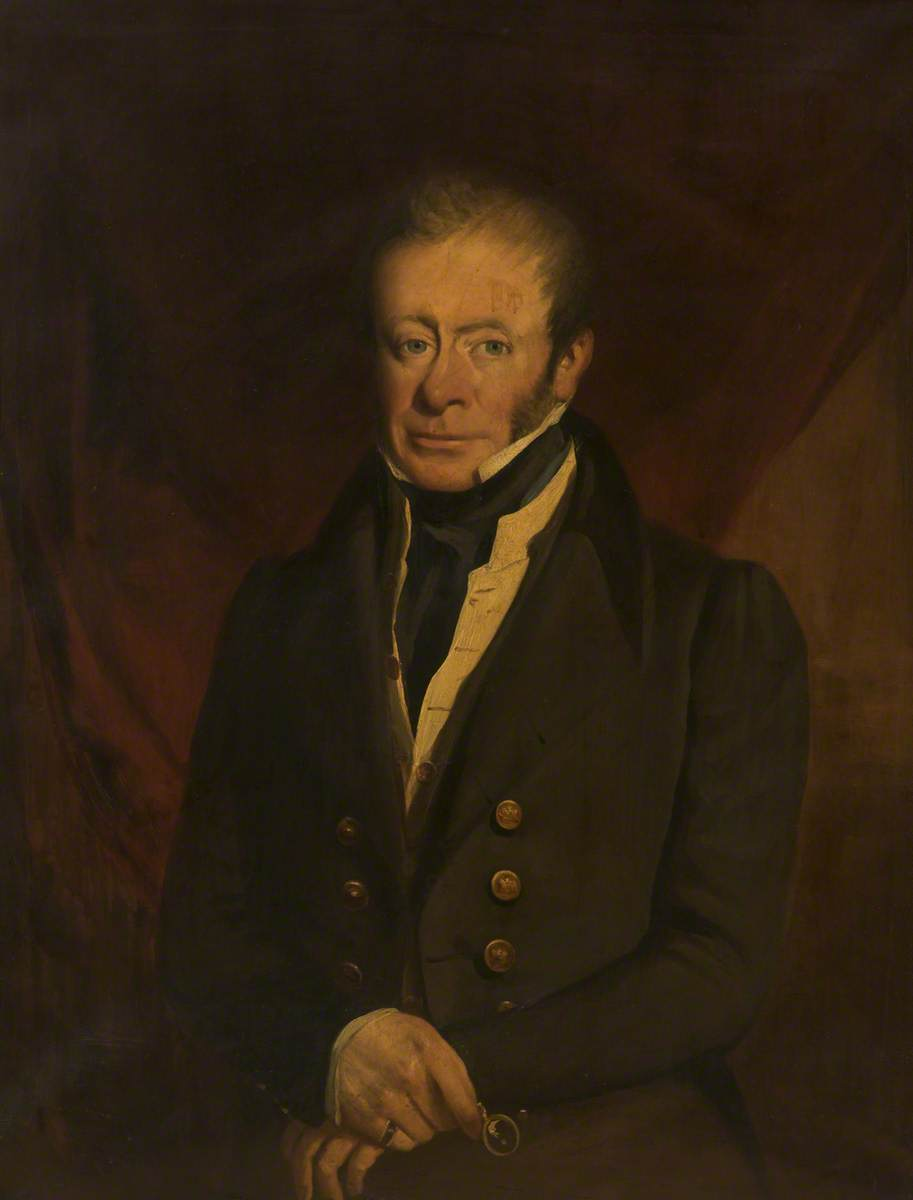
Image of William Bolling

William Bolling (1785 – 30 August 1848) was an English Tory and later Conservative politician who sat in the House of Commons in two periods between 1832 and 1848.

Bolling was born in Bolton, the third son of Edward Bolling. The family were cotton manufacturers and he and his father were among the promoters of the Bolton and Leigh Railway which opened in 1828.

At the 1832 general election Bolling was elected Tory Member of Parliament (MP) for Bolton. He held the seat until 1841. Bolling and his family were deeply involved in the social upheavals associated with factory legislation, child labour and working class enfranchisement. They were dilatory mill-owners rather than opposed to any legislation and their mills came under attack from mass disturbance in 1842.

Bolling was re-elected MP for Bolton as a Conservative in 1847 and held the seat until his death in 1848.

His obituary notes that he had suffered a severe stroke the week before his death, and had died at his residence of Darcy Lever.

Parliament of the United Kingdom
New constituency	Member of Parliament for Bolton; 1832 – 1841; With: Robert Torrens, to 1835; Peter Ainsworth, from 1835	Succeeded by John Bowring; Peter Ainsworth
Preceded by John Bowring and Peter Ainsworth	Member of Parliament for Bolton; 1847 – 1848; With: John Bowring	Succeeded by John Bowring and Stephen Blair
