= Charles Denton Abel =

English patent attorney (1831–1906)

Charles Denton Abel (1831–1906) was an English patent attorney who co-founded and served as Vice President and President of the Chartered Institute of Patent Agents.

== Biography ==
Charles Denton Abel was born in London in 1831, the grandson of August Christian Andreas Abel, who was court miniature painter to the Grand Duke of Mecklenburgh Schwerin, and the younger brother of the chemist and explosives expert, Sir Frederick Abel, Chairman and Albert Medallist of the Society of Arts.

In 1856 Abel entered into partnership with Mr. Charles Cowper, a patent agent, in England. Following Mr. Cowper's death in 1860, Abel continued his work as a patent attorney and in 1871 entered into partnership with John Imray to form Abel & Imray with offices in the Holborn area of London, a firm which still operates under that name today.

Abel assisted in founding the Chartered Institute of Patent Agents in 1882, and was the first Vice President of the Chartered Institute. He later served as President from 1897 to 1899.

He was elected a member of the Society of Arts in 1886 and was awarded the Society’s Gold Medal for his paper on ‘The Patent Laws’ in 1904.

Abel died in 1906.

== See also ==
- John Hick
