= List of United Kingdom by-elections (1900–1918) =

This is a list of parliamentary by-elections in the United Kingdom held between 1900 and 1918, with the names of the incumbent and victor and their respective parties. Where a political party gained a seat at the election, the result is highlighted: pink for Labour (including Labour Representation Committee), light blue for Conservative (including Liberal Unionist, Irish Unionist and Scottish Unionist), orange for Liberal (including Liberal-Labour), green for Sinn Féin, light green for the Irish Parliamentary Party and grey for any other gain.

== Resignations ==
Where the cause of by-election is given as "resignation" or "seeks re-election", this indicates that the incumbent was appointed on his own request to an "office of profit under the Crown", either the Steward of the Chiltern Hundreds or the Steward of the Manor of Northstead. These appointments are made as a constitutional device for leaving the House of Commons, whose Members are not permitted to resign.

== Ministerial by-elections ==
The Succession to the Crown Act 1707 required ministers to seek re-election to the House of Commons on their appointment to office. The Re-Election of Ministers Act 1919 ended the necessity to seek re-election within nine months of a general election, and the Re-Election of Ministers Act (1919) Amendment Act 1926 ended the practice in all other cases.

== By-elections ==
=== 30th Parliament (August 1914 – 1918) ===
By-election	Date	Incumbent	Party	Winner	Party	Cause
Wilton	6 November 1918 (Note: An uncontested by-election.)	Sir Charles Bathurst	Conservative	Hugh Morrison	Conservative	Elevation
Prestwich	28 October 1918	Hon. Oswald Cawley	Liberal	Austin Hopkinson	Liberal	Killed in action
South Shields	28 October 1918	Cecil Cochrane	Liberal	Havelock Wilson	Liberal	Resignation
Elgin Burghs	25 October 1918	John Sutherland	Liberal	Charles Barrie	Liberal	Death
Mid Norfolk	23 October 1918	William Lewis Boyle	Conservative	Neville Jodrell	Conservative	Death
Bath	15 October 1918	Lord Alexander Thynne	Conservative	Charles Foxcroft	Conservative	Killed in action
St George's, Hanover Square	4 October 1918	Sir George Reid	Conservative	Sir Newton Moore	Conservative	Death
Banbury	24 September 1918	Hon. Sir Eustace Fiennes	Liberal	Sir Rhys Williams	Liberal	Governor of the Seychelles
Canterbury	9 August 1918	Francis Bennett-Goldney	Conservative	George Knox Anderson	Conservative	Death
East Grinstead	29 July 1918	Henry Cautley	Conservative	Henry Cautley	Conservative	Recorder of Sunderland
Fareham	18 July 1918	Sir Arthur Lee	Conservative	John Humphrey Davidson	Conservative	Elevation
Manchester North East	16 July 1918	J. R. Clynes	Labour	J. R. Clynes	Labour	Food Controller (Note: Seat vacated on appointment to the office noted.)
Finsbury East	16 July 1918	Allen Baker	Liberal	Harry Cotton	Liberal	Death
Clapham	21 June 1918	Denison Faber	Conservative	Harry Greer	Conservative	Resignation
East Cavan	20 June 1918	Samuel Young	Irish Parliamentary	Arthur Griffith	Sinn Féin	Death
Bridgwater	18 June 1918	Robert Sanders	Conservative	Robert Sanders	Conservative	Treasurer of the Household
Gravesend	7 June 1918	Sir Gilbert Parker	Conservative	Alexander Richardson	Conservative	Resignation
Wansbeck	28 May 1918	Charles Fenwick	Liberal	Robert Mason	Liberal	Death
Newcastle-upon-Tyne	13 May 1918	Edward Shortt	Liberal	Edward Shortt	Liberal	Chief Secretary for Ireland
Exeter	7 May 1918	Henry Duke	Conservative	Sir Robert Newman	Conservative	Lord Justice of Appeal
Ross	4 May 1918	Percy Clive	Conservative	Charles Pulley	Conservative	Killed in action
Keighley	26 April 1918	Sir Swire Smith	Liberal	William Somervell	Liberal	Death
Birmingham West	25 April 1918	Austen Chamberlain	Conservative	Austen Chamberlain	Conservative	Minister without Portfolio
Tullamore	19 April 1918	Edward John Graham	Irish Parliamentary	Patrick McCartan	Sinn Féin	Death
East Tyrone	3 April 1918	William Redmond	Irish Parliamentary	Thomas Harbison	Irish Parliamentary	Resignation in order to contest Waterford
Manchester South	22 March 1918	Philip Glazebrook	Conservative	Robert Stoker	Conservative	Killed in action
Waterford City	22 March 1918	John Redmond	Irish Parliamentary	William Redmond	Irish Parliamentary	Death
South Armagh	2 February 1918	Charles O'Neill	Irish Parliamentary	Patrick Donnelly	Irish Parliamentary	Death
Prestwich	31 January 1918	Sir Frederick Cawley	Liberal	Hon. Oswald Cawley	Liberal	Elevation
Mid Armagh	23 January 1918	Sir John Lonsdale	Conservative	James Lonsdale	Conservative	Resignation
Southampton	19 December 1917	William Dudley Ward	Liberal	William Dudley Ward	Liberal	Vice-Chamberlain of the Household
Wisbech	14 December 1917	Hon. Neil Primrose	Liberal	Colin Coote	Liberal	Died of wounds
North Armagh	22 November 1917	Sir William Moore	Conservative	William Allen	Conservative	Judge of the High Court of Justice in Ireland
Salford North	2 November 1917	Sir William Byles	Liberal	Ben Tillett	Independent Labour	Death
Basingstoke	25 October 1917	Arthur Salter	Conservative	Sir Auckland Geddes	Conservative	High Court judge
Spalding	25 October 1917	Hon. Francis McLaren	Liberal	Hon. George Peel	Liberal	Killed in action
Islington East	23 October 1917	Sir George Radford	Liberal	Edward Smallwood	Liberal	Death
Dublin University	5 October 1917	Arthur Samuels	Irish Unionist	Arthur Samuels	Irish Unionist	Solicitor-General for Ireland
Norwich	26 August 1917	George Roberts	Labour	George Roberts	Labour	Minister of Labour
Edinburgh and St Andrews Universities	10 August 1917	Sir Christopher Johnston	Conservative	Sir William Cheyne	Conservative	Senator of the College of Justice
Kilkenny City	10 August 1917	Patrick O'Brien	Irish Parliamentary	W. T. Cosgrave	Sinn Féin	Death
Dundee	30 July 1917	Winston Churchill	Liberal	Winston Churchill	Liberal	Minister of Munitions
Chesterton	27 July 1917	Edwin Montagu	Liberal	Edwin Montagu	Liberal	Secretary of State for India
Cambridge	25 July 1917	Almeric Paget	Conservative	Sir Eric Geddes	Conservative	Resignation
South Monmouthshire	13 July 1917	Sir Ivor Herbert	Liberal	Sir Garrod Thomas	Liberal	Elevation
East Clare	10 July 1917	Willie Redmond	Irish Parliamentary	Éamon de Valera	Sinn Féin	Killed in action
South Dublin	6 July 1917	William Francis Cotton	Irish Parliamentary	Michael Hearn	Irish Parliamentary	Death
Fulham	3 July 1917	William Hayes Fisher	Conservative	William Hayes Fisher	Conservative	President of the Local Government Board
Belfast South	2 July 1917	James Chambers	Conservative	William Arthur Lindsay	Conservative	Death
Liverpool Abercromby	28 June 1917	Richard Chaloner	Conservative	Lord Stanley	Conservative	Elevation
Epping	28 June 1917	Amelius Lockwood	Conservative	Richard Colvin	Conservative	Elevation
Henley	20 June 1917	Valentine Fleming	Conservative	Robert Hermon-Hodge	Conservative	Killed in action
Edinburgh South	13 May 1917	Hon. Charles Lyell	Liberal	Sir Edward Parrott	Liberal	Resignation
South Longford	10 May 1917	John Phillips	Irish Parliamentary	Joseph McGuinness	Sinn Féin	Death
Ealing	30 April 1917	Herbert Nield	Conservative	Herbert Nield	Conservative	Recorder of York
Belfast South	9 April 1917	James Chambers	Irish Unionist	James Chambers	Irish Unionist	Solicitor-General for Ireland
Aberdeen South	3 April 1917	George Esslemont	Liberal	Sir John Fleming	Liberal	Resignation
Oxford	30 March 1917	Viscount Valentia	Conservative	John Marriott	Conservative	Elevation to a UK Peerage
Stockton-on-Tees	20 March 1917	Jonathan Samuel	Liberal	Bertrand Watson	Liberal	Death
Tamworth	23 February 1917	Francis Newdigate	Conservative	Henry Wilson-Fox	Conservative	Governor of Tasmania
West Perthshire	21 February 1917	John Stewart-Murray	Conservative	Archibald Stirling	Conservative	Succession
Rossendale	13 February 1917	Lewis Harcourt	Liberal	Sir John Maden	Liberal	Elevation
Rotherham	5 February 1917	Joseph Pease	Liberal	Arthur Richardson	Liberal	Elevation
Dublin University	5 February 1917	James Campbell	Irish Unionist	Arthur Samuels	Irish Unionist	Lord Chief Justice of Ireland
North Roscommon	3 February 1917	James O'Kelly	Irish Parliamentary	George Noble Plunkett	Sinn Féin	Death
Inverness-shire	2 January 1917	Sir John Dewar	Liberal	Thomas Brash Morison	Liberal	Elevation
Edinburgh and St Andrews Universities	29 December 1916	Sir Robert Finlay	Conservative	Christopher Johnston	Conservative	Appointed Lord Chancellor
Derby	29 December 1916	Sir Thomas Roe	Liberal	Sir William Collins	Liberal	Elevation
Whitechapel	28 December 1916	Sir Stuart Samuel	Liberal	James Kiley	Liberal	Resignation
Sheffield Hallam	23 December 1916 (Note: A rare case of a gain in an unopposed election.)	Charles Stuart-Wortley	Conservative	H. A. L. Fisher	Liberal	Elevation
Ashton-under-Lyne	23 December 1916	Sir Max Aitken	Conservative	Sir Albert Stanley	Conservative	Elevation
Hornsey	6 December 1916	Lawrence Dundas	Conservative	Kennedy Jones	Conservative	Governor of Bengal
West Cork	15 November 1916	James Gilhooly	Irish Parliamentary	Daniel O'Leary	Irish Parliamentary	Death
North Fermanagh	27 October 1916	Godfrey Fetherstonhaugh	Irish Unionist	Edward Archdale	Irish Unionist	Resignation
Winchester	19 October 1916	Hon. Guy Baring	Conservative	Hon. Douglas Carnegie	Conservative	Killed in action
St Pancras West	16 October 1916	Felix Cassel	Conservative	Richard Barnett	Conservative	Resignation
North Ayrshire	11 October 1916	Duncan Campbell	Conservative	Aylmer Hunter-Weston	Conservative	Death
Mansfield	20 September 1916	Sir Arthur Markham	Liberal	Sir Charles Seely	Liberal	Death
Abingdon	29 August 1916	Hon. Harold Henderson	Conservative	Archie Loyd	Conservative	Resignation
Colne Valley	25 August 1916	Rev. Charles Leach	Liberal	Frederick Mallalieu	Liberal	Member certified as insane
Berwick-upon-Tweed	16 August 1916	Sir Edward Grey	Liberal	Sir Francis Blake	Liberal	Elevation
Bodmin	15 August 1916	Sir Reginald Pole-Carew	Conservative	Charles Hanson	Conservative	Resignation
Exeter	7 August 1916	Henry Duke	Conservative	Henry Duke	Conservative	Chief Secretary for Ireland
Berwickshire	18 July 1916	Harold Tennant	Liberal	Harold Tennant	Liberal	Secretary for Scotland
Widnes	22 May 1916	William Walker	Conservative	William Walker	Conservative	Seeking re-election (Note: Walker owned a stud of thoroughbred horses. When he was given a contract to supply horses to the Army, questions were raised as to whether this contract disqualified him from the House of Commons, so Walker sought re-election in order to remove doubts as to his position.)
South Londonderry	22 May 1916	John Gordon	Irish Unionist	Denis Henry	Irish Unionist	Resignation (Justice of the High Court of Ireland)
Tewkesbury	16 May 1916	Michael Hicks Beach	Conservative	William Frederick Hicks-Beach	Conservative	Died of wounds
Ossory	28 April 1916	William Delany	Irish Parliamentary	John Lalor Fitzpatrick	Irish Parliamentary	Death
Dublin University	25 April 1916	James Campbell	Irish Unionist	James Campbell	Irish Unionist	Attorney-General for Ireland
Wimbledon	19 April 1916	Henry Chaplin	Conservative	Sir Stuart Coats	Conservative	Resignation
Hyde	30 March 1916	Francis Neilson	Liberal	Thomas Jacobsen	Liberal	Resignation
Harborough	23 March 1916	John William Logan	Liberal	Percy Harris	Liberal	Resignation
South Shields	18 March 1916	Russell Rea	Liberal	Cecil Cochrane	Liberal	Death
Hertford	9 March 1916	Sir John Rolleston	Conservative	Noel Pemberton Billing	Independent	Resignation
Cockermouth	2 March 1916	Sir Wilfrid Lawson	Liberal	Joseph Bliss	Liberal	Resignation
Droitwich	29 February 1916	Hon. John Lyttelton	Conservative	Herbert Whiteley	Conservative	Resignation
Chester	29 February 1916	Robert Yerburgh	Conservative	Sir Owen Philipps	Conservative	Resignation
Bolton	29 February 1916	Thomas Taylor	Liberal	William Edge	Liberal	Resignation
South Tyrone	28 February 1916	Andrew Horner	Irish Unionist	William Coote	Irish Unionist	Death
North Louth	24 February 1916	Augustine Roche	Irish Parliamentary	Patrick Whitty	Irish Parliamentary	Death
Liverpool East Toxteth	21 February 1916	Edward Marshall Hall	Conservative	James Stuart Rankin	Conservative	Recorder of Guildford
Rotherham	26 January 1916	Joseph Pease	Liberal	Joseph Pease	Liberal	Postmaster-General
Mile End	25 January 1916	Hon. Harry Levy-Lawson	Conservative (Note: Levy-Lawson was elected as a Liberal Unionist. In 1912 the party merged with the Conservatives.)	Warwick Brookes	Conservative	Succession
Bradford Central	21 January 1916	Sir George Scott Robertson	Liberal	James Hill	Liberal	Death
Chesterton	20 January 1916	Edwin Montagu	Liberal	Edwin Montagu	Liberal	Chancellor of the Duchy of Lancaster
North West Staffordshire	17 January 1916	Albert Stanley	Labour	Samuel Finney	Labour	Death
Portsmouth	15 January 1916	Lord Charles Beresford	Conservative	Hon. Sir Hedworth Meux	Conservative	Elevation
St George, Hanover Square	11 January 1916	Sir Alexander Henderson	Conservative	Sir George Reid	Conservative	Elevation
Newington West	10 January 1916	Cecil Norton	Liberal	James Daniel Gilbert	Liberal	Elevation
Cleveland	9 December 1915	Herbert Samuel	Liberal	Herbert Samuel	Liberal	Chancellor of the Duchy of Lancaster
Tiverton	30 November 1915	Hon. William Walrond	Conservative	Charles Carew	Conservative	Died of wounds
Merthyr Tydfil	25 November 1915	Keir Hardie	Labour	Charles Stanton	Independent Labour	Death
St Austell	24 November 1915	Thomas Agar-Robartes	Liberal	Sir Francis Layland-Barratt	Liberal	Died of wounds
St Helens	24 November 1915	Rigby Swift	Conservative	Rigby Swift	Conservative	Recorder of Wigan
Kingston	16 November 1915	George Cave	Conservative	George Cave	Conservative	Solicitor General for England and Wales
Cardiff	12 November 1915	Lord Ninian Crichton-Stuart	Conservative	James Cory	Conservative	Killed in action
Uxbridge	10 November 1915	Hon. Charles Mills	Conservative	Hon. Arthur Mills	Conservative	Killed in action
Heywood	10 November 1915	Harold Cawley	Liberal	Albert Illingworth	Liberal	Killed in action
Appleby	27 October 1915	Sir Lancelot Sanderson	Conservative	Cecil Lowther	Conservative	High Court judge
Dublin Harbour	1 October 1915	William Abraham	Irish Parliamentary	Alfie Byrne	Irish Parliamentary	Death
Glasgow Central	16 July 1915	Charles Dickson	Conservative	John MacLeod	Conservative	Lord Justice Clerk
Arfon	6 July 1915	William Jones	Liberal	Griffith Rees	Liberal	Death
Keighley	29 June 1915	Sir Stanley Buckmaster	Liberal	Sir Swire Smith	Liberal	Appointed Lord Chancellor
North Tipperary	17 June 1915	Dr John Esmonde	Irish Parliamentary	Sir John Esmonde	Irish Parliamentary	Death
Dublin College Green	11 June 1915	Joseph Nannetti	Irish Parliamentary	John Dillon Nugent	Irish Parliamentary	Death
Preston	9 June 1915	Alfred Tobin	Conservative	Urban H. Broughton	Conservative	County Court judge
Kilmarnock Burghs	28 May 1915	Will Gladstone	Liberal	Hon. Alexander Shaw	Liberal	Killed in action
Mid Durham	29 April 1915	John Wilson	Liberal	Samuel Galbraith	Liberal	Death
Carmarthen Boroughs	17 March 1915	W. Llewelyn Williams	Liberal	W. Llewelyn Williams	Liberal	Recorder of Cardiff
Maidstone	22 February 1915	Charles Vane-Tempest-Stewart	Conservative	Carlyon Bellairs	Conservative	Succession
Mid Antrim	17 February 1915	Hon. Arthur O'Neill	Irish Unionist	Hon. Hugh O'Neill	Irish Unionist	Killed in action
Liverpool Kirkdale	15 February 1915	Gerald Kyffin-Taylor	Conservative	De Fonblanque Pennefather	Conservative	Resignation
Saffron Walden	13 February 1915	Cecil Beck	Liberal	Cecil Beck	Liberal	Commissioner of the Treasury
Chesterton	13 February 1915	Edwin Montagu	Liberal	Edwin Montagu	Liberal	Chancellor of the Duchy of Lancaster
Wigtownshire	12 February 1915	John Dalrymple	Conservative	Hon. Hew Dalrymple	Conservative	Succession
Thirsk and Malton	12 February 1915	Charles Duncombe	Conservative	Edmund Turton	Conservative	Succession
Howdenshire	10 February 1915	Henry Harrison-Broadley	Conservative	Hon. Stanley Jackson	Conservative	Death
Shipley	9 February 1915	Percy Illingworth	Liberal	Oswald Partington	Liberal	Death (food poisoning)
Scarborough	9 February 1915	Walter Rea	Liberal	Walter Rea	Liberal	Commissioner of the Treasury
Swansea District	6 February 1915	David Brynmor Jones	Liberal	Jeremiah Williams	Liberal	Master in Lunacy
Norwich	6 February 1915	Sir Frederick Low	Liberal	Hilton Young	Liberal	High Court judge
Sheffield Attercliffe	28 December 1914	Joseph Pointer	Labour	William Crawford Anderson	Labour	Death
Tullamore	8 December 1914	Edmund Haviland-Burke	Irish Parliamentary	Edward John Graham	Ind. Nationalist	Death
East Galway	4 December 1914	John Roche	Irish Parliamentary	James Cosgrave	Irish Parliamentary	Death
Londonderry City	30 November 1914	David Hogg	Liberal	Sir James Dougherty	Liberal	Death
The Hartlepools	22 September 1914	Sir Stephen Furness	Liberal	Sir Walter Runciman	Liberal	Death
Bolton	22 September 1914	Alfred Gill	Labour	Robert Tootill	Labour	Death
West Wicklow	20 August 1914	Edward Peter O'Kelly	Irish Parliamentary	John Thomas Donovan	Irish Parliamentary	Death
Swansea District	13 August 1914	Sir David Brynmor Jones	Liberal	Sir David Brynmor Jones	Liberal	Recorder of Cardiff
=== 30th Parliament (December 1910 – July 1914) ===
By-election	Date	Incumbent	Party	Winner	Party	Cause
North Galway	21 July 1914	Richard Hazleton	Irish Parliamentary	Richard Hazleton	Irish Parliamentary	Seeks re-election (Note: Hazleton resigned after submitting his own bankruptcy petition.)
East Worcestershire	16 July 1914	Austen Chamberlain	Conservative	Leverton Harris	Conservative	Resignation in order to fight Birmingham West
Birmingham West	14 July 1914	Joseph Chamberlain	Conservative	Austen Chamberlain	Conservative	Death
Oxford University	30 June 1914	Sir William Anson	Conservative	Rowland Prothero	Conservative	Death
Brighton	29 June 1914	Hon. John Gordon	Conservative	Charles Thomas-Stanford	Conservative	Resignation
Ipswich	23 May 1914	Silvester Horne	Liberal	John Ganzoni	Conservative	Death
North East Derbyshire	20 May 1914	W. E. Harvey	Labour	Harland Bowden	Conservative	Death
Great Grimsby	12 May 1914	Sir George Doughty	Conservative	Thomas Tickler	Conservative	Death
East Fife	8 April 1914	H. H. Asquith	Liberal	H. H. Asquith	Liberal	Secretary of State for War
Belfast East	6 April 1914	R. J. McMordie	Irish Unionist	Robert Sharman-Crawford	Irish Unionist	Death
Leith Burghs	26 February 1914	Ronald Munro-Ferguson	Liberal	George Welsh Currie	Conservative	Governor General of Australia
Poplar	19 February 1914	Sydney Buxton	Liberal	Alfred William Yeo	Liberal	Governor-General of the Union of South Africa
Bethnal Green South West	19 February 1914	Charles Masterman	Liberal	Mathew Wilson	Conservative	Chancellor of the Duchy of Lancaster
Cork City	18 February 1914	William O'Brien	All-for-Ireland	William O'Brien	All-for-Ireland	Resigned to re-contest
Wycombe	18 February 1914	Sir Charles Cripps	Conservative	William Baring du Pré	Conservative	Elevation
North West Durham	30 January 1914	Llewellyn Atherley-Jones	Liberal	Aneurin Williams	Liberal	Judge of the City of London Court
South Lanarkshire	12 December 1913	Sir Walter Menzies	Liberal	Hon. William Watson	Conservative	Death
Wick Burghs	8 December 1913	Robert Munro	Liberal	Robert Munro	Liberal	Lord Advocate
Keighley	11 November 1913	Sir Stanley Buckmaster	Liberal	Sir Stanley Buckmaster	Liberal	Solicitor General for England and Wales
Reading	8 November 1913	Sir Rufus Isaacs	Liberal	Leslie Orme Wilson	Conservative	Lord Chief Justice of England and Wales
Linlithgowshire	7 November 1913	Alexander Ure	Liberal	John Pratt	Liberal	Lord President of the Court of Session
North Cork	4 November 1913	Patrick Guiney	All-for-Ireland	John Guiney	All-for-Ireland	Death
Chesterfield	20 August 1913	James Haslam	Labour	Barnet Kenyon	Liberal	Death
St George's, Hanover Square	15 July 1913	Alfred Lyttelton	Conservative	Sir Alexander Henderson	Conservative	Death
Leicester	27 June 1913	Eliot Crawshay-Williams	Liberal	Gordon Hewart	Liberal	Resignation
Dover	23 June 1913	George Wyndham	Conservative	Vere Ponsonby	Conservative	Death
Wandsworth	12 June 1913	Sir Henry Kimber	Conservative	Samuel Samuel	Conservative	Resignation
Leix	9 June 1913	Patrick Aloysius Meehan	Irish Parliamentary	Patrick Joseph Meehan	Irish Parliamentary	Death
Altrincham	28 May 1913	John Kebty-Fletcher	Conservative	George Hamilton	Conservative	Resignation
Newmarket	16 May 1913	Sir Charles Rose	Liberal	John Denison-Pender	Conservative	Death
Whitechapel	30 April 1913	Sir Stuart Samuel	Liberal	Sir Stuart Samuel	Liberal	Undertook a contract for the Public Service
Shrewsbury	22 April 1913	Sir Clement Hill	Conservative	George Butler Lloyd	Conservative	Death
Kendal	18 March 1913	Sir Josceline Bagot	Conservative	John Weston	Ind. Conservative	Death
Houghton-le-Spring	18 March 1913	Robert Cameron	Liberal	Thomas Wing	Liberal	Death
Chorley	19 February 1913	David Lindsay	Conservative	Sir Henry Hibbert	Conservative	Succession
East Antrim	19 February 1913	James McCalmont	Irish Unionist	Robert McCalmont	Irish Unionist	Death
East Waterford	15 February 1913	Patrick Joseph Power	Irish Parliamentary	Martin Joseph Murphy	Irish Parliamentary	Death
Londonderry City	30 January 1913	James Hamilton	Irish Unionist	David Hogg	Liberal	Succession
Flint Boroughs	21 January 1913	James Summers	Liberal	Thomas Henry Parry	Liberal	Death
Bow and Bromley	26 November 1912	George Lansbury	Labour	Reginald Blair	Conservative	Resigned to recontest on platform of women's suffrage
Bolton	23 November 1912	George Harwood	Liberal	Thomas Taylor	Liberal	Death
Taunton	11 November 1912	Hon. William Peel	Conservative	Sir Gilbert Wills	Conservative	Succession
Midlothian	10 September 1912	Alexander Murray	Liberal	John Hope	Conservative	Succession
East Carmarthenshire	22 August 1912	Abel Thomas	Liberal	Rev Towyn Jones	Liberal	Death
Manchester North West	8 August 1912	Sir George Kemp	Liberal	Sir John Randles	Conservative	Resignation
Crewe	26 July 1912	Walter McLaren	Liberal	Ernest Craig	Conservative	Death
Hanley	13 July 1912	Enoch Edwards	Labour	R. L. Outhwaite	Liberal	Death
Ilkeston	1 July 1912	J. E. B. Seely	Liberal	J. E. B. Seely	Liberal	Secretary of State for War
Holmfirth	20 June 1912	Henry Wilson	Liberal	Sydney Arnold	Liberal	Resignation
Hythe	11 June 1912	Sir Edward Sassoon	Conservative	Sir Philip Sassoon	Conservative	Death
North West Norfolk	31 May 1912	Sir George White	Liberal	Edward Hemmerde	Liberal	Death
Hackney South	24 May 1912	Horatio Bottomley	Independent Liberal	Hector Morison	Liberal	Resignation
Forest of Dean	30 April 1912	Henry Webb	Liberal	Henry Webb	Liberal	Commissioner of the Treasury
Nottingham East	19 April 1912	James Morrison	Conservative	Sir John David Rees	Conservative	Resignation
Epsom	21 March 1912	William Keswick	Conservative	Henry Keswick	Conservative	Death
Leominster	18 March 1912	Sir James Rankin	Conservative	H. FitzHerbert Wright	Conservative	Resignation
South East Essex	16 March 1912	John Kirkwood	Conservative	Hon. Rupert Guinness	Conservative	Resignation
Hereford	8 March 1912	John Arkwright	Conservative	William Hewins	Conservative	Resignation
Manchester South	5 March 1912	Sir Arthur Haworth	Liberal	Philip Glazebrook	Conservative	Commissioner of the Treasury
Glasgow St Rollox	26 February 1912	Thomas McKinnon Wood	Liberal	Thomas McKinnon Wood	Liberal	Secretary for Scotland
Edinburgh East	2 February 1912	Sir James Gibson	Liberal	James Hogge	Liberal	Death
Carmarthen District	29 January 1912	W. Llewelyn Williams	Liberal	W. Llewelyn Williams	Liberal	Recorder of Swansea
Govan	22 December 1911	William Hunter	Liberal	Daniel Holmes	Liberal	Senator of the College of Justice
North Ayrshire	20 December 1911	Andrew Anderson	Liberal	Duncan Campbell	Conservative	Solicitor General for Scotland
Hitchin	23 November 1911	Dr Alfred Hillier	Conservative	Robert Cecil	Conservative	Death
South Somerset	21 November 1911	Sir Edward Strachey	Liberal	Aubrey Herbert	Conservative	Elevation
Oldham	13 November 1911	Alfred Emmott	Liberal	Edmund Denniss	Conservative	Elevation
Bristol East	3 November 1911	Charles Hobhouse	Liberal	Charles Hobhouse	Liberal	Chancellor of the Duchy of Lancaster
Keighley	27 October 1911	Sir John Brigg	Liberal	Stanley Buckmaster	Liberal	Death
North Tyrone	6 October 1911	Redmond Barry	Liberal	Thomas Russell	Liberal	Lord Chancellor of Ireland
Kilmarnock Burghs	26 September 1911	Adam Rainy	Liberal	Will Gladstone	Liberal	Death
Middleton	2 August 1911	Sir William Adkins	Liberal	Sir William Adkins	Liberal	Recorder of Nottingham
Bethnal Green South West	29 July 1911	Edward Pickersgill	Liberal	Charles Masterman	Liberal	Resignation
Wellington	21 July 1911	Sir Alexander Acland Hood	Conservative	Dennis Boles	Conservative	Elevation
Luton	20 July 1911	Thomas Ashton	Liberal	Cecil Harmsworth	Liberal	Elevation
East Cork	15 July 1911	Anthony Donelan	Irish Parliamentary	John Muldoon	Irish Parliamentary	Election declared void
North East Cork	15 July 1911	Moreton Frewen	All-for-Ireland	Tim Healy	All-for-Ireland	Resignation
East Wicklow	13 July 1911	John Muldoon	Irish Parliamentary	Anthony Donelan	Irish Parliamentary	Resignation in order to contest East Cork
West Ham North	8 July 1911	Charles Masterman	Liberal	Baron Maurice de Forest	Liberal	Election declared void
St Augustine's	7 July 1911	Aretas Akers-Douglas	Conservative	Ronald McNeill	Conservative	Elevation
Glasgow Tradeston	6 July 1911	Archibald Corbett	Liberal	J. D. White	Liberal	Elevation
Kingston upon Hull Central	5 July 1911	Sir Henry King	Conservative	Mark Sykes	Conservative	Election declared void
Brighton	26 June 1911	Hon. Walter Rice	Conservative	Hon. John Gordon	Conservative	Succession
Ross and Cromarty	14 June 1911	James Galloway Weir	Liberal	Ian Macpherson	Liberal	Death
Barnstaple	6 May 1911	Ernest Soares	Liberal	Sir Godfrey Baring	Liberal	Appointed to the National Debt Office
Birmingham South	3 May 1911	Charles Howard	Conservative	Leo Amery	Liberal Unionist	Succession
East Dorset	29 April 1911	Hon. Frederick Guest	Liberal	Hon. Frederick Guest	Liberal	Commissioner of the Treasury
Cheltenham	28 April 1911	Richard Mathias	Liberal	James Agg-Gardner	Conservative	Election declared void
Haddingtonshire	19 April 1911	Sir Richard Haldane	Liberal	John Deans Hope	Liberal	Appointed Lord Chancellor
Bootle	27 March 1911	Thomas Sandys	Conservative	Bonar Law	Conservative	Resignation
Brentford	23 March 1911	Lord Alwyne Compton	Conservative	William Joynson-Hicks	Conservative	Resignation
North Louth	15 March 1911	Richard Hazleton	Irish Parliamentary	Augustine Roche	Irish Parliamentary	Void Election
North East Lanarkshire	9 March 1911	Thomas Fleming Wilson	Liberal	James Duncan Millar	Liberal	Resignation
Forest of Dean	24 February 1911	Sir Charles Dilke	Liberal	Henry Webb	Liberal	Death
Westbury	22 February 1911	Sir John Fuller	Liberal	Hon. Geoffrey Howard	Liberal	Resignation
Horncastle	16 February 1911	Lord Willoughby de Eresby	Conservative	William Weigall	Conservative	Succession
Cambridge University	11–16 February 1911	Samuel Butcher	Conservative	Sir Joseph Larmor	Conservative	Death
Arfon	11 February 1911	William Jones	Liberal	William Jones	Liberal	Commissioner of the Treasury
=== 29th Parliament (January 1910 – December 1910) ===
By-election	Date	Incumbent	Party	Winner	Party	Cause
Walthamstow	1 November 1910	John Simon	Liberal	Sir John Simon	Liberal	Solicitor General for England and Wales (Note: Seat vacated on appointment to the office noted.)
South Shields	27 October 1910	Sir William Robson	Liberal	Russell Rea	Liberal	Lord of Appeal
Liverpool Kirkdale	20 July 1910	Charles McArthur	Conservative	Gerald Kyffin-Taylor	Conservative	Death
East Dorset	30 June 1910	Frederick Guest	Liberal	Henry Guest	Liberal	Election declared void
Hartlepool	20 June 1910	Sir Christopher Furness	Liberal	Stephen Furness	Liberal	Election declared void
Lewes	17 June 1910 (Note: An uncontested by-election.)	Sir Henry Aubrey-Fletcher	Conservative	William Campion	Conservative	Death
Dublin Harbour	14 June 1910	Timothy Harrington	Irish Parliamentary	William Abraham	Irish Parliamentary	Death
Crewe	30 April 1910	James Tomkinson	Liberal	Walter McLaren	Liberal	Death
Edinburgh South	29 April 1910	Arthur Dewar	Liberal	Charles Lyell	Liberal	Senator of the College of Justice
North Down	28 April 1910	Thomas Corbett	Conservative	William Mitchell-Thomson	Conservative	Death
Govan	28 April 1910	William Hunter	Liberal	William Hunter	Liberal	Solicitor General for Scotland
Mid Glamorganshire	31 March 1910	Sir Samuel Evans	Liberal	Frederick Gibbins	Liberal	President of the Probate and Divorce Division of the High Court of Justice
West Wicklow	29 March 1910	James O'Connor	Irish Parliamentary	Edward Peter O'Kelly	Irish Parliamentary	Death
Reading	12 March 1910	Rufus Isaacs	Liberal	Rufus Isaacs	Liberal	Solicitor General for England and Wales
Shipley	10 March 1910	Percy Illingworth	Liberal	Percy Illingworth	Liberal	Commissioner of the Treasury
Ilkeston	7 March 1910	Balthazar Foster	Liberal	J. E. B. Seely	Liberal	Resignation
North East Cork	2 March 1910	William O'Brien	All-for-Ireland	Maurice Healy	All-for-Ireland	Elected to sit for Cork City
Barnstaple	2 March 1910	Ernest Soares	Liberal	Ernest Soares	Liberal	Commissioner of the Treasury
Rotherham	1 March 1910	Sir William Holland	Liberal	Jack Pease	Liberal	Resignation
Tower Hamlets St George	1 March 1910	William Wedgwood Benn	Liberal	William Wedgwood Benn	Liberal	Commissioner of the Treasury
Swansea District	28 February 1910	Sir David Brynmor Jones	Liberal	Sir David Brynmor Jones	Liberal	Recorder of Merthyr Tydvil
=== 28th Parliament (1906 – January 1910) ===
By-election	Date	Incumbent	Party	Winner	Party	Cause
South Armagh	5 November 1909	William McKillop	Irish Parliamentary	Charles O'Neill	Irish Parliamentary	Death
Bermondsey	28 October 1909	George Cooper	Liberal	John Dumphreys	Conservative	Death
West Clare	3 September 1909 (Note: An uncontested by-election.)	James Halpin	Irish Parliamentary	Arthur Lynch	Irish Parliamentary	Death
South Kilkenny	10 August 1909	Nicholas Joseph Murphy	Irish Parliamentary	Matthew Keating	Irish Parliamentary	Declared bankrupt
North Sligo	5 August 1909	P. A. McHugh	Irish Parliamentary	Thomas Scanlan	Irish Parliamentary	Death
High Peak	22 July 1909	Oswald Partington	Liberal	Oswald Partington	Liberal	Junior Lord of the Treasury (Note: Seat vacated on appointment to the office noted.)
Dumfries Burghs	20 July 1909	John Gulland	Liberal	John Gulland	Liberal	Junior Lord of the Treasury
Mid Derbyshire	15 July 1909	James Alfred Jacoby	Liberal	John Hancock	Liberal	Death
Cleveland	9 July 1909	Herbert Samuel	Liberal	Herbert Samuel	Liberal	Chancellor of the Duchy of Lancaster
East Limerick	10 June 1909	William Lundon	Irish Parliamentary	Thomas Lundon	Irish Parliamentary	Death
Edinburgh West	17 May 1909	Lewis McIver	Liberal Unionist	James Avon Clyde	Liberal Unionist	Resignation
Stratford-on-Avon	4 May 1909	Thomas Kincaid-Smith	Liberal	Philip Foster	Conservative	Resigned to restand following his resignation from the Liberal Party
Sheffield Attercliffe	4 May 1909	J. Batty Langley	Liberal	Joseph Pointer	Labour	Resignation
Cork City	1 May 1909	William O'Brien	Irish Parliamentary	Maurice Healy	All-for-Ireland	Resignation
Edinburgh East	16 April 1909	George McCrae	Liberal	James Gibson	Liberal	Resignation
East Denbighshire	2 April 1909	Edward Hemmerde	Liberal	Edward Hemmerde	Liberal	Recorder of Liverpool
Croydon	29 March 1909	H. O. Arnold-Forster	Liberal Unionist	Robert Hermon-Hodge	Conservative	Death
Hawick Burghs	5 March 1909	Thomas Shaw	Liberal	John Barran	Liberal	Resignation (appointed Lord of Appeal in Ordinary)
Edinburgh South	4 March 1909	Arthur Dewar	Liberal	Arthur Dewar	Liberal	Solicitor General for Scotland
Glasgow Central	2 March 1909	Andrew Mitchell Torrance	Liberal	Charles Dickson	Conservative	Death
Forfarshire	27 February 1909	John Sinclair	Liberal	James Falconer	Liberal	Elevation to the peerage
Taunton	23 February 1909	Edward Boyle	Conservative	William Peel	Conservative	Resignation
Tamworth	16 January 1909	Sir Philip Muntz	Conservative	Francis Newdegate	Conservative	Death
Chelmsford	1 December 1908	Carne Rasch	Conservative	E. G. Pretyman	Conservative	Resignation
Newcastle-upon-Tyne	25 September 1908	Thomas Cairns	Liberal	George Renwick	Conservative	Death
Haggerston	1 August 1908	Randal Cremer	Lib-Lab	Rupert Guinness	Conservative	Death
Pembrokeshire	16 July 1908	John Philipps	Liberal	Walter Roch	Liberal	Elevation to the peerage
Pudsey	20 June 1908	George Whiteley	Liberal	John James Oddy	Conservative	Resignation
Stirling Burghs	22 May 1908	Henry Campbell-Bannerman	Liberal	Arthur Ponsonby	Liberal	Death
Newport (Shropshire)	14 May 1908	William Kenyon-Slaney	Conservative	Beville Stanier	Conservative	Death
Montrose Burghs	12 May 1908	John Morley	Liberal	Robert Harcourt	Liberal	Elevation to the peerage
Dundee	9 May 1908	Edmund Robertson	Liberal	Winston Churchill	Liberal	Elevation to the peerage
Wolverhampton East	5 May 1908	Henry Fowler	Liberal	George Thorne	Liberal	Elevation to the peerage
Kincardineshire	25 April 1908	John William Crombie	Liberal	Arthur Murray	Liberal	Death
Manchester North West	24 April 1908	Winston Churchill	Liberal	William Joynson-Hicks	Conservative	Appointed President of the Board of Trade
Dewsbury	23 April 1908	Walter Runciman	Liberal	Walter Runciman	Liberal	President of the Board of Education
Sheffield Central	21 April 1908	Howard Vincent	Conservative	James Hope	Conservative	Death
West Derbyshire	15 April 1908	Victor Cavendish	Liberal Unionist	Henry Petty-Fitzmaurice	Liberal Unionist	Succession to the peerage
Peckham	24 March 1908	Charles Clarke	Liberal	Harry Gooch	Conservative	Death
West Down	20 March 1908	Arthur Hill	Irish Unionist	William MacCaw	Irish Unionist	Resignation
Hastings	3 March 1908	Harvey du Cros	Conservative	Arthur du Cros	Conservative	Resignation
Bewdley	29 February 1908	Alfred Baldwin	Conservative	Stanley Baldwin	Conservative	Death
West Carmarthenshire	26 February 1908	John Lloyd Morgan	Liberal	John Lloyd Morgan	Liberal	Recorder of Swansea
North Leitrim	21 February 1908	Charles Dolan	Irish Parliamentary	Francis Meehan	Irish Parliamentary	Resignation
Leeds South	13 February 1908	John Lawson Walton	Liberal	William Middlebrook	Liberal	Death
Mid Glamorganshire	7 February 1908	Samuel Evans	Liberal	Samuel Evans	Liberal	Solicitor General for England and Wales
Worcester	7 February 1908	George Henry Williamson	Conservative	Edward Goulding	Conservative	Void election
St Austell	5 February 1908	William Alexander McArthur	Liberal	Thomas Agar-Robartes	Liberal	Resignation
County Carlow	3 February 1908	John Hammond	Irish Parliamentary	Walter Kavanagh	Irish Parliamentary	Death
Ross	31 January 1908	Alan Coulston Gardner	Liberal	Percy Clive	Conservative	Death
Ashburton	17 January 1908	Harry Eve	Liberal	Ernest Morrison-Bell	Liberal Unionist	Appointment as a judge
Kingston upon Hull West	29 November 1907	Charles Wilson	Liberal	Guy Wilson	Liberal	Succession to peerage
Liverpool Kirkdale	27 September 1907	David MacIver	Conservative	Charles McArthur	Conservative	Death
South Longford	6 September 1907	Edward Blake	Irish Parliamentary	John Phillips	Irish Parliamentary	Resignation
West Down	6 September 1907	Harry Liddell	Irish Unionist	Arthur Hill	Irish Unionist	Resignation
Bury St Edmunds	24 August 1907	Frederick Hervey	Conservative	Walter Guinness	Conservative	Succession to the peerage
Anglesey	21 August 1907	Ellis Griffith	Liberal	Ellis Griffith	Liberal	Recorder of Birkenhead
North West Staffordshire	31 July 1907	Alfred Billson	Liberal	Albert Stanley	Lib-Lab	Death
East Wicklow	29 July 1907	Denis Joseph Cogan	Irish Parliamentary	John Muldoon	Irish Parliamentary	Resignation
South Kilkenny	29 July 1907	James O'Mara	Irish Parliamentary	Nicholas Joseph Murphy	Irish Parliamentary	Resignation
Colne Valley	18 July 1907	James Kitson	Liberal	Victor Grayson	Colne Valley Labour Union	Elevation to the peerage
Jarrow	4 July 1907	Charles Palmer	Liberal	Pete Curran	Labour	Death
North Monaghan	20 June 1907	Patrick O'Hare	Irish Parliamentary	James Lardner	Irish Parliamentary	Resignation
Rutlandshire	11 June 1907	George Finch	Conservative	John Gretton	Conservative	Death
Hornsey	5 June 1907	Charles Balfour	Conservative	Lawrence Dundas	Conservative	Resignation
Wimbledon	14 May 1907	Eric Hambro	Conservative	Henry Chaplin	Conservative	Resignation
Stepney	10 May 1907	William Evans-Gordon	Conservative	Leverton Harris	Conservative	Resignation
North Belfast	17 April 1907	Daniel Dixon	Irish Unionist	George Clark	Irish Unionist	Death
South Westmeath	13 April 1907	Donal Sullivan	Irish Parliamentary	Walter Nugent	Irish Parliamentary	Death
Hexham	27 March 1907	Wentworth Beaumont	Liberal	Richard Durning Holt	Liberal	Succession to the peerage
North Tyrone	8 March 1907	William Huston Dodd	Liberal	Redmond Barry	Liberal	Appointed as a Judge
Halifax	6 March 1907	John Henry Whitley	Liberal	John Henry Whitley	Liberal	Junior Lord of the Treasury
Brigg	26 February 1907	Harold Reckitt	Liberal	Berkeley Sheffield	Conservative	Resignation
Aberdeen South	20 February 1907	James Bryce	Liberal	George Esslemont	Liberal	Appointed British Ambassador to the United States
North Monmouthshire	19 February 1907	Reginald McKenna	Liberal	Reginald McKenna	Liberal	President of the Board of Education
Banffshire	16 February 1907	Alexander William Black	Liberal	Walter Waring	Liberal	Death
Perth	12 February 1907	Robert Wallace	Liberal	Robert Pullar	Liberal	Resignation
North East Derbyshire	30 January 1907	Thomas Bolton	Liberal	W. E. Harvey	Lib-Lab	Death
Mid Cork	31 December 1906	D. D. Sheehan	Irish Parliamentary	D. D. Sheehan	Independent Labour	Resigned following expulsion from Nationalist group
Huddersfield	28 November 1906	James Woodhouse	Liberal	Arthur Sherwell	Liberal	Appointed Rail and Canal Traffic Commissioner
North Armagh	16 November 1906	Edward James Saunderson	Irish Unionist	William Moore	Irish Unionist	Death
Galway Borough	3 November 1906	Charles Ramsay Devlin	Irish Parliamentary	Stephen Gwynn	Irish Parliamentary	Resignation
Mid Glamorganshire	8 October 1906	Samuel Evans	Liberal	Samuel Evans	Liberal	Recorder of Swansea
East Denbighshire	14 August 1906	Samuel Moss	Liberal	Edward Hemmerde	Liberal	Resignation
Cockermouth	3 August 1906	Sir Wilfrid Lawson	Liberal	Sir John Scurrah Randles	Conservative	Death
East Tyrone	5 July 1906	Patrick Doogan	Irish Parliamentary	Tom Kettle	Irish Parliamentary	Death
Bodmin	24 July 1906	Hon. Thomas Agar-Robartes	Liberal	Freeman Freeman-Thomas	Liberal	Unseated on petition
St George's, Hanover Square	15 June 1906	Heneage Legge	Conservative	Alfred Lyttelton	Liberal Unionist	Resignation
City of London	15 June 1906	Sir Edward Clarke	Conservative	Frederick Banbury	Conservative	Resignation
Eifion	5 June 1906	John Bryn Roberts	Liberal	Ellis William Davies	Liberal	Resignation
Dulwich	15 May 1906	Frederick Rutherfoord Harris	Conservative	Bonar Law	Conservative	Went abroad
Eye	6 April 1906	Francis Seymour Stevenson	Liberal	Harold Pearson	Liberal	Resignation
Leicester	30 March 1906	Henry Broadhurst	Liberal	Franklin Thomasson	Liberal	Resignation
Basingstoke	12 March 1906	Arthur Frederick Jeffreys	Conservative	Arthur Salter	Conservative	Death
North Kilkenny	3 March 1906	Joseph Devlin	Irish Parliamentary	Michael Meagher	Irish Parliamentary	Double election, chose to sit for Belfast West
North Leitrim	28 February 1906	P. A. McHugh	Irish Parliamentary	Charles Dolan	Irish Parliamentary	Double election, chose to sit for North Sligo
North Galway	28 February 1906	Thomas Higgins	Irish Parliamentary	Richard Hazleton	Irish Parliamentary	Death
East Aberdeenshire	28 February 1906	James Annand	Liberal	James Murray	Liberal	Death
City of London	27 February 1906	Alban Gibbs	Conservative	Arthur Balfour	Conservative	Retired in favour of Balfour
Westbury	26 February 1906	John Fuller	Liberal	John Fuller	Liberal	Appointed a Lord Commissioner of the Treasury
=== 27th Parliament (1900–1906) ===
By-election	Date	Incumbent	Party	Winner	Party	Cause
New Forest	6 December 1905	John Douglas-Scott-Montagu	Conservative	Henry Francis Compton	Conservative	Succession to peerage
Normanton	27 November 1905 (Note: An uncontested by-election.)	William Parrott	Lib-Lab	Frederick Hall	Lib-Lab	Death
Hampstead	26 October 1905	Thomas Milvain	Conservative	John Fletcher	Conservative	Judge Advocate General (Note: Seat vacated on appointment to the office noted.)
Barkston Ash (Note: Gain not retained at the 1906 general election.)	13 October 1905	Sir Robert Gunter	Conservative	Joseph Andrews	Liberal	Death
Belfast North	14 September 1905	Sir James Horner Haslett	Irish Unionist	Sir Daniel Dixon	Irish Unionist	Death
Elgin Burghs	8 September 1905	Alexander Asher	Liberal	John Sutherland	Liberal	Death
Carlisle	14 July 1905	William Gully	Liberal	Frederick Chance	Liberal	Elevation to the peerage
West Down	10 July 1905	Arthur Hill	Irish Unionist	Harry Liddell	Irish Unionist	Resignation
Kingswinford	3 July 1905	William George Webb	Conservative	Henry Staveley-Hill	Conservative	Death
Finsbury East (Note: Gain retained at the 1906 general election.)	29 June 1905	Henry Charles Richards	Conservative	Allen Baker	Liberal	Death
North Donegal	15 June 1905	William O'Doherty	Irish Parliamentary	John Muldoon	Irish Parliamentary	Death
Cork City	14 June 1905	J. F. X. O'Brien	Irish Parliamentary	Augustine Roche	Irish Parliamentary	Death
Chichester	2 June 1905	Lord Edmund Talbot	Conservative	Lord Edmund Talbot	Conservative	Lord Commissioner of the Treasury
Whitby	1 June 1905	Ernest Beckett	Conservative	Noel Buxton	Liberal	Succession to peerage
Brighton	5 April 1905	Gerald Loder	Conservative	Ernest Villiers	Liberal	Lord Commissioner of the Treasury
Bute	3 March 1905	Andrew Murray	Conservative	Norman Lamont	Liberal	Resignation
Appleby	2 March 1905	Richard Rigg	Liberal	Leifchild Jones	Liberal	Resignation
Liverpool Everton	22 February 1905	John A. Willox	Conservative	John Harmood-Banner	Conservative	Resignation
North Kildare	14 February 1905	Edmund Leamy	Irish Parliamentary	John O'Connor	Irish Parliamentary	Death
North Dorset	26 January 1905	John Wingfield-Digby	Conservative	Arthur Walters Wills	Liberal	Death
Mile End	12 January 1905	Spencer Charrington	Conservative	Harry Levy-Lawson	Liberal Unionist	Death
Stalybridge	7 January 1905	Matthew White Ridley	Conservative	John Frederick Cheetham	Liberal	Succession to peerage
Horsham	11 November 1904	John Heywood Johnstone	Conservative	Edward Turnour	Conservative	Death
West Monmouthshire	3 November 1904	Sir William Harcourt	Liberal	Thomas Richards	Lib-Lab	Death
Isle of Thanet	7 October 1904	James Lowther	Conservative	Harry Marks	Conservative	Death
Cork City	19 August 1904	William O'Brien	Irish Parliamentary	William O'Brien	Irish Parliamentary	Resignation
North East Lanarkshire	10 August 1904	William Rattigan	Liberal Unionist	Alexander Findlay	Liberal	Death
Reading	6 August 1904	George William Palmer	Liberal	Rufus Isaacs	Liberal	Resignation
Oswestry	26 July 1904	George Ormsby-Gore	Conservative	Allan Heywood Bright	Liberal	Succession to peerage
Chertsey	6 July 1904	John Arthur Fyler	Conservative	Lord Bingham	Conservative	Resignation
Sowerby	2 July 1904	John William Mellor	Liberal	John Sharp Higham	Liberal	Resignation
Devonport	20 June 1904	John Lockie	Conservative	John Benn	Liberal	Resignation
Harborough	17 June 1904	John William Logan	Liberal	Philip Stanhope	Liberal	Resignation
West Cavan	11 June 1904	Thomas McGovern	Irish Parliamentary	Vincent Kennedy	Irish Parliamentary	Death
Isle of Wight	6 April 1904	J. E. B. Seely	Conservative	J. E. B. Seely	Ind. Conservative	Resignation on leaving party
Dublin St Stephen's Green	21 March 1904	James McCann	Irish Parliamentary	Laurence Ambrose Waldron	Irish Parliamentary	Death
East Dorset	16 March 1904	Humphrey Sturt	Conservative	Charles Lyell	Liberal	Succession to peerage
Rossendale	15 March 1904	Sir William Mather	Liberal	Lewis Harcourt	Liberal	Resignation
Normanton	1 March 1904	Benjamin Pickard	Lib-Lab	William Parrott	Lib-Lab	Death
Birmingham South	26 February 1904	Joseph Powell Williams	Liberal Unionist	Charles Howard	Liberal Unionist	Death
St Albans	12 February 1904	Vicary Gibbs	Conservative	John Bamford Slack	Liberal	Disqualification for undertaking an Admiralty contract
City of London	9 February 1904	Alban Gibbs	Conservative	Alban Gibbs	Conservative	Disqualification for undertaking an Admiralty contract
Ayr Burghs	30 January 1904	Charles Lindsay Orr-Ewing	Conservative	Joseph Dobbie	Liberal	Death
Gateshead	20 January 1904	William Allan	Liberal	John Johnson	Lib-Lab	Death
Norwich	15 January 1904	Harry Bullard	Conservative	Louis Tillett	Liberal	Death
Ashburton	7 January 1904	Charles Seale-Hayne	Liberal	Harry Eve	Liberal	Death
Ludlow	22 December 1903	Jasper More	Liberal Unionist	Rowland Hunt	Liberal Unionist	Death
Lewisham	15 December 1903	John Penn	Conservative	Major Edward Coates	Conservative	Death
Dulwich	15 December 1903	Sir John Blundell Maple	Conservative	Frederick Rutherfoord Harris	Conservative	Death
Chorley	4 November 1903	Lord Balcarres	Conservative	Lord Balcarres	Conservative	Lord Commissioner of the Treasury
Fareham	28 October 1903	Arthur Lee	Conservative	Arthur Lee	Conservative	Civil Lord of the Admiralty
Westhoughton	24 October 1903	Lord Stanley	Conservative	Lord Stanley	Conservative	Postmaster General
Warwick and Leamington	23 October 1903	Alfred Lyttelton	Liberal Unionist	Alfred Lyttelton	Liberal Unionist	Secretary of State for the Colonies
Belfast West	23 October 1903	H. O. Arnold-Forster	Liberal Unionist	H. O. Arnold-Forster	Liberal Unionist	Secretary of State for War
South Meath	9 October 1903	James Laurence Carew	Ind. Nationalist	David Sheehy	Irish Parliamentary	Death
Londonderry	8 October 1903	James Hamilton	Irish Unionist	James Hamilton	Irish Unionist	Treasurer of the Household
North Leitrim	3 October 1903	P. A. McHugh	Irish Parliamentary	P. A. McHugh	Irish Parliamentary	Bankruptcy
Rochester	22 September 1903	James Gascoyne-Cecil	Conservative	Charles Tuff	Conservative	Succession to peerage
St Andrews Burghs	17 September 1903	Henry Torrens Anstruther	Liberal Unionist	Edward Charles Ellice	Liberal	Resignation
Argyllshire	26 August 1903	Donald Ninian Nicol	Conservative	John Ainsworth	Liberal	Death
Barnard Castle	24 July 1903	Joseph Pease	Liberal	Arthur Henderson	Labour Repr. Cmte. (Note: The Labour Representation Committee formally changed its name to the Labour Party in 1906.)	Death
South Kildare	23 May 1903	Matthew Minch	Irish Parliamentary	Denis Kilbride	Irish Parliamentary	Resignation
Preston	14 May 1903	Robert William Hanbury	Conservative	John Kerr	Conservative	Death
Camborne	8 April 1903	William Sproston Caine	Liberal	Wilfrid Lawson	Liberal	Death
Chertsey	26 March 1903	Henry Leigh-Bennett	Conservative	John Arthur Fyler	Conservative	Death
North Fermanagh	20 March 1903	Edward Archdale	Irish Unionist	Edward Mitchell	Russellite Unionist	Resignation
Rye	17 March 1903	Arthur Montagu Brookfield	Conservative	Charles Frederick Hutchinson	Liberal	Resignation
Woolwich	11 March 1903	Lord Charles Beresford	Conservative	Will Crooks	Labour Repr. Cmte.	Resignation
Galway Borough	9 March 1903	Arthur Lynch	Irish Parliamentary	Charles Ramsay Devlin	Irish Parliamentary	Disqualification on conviction for high treason
Dublin University	5 March 1903	W. E. H. Lecky	Liberal Unionist	James Campbell	Irish Unionist	Resignation
East Perthshire	26 February 1903	John Kinloch	Liberal	Thomas Buchanan	Liberal	Resignation
South Antrim	5 February 1903	William Ellison-Macartney	Irish Unionist	Charles Craig	Irish Unionist	Resignation
Liverpool West Derby	20 January 1903	Samuel Higginbottom	Conservative	William Rutherford	Conservative	Death
Newmarket	2 January 1903	Harry McCalmont	Conservative	Charles Day Rose	Liberal	Death
Orkney and Shetland	18–19 November 1902	Cathcart Wason	Liberal Unionist	Cathcart Wason	Independent Liberal	Resignation on leaving party
Liverpool East Toxteth	6 November 1902	Augustus Frederick Warr	Conservative	Austin Taylor	Conservative	Resignation
Cleveland	5 November 1902	Alfred Pease	Liberal	Herbert Samuel	Liberal	Resignation
Devonport	22 October 1902	E. J. C. Morton	Liberal	John Lockie	Conservative	Death
Sevenoaks	21 August 1902	Henry Forster	Conservative	Henry Forster	Conservative	Lord Commissioner of the Treasury
Belfast South	18 August 1902	William Johnston	Irish Unionist	Thomas Sloan	Ind. Unionist	Death
East Worcestershire	15 August 1902	Austen Chamberlain	Liberal Unionist	Austen Chamberlain	Liberal Unionist	Postmaster General
Tiverton	14 August 1902	William Walrond	Conservative	William Walrond	Conservative	Chancellor of the Duchy of Lancaster
Clitheroe	1 August 1902 (Note: A gain at an uncontested by-election.)	Ughtred Kay-Shuttleworth	Liberal	David Shackleton	Labour Repr. Cmte.	Elevation to the peerage
Leeds North	29 July 1902	William Jackson	Conservative	Rowland Barran	Liberal	Elevation to the peerage
Bury	10 May 1902	James Kenyon	Conservative	George Toulmin	Liberal	Resignation
Woolwich	25 April 1902	Edwin Hughes	Conservative	Lord Charles Beresford	Conservative	Resignation
West Donegal	25 April 1902	James Boyle	Irish Parliamentary	Hugh Law	Irish Parliamentary	Resignation
Wakefield	25 March 1902	William Wentworth-FitzWilliam	Conservative	Edward Brotherton	Conservative	Succession to peerage
South Monaghan	4 March 1902	James Daly	Irish Parliamentary	John McKean	Irish Parliamentary	Resignation
North Kilkenny	26 February 1902	Patrick McDermott	Irish Parliamentary	Joseph Devlin	Irish Parliamentary	Resignation
South Down	19 February 1902	Michael McCartan	Irish Parliamentary	Jeremiah McVeagh	Irish Parliamentary	Resignation
East Down	5 February 1902	James Alexander Rentoul	Irish Unionist	James Wood	Russellite Unionist	Assistant Judge, City of London Court
Sheffield Ecclesall	3 February 1902	Ellis Ashmead-Bartlett	Conservative	Samuel Roberts	Conservative	Death
Dewsbury	28 January 1902	Mark Oldroyd	Liberal	Walter Runciman	Liberal	Resignation
Hampstead	24 January 1902	Edward Brodie Hoare	Conservative	Thomas Milvain	Conservative	Resignation
Galway Borough	21 November 1901	Martin Morris	Irish Unionist	Arthur Lynch	Irish Parliamentary	Succession to peerage
North East Lanarkshire	26 September 1901	John Colville	Liberal	William Rattigan	Liberal Unionist	Death
Andover	26 August 1901	Bramston Beach	Conservative	Edmund Faber	Conservative	Death
Wokingham	12 July 1901	Oliver Young	Conservative	Ernest Gardner	Conservative	Resignation
Stratford-on-Avon	25 June 1901	Victor Milward	Conservative	Philip Foster	Conservative	Death
Saffron Walden	31 May 1901	Hon. Armine Wodehouse	Liberal	Jack Pease	Liberal	Death
Oswestry	24 May 1901	Stanley Leighton	Conservative	George Ormsby-Gore	Conservative	Death
Mid Cork	17 May 1901	Charles Tanner	Irish Parliamentary	D. D. Sheehan	Irish Parliamentary	Death
Monmouth	7 May 1901	Frederick Rutherfoord Harris	Conservative	Joseph Lawrence	Conservative	Unseated on petition
Maidstone	1 March 1901	John Barker	Liberal	Sir Francis Evans	Liberal	Void election
Stretford	26 February 1901	Sir John Maclure	Conservative	Charles Cripps	Conservative	Death
North Monaghan	21 December 1900	Daniel MacAleese	Irish Parliamentary	Edward Charles Thompson	Irish Parliamentary	Death
Blackpool	21 December 1900	Sir Matthew White Ridley	Conservative	Henry Worsley-Taylor	Conservative	Elevation to the peerage
West Derbyshire	11 December 1900	Victor Cavendish	Liberal Unionist	Victor Cavendish	Liberal Unionist	Treasurer of the Household
Woodbridge	10 December 1900	E. G. Pretyman	Conservative	E. G. Pretyman	Conservative	Civil Lord of the Admiralty
Wellington (Somerset)	10 December 1900	Alexander Acland-Hood	Conservative	Alexander Acland-Hood	Conservative	Vice-Chamberlain of the Household
Guildford	10 December 1900	St John Broderick	Conservative	St John Broderick	Conservative	Secretary of State for War
Preston	8 December 1900	Robert William Hanbury	Conservative	Robert William Hanbury	Conservative	President of the Board of Agriculture
Dover	8 December 1900	George Wyndham	Conservative	George Wyndham	Conservative	Chief Secretary for Ireland

== Sources ==
- List of MPs since 1660
- Craig, F. W. S. (ed.). Chronology of British Parliamentary By-elections 1833–1987.
- Craig, F. W. S. (ed.). British Parliamentary Election Statistics 1832–1987.
- Craig, F. W. S. (ed.). British Parliamentary Election Results 1885–1918.
- Walker, Brian M., ed. (1978). Parliamentary Election Results in Ireland, 1801–1922. Dublin: Royal Irish Academy. ISBN 0901714127.
