= Liverpool Kirkdale by-election =

Liverpool Kirkdale by-election may refer to:

- 1898 Liverpool Kirkdale by-election
- 1907 Liverpool Kirkdale by-election
- 1910 Liverpool Kirkdale by-election
- 1915 Liverpool Kirkdale by-election
