= Tom Abbott (socialist) =

British socialist activist

John Thomas Abbott (19 February 1872 – 22 September 1949) was a British socialist activist.

Abbott grew up in Blackburn and became a weaver at a young age. He joined the Independent Labour Party (ILP) in 1894, shortly after its formation, and agitated in opposition to the Second Boer War. As a result, he lost his job, and instead became a full-time organiser for the ILP, initially in Accrington, then in Whitehaven, and from 1918 in Manchester, covering the important Lancashire District of party.

At the 1931 general election, Abbott stood for the ILP in Stockport. Although this was a two-member seat, the official Labour Party candidate refused to run a joint campaign, and while Abbott ultimately took 15,591 votes, this left him in last place.

He supported the disaffiliation of the ILP from the Labour Party, but in 1934 he resigned from the ILP, protesting about the involvement of the Revolutionary Policy Committee, the predominance of middle-class members of the National Administrative Council, and moves to reduce the autonomy of branches from the centre. Several other members left the party in his wake, including Arthur Mostyn, a former councillor, and they linked up with former MP Elijah Sandham to form the Independent Socialist Party. Abbott was elected as its general secretary, but the party achieved little and was wound up shortly after his death in 1949.
