= Liverpool Kirkdale =

Parliamentary constituency in the United Kingdom, 1885–1983

- Former borough constituency for the House of Commons
- Liverpool Kirkdale in Lancashire, showing boundaries used from 1974-1983

1885–1983
- Seats: one
- Replaced by: Liverpool Walton, Liverpool Broadgreen and Liverpool Riverside

Liverpool Kirkdale was a constituency represented in the House of Commons of the Parliament of the United Kingdom covering Kirkdale, Liverpool. It elected one Member of Parliament (MP) by the first past the post system of election.

== Boundaries ==
1885–1918: The parish of Kirkdale, and part of the parish of Everton.

1918–1950: The County Borough of Liverpool wards of Kirkdale and St Domingo.

1950–1955: The County Borough of Liverpool wards of Anfield, Breckfield, and Kirkdale.

1955–1974: The County Borough of Liverpool wards of Anfield, Breckfield, Melrose, Tuebrook, and Westminster.

1974–1983: The County Borough of Liverpool wards of Anfield, Breckfield, Melrose, St Domingo, Tuebrook, and Westminster.

== Members of Parliament ==
Election	Member	Party
1885	Sir George Baden-Powell	Conservative
1898 by-election	David MacIver	Conservative
1907 by-election	Charles McArthur	Liberal Unionist
1910 by-election	Gerald Kyffin-Taylor	Conservative
1915 by-election	De Fonblanque Pennefather (Note: Adopted the name John in 1923 and created a baronet in 1924.)	Conservative
1929	Elijah Sandham	Labour
1931	Sir Robert Rankin	Conservative
1945	William Keenan	Labour
1955	Norman Pannell	Conservative
1964	James Dunn	Labour
1981	James Dunn	SDP
1983	constituency abolished	

== Election results 1885–1918 ==
=== Elections in the 1880s ===
General election 1885: Liverpool Kirkdale
Party	Candidate	Votes	%	±%
Conservative	George Baden-Powell	3,391	55.2	
Lib-Lab	James Samuelson	1,981	32.3	
Irish Nationalist	John Redmond	765	12.5	
Majority		1,410	22.9	
Turnout		6,317	73.5	
Registered electors		8,346		
Conservative win (new seat)				

General election 1886: Liverpool Kirkdale
Party	Candidate	Votes	%	±%
Conservative	George Baden-Powell	3,084	58.7	+3.5
Liberal	Ralph Neville	2,172	41.3	+9.0
Majority		912	17.4	−5.5
Turnout		5,256	63.0	−10.5
Registered electors		8,346		
Conservative hold		Swing	-2.7	

=== Elections in the 1890s ===
General election 1892: Liverpool Kirkdale
Party	Candidate	Votes	%	±%
Conservative	George Baden-Powell	3,750	57.5	−1.2
Lib-Lab	T. R. Threlfall	2,773	42.5	+1.2
Majority		977	15.0	−2.4
Turnout		6,523	68.2	+5.2
Registered electors		9,567		
Conservative hold		Swing	-1.2	

Baden-Powell

General election 1895: Liverpool Kirkdale
Party	Candidate	Votes	%	±%
Conservative	George Baden-Powell	3,818	60.7	+3.2
Liberal	Benjamin Sands Johnson	2,468	39.3	−3.2
Majority		1,350	21.4	+6.4
Turnout		6,286	65.3	−2.9
Registered electors		9,631		
Conservative hold		Swing	+3.2	

Baden-Powell's death caused a by-election.

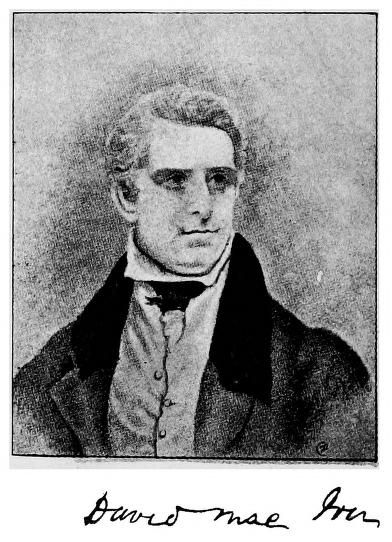
MacIver

1898 Liverpool Kirkdale by-election
Party	Candidate	Votes	%	±%
Conservative	David MacIver	Unopposed		
Conservative hold				

=== Elections in the 1900s ===
Cherry

General election 1900: Liverpool Kirkdale
Party	Candidate	Votes	%	±%
Conservative	David MacIver	4,333	71.4	+10.7
Liberal	Richard Cherry	1,738	28.6	−10.7
Majority		2,595	42.8	+21.4
Turnout		6,071	56.8	−8.5
Registered electors		10,695		
Conservative hold		Swing	+10.7	

General election 1906: Liverpool Kirkdale
Party	Candidate	Votes	%	±%
Conservative	David MacIver	3,749	54.3	−17.1
Labour Repr. Cmte.	James Conley	3,157	45.7	New
Majority		592	8.6	−34.2
Turnout		6,284	65.2	+8.4
Registered electors		10,596		
Conservative hold		Swing	N/A	

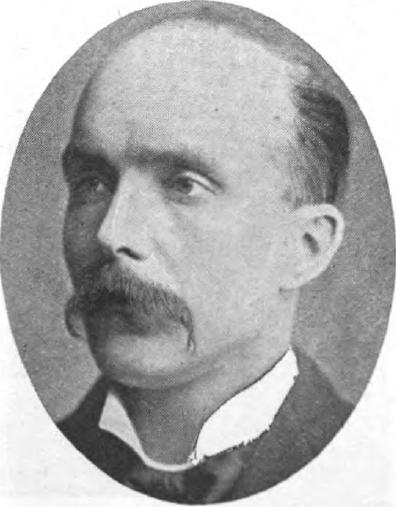
Hill

1907 Liverpool Kirkdale by-election
Party	Candidate	Votes	%	±%
Conservative	Charles MacArthur	4,000	54.6	+0.3
Labour	John Hill	3,330	45.4	−0.3
Majority		670	9.2	+0.6
Turnout		7,330	69.6	+4.4
Registered electors		10,529		
Conservative hold		Swing	+0.3	

=== Elections in the 1910s ===
General election January 1910: Liverpool Kirkdale
Party	Candidate	Votes	%	±%
Conservative	Charles MacArthur	4,144	51.4	−3.2
Labour	Alexander Gordon Cameron	3,921	48.6	+3.2
Majority		223	2.8	−6.4
Turnout		6,065	77.8	+8.2
Conservative hold		Swing	-3.2	

1910 Liverpool Kirkdale by-election
Party	Candidate	Votes	%	±%
Conservative	Gerald Kyffin-Taylor	4,268	55.5	+4.1
Labour	Alexander Gordon Cameron	3,427	44.5	―4.1
Majority		841	11.0	+8.2
Turnout		7,695	74.3	―3.5
Conservative hold		Swing	+4.1	

General election December 1910: Liverpool Kirkdale
Party	Candidate	Votes	%	±%
Conservative	Gerald Kyffin-Taylor	4,205	58.4	+2.9
Labour	Thomas McKerrell	2,992	41.6	―2.9
Majority		1,213	16.8	+5.8
Turnout		7,197	69.5	―4.8
Conservative hold		Swing	+2.9	

1915 Liverpool Kirkdale by-election
Party	Candidate	Votes	%	±%
Unionist	De Fonblanque Pennefather	Unopposed		
Unionist hold				

== Elections 1918–1945 ==
=== Elections in the 1910s ===
General election 1918: Liverpool Kirkdale
Party	Candidate	Votes	%	±%
Unionist	De Fonblanque Pennefather	10,380	67.4	N/A
Labour	Samuel Mason	5,012	32.0	New
Majority		5,368	34.4	N/A
Turnout		15,392	50.0	N/A
Unionist hold		Swing	N/A	
C indicates candidate endorsed by the coalition government.

=== Elections in the 1920s ===
General election 1922: Liverpool Kirkdale
Party	Candidate	Votes	%	±%
Unionist	De Fonblanque Pennefather	Unopposed	N/A	N/A
Unionist hold				

General election 1923: Liverpool Kirkdale
Party	Candidate	Votes	%	±%
Unionist	De Fonblanque Pennefather	Unopposed	N/A	N/A
Unionist hold				

General election 1924: Liverpool Kirkdale
Party	Candidate	Votes	%	±%
Unionist	John Pennefather	14,392	60.6	N/A
Labour	Elijah Sandham	9,369	39.4	New
Majority		5,023	21.2	N/A
Turnout		23,761	73.7	N/A
Unionist hold		Swing	N/A	

General election 1929: Liverpool Kirkdale
Party	Candidate	Votes	%	±%
Labour	Elijah Sandham	15,222	51.3	+11.9
Unionist	Robert Rankin	14,429	48.7	―11.9
Majority		793	2.6	N/A
Turnout		29,651	72.9	―3.8
Labour gain from Unionist		Swing	+11.9	

=== Elections in the 1930s ===
General election 1931: Liverpool Kirkdale
Party	Candidate	Votes	%	±%
Conservative	Robert Rankin	14,303	45.2	―3.5
Ind. Labour Party	Elijah Sandham	9,531	30.1	―21.2
Protestant	Henry Dixon Longbottom	7,834	24.7	New
Majority		4,772	15.1	N/A
Turnout		31,668	77.5	+4.6
Conservative gain from Labour		Swing	+8.8	

General election 1935: Liverpool Kirkdale
Party	Candidate	Votes	%	±%
Conservative	Robert Rankin	10,540	38.8	―6.4
Labour	John Hamilton	9,984	36.7	+6.6
Protestant	Henry Dixon Longbottom	6,677	24.6	―0.1
Majority		556	2.1	―13.0
Turnout		27,201	69.5	―8.0
Conservative hold		Swing	―6.5	

General Election 1939–40

Another General Election was required to take place before the end of 1940. The political parties had been making preparations for an election to take place and by the Autumn of 1939, the following candidates had been selected;

- Conservative: Robert Rankin
- Labour: John Hamilton
- Liverpool Protestant Party: Henry Dixon Longbottom

=== Elections in the 1940s ===
General election 1945: Liverpool Kirkdale
Party	Candidate	Votes	%	±%
Labour	William Keenan	10,640	54.1	+17.4
Conservative	Aled Roberts	6,414	32.6	―6.2
Protestant	Henry Dixon Longbottom	2,601	13.2	―11.4
Majority		4,226	21.5	N/A
Turnout		19,655	64.3	―5.2
Labour gain from Conservative		Swing	+11.8	

== Elections 1950–1979 ==
=== Elections in the 1950s ===
General election 1950: Liverpool Kirkdale
Party	Candidate	Votes	%	±%
Labour	William Keenan	19,219	48.7	―5.4
Conservative	David J. Lewis	18,591	47.1	+14.5
Liberal	June Stananought Pritchard	1,648	4.2	New
Majority		628	1.6	―19.9
Turnout		39,458	79.7	+15.4
Labour hold		Swing	―10.0	

General election 1951: Liverpool Kirkdale
Party	Candidate	Votes	%	±%
Labour	William Keenan	19,637	51.0	+2.3
Conservative	David J. Lewis	18,879	49.0	+1.9
Majority		758	2.0	+0.4
Turnout		38,516	77.9	―1.8
Labour hold		Swing	+0.2	

General election 1955: Liverpool Kirkdale
Party	Candidate	Votes	%	±%
Conservative	Norman Pannell	22,356	52.1	+3.1
Labour	William Keenan	20,542	47.9	―3.1
Majority		1,814	4.2	N/A
Turnout		42,898	70.6	−7.3
Conservative gain from Labour		Swing	+3.1	

General election 1959: Liverpool Kirkdale
Party	Candidate	Votes	%	±%
Conservative	Norman Pannell	22,416	53.3	+1.2
Labour Co-op	Thomas H. Hockton	19,669	46.7	―1.2
Majority		2,747	6.6	+2.4
Turnout		42,085	73.7	+3.1
Conservative hold		Swing	+1.2	

=== Elections in the 1960s ===
General election 1964: Liverpool Kirkdale
Party	Candidate	Votes	%	±%
Labour	James Dunn	20,128	55.5	+8.8
Conservative	Norman Pannell	16,120	44.5	―8.8
Majority		4,008	11.0	+4.4
Turnout		36,248	69.1	―4.6
Labour gain from Conservative		Swing	+8.8	

General election 1966: Liverpool Kirkdale
Party	Candidate	Votes	%	±%
Labour	James Dunn	19,233	59.3	+3.8
Conservative	Norman Pannell	13,219	40.7	―3.8
Majority		6,014	18.6	+7.6
Turnout		32,452	65.7	―3.4
Labour hold		Swing	+3.8	

=== Elections in the 1970s ===
General election 1970: Liverpool Kirkdale
Party	Candidate	Votes	%	±%
Labour	James Dunn	17,678	56.5	―2.8
Conservative	Michael P. Tinne	13,615	43.5	+2.8
Majority		4,063	13.0	―5.6
Turnout		31,293	63.7	―2.0
Labour hold		Swing	―2.8	

General election February 1974: Liverpool Kirkdale
Party	Candidate	Votes	%	±%
Labour	James Dunn	16,443	52.7	―4.9
Conservative	James Gillin	9,918	31.8	―10.6
Liberal	Paul Desmond Mahon	4,866	15.6	New
Majority		6,525	20.9	+7.9
Turnout		31,227	69.5	+5.8
Labour hold		Swing	+7.8	

General election October 1974: Liverpool Kirkdale
Party	Candidate	Votes	%	±%
Labour	James Dunn	17,686	61.4	+8.7
Conservative	Maurice Edward Jones	8,205	28.5	―3.3
Liberal	Michael Storey	2,908	10.1	―5.5
Majority		9,481	32.9	+12.0
Turnout		28,799	63.5	―6.0
Labour hold		Swing	+6.0	

General election 1979: Liverpool Kirkdale
Party	Candidate	Votes	%	±%
Labour	James Dunn	17,043	56.1	―5.3
Conservative	Myra Fitzsimmons	9,334	30.7	+2.2
Liberal	Paul Desmond Mahon	3,819	12.6	+2.5
National Front	Warner Reginald Williams	198	0.7	New
Majority		7,709	25.4	―7.5
Turnout		30,394	70.2	+6.7
Labour hold		Swing	―3.8	
