= William Keenan =

William Keenan OBE (1889 – 15 December 1955) was a British trade unionist and politician.

Born in Bootle, Keenan became an official of the Transport and General Workers' Union in 1923. He also joined the Labour Party, and was elected to Bootle Town Council in 1925, serving until 1945, including a term as Mayor of Bootle in 1944. He was Labour Member of Parliament (MP) for Liverpool Kirkdale from 1945 to 1955.

Parliament of the United Kingdom
Preceded by Robert Rankin	Member of Parliament for Liverpool Kirkdale; 1945 – 1955	Succeeded by Norman Pannell
