= Elijah Sandham =

English politician

Member of Parliament for Liverpool Kirkdale
- In office 30 May 1929 – 27 October 1931

Personal details
- Born: 1875
- Died: 7 May 1944 (aged 68)
- Party: Labour

Elijah Sandham (1875 – 7 May 1944) was an English Independent Labour Party (ILP) politician from Lancashire. He sat in the House of Commons from 1929 to 1931 as the Member of Parliament (MP) for Kirkdale division of Liverpool, and in 1934 he led the breakaway Independent Socialist Party.

== Career ==
Sandham was elected in 1906 to Chorley Town Council, and remained active in the ILP, which at the time was affiliated to the Labour Party.

At the 1918 general election he unsuccessfully contested the Chorley division of Lancashire, and in 1924 he stood in Liverpool Kirkdale, where he lost by a wide margin to the sitting Conservative Party MP Sir John Pennefather, Bt. However, Pennefather retired from the Commons at the 1929 general election, when Sandham defeated the Conservative candidate Robert Rankin with a slim majority of 793 votes (2.6% of the total).

=== In Parliament ===
In Parliament, he took a radical socialist viewpoint. In April 1930, the Commons debated on the Unemployment Insurance Bill, in which the Minister of Labour Margaret Bondfield proposed to raise the borrowing limit of the Insurance Fund to cope with high unemployment. The Liberal MP Milner Gray had suggested that a permanent solution to the funding problem lay in tackling the unequal share of wealth going to the rentier class. Sandham replied that his only interest in the rentier class was to abolish them.

However, it was a contribution outside Parliament which brought Sandham to wider attention. On 28 July 1930, the Manchester Guardian newspaper reported a speech by in Manchester by Sandham in which he denounced Labour MPs. The report was read to the Commons on 28 July 1930 by the Conservative MP Earl Winterton, who asserted that these assertions amounted to a "gross libel upon honourable Members of this House and is a grave breach of its Privileges. Sandham was not present, so debate was adjourned until the following day, when he explained that the speech had been made in response to the suspension of the Labour MP John Beckett. Sandham read to the House a longer extract from the speech, including the portion to which Winterton had objected:

When John Beckett touched the sacred symbol the other day, faces went white with horror. When J. H. Thomas took the initiative some time ago in handing over to the bankers the sacred reality of Parliamentary power, not a thrill of apprehension of regret stirred the conscience of these same custodians of democratic law and tradition. The sheer, stupid, tradition of this ghost-house has got most of the Members in its deadly grip. Labour Members can receive bribes to help pass doubtful Bills in the interests of private individuals. Labour Members can get stupidly drunk in this place. But none of these things are against the sacred traditions of the House. In fact, they are in keeping with them. It is known that Labour Members accepted money from moneylenders and other interests, and it is known that Labour Members of Parliament get drunk in the House. Our leaders see nothing wrong in that, or at any rate, such conduct is not bad enough to create a demand for their expulsion

The matter was referred to the Committee of Privileges, whose report was issued on 30 July. The Committee found that "in making such allegations to a public meeting instead of from his place in the House of Commons the honourable member was guilty of a gross breach of privilege" and that "in stating that acceptance of bribes was in keeping with the traditions of this House he was guilty of a gross libel upon the House as a whole". On 31 July the Commons debated the report, and voted by 304 to 13 that Sandham should be admonished by the Speaker.

=== After Parliament ===
At the next general election, in 1931, he lost his seat to Rankin, and did not stand for Parliament again.

Sandham had been chairman of the Lancashire division of the ILP, but after the ILP disaffiliated from the Labour Party in 1932 he became critical of the power which the Revolutionary Policy Committee held within the ILP. In 1934 he led the breakaway Independent Socialist Party (ISP). The ISP's support was concentrated in North-West England, although it had a small pocket of support in East Anglia, but it never gained a significant following and was wound up in the 1950s.

He died aged 68 on 7 May 1944, at Horncliffe, Blackpool.

Parliament of the United Kingdom
Preceded by Sir John Pennefather, Bt	Member of Parliament for Liverpool Kirkdale; 1929–1931	Succeeded by Gerald Kyffin-Taylor
Party political offices
Preceded by James Hindle Hudson	Lancashire Division representative on the Independent Labour Party National Administrative Council; 1925–1934	Succeeded by Bob Edwards
