= Frank Wolstencroft =

British trade union leader (1882–1952)

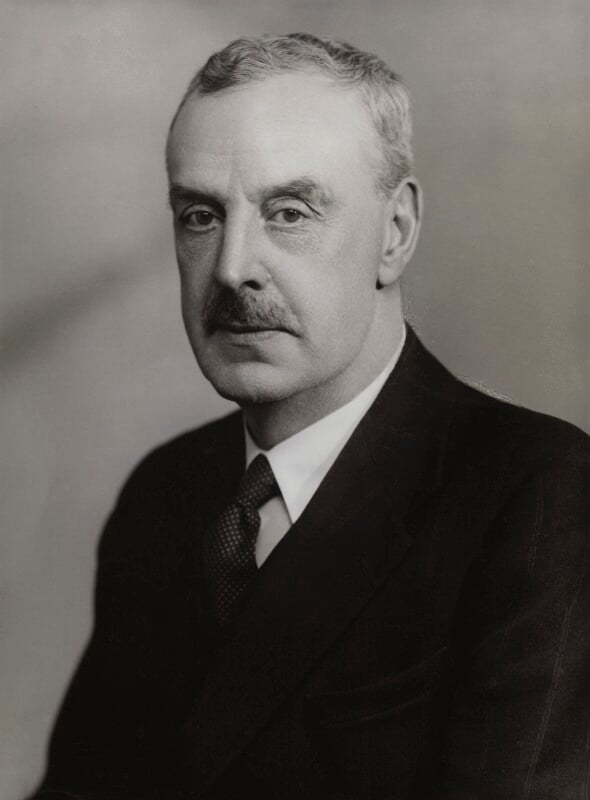
Wolstencroft in 1941

Frank Wolstencroft CBE (23 December 1882 – 30 June 1952) was a British trade union leader.

Born in Royton in Lancashire, Wolstencroft entered work at an early age, then at the age of sixteen was apprenticed as a joiner. He joined the Amalgamated Society of Carpenters and Joiners (ASC&J) in 1906 and was elected as its Royton branch secretary the following year. Soon, he was also serving as secretary of its Oldham district, and in 1914 he was elected to its national Executive Council.

Wolstencroft was elected as Assistant General Secretary of the ASC&J in 1920, and then in 1926 he became General Secretary of its successor, the Amalgamated Society of Woodworkers (ASW), elected by a huge majority. This was a period of rapid growth for the union, and Wolstencroft also worked to build international links; during World War II, he was a key founder of the Anglo-Soviet Trade Union Committee.

In 1928, he was elected to the General Council of the Trades Union Congress (TUC), serving until 1949, and in 1942, he was President of the TUC. He also served on executive of the International Union of Woodworkers and its successors, the National Insurance Advisory Committee, and the board of the Disabled Persons Employment Corporation. In 1947, he received the CBE. He retired from the general secretaryship in 1948, becoming President of the Co-operative Press.

In his spare time, Wolstencroft enjoyed a variety of sports.

Trade union offices
| Preceded by Alexander Gordon Cameron | Assistant General Secretary of the Amalgamated Society of Carpenters and Joiners; 1920 | Succeeded by Position abolished |
| Preceded by New position | Assistant General Secretary of the Amalgamated Society of Woodworkers; 1921–1925 | Succeeded by Thomas O. Williams |
| Preceded by Alexander Gordon Cameron | General Secretary of the Amalgamated Society of Woodworkers; 1925–1948 | Succeeded by Jack McDermott |
| Preceded by Allan Findlay and Arthur Shaw | Trades Union Congress representative to the American Federation of Labour; 1931; With: John Beard | Succeeded by Charles Dukes and Bill Holmes |
| Preceded by George Gibson | President of the Trades Union Congress; 1942 | Succeeded by Anne Loughlin |
