= Norman Pannell =

British and Nigerian politician (1901–76)

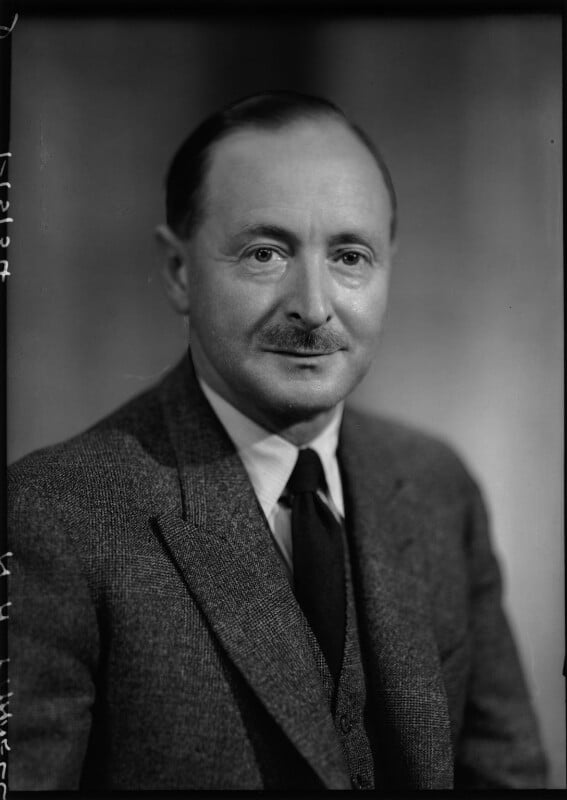
- Pannell in 1950

Member of Parliament for Liverpool Kirkdale
- In office 26 May 1955 – 25 September 1964
- Preceded by: William Keenan
- Succeeded by: James Dunn

Personal details
- Born: Norman Alfred Pannell; 17 April 1901
- Died: 8 March 1976 (aged 74)
- Party: Conservative

Norman Alfred Pannell, FCIS (17 April 1901 – 8 March 1976) was a British finance manager and politician who became a Liverpool Conservative Party Member of Parliament. He was known as one of the strongest supporters of restrictions on immigration, but his campaign ended when he lost his seat in 1964.

== Commercial life ==
Pannell attended Sir George Monoux Grammar School in Walthamstow, but left at the age of 16 to go into business. He worked for various companies in London and Paris, before joining John Holt & Co (Liverpool) Ltd in 1930 as a district agent in Nigeria. He married Isabel Morris in 1932. In 1937 he was made a Fellow of the Chartered Institute of Secretaries, and the next year accepted a promotion to coast inspector. Pannell served on the Nigerian Legislative Council from 1944.

== Liverpool ==
In 1945, he resigned from the Nigerian Legislative Council and moved to Liverpool where he was a finance manager for a firm of West African merchants and shipowners for five years. Pannell became involved with the Conservative Party in the city; at the 1951 general election he was Conservative candidate in Liverpool Scotland, and in 1952 was elected to Liverpool City Council. He was a governor of Liverpool Blue Coat School from 1953.

== Election to Parliament ==
Pannell was selected as Conservative candidate for the constituency of Liverpool Kirkdale at the 1955 general election, a marginal seat which was held by Labour. With the help of favourable boundary changes he won by 1,814 votes. As a backbench MP, Pannell specialised in Commonwealth issues; in May 1956 he initiated an adjournment debate in which he called attention to the effect on the British economy if newly independent colonies spent their sterling balances outside the sterling area. He welcomed political development in colonies such as Gold Coast, but called for constitutional safeguards to protect the economy and make it safe for investment.

== Immigration issue ==
Over the Suez Crisis, Pannell supported the government and later opposed the policy of withdrawal from the canal zone; he was one of 14 (eight of whom had resigned the Conservative whip) to abstain on a vote endorsing the Government's policy in May 1957. Later that year he began a campaign to change the terms on which Commonwealth citizens were allowed to enter the United Kingdom, arguing that seventy per cent of those convicted of living off immoral earnings in London were citizens of other Commonwealth countries or the Republic of Ireland. He came back to this issue after race riots in Nottingham in August 1958, calling also for general immigration control. However, he failed to persuade the Government and in April 1959, his amendment to the Street Offences Bill to allow deportation was rejected by 8 votes to 22 in Standing Committee. He successfully moved a motion at the 1958 Conservative Party conference to bring in immigration controls.

Pannell was on the board of the Ashanti Goldfields Corporation from December 1958. In April 1959 he initiated a debate on the status of smaller territories within the Commonwealth, calling for them not to be forced to adopt Parliamentary democracy because it allowed politicians "to play on the emotions of an immature electorate". He also pressed for the flying of the St George's flag from government buildings on St George's Day.

== Further campaigning ==
After re-election with an increased majority at the 1959 general election, Pannell became more involved on the issue of restricting immigration. In July 1960 he led a delegation to see Home Secretary R.A. Butler, calling for all immigrants to produce a certificate of good health and an assurance that they had a job to go to. In April 1961 he was a key mover in an amendment which unsuccessfully urged the reintroduction of corporal punishment for young offenders. His concern about the Commonwealth led him to oppose British entry to the Common Market when it was proposed in 1962.

Pannell introduced a Private Member's Bill in 1962 to end the right of Irish citizens to vote in United Kingdom elections, although it did not make progress. He did not back the Macmillan government over the Profumo affair. He remained very active in calling for immigration restrictions, often linking the issue to unemployment and the crime rate. In April 1964 he called for the use of high pressure fire hoses to stop hooligans.

== Defeat ==
At the 1964 general election, Pannell lost his seat to Labour. He was keen to stand again to try to regain his position, and was mentioned as a possible Conservative candidate in the Birmingham Hall Green by-election in 1965, although this came to nothing. He was a joint author with Lord Brockway of "Immigration – What is the Answer?" in 1965, putting forward the case for restrictions while Brockway advocated allowing continued immigration.

== Local politics ==
In the event Pannell did not fight the 1966 general election, although he was re-elected to Liverpool City Council in 1967 and became Chairman of the Education Committee. He served three years; as he was living at Heswall on the Wirral Peninsula, he was elected to Cheshire County Council in 1970. When the Wirral became part of Merseyside, Pannell was elected to the Metropolitan County Council in 1973, and remained a member until his death three years later. He also has a school in Netherley Liverpool named in his honour.

Parliament of the United Kingdom
Preceded by William Keenan	Member of Parliament for Liverpool Kirkdale; 1955–1964	Succeeded by James Dunn
