= 1874 Birkenhead by-election =

UK Parliamentary by-election

← 1874 (GE)	24 November 1874	1880 →

Constituency of Birkenhead
- Registered: 7,458
- Turnout: 79.0% (▼8.3%)
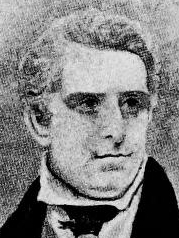
	First party	Second party
		Lib
Candidate	David MacIver	Samuel Stitt
Party	Conservative	Liberal
Popular vote	3,421	2,474
Percentage	58.0%	42.0%
Swing	▼12.0%	▲12.0%
MP before election
John Laird
Conservative
Elected MP
David MacIver
Conservative

The 1874 Birkenhead by-election was fought on 24 November 1874. The by-election was fought due to the death of the incumbent Conservative MP, John Laird. It was won by the Conservative candidate David MacIver.

== Result ==
By-election, 26 Nov 1884: Birkenhead
Party	Candidate	Votes	%	±%
Conservative	David MacIver	3,421	58.0	−12.0
Liberal	Samuel Stitt	2,474	42.0	+12.0
Majority		947	16.0	−24.0
Turnout		5,895	79.0	+8.3
Registered electors		7,458		
Conservative hold		Swing	−12.0	
