= 1918 Newcastle-upon-Tyne by-election =

UK parliamentary by-election

The 1918 Newcastle-upon-Tyne by-election was a parliamentary by-election held on 13 May 1918 for the House of Commons constituency of Newcastle-upon-Tyne in the historic county of Northumberland.

== Vacancy ==
The by-election was caused by the appointment of the sitting Liberal MP Edward Shortt, as Chief Secretary for Ireland. He succeeded Henry Duke who resigned the post in response to the announcement by Prime Minister David Lloyd George on 9 April of Irish conscription. Shortt had come to Lloyd George's attention when he made a success of chairing a select committee set up to review the difficult subject of the general administration of the Military Service Acts. Under the Parliamentary rules of the day applicable to the appointment of ministers, Shortt had to resign and fight a by-election.

== Candidates ==
As the sitting member, Shortt was selected to fight the by-election for the Liberals. As participants in the wartime coalition the Conservatives agreed not to contest the by-election, although they did so deploring the fact that Shortt had recently voted not to apply the Military Service Acts to Ireland.

== The result ==
No other candidate came forward to contest the election and Shortt was returned unopposed.

== The votes ==
Newcastle-upon-Tyne by-election, 1918
| Party | Candidate | Votes | % | ±% |
|---|---|---|---|---|
| Liberal | Edward Shortt | Unopposed | N/A | N/A |
| Liberal hold | | | | |

== See also ==
- List of United Kingdom by-elections (1900–1918)
