= Alexander Gordon Cameron =

British trade unionist and politician (1876-1944)

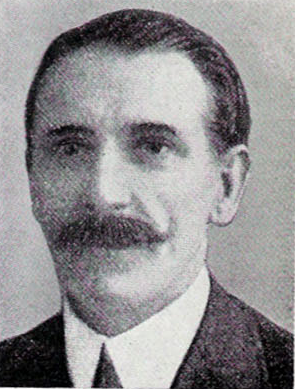
Cameron, while secretary of the ASC&J

Alexander Gordon Cameron (15 June 1876 – 30 May 1944) was a British trade unionist and Labour Party politician.

== Biography ==
Cameron was born in 1876 in Oban, Argyll, and served his apprenticeship as a joiner in Glasgow. On becoming a journeyman he moved to London, where he became an active member of the Amalgamated Society of Carpenters and Joiners (ASC&J), becoming the union's shipping delegate in 1912, and assistant general secretary in 1915, and general secretary in 1919. When the ASC&J became part of the Amalgamated Society of Woodworkers in 1921, Cameron was its first general secretary.

He was nominated by his union as a parliamentary candidate for the Independent Labour Party. After failing to become the prospective candidate for Glasgow Camlachie in 1908, and the ASC&J declined an invitation to sponsor him as candidate for Coventry in the following year. He stood unsuccessfully at Liverpool Kirkdale at the January 1910 general election and again at a by-election later in the year. In the December 1910 general election he was defeated at Jarrow, where Labour lost to the Liberals.

In 1914 Cameron was elected to the executive of the Labour Party, a position he was to retain for many years. In 1917 he was appointed by the Coalition Government to be one of the Scottish members of the Commission on Industrial Unrest. In 1918 he again failed to be elected to parliament, this time at Woolwich West.

In 1920 Cameron was part of the Labour Party delegation to the Second International in Geneva. He was elected chairman of the Labour Party for 1920/21. In 1925 ill health led to his resigning from his posts as representative to the Socialist International and general secretary of the woodworkers' union.

At the 1929 general election Cameron finally succeeded in being elected, becoming MP for Widnes. He was however defeated at the next election in 1931 when there was a large swing against Labour.

Cameron retired from politics, and at the time of his death in a London hospital in 1944, was described as a building contractor.

Parliament of the United Kingdom
Preceded by Christopher Clayton	Member of Parliament for Widnes; 1929–1931	Succeeded by Roland Robinson
Party political offices
Preceded by William Harold Hutchinson	Chairman of the Labour Party; 1920–1921	Succeeded by Fred Jowett
Trade union offices
Preceded by New position	Assistant General Secretary of the Amalgamated Society of Carpenters and Joiners; 1915–1919	Succeeded by Frank Wolstencroft
Preceded by Francis Chandler	General Secretary of the Amalgamated Society of Carpenters and Joiners; 1919–1921	Succeeded by Post abolished
Preceded by New post	General Secretary of the Amalgamated Society of Woodworkers; 1921–1925	Succeeded by Frank Wolstencroft
