= Sir Robert Rankin, 1st Baronet =

British politician (1877–1960)

Sir Robert Rankin, 1st Baronet (18 October 1877 – 11 October 1960) was a Liverpool shipbuilder, and British Conservative politician, who was elected a Member of Parliament for Liverpool Kirkdale in 1931 until 1945.

== Career ==
Rankin worked for Pollok, Gilmour and Company, before it was subsequently renamed, and he became director and chairman of shipbuilders Rankin, Gilmour and Company, Liverpool. He was president of the Lonsdale Unionist Division (1937–1947), a vice-president of the Royal Commonwealth Society, and a vice-president of the Air League of the British Empire.

He was selected High Sheriff of Lancashire for 1948.

== Personal ==
Born in Liverpool in 1877, Robert Rankin was the elder son of John Rankin (b. 14 Feb 1845 Greenbank, New Brunswick, nephew of Robert Rankin) and his wife Helen Margaret (daughter of James Jack, married John 1 September 1875, died 1937). He attended Sedbergh School and Clare College, Cambridge, and in 1914, joined the 18th Royal Fusiliers (Public School Brigade), and later became a captain in the Royal Army Service Corps.

He had two daughters by his first wife, Helen Mary (daughter of James Edmund Baker of Tehran, Iran), who died in 1932. In 1940 he married Rachel Dufrin (daughter of Charles Dufrin Drayson of Melton Court).

=== Fortune ===
His first wife's step-father, John Joseph Fahie, left him a fortune in 1934. In 1937, the Rankin Baronetcy was created, becoming the 1st Baronet of Broughton Towers at Broughton-in-Furness. In 1946, Rankin gifted the mansion and 1205 acres, to Lancashire.

=== Death and funeral ===
Those attending his funeral at Golders Green Crematorium on Friday 14 October 1960 included Lady Rankin, Air Vice-Marshal and Mrs John Grandy (son-in-law and daughter), Mrs C.H.M. Shaw (daughter), Mr James Rankin (brother), Lieutenant R. Rankin and Mr John Cherry (grandsons), Mr and the Hon. Mrs George Drayson and Mrs K. Bull (brothers-in-law and sisters-in-law), Mrs Jefferson Hogg (sister-in-law), Mr and Mrs William Rathbone (nephew and niece), Mr and Mrs W. Rathbone, (great-nephew and great-niece.

After his death, he paid £506,159 gross death duty, and bequeathed £250 each to the Liverpool School of Tropical Medicine, the Royal Commonwealth Society, the Liverpool Conservative Association, and the Rankin Boys Club. His brother, James Stuart Rankin (1880–1960), Conservative MP for East Toxteth, 1916–1924, died nine days later on 20 October 1960.

=== Children ===
By his first wife Renée Helen Lilian Mary Baker (1884 in Teheran, Persia – 13 March 1932), the daughter of James Edmund Baker (the nephew of Thomas Oxley) and his wife Florence Sarah Hanson McKenzie, he had two daughters:

- Corise Helen Margaret Rankin (1911–1967), amateur aviator, married firstly solicitor and later Wing Commander John Cherry (b. 16 July 1905), the son of Sir Benjamin Lennard Cherry, and secondly Richard George Shaw. Children of first marriage:
  - Robert Benjamin Rankin (15 November 1934 – 2006)
  - John Loraine Cherry (13 July 1939 – 28 December 2022)
- Cécile Elizabeth Florence Rankin (1914–1993), Lady Grandy

== Arms ==
Coat of arms of Sir Robert Rankin, 1st Baronet

Crest
In front of a cubit arm in armour holding in the hand a battle axe Proper three roses Gules barbed and seeded also Proper.
Escutcheon
Per fess Or and Azure in chief a battle axe erect between two boars' heads couped Sable armed Argent and in base on waves of the sea in front of a sun rising a ship in full sail Proper.
Motto
Prudentia Et Virtute

== Bibliography ==
- John Rankin, A history of our firm: being some account of the firm of Pollok, Gilmour and Co. and its offshoots and connections, 1804–1920, publ. 1921, page 325

Parliament of the United Kingdom
Preceded by Elijah Sandham	Member of Parliament for Liverpool Kirkdale; 1931–1945	Succeeded by William Keenan
Baronetage of the United Kingdom
New creation	Baronet (of Broughton Tower, Lancashire); 1937–1960	Extinct
