= James Dunn (British politician) =

British politician

Member of Parliament for Liverpool Kirkdale
- In office 15 October 1964 – 13 May 1983
- Preceded by: Norman Pannell
- Succeeded by: Constituency abolished

Personal details
- Born: James Anthony Dunn; 30 January 1926
- Died: 27 April 1985 (aged 59)
- Party: SDP (from 1981)
- Other political affiliations: Labour (until 1981)
- Children: 4

James Anthony Dunn KSG (30 January 1926 – 27 April 1985) was a Labour Party politician in the United Kingdom.

Dunn was educated at St. Theresa's School, Liverpool and the London School of Economics and became an engineer. He was a councillor on Liverpool City Council from 1958 until 1965 and served as secretary of Liverpool Co-operative Party. He was a councillor for the ward of Kirkdale, a very working-class area that was moving from voting Conservative to voting for the Labour Party.

Dunn was elected Labour Member of Parliament (MP) for Liverpool Kirkdale in 1964. He was a government whip from 1974 to 1976, and junior Northern Ireland minister from 1976 to 1979. From 1964 to 1970 he was a member of the Commons Estimates Committee and a member of the Commons Procedures Committee from 1964 until 1967.

In 1980, Dunn was convicted of shoplifting a sweatshirt, two ties and two armbands vauled at £15.13 from the Army & Navy Stores in Victoria and a map valued at 60p from a stationers' shop in Artillery Row on 27 July 1979. At the time he had been taking anti-depressant drugs. He had been followed out of the Army & Navy Stores by two store detectives who then saw him stealing the map. When they caught him he requested a quiet chat, but was turned over to the police. His trial took place on 12 May 1980, and Dunn pleaded not guilty. Although he admitted taking the goods he used as his defence his state of mind at the time of the incident. Dunn claimed that he had panicked when he saw the store detectives as he thought they were people he had dealt with in Northern Ireland. He was in poor health at the time, having had a heart attack in 1978, and had found his time as a minister, which involved regular trips to and from Northern Ireland, had left him exhausted. Additionally the evening before the offense he had attended a late-night debate in Parliament and consumed five half-pints of beer in the House of Commons bar. After this he had taken a sleeping tablet, but had only had "a fitful night's sleep". He said he was unable to remember exactly his actions the following day. Although he was found guilty, the judge accepted that his "appalling state of health" had caused him to act out of character and gave him a conditional discharge though he had to pay £100 costs.

In 1981, Dunn was among the Labour MPs who defected to the new Social Democratic Party. In 1983, he left the House of Commons when his seat was abolished by boundary changes. He died at the age of 59 in 1985.

Dunn had four children.

Parliament of the United Kingdom
| Preceded by Norman Pannell | Member of Parliament for Liverpool Kirkdale; 1964–1983 | Constituency abolished |
