= Independent Socialist Party (UK) =

- Chairman: Elijah Sandham, E. Stevenson
- General Secretary: Tom Abbott
- Founded: 1934
- Dissolved: 1950s
- Preceded by: Revolutionary Policy Committee
- Newspaper: Labour's Northern Voice
- Ideology: Socialism, Democratic socialism, Marxism, Social democracy
- Political position: Left-wing

The Independent Socialist Party (ISP) was a political party in the UK. It was formed in 1934 as a breakaway from the Independent Labour Party (ILP) in protest at the increasing power of the Revolutionary Policy Committee within the ILP.

The ISP was led by Elijah Sandham, a former ILP MP who had been Chairman of the Lancashire Division of the ILP, and Tom Abbott, former Lancashire organiser for the party. The Lancashire ILP newspaper Labour's Northern Voice also supported the ISP. Outside Lancashire, the ISP was supported by the literary critic John Middleton Murry and his Adelphi magazine – and a small ISP based community was founded around his East Anglian home to show socialism as a living entity.

The ISP was socialist and resolutely anti-war, but was firmly anti-communist.

It failed to gain substantial support after its formation. Several branches rejoined the ILP during World War II, and, following the deaths of its founders (in 1944 and 1949) the party wound itself up in the early 1950s.
