= 1898 Liverpool Kirkdale by-election =

English parliamentary by-election

The 1898 Liverpool Kirkdale by-election was a parliamentary by-election held in England on 9 December 1898 for the British House of Commons constituency of Liverpool Kirkdale.

== Vacancy ==
The seat had become vacant when the sitting Conservative Member of Parliament (MP), Sir George Baden-Powell had died on 20 November 1898, aged 50. He had held the seat since its creation for the 1885 general election, and had been re-elected with comfortable majorities at each of the three subsequent general elections.

== Candidates ==
Several names were floated as possible Conservative candidates for the seat. On 26 November, The Times newspaper reported that those being considered included:

- David MacIver, the chair of the Liverpool Conservatives who had been the MP for nearby Birkenhead from 1874 until he stood down at the 1885 general election, owing to business commitments
- Alderman John Houlding, a former Lord Mayor of Liverpool
- Joseph Hoult, a local ship-owner
- Sir Edward P. Bates, the son of former Plymouth MP Sir Edward Bates, 1st Baronet

The Liberal Party had already adopted as their candidate for the next election William Nelson, a ship-owner and Liverpool City Councillor.

By the time Kirkdale Conservative Association met on 29 November, the local executive committee had already sent a telegram to 40-year-old Austin Taylor, inviting to be their candidate. Taylor, who was president of the Laymen's League and son of the Archdeacon of Liverpool, had deferred his answer until the day of the meeting. At the meeting, the divisional council refused to be bound by the decision of their executive, and the names of David MacIver and John Houlding were also formally proposed.

After a discussion described by The Times as "long and animated", a substantial majority voted to select MacIver, a ship-owner whose father Charles had been manager of the Cunard Line from 1865 to 1897.

The Liberals met on 1 December, and lamented their lack of preparedness. Local ship-owner Sir Christopher Furness had been invited to stand, but declined. Another ship-owner, H. Bell, had also turned down a request, and the meeting rejected a proposal to adopt Thomas Snape, the former MP for Heywood. The meeting decided to ask the Liberal whips in Westminster to suggest potential candidates, as a result of which an approach was made to Sir Spencer Walpole, who rejected the invitation. The Times reported that several other unsuccessful approaches had been made. Kirkdale had a large Irish Nationalist population, so any candidate needed the support of both Liberals and Nationalists, but local councillor Thomas J. Flynn also refused to accept nomination despite an offer to meet all his election expenses.

== Result ==
By the time nominations closed on 9 December, the Liberals had still not chosen a candidate. MacIver was the only candidate nominated, so the poll had been scheduled for 15 December, but never took place. MacIver was returned unopposed.

== Aftermath ==
MacIver was re-elected at the general elections in 1900 and 1906, and held the seat until his death in September 1907 caused another by-election.

== See also ==
- Liverpool Kirkdale constituency
- Kirkdale, Merseyside
- 1907 Liverpool Kirkdale by-election
- 1910 Liverpool Kirkdale by-election
- 1915 Liverpool Kirkdale by-election
- List of United Kingdom by-elections (1885–1900)
