= 1910 Liverpool Kirkdale by-election =

English parliamentary election

The 1910 Liverpool Kirkdale by-election was a parliamentary by-election held in England on 20 July 1910 for the British House of Commons constituency of Liverpool Kirkdale.

== Vacancy ==
The by-election was caused by the death on 3 July 1910 of Charles McArthur, Kirkdale's Conservative Member of Parliament (MP). He had held the seat since a by-election in 1907, having previously been MP for Liverpool Exchange from 1897 to 1906.

The writ for the by-election was moved in the Commons on 12 July by Sir Alexander Acland-Hood, the MP for Wellington.

== Candidates ==
By 5 July, rumours were circulating in Liverpool that the Conservative candidate would be Alderman Barran, but The Times newspaper reported that these were unfounded. The paper also reported that it was unlikely that a Liberal candidate would be nominated, making the election a two-contest between Labour and the Conservatives, as had been the case in the general elections of 1906 and January 1910. However, the paper noted that Liberal votes would likely be cast almost entirely for the Labour candidate, while Labour were confident that their likely candidate Alexander Gordon Cameron would attract the Protestant votes which were so significant in that area.

On 9 July the Conservatives adopted Colonel Gerald Kyffin-Taylor as their candidate. He announced that his priority at the election would be defence of the British Empire, and he also committed himself to tariff reform, while opposing to Irish Home Rule and reform of the House of Lords.

== Campaign ==
Kikdale was known in Liverpool as the "bedroom of the docks"; an area housing dock labourers and the poorest of the poor, as well as the skilled tradesmen who worked in the constituency's docks and shipyards. There was nothing resembling an upper class in Kirkdale, where skilled artisans and shopkeepers sat at the top of the social scale. The Times reported that while both groups deplored the passionate religious sectarianism which was rife in the poorer areas of the constituency, Kyffin-Taylor had made a strident Protestantism a main plank of his campaign.

Cameron denounced the sectarianism, and The Times reported that despite the furious speeches on religious matters, the election was likely to be decided by whether voters preferred Kyffin-Taylor's tariff reform to Cameron's socialism, although Cameron made little use of the term.

The Liberals' role in the campaign was subdued, with support for the Labour candidate expressed in terms of patronage and apology. Despite Cameron's support for Home Rule, and the large number of Irish people in the constituency, there was no Irish nationalist campaign in his support, whereas many Irish Unionists addressed public meetings. The Labour campaign also lacked high-profile speakers. Ramsay MacDonald made one speech before leaving again, whereas the Conservatives had a succession of good local speakers, including all their local MPs.

== Election ==
Polling took place on 20 July, and the count took place that evening. The result was a victory for Kyffin-Taylor, who held the seat for the Conservatives with a majority of 841 votes, or 11% of the total. This was a slight increase on McArthur's 2.8% majority in January.

After the declaration, Kyffin-Taylor went to the Liverpool Conservative Club, where he described his win as a victory for Constitutionalism against Socialism, as a declaration that a Protestant country should have a Protestant king. He said that voters were tired of a government which would not look after the defences of the Empire and tired of seeing men unemployed when tariff reform could restore jobs.

His speech was followed by an address from Alderman Salvidge, who denounced The Times special correspondent for preferring to have a socialist sitting in the Commons, and complained that other leading Conservative journalists had also tried to discredit Kyffin-Taylor's campaign.

== Aftermath ==
Kyffin-Taylor was re-elected at the general election in December 1910, with an increased majority. During the First World War, he was appointed to command the Artillery of the West Lancashire Division in January 1915 as a temporary colonel, and he resigned from the Commons in February 1915 due to his military commitments. In 1917 he was promoted to the rank of Brigadier General.

== Results ==
Election	Political result	Candidate	Party	Votes	%	±%
General election, January 1910; Electorate: 10,361; Turnout: 6,065 (77.8%) +8.2	Conservative hold Majority: 223 (2.8%) −6.4; Swing: 3.2% from Con to Lab	Charles MacArthur	Conservative	4,144	51.4	−3.2
General election, January 1910; Electorate: 10,361; Turnout: 6,065 (77.8%) +8.2	Conservative hold Majority: 223 (2.8%) −6.4; Swing: 3.2% from Con to Lab	Alexander Gordon Cameron	Labour	3,921	48.6	+3.2
By-election, July 1910 death of MacArthur; Electorate: 10,361; Turnout: 74.3% (−3.5)	Conservative hold Majority: 841 (11.0%) +8.2; Swing: 4.1% from Lab to Con	Gerald Kyffin-Taylor	Conservative	4,268	55.5	+4.1
By-election, July 1910 death of MacArthur; Electorate: 10,361; Turnout: 74.3% (−3.5)	Conservative hold Majority: 841 (11.0%) +8.2; Swing: 4.1% from Lab to Con	Alexander Gordon Cameron	Labour	3,427	44.5	−4.1

== See also ==
- Liverpool Kirkdale constituency
- Kirkdale, Merseyside
- 1898 Liverpool Kirkdale by-election
- 1907 Liverpool Kirkdale by-election
- 1915 Liverpool Kirkdale by-election
- List of United Kingdom by-elections (1900–1918)
