= Charles McArthur =

British politician

Charles McArthur (May 1844 – 3 July 1910) was a British average adjuster from Liverpool. He became a Liberal Unionist politician who sat in the House of Commons in two periods between 1897 and 1910.

== Life ==
McArthur was born near Bristol in Kingsdown, the son of Charles McArthur from Port Glasgow in Scotland. He was educated at Bristol Grammar School, and moved to Liverpool in 1860 (aged 16) to work for North, Ewing & Co. However that business was unsuccessful, and in 1874 McArthur established his own average adjuster's business, Cort & McArthur. This business prospered, and McArthur became one of the best-known average adjusters in England. He served as chairman of the Association of Average Adjusters in the United Kingdom, as well as President of Liverpool Chamber of Commerce from 1892 to 1896, and as a Justice of the Peace in Liverpool. He served on several committees relating to marine insurance, including the Comité Maritime International, and wrote several books on marine insurance. He also wrote on religious topics.

In 1897 he was chosen as the Liberal Unionist candidate for the by-election in the Liverpool Exchange seat. He was elected with a majority of only 54 votes (1% of the total) over his Liberal Party opponent Russell Rea, and at the 1900 general election he was returned with an increased majority of 1,297 (30% of the votes) over the Liberal Frederick William Verney.

However, at the next election, in 1906, McArthur was defeated by the Liberal Richard Cherry, who had recently been appointed as Attorney General for Ireland. Apart from the nationwide swing to the Liberals, who gained 216 seats in that election, McArthur's defeat involved several local factors. As a free trader, he lost the support of the many local unionists who favoured the system of protectionism known at the time as tariff reform; while his staunch opposition to Irish Home Rule galvanised the large Irish Nationalist population to support Cherry.

However, McArthur returned to Parliament the following year, when he was elected at a by-election in September 1907 as the MP for Liverpool Kirkdale. He told constituents that his election was a defeat of the Labour Party candidate John Hill was a great victory for "the Protestants of Kirkdale" over socialists and Irish nationalists. He was re-elected in January 1910, and held the seat until his death.

McArthur died aged 66 on 3 July 1910 at his home in London, from a gastric illness. His body was taken by train to Liverpool, and his funeral was held at Wallasey Cemetery in Liscard, Cheshire.

Parliament of the United Kingdom
Preceded by John Bigham	Member of Parliament for Liverpool Exchange; 1897–1906	Succeeded by Richard Cherry
Preceded by David MacIver	Member of Parliament for Liverpool Kirkdale; 1907–1910	Succeeded by Gerald Kyffin-Taylor
