= 1907 Liverpool Kirkdale by-election =

English parliamentary by-election

The 1907 Liverpool Kirkdale by-election was a by-election held in England on 27 September 1907 for the British House of Commons constituency of Liverpool Kirkdale, a division of the city of Liverpool.

== Vacancy ==
The seat had become vacant when the sitting Conservative Member of Parliament (MP), David MacIver had died on 1 September 1907, aged 67. He had held the seat since being elected unopposed at a by-election in 1898, having previously been MP for Birkenhead from 1874 to 1885.

Election	Political result	Candidate	Party	Votes	%	±%
General election, January 1906; Electorate: 10,596; Turnout: 6,284 (65.2%) +8.4	Conservative hold Majority: 592 (8.6%) −34.2	David MacIver	Conservative	3,749	54.3	−17.1
General election, January 1906; Electorate: 10,596; Turnout: 6,284 (65.2%) +8.4	Conservative hold Majority: 592 (8.6%) −34.2	James Conley	Labour Repr. Cmte.	3,157	45.7	New

== Candidates ==
The Liberal Unionist candidate was 63-year-old Charles McArthur, who had been the MP for Liverpool Exchange from 1897 until his defeat at the 1906 general election.

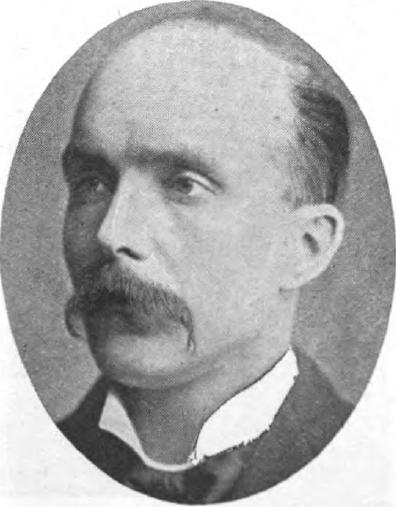
John Hill

The Labour Party candidate was 42-year-old John Hill, a Scottish trade unionist who unsuccessfully contested Glasgow Govan at the 1906 general election.

== Result ==
On a slightly increased turnout, the result was a victory for McArthur, who slightly increased his majority of that won by McIver in 1906.

Election	Political result	Candidate	Party	Votes	%	±%
By-election, September 1907 death of MacIver; Electorate: 10,529; Turnout: 7,330 (69.6%) +4.4	Conservative hold Majority: 670 (9.2%) +0.6; Swing: 0.3% from Lab to Con	Charles MacArthur	Conservative	4,000	54.6	+0.3
By-election, September 1907 death of MacIver; Electorate: 10,529; Turnout: 7,330 (69.6%) +4.4	Conservative hold Majority: 670 (9.2%) +0.6; Swing: 0.3% from Lab to Con	John Hill	Labour	3,330	45.4	−0.3

== Aftermath ==
McArthur held the seat at the January 1910 general election, but died in office later that year, triggering another by-election.

Hill did not stand for Parliament again, but became general secretary of the United Society of Boilermakers and Iron and Steel Shipbuilders in 1909, and served as President of the Trades Union Congress in 1917.

== See also ==
- Liverpool Kirkdale constituency
- Kirkdale, Merseyside
- 1898 Liverpool Kirkdale by-election
- 1910 Liverpool Kirkdale by-election
- 1915 Liverpool Kirkdale by-election
- List of United Kingdom by-elections (1900–1918)
