= 1903 North Leitrim by-election =

UK parliamentary by-election

The 1903 North Leitrim by-election was a by-election held for the British House of Commons constituency of North Leitrim. The sitting MP, P. A. McHugh was unseated after being declared bankrupt, but he won the seat again unopposed.

The by-election caused some controversy as there was doubt as to whether McHugh would be allowed to stand due to being bankrupt. This meant that his supporters first nominated Peter McHugh, the MP's father so that there would be a Home Rule supporter able to be voted in as MP if there was a Unionist supporter, the worry being that a Unionist candidate could be elected by default if PA McHughes' candidacy was disallowed. As there was no unionist candidate the nomination was withdrawn in the final hour allowed which meant that the by-election was unopposed.

There was still considerable doubt after the by-election as to whether the successful candidate could take his seat or vote in the House of Commons due to his undischarged bankruptcy.

By-election, 1903: North Leitrim
Party	Candidate	Votes	%	±%
Irish Parliamentary	P. A. McHugh	Unopposed		
Registered electors		6,629		
Irish Parliamentary hold				
