= 1913 Shrewsbury by-election =

English parliament by-election

The 1913 Shrewsbury by-election was a Parliamentary by-election held on 22 April 1913. The constituency returned one Member of Parliament (MP) to the House of Commons of the United Kingdom, elected by the first past the post voting system.

== Vacancy ==
The seat had become vacant when Shrewsbury's Conservative MP Sir Clement Hill died aged 67 on 9 April 1913, after a bout of influenza led to pneumonia and pleurisy. A diplomat for 40 years before entering politics, he had held the seat since the 1906 general election. Shrewsbury had elected only Conservative Party MPs to the House of Commons since 1885.

== Candidates ==
The Unionist candidate was 59-year old George Butler Lloyd, a Marlborough and Cambridge-educated banker whose home was at Shelton Hall, near Shrewsbury. Butler Lloyd was an alderman of Shrewsbury Corporation and had been Mayor of Shrewsbury for 1886-87 and 1888-89.

The local Liberal Party were keen to field as candidate Thomas Pace, a local builder, who had contested the seat in December 1910 as a Liberal-Labour candidate. Pace was a strong suffragist in support of votes for women, unlike the Unionist Butler Lloyd, who opposed extending the franchise. However, the National Union of Women's Suffrage Societies (NUWSS) had recently adopted a new policy of not supporting Liberal party candidates, even those Liberal candidates who were strong suffragists like Pace. Liberal Party headquarters regarded a contest as inexpedient. Thus Pace withdrew from the contest. When nominations closed on 19 April, Butler Lloyd faced only one opponent, the independent candidate J. Robert Morris.

== Campaign ==
=== Votes for Women ===
The NUWSS, whose policy had contributed to the withdrawal of the Liberal candidate who supported them, chose not to support either the Unionist or the Independent. Without a candidate to support, the NUWSS were reduced to just carrying out propaganda work during the by-election.

In the course of the contest Butler Lloyd had the assistance of his brother, Ernest Thomas Lloyd, Resident Magistrate in Ireland, formerly stationed in counties Kerry, Meath, and Londonderry, who spoke strongly during the election against proposed Irish Home Rule.

On 21 April, the eve of poll, the former MP Horatio Bottomley spoke on behalf of Morris at a meeting of thousands of people in the town, where the principal speakers for Butler Lloyd were Henry Page Croft MP and William Bridgeman MP.

== Result ==
Polling took place on 22 April, and Butler Lloyd held the seat with a slightly increased majority of 685 votes (16.6% of the total).

Shrewsbury by-election, 1913
Party	Candidate	Votes	%	±%
Unionist	George Butler Lloyd	2,412	58.3	+1.7
Independent	James Robert Morris	1,727	41.7	New
Majority		685	16.6	+3.4
Turnout		4,139	81.0	−6.6
Unionist hold		Swing		

== Aftermath ==
Butler Lloyd held the seat for nine years. The parliamentary borough of Shrewsbury was abolished at the 1918 general election, but was replaced by a larger county division of the same name, where Butler Lloyd was re-elected. He retired from the House of Commons at the 1922 general election.
