= 1915 Liverpool Kirkdale by-election =

English parliamentary by-election

The 1915 Liverpool Kirkdale by-election was a parliamentary by-election held in England on 15 February 1915 for the British House of Commons constituency of Liverpool Kirkdale.

== Vacancy ==
The by-election was caused by the resignation of the sitting Conservative Member of Parliament (MP), Colonel Gerald Kyffin-Taylor due to his military commitments.

The writ for the by-election was moved in the Commons on 10 February by Lord Edmund Talbot, the MP for Chichester.

== Candidates ==
During World War I, the major political parties had agreed not to contest by-elections when seats held by their respective parties fell vacant. The Conservative candidate De Fonblanque Pennefather was therefore returned unopposed, without any need for a vote. He took his seat in the Commons on 17 February.

== See also ==
- Liverpool Kirkdale constituency
- Kirkdale, Merseyside
- 1898 Liverpool Kirkdale by-election
- 1907 Liverpool Kirkdale by-election
- 1910 Liverpool Kirkdale by-election
- List of United Kingdom by-elections (1900–1918)
