= Revolutionary Policy Committee =

Fraction of the Independent Labour Party

The Revolutionary Policy Committee (RPC) was a faction within the former British political party, the Independent Labour Party (ILP). The RPC was formed in 1931 by members of the ILP who were especially unhappy with the gradualist policies of the Second Labour Government (1929-1931). The RPC was founded by Jack Gaster, a lawyer and son of Moses Gaster, the Sephardic Chief Rabbi of England, and Dr C.K. Cullen, a medical inspector from Poplar.

The RPC was particularly active in London and its initial focus was on advocating the disaffiliation of the ILP from the Labour Party. After it achieved this aim, in 1932, the RPC sought to bring about closer cooperation between the ILP and the Communist Party of Great Britain, and advocated affiliation to the Comintern. In 1933 the RPC successfully persuaded the ILP to adopt the policy of merging with the Communist Party, although this was never followed through. Within the ILP the RPC increasingly came to be seen as a vehicle for Communist entryists and aroused strong feelings of hostility.

In 1934 there was a split in the ILP as some opponents of the RPC, led by John Middleton Murry and Elijah Sandham, left to form the Independent Socialist Party. By 1935 the RPC's influence was waning and, following internal divisions about the appropriate response to the Abyssinian Crisis in 1935, the leading members of the RPC decided to wind it up, leave the ILP and join the Communist Party.
