= 1917 Dundee by-election =

UK parliamentary by-election

- 30 July 1917

Constituency of Dundee
- Registered: 21,953
- Turnout: 42.5% (▼41.6%)
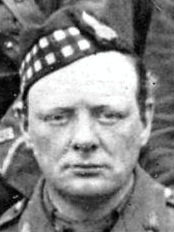

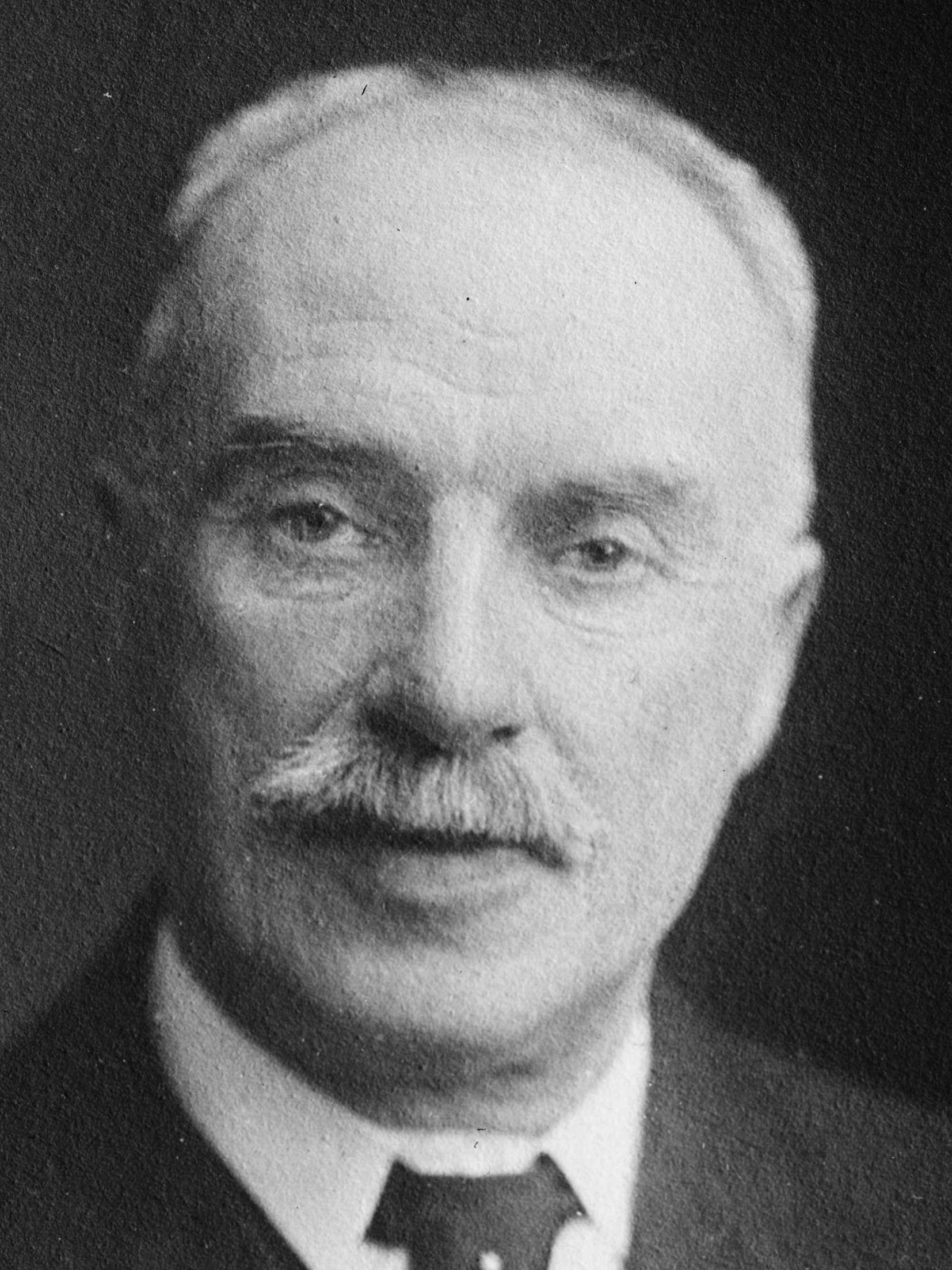
	First party	Second party
Candidate	Winston Churchill	Edwin Scrymgeour
Party	Liberal	Scottish Prohibition
Popular vote	7,302	2,036
Percentage	78.2%	21.8%
MP before election
Winston Churchill
Liberal
Elected MP
Winston Churchill
Liberal

The 1917 Dundee by-election was a parliamentary by-election for the British House of Commons constituency of Dundee in the county of Angus held on 30 July 1917.

== Vacancy ==
The by-election was caused by the appointment of one of the two sitting MPs for the constituency, Winston Churchill, as minister of munitions. Under the Parliamentary rules applying at the time, members appointed to ministerial posts had to resign their seats and fight a by-election. At that time Dundee was represented by Churchill as a Liberal, with Alexander Wilkie holding the other seat for Labour.

== Churchill's return to government ==
Churchill's appointment to the government represented a political comeback, one of many in his career. Closely associated with the military fiasco of the Gallipoli landings on the Dardanelles and the dreadful loss of life of Allied personnel, Churchill had been replaced as First Lord of the Admiralty and given a lesser appointment as Chancellor of the Duchy of Lancaster. This was apparently one of the Conservative demands for joining the first Coalition government of the First World War under Prime Minister H H Asquith and may have had as much to do with settling old scores against their former rising star as their reservations about Churchill's skills as a military strategist. In November 1915 Churchill resigned from the government and went to the Western Front on active service as a battalion commander. In December 1916 David Lloyd George, Churchill's former close colleague in Asquith's radical reforming administration between 1908 and 1914, became prime minister. By July 1917, now secure in his position vis-a-vis his Conservative coalition partners, Lloyd George was ready to recall Churchill to the Cabinet, perhaps to strengthen its Liberal composition even further. A report into the Dardanelles disaster published in March 1917 had concluded that Churchill was neither solely nor principally responsible, and Churchill was beginning to re-establish himself as an effective Westminster performer. One source even suggests that Lloyd George feared Churchill could emerge as a new leader of the opposition if the war continued to go badly. But Lloyd George clearly wanted his talented old ally as a support in difficult times and, despite widespread criticism of Churchill's recall, Lloyd George announced Churchill's appointment as minister of munitions on 18 July.

== Electoral truce ==
During the First World War, there was an electoral truce between the main political parties by which it was agreed that all by-election vacancies would be filled unopposed by the party holding the seat. The Unionists were reported to be closely observing the party truce, and the Labour Party in Dundee also passed a resolution against the adoption of a Labour candidate. However, Churchill was not to face an uncontested election.

== Candidates opposing Churchill ==
On 24 July 1917, The Times reported that the Hon. Stuart Erskine, one of the sons of the 5th Baron Erskine had been planning a candidacy against Churchill but had decided to withdraw, although it is not clear upon what platform Erskine was proposing to contest the election. More importantly as it transpired, it was also reported that Churchill would face opposition from Edwin Scrymgeour as an advocate of alcohol prohibition and as representative of organised labour. Scrymgeour represented a serious challenge. He was a well-known local man from a prominent Dundee family and in total contrast to Churchill stood for fundamentalist religious views, extreme temperance and left-wing socialism. He was an elected member of the Burgh Council, having first been elected to the parish council, the body in charge of Dundee's poorhouses and poor relief as a representative of the Independent Labour Party as long before as 1895. He also had Parliamentary election experience having stood against Churchill on three previous occasions.

Scrymgeour's candidature was not however endorsed by the Labour Party, as noted above, with Alexander Wilkie formally announcing there should be no contest and defending Churchill from Scrymgeour's criticisms.

== The campaign ==
At an early stage Churchill set out his stall as the government candidate who was putting aside party political argument at a time of national emergency. At a meeting in Lochee on 27 July, Churchill said the sole issue the electors had to consider was "....the prosecution of a righteous war to an unmistakable victory". Despite saying that he refused to be drawn into any kind of electioneering or bickering, he straightway attacked Scrymgeour, who had been formally nominated as the candidate of the Scottish Prohibition Party, for seeking peace with Germany in order to suppress the Scottish liquor trade. Later in the campaign Churchill appealed to the voters not to defeat him as the government candidate as this would in effect send a message to Britain's enemies that the country was weakening in its desire to win the war. Scrymgeour was indeed opposed to the war and said so openly, in the same way that he had also spoken out against the Boer War and he also stood up for the rights of conscientious objectors.

Despite Churchill's patriotic stance and appeals for an absence of party politicking, and no doubt because of the local status and strong opinions of Scrymgeour, the election has been characterised as a stormy campaign. As a minister Churchill was often detained in London on government business, whereas Scrymgeour was able to be a full-time candidate and it often fell to Churchill's wife, Clementine to address meetings which could be rowdy. In contrast, however, The Times reported that polling day itself was quiet, with no vehicles for the conveyance of voters to the polls and very little election literature.

== Result ==
The result was a hold for the government party, with Churchill taking nearly 80% of the poll and a majority 5,266 votes. Despite this apparently overwhelming endorsement, however, one historian has warned against seeing the Dundee result as the clear-cut vindication of government policy it seemed. Churchill won because he got support from all the parties supporting the government, Liberal, Conservative and Labour and he received a personal vote from the Irish/Catholic population.

Scrymgeour went on to fight Churchill at Dundee twice more, eventually beating him in 1922. He remains the only person ever to be elected to the House of Commons on a prohibitionist ticket.

Dundee by-election, 1917
Party	Candidate	Votes	%	±%
Liberal	Winston Churchill	7,302	78.2	+58.1
Scottish Prohibition	Edwin Scrymgeour	2,036	21.8	+15.8
Majority		5,266	56.4	+44.9
Turnout		9,338	42.5	−41.6
Registered electors		21,953		
Liberal hold		Swing	+21.2	

== See also ==
- Lists of United Kingdom by-elections
- United Kingdom by-election records
- 1908 Dundee by-election
- 1924 Dundee by-election
