= David MacIver =

British politician

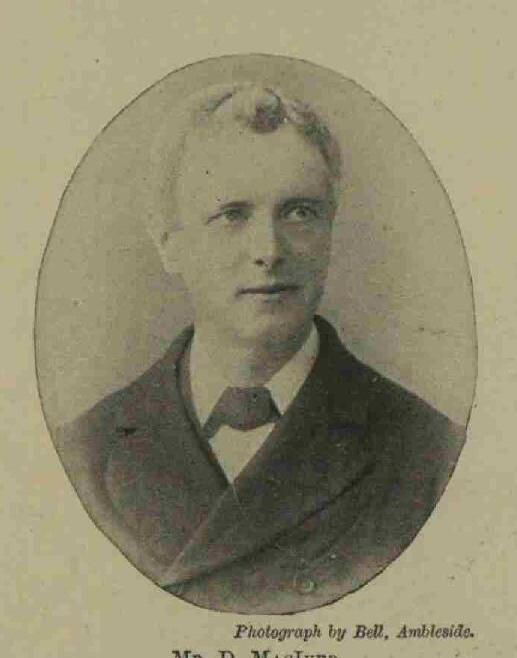

Member of the British Parliament for Birkenhead
- In office 1874–1885

Member of the British Parliament for Liverpool Kirkdale
- In office 1898–1907

Personal details
- Born: 24 August 1840 Liverpool, England
- Died: 1 September 1907 (aged 67)
- Party: Conservative
- Spouses: Anne Rankin; Edith Eleanor Squarey
- Children: 13, including Charles MacIver

David MacIver (24 August 1840 – 1 September 1907) was an English steam ship owner and a Conservative politician who sat in the House of Commons in two periods between 1874 and 1907.

== Early life ==
MacIver was born 24 August 1840 in Liverpool, the eldest son of Charles MacIver of Calderstone, and his wife Mary Ann Morrison, daughter of D. Morrison of Glasgow. He was educated at the Royal Institution School, Liverpool.

== Career ==
From 1863 he was a partner in the firm of D. and C. MacIver, who were managing owners of the Cunard Steamship Company. He was chairman of the Liverpool Steamship Owners Association and president of the American Chamber of Commerce. He was also a director of the Great Western Railway. He was a major in the 11th Lancashire Artillery Volunteers, an alderman and a J.P. for Liverpool. He was also commodore of the Royal Mersey Yacht Club.

In 1874, MacIver was elected Member of Parliament for Birkenhead. He held the seat until 1885. In 1898 he was elected MP for Liverpool Kirkdale and held the seat until his death aged 67 in 1907.

== Personal life ==
MacIver was twice married. His first marriage was to Anne Rankin, a daughter of Robert Rankin of Bromborough. Before her death in 1869, they were the parents of:

- Sir Charles MacIver (1866–1935), an Olympian who married Charlotte Eleanor Forwood in 1889
- Robert Rankin MacIver (b. c. 1869)

After her death in 1869, he married Edith Eleanor Squarey, a daughter of Eleanor Catharine Fulton and Andrew Tucker Squarey of Bebington. From 1875 to 1902 he and his family lived at Calderstones House in Liverpool. They were the parents of:

- David MacIver (b. 1875)
- Annie MacIver (b. 1876)
- Andrew Tucker Squarey MacIver (b. c. 1878)
- Margaret MacIver (b. c. 1880)
- Edith Eleanor MacIver (b. 1882)
- Edward Squarey MacIver (b. 1884)
- Dorothy MacIver (1888–1924), who married George Harold Jäger, son of George Jäger and Georgiana Morris, in 1908
- Ruth MacIver (b. 1889)
- Lois Margaret MacIver (b. 1890)
- Reginald Squarey MacIver (b. 1892)
- Alan Squarey MacIver (b. 1894), who married Lois K. Scott-Moncrieff in 1922

Three of MacIver's sons died in World War I. A fourth, Alan Squarey McIver, was awarded the Military Cross and was the Secretary of the ICAEW from 1950 to 1962.

=== Descendants ===
Through his eldest son Sir Charles, he was a grandfather of Olympian Charles R. MacIver.

Parliament of the United Kingdom
Preceded by John Laird	Member of Parliament for Birkenhead; 1874 – 1885	Succeeded by Sir Edward Hamley
Preceded by George Baden-Powell	Member of Parliament for Liverpool Kirkdale; 1898 – 1907	Succeeded by Charles McArthur
