= George Butler Lloyd =

British banker and politician

George Butler Lloyd (8 January 1854 – 28 March 1930) was a British banker and Conservative Party politician.

He was the eldest son of William Butler Lloyd (1825-1874), a banker, of Monkmoor Hall, Shrewsbury, and Preston Montford, Shropshire, and his wife Jane Amelia, who was fifth daughter of the Reverend George Hunt of Wadenhoe, Northamptonshire, and sister of George Ward Hunt, who became a cabinet minister under Benjamin Disraeli. He was born at Monkmoor Hall in 1854, and was educated at Marlborough College and St John's College, Cambridge.

He entered his family's banking firm of Burton, Lloyd and Company which in 1886 became absorbed by another Shrewsbury bank, Rocke, Eyton and Company to form Eyton, Burton, Lloyd and Company, also known as the Salop Old Bank, of which Lloyd became Senior Partner. In 1907, it was bought by the Capital and Counties Bank, which made him a director. In turn this was taken over in 1918 by Lloyds Bank Limited, which also made him director.

He was also director of the Birmingham branch of the Northern Assurance Company Ltd and deputy chairman of the Sentinel Waggon Works Ltd of Shrewsbury.

Butler Lloyd was a magistrate for the county of Shropshire and Borough of Shrewsbury and held posts in a number of other bodies including: Chairman of Shrewsbury Borough Education Committee in 1907, governor of Shrewsbury School, Deputy Treasurer of the Royal Salop Infirmary, Treasurer of the Atcham Poor Law Union, Shropshire and West Midlands Agricultural Society and Secretary of the South Shropshire Hunt.

Butler Lloyd served as Mayor of Shrewsbury in 1886-87 and 1888–89 and was an Alderman of Shrewsbury Borough Council from 1909 to 1920. He was also a member of Shropshire County Council, on which he represented Shrewsbury Welsh Ward from 1912 to 1925.

He was elected as Member of Parliament for Shrewsbury, then a borough constituency in a by-election in 1913, following the death of the previous incumbent, Sir Clement Lloyd Hill.

He had intended to only stay until the next general election, due no later than the end of 1915, and in February 1914 the parliamentary candidacy of his party had been accepted by (unrelated) George Ambrose Lloyd, at the time Member of Parliament for West Staffordshire. However both the election and the latter's candidature were forestalled by the outbreak of the First World War in August 1914. When the first postwar general election of December 1918 was held, George Ambrose Lloyd had been appointed Governor of Bengal while Butler Lloyd stood for election for the new county constituency the Shrewsbury seat had become, as Coalition Coupon candidate. He stood down at the 1922 general election.

He married in 1880 Constance Mary, daughter of Colonel Richard Jenkins, late 1st Bengal Cavalry, and had two sons and two daughters who survived him.

His home for most of his life was at Shelton Hall, near Shrewsbury. Butler Lloyd died at Shelton Hall on 28 March 1930 aged 76 and was buried on 31 March at Shrewsbury General Cemetery in Longden Road.

== Sources ==
- www.britishnewspaperarchive.co.uk/viewer/bl/0001480/19130426/108/0007
