= Gerald Kyffin-Taylor =

British politician

Brigadier-General Gerald Kyffin-Taylor CBE VD MP (9 March 1863 – 11 December 1949) was a British soldier and politician.

Kyffin-Taylor was educated at Liverpool College. His brothers included William Kyffin-Taylor, 1st Baron Maenan, and Austin Taylor MP.

In 1884 he qualified as a solicitor and went into partnership with John Lamb, and later in the firm of Snowball, Kyffin-Taylor and Pruddah. In 1886, he joined the volunteer force (later Territorial Army, specifically the 5th battalion of the King's (Liverpool) Regiment as a private. In 1889 he transferred to the 2nd Lancashire Brigade, Royal Artillery, being commissioned as ensign. In 1907 he became lieutenant colonel of the same unit. With the formation of the West Lancashire Territorial Association in 1908, the force became the 1st West Lancashire Brigade Royal Field Artillery (T.A.). He retired from the brigade in 1911, but was appointed to command the artillery of the West Lancashire Division in 1915 as a temporary colonel. In 1917 he was promoted to brigadier general.

Between 1905 and 1919 he served as a Conservative councillor for the ward of Everton. He was elected at a by-election in July 1910 as a Conservative Member of Parliament (MP) for Liverpool Kirkdale. He resigned his seat on 11 February 1915 due to military commitments.

Parliament of the United Kingdom
Preceded by Charles McArthur	Member of Parliament for Liverpool Kirkdale; 1910 – 1915	Succeeded by De Fonblanque Pennefather
