= Sir John Pennefather, 1st Baronet =

British politician

Sir John de Fonblanque Pennefather, 1st Baronet, JP (29 March 1856 – 8 August 1933), was a British cotton merchant and Conservative politician.

Pennefather was born at Perth, Western Australia, the son of Kingsmill Pennefather by his second wife Jane Catherine Patricia de Grenier de Fonblanque, eldest daughter of Thomas de Grenier de Fonblanque, British Consul-General and chargé d'affaires in Serbia and Joan Catherine Barrington, and granddaughter of Sir Jonah Barrington. His Pennefather family was of Irish origin and his first cousin twice removed was Richard Pennefather.

He was returned to Parliament for Kirkdale division of Liverpool at a by-election in February 1915, and held the seat until he stood down from the House of Commons at the 1929 general election.

In 1923 he adopted the first name of John, and in 1924 he was created a Baronet, of Golden in the County of Tipperary. He was also a justice of the peace for Hertfordshire.

== Estate ==
Sir John Pennefather resided at Markyate Cell park, but in 1924 he also bought Eastwell Park, disliking the size and the architectural style of the house, he demolished the former royal mansion in 1925 and rebuilt it as Eastwell Manor, his interest was to create a charming mock Elizabethan house to suit the local history, but the new house resembled almost a copy of his house at Markyate Cell. Pennefather's health decline and he went blind by 1928, so he sold Eastwell Manor alongside Markyarte Cell.

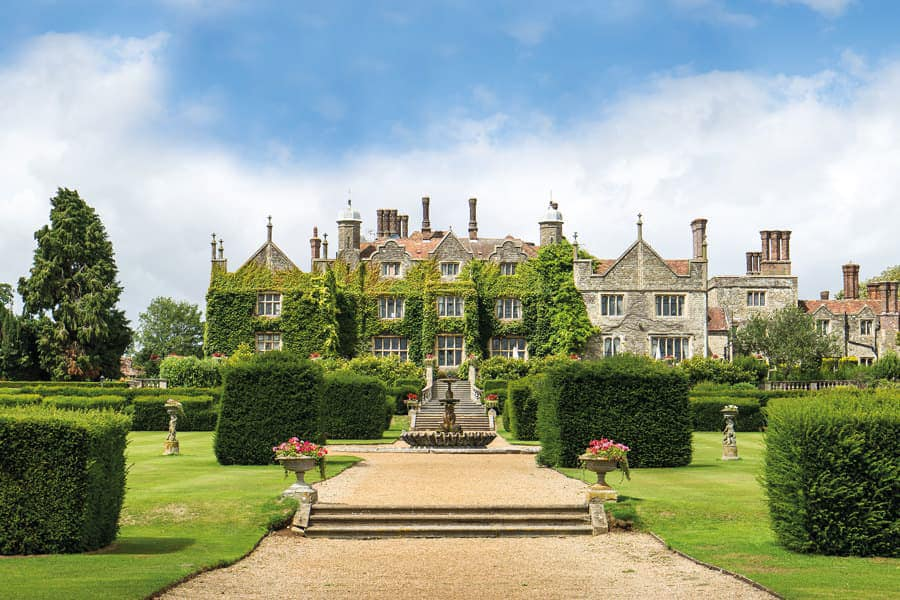
Eastwell Manor, Ashford, Kent

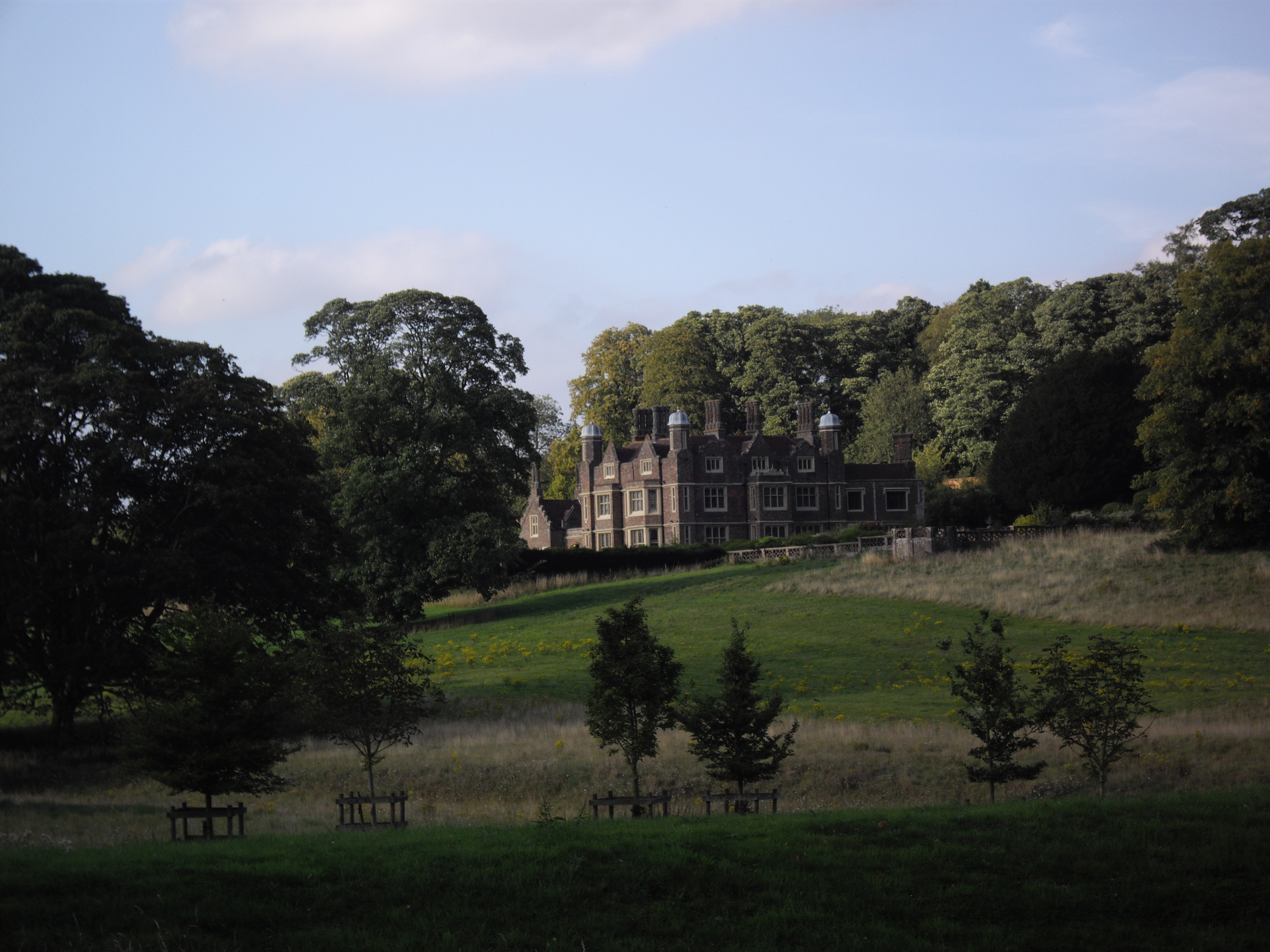
Markyate Cell Park

Pennefather married Madeline Emily Melesina Stewart, daughter of Sir Robert Prescott Stewart on 28 April 1886. They had no children. He died on 8 August 1933, aged 77, at which time the baronetcy became extinct.

Parliament of the United Kingdom
Preceded by Gerald Kyffin-Taylor	Member of Parliament for Kirkdale; 1915–1929	Succeeded by Elijah Sandham
Baronetage of the United Kingdom
New creation	Baronet (of Golden); 1924–1933	Extinct
