= List of United Kingdom Parliament constituencies (1885–1918) by region =

1801 to 1832
1832 to 1868
1868 to 1885
1885 to 1918
1918 to 1945
1950 to 1974
1974 to 1983
1983 to 1997
1997 to 2024
2024 to present

== South West (51) ==
=== Cornwall (7) ===
Constituency	1885	1886	1892	1895	1900	1906	Jan 1910	Dec 1910
Bodmin	Liberal	Liberal Unionist	Liberal Unionist	Liberal Unionist	Liberal Unionist	Liberal	Liberal	Liberal Unionist
Camborne	Independent Liberal	Liberal	Liberal	Liberal Unionist	Liberal	Liberal	Liberal	Liberal
Launceston	Liberal	Liberal	Liberal	Liberal	Liberal	Liberal	Liberal	Liberal
Penryn and Falmouth	Liberal	Conservative	Conservative	Liberal	Liberal	Liberal	Conservative	Conservative
St Austell	Liberal	Liberal	Liberal	Liberal	Liberal	Liberal	Liberal	Liberal
St Ives	Liberal	Liberal Unionist	Liberal Unionist	Liberal Unionist	Liberal Unionist	Liberal	Liberal	Liberal
Truro	Liberal	Liberal Unionist	Liberal Unionist	Liberal Unionist	Liberal Unionist	Liberal	Liberal	Liberal

=== Devon (13) ===
Constituency	1885	1886	1892	1895	1900	1906	Jan 1910	Dec 1910
Ashburton	Liberal	Liberal	Liberal	Liberal	Liberal	Liberal	Liberal	Conservative
Barnstaple	Liberal	Liberal Unionist	Liberal	Liberal Unionist	Liberal	Liberal	Liberal	Liberal
Devonport (Two members)	Conservative	Conservative	Liberal	Liberal	Liberal	Liberal	Conservative	Conservative
Devonport (Two members)	Conservative	Conservative	Liberal	Liberal	Liberal	Liberal	Conservative	Conservative
Exeter	Conservative	Conservative	Conservative	Conservative	Conservative	Liberal	Conservative	Conservative
Honiton	Conservative	Conservative	Conservative	Conservative	Conservative	Conservative	Conservative	Conservative
Plymouth (Two members)	Conservative	Conservative	Conservative	Conservative	Conservative	Liberal	Liberal	Conservative
Plymouth (Two members)	Conservative	Conservative	Conservative	Liberal	Conservative	Liberal	Liberal	Conservative
South Molton	Liberal	Liberal Unionist	Liberal	Liberal	Liberal	Liberal	Liberal	Liberal
Tavistock	Liberal	Liberal Unionist	Liberal	Liberal	Liberal Unionist	Liberal	Liberal	Liberal Unionist
Tiverton	Conservative	Conservative	Conservative	Conservative	Conservative	Conservative	Conservative	Conservative
Torquay	Liberal	Conservative	Conservative	Conservative	Liberal	Liberal	Liberal	Liberal Unionist
Totnes	Liberal	Liberal Unionist	Liberal Unionist	Liberal Unionist	Liberal Unionist	Liberal Unionist	Liberal Unionist	Liberal Unionist

=== Somerset (10) ===
Constituency	1885	1886	1892	1895	1900	1906	Jan 1910	Dec 1910
Bath (Two members)	Conservative	Liberal Unionist	Conservative	Conservative	Conservative	Liberal	Conservative	Conservative
Bath (Two members)	Liberal	Conservative	Liberal Unionist	Liberal Unionist	Liberal Unionist	Liberal	Conservative	Conservative
Bridgwater	Conservative	Conservative	Conservative	Conservative	Conservative	Liberal	Conservative	Conservative
Frome	Liberal	Conservative	Liberal	Conservative	Liberal	Liberal	Liberal	Liberal
Somerset Eastern	Liberal	Liberal Unionist	Liberal Unionist	Liberal Unionist	Liberal Unionist	Liberal	Liberal Unionist	Liberal Unionist
Somerset Northern	Conservative	Conservative	Liberal	Conservative	Conservative	Liberal	Liberal	Liberal
Somerset Southern	Liberal	Liberal	Liberal	Liberal	Liberal	Liberal	Liberal	Liberal
Taunton	Conservative	Conservative	Conservative	Conservative	Conservative	Conservative	Conservative	Conservative
Wellington (Somerset)	Liberal	Conservative	Conservative	Conservative	Conservative	Conservative	Conservative	Conservative
Wells	Conservative	Conservative	Conservative	Conservative	Conservative	Liberal	Conservative	Conservative

=== Dorset (4) ===
Constituency	1885	1886	1892	1895	1900	1906	Jan 1910	Dec 1910
Dorset East	Liberal	Conservative	Conservative	Conservative	Conservative	Liberal	Liberal	Liberal
Dorset North	Liberal	Liberal	Conservative	Conservative	Conservative	Liberal	Conservative	Conservative
Dorset South	Liberal	Conservative	Conservative	Conservative	Conservative	Liberal	Conservative	Conservative
Dorset West	Conservative	Conservative	Conservative	Conservative	Conservative	Conservative	Conservative	Conservative

=== Gloucestershire (11) ===
Constituency	1885	1886	1892	1895	1900	1906	Jan 1910	Dec 1910
Bristol East	Liberal	Liberal	Liberal	Liberal	Liberal	Liberal	Liberal	Liberal
Bristol North	Liberal	Liberal Unionist	Liberal	Liberal Unionist	Liberal Unionist	Liberal	Liberal	Liberal
Bristol South	Liberal	Conservative	Conservative	Conservative	Conservative	Liberal	Liberal	Liberal
Bristol West	Conservative	Conservative	Conservative	Conservative	Conservative	Conservative	Conservative	Conservative
Cheltenham	Conservative	Conservative	Conservative	Conservative	Conservative	Liberal	Conservative	Liberal
Cirencester	Liberal	Liberal Unionist	Liberal	Conservative	Conservative	Liberal	Conservative	Conservative
Forest of Dean	Liberal	Liberal	Liberal	Liberal	Liberal	Liberal	Liberal	Liberal
Gloucester	Liberal	Liberal	Liberal	Liberal Unionist	Liberal	Liberal	Conservative	Conservative
Stroud	Liberal	Conservative	Liberal	Conservative	Liberal	Liberal	Liberal	Liberal
Tewkesbury	Conservative	Conservative	Conservative	Conservative	Conservative	Conservative	Conservative	Conservative
Thornbury	Liberal	Conservative	Conservative	Conservative	Conservative	Liberal	Liberal	Liberal

=== Wiltshire (6) ===
Constituency	1885	1886	1892	1895	1900	1906	Jan 1910	Dec 1910
Chippenham	Liberal	Conservative	Conservative	Conservative	Conservative	Liberal	Conservative	Conservative
Cricklade	Liberal	Liberal Unionist	Liberal	Liberal Unionist	Liberal	Liberal	Liberal Unionist	Liberal
Devizes	Conservative	Conservative	Liberal	Conservative	Conservative	Liberal	Conservative	Conservative
Salisbury	Liberal	Conservative	Conservative	Conservative	Conservative	Liberal	Conservative	Conservative
Westbury	Liberal	Liberal	Liberal	Conservative	Liberal	Liberal	Liberal	Liberal
Wilton	Liberal	Liberal Unionist	Conservative	Conservative	Conservative	Liberal	Conservative	Conservative

== South East England (148) ==
=== Oxfordshire (4) ===
Constituency	1885	1886	1892	1895	1900	1906	Jan 1910	Dec 1910
Banbury	Liberal	Liberal	Liberal	Conservative	Conservative	Liberal	Conservative	Liberal
Henley	Conservative	Conservative	Conservative	Conservative	Conservative	Liberal	Conservative	Conservative
Oxford	Conservative	Conservative	Conservative	Conservative	Conservative	Conservative	Conservative	Conservative
Woodstock	Liberal	Liberal Unionist	Liberal	Conservative	Conservative	Liberal	Conservative	Conservative

=== Buckinghamshire (3) ===
Constituency	1885	1886	1892	1895	1900	1906	Jan 1910	Dec 1910
Aylesbury	Liberal	Liberal Unionist	Liberal Unionist	Liberal Unionist	Liberal Unionist	Liberal Unionist	Liberal Unionist	Liberal Unionist
Buckingham	Liberal	Conservative	Liberal	Conservative	Conservative	Liberal	Liberal	Liberal
Wycombe	Conservative	Conservative	Conservative	Conservative	Conservative	Liberal	Conservative	Conservative

=== Berkshire (5) ===
Constituency	1885	1886	1892	1895	1900	1906	Jan 1910	Dec 1910
Abingdon	Conservative	Conservative	Conservative	Conservative	Conservative	Liberal	Conservative	Conservative
Newbury	Conservative	Conservative	Conservative	Conservative	Conservative	Liberal	Conservative	Conservative
Reading	Conservative	Conservative	Liberal	Conservative	Liberal	Liberal	Liberal	Liberal
Windsor	Conservative	Conservative	Conservative	Conservative	Conservative	Conservative	Conservative	Conservative
Wokingham	Conservative	Conservative	Conservative	Conservative	Conservative	Conservative	Conservative	Conservative

=== Hampshire (11) ===
Constituency	1885	1886	1892	1895	1900	1906	Jan 1910	Dec 1910
Andover	Conservative	Conservative	Conservative	Conservative	Conservative	Conservative	Conservative	Conservative
Basingstoke	Conservative	Conservative	Conservative	Conservative	Conservative	Conservative	Conservative	Conservative
Christchurch	Conservative	Conservative	Conservative	Conservative	Conservative	Liberal	Conservative	Conservative
Fareham	Conservative	Conservative	Conservative	Conservative	Conservative	Conservative	Conservative	Conservative
New Forest	Conservative	Conservative	Conservative	Conservative	Conservative	Liberal	Conservative	Conservative
Petersfield	Liberal	Liberal Unionist	Conservative	Conservative	Conservative	Conservative	Conservative	Conservative
Portsmouth (Two members)	Liberal	Liberal Unionist	Liberal	Liberal	Conservative	Liberal	Conservative	Conservative
Portsmouth (Two members)	Liberal	Conservative	Liberal	Liberal	Conservative	Liberal	Liberal Unionist	Liberal Unionist
Southampton (Two members)	Conservative	Conservative	Conservative	Conservative	Conservative	Liberal	Liberal	Liberal
Southampton (Two members)	Conservative	Conservative	Liberal	Liberal Unionist	Liberal Unionist	Liberal	Liberal	Liberal
Winchester	Conservative	Conservative	Conservative	Conservative	Conservative	Conservative	Conservative	Conservative

=== Isle of Wight (1) ===
Constituency	1885	1886	1892	1895	1900	1906	Jan 1910	Dec 1910
Isle of Wight	Conservative	Conservative	Conservative	Conservative	Conservative	Liberal	Conservative	Conservative

=== Surrey (7) ===
Constituency	1885	1886	1892	1895	1900	1906	Jan 1910	Dec 1910
Chertsey	Conservative	Conservative	Conservative	Conservative	Conservative	Liberal	Conservative	Conservative
Croydon	Conservative	Conservative	Conservative	Conservative	Conservative	Liberal Unionist	Conservative	Conservative
Epsom	Conservative	Conservative	Conservative	Conservative	Conservative	Conservative	Conservative	Conservative
Guildford	Conservative	Conservative	Conservative	Conservative	Conservative	Liberal	Conservative	Conservative
Kingston upon Thames	Conservative	Conservative	Conservative	Conservative	Conservative	Conservative	Conservative	Conservative
Reigate	Conservative	Conservative	Conservative	Conservative	Conservative	Liberal	Conservative	Conservative
Wimbledon	Conservative	Conservative	Conservative	Conservative	Conservative	Conservative	Conservative	Conservative

=== Sussex (9) ===
Constituency	1885	1886	1892	1895	1900	1906	Jan 1910	Dec 1910
Brighton (Two members)	Conservative	Conservative	Conservative	Conservative	Conservative	Liberal	Conservative	Conservative
Brighton (Two members)	Conservative	Conservative	Conservative	Conservative	Conservative	Liberal	Conservative	Conservative
Chichester	Conservative	Conservative	Conservative	Conservative	Conservative	Conservative	Conservative	Conservative
East Grinstead	Conservative	Conservative	Conservative	Conservative	Conservative	Liberal	Conservative	Conservative
Eastbourne	Conservative	Conservative	Conservative	Conservative	Conservative	Liberal	Conservative	Conservative
Hastings	Liberal	Conservative	Conservative	Conservative	Liberal	Conservative	Conservative	Conservative
Horsham	Conservative	Conservative	Conservative	Conservative	Conservative	Conservative	Conservative	Conservative
Lewes	Conservative	Conservative	Conservative	Conservative	Conservative	Conservative	Conservative	Conservative
Rye	Conservative	Conservative	Conservative	Conservative	Conservative	Conservative	Conservative	Conservative

=== Kent (15) ===
Constituency	1885	1886	1892	1895	1900	1906	Jan 1910	Dec 1910
Ashford	Conservative	Conservative	Conservative	Conservative	Conservative	Conservative	Conservative	Conservative
Canterbury	Conservative	Conservative	Conservative	Conservative	Conservative	Conservative	Conservative	Ind. Conservative
Chatham	Conservative	Conservative	Conservative	Conservative	Conservative	Labour	Conservative	Conservative
Dartford	Conservative	Conservative	Conservative	Conservative	Conservative	Liberal-Labour	Conservative	Liberal-Labour
Dover	Conservative	Conservative	Conservative	Conservative	Conservative	Conservative	Conservative	Conservative
Faversham	Conservative	Conservative	Conservative	Conservative	Conservative	Liberal	Conservative	Conservative
Gravesend	Conservative	Conservative	Conservative	Conservative	Conservative	Conservative	Conservative	Conservative
Hythe	Independent Liberal	Liberal Unionist	Independent Liberal	Conservative	Conservative	Conservative	Conservative	Conservative
Isle of Thanet	Conservative	Conservative	Conservative	Conservative	Conservative	Conservative	Conservative	Conservative
Maidstone	Conservative	Conservative	Conservative	Conservative	Liberal	Conservative	Conservative	Conservative
Medway	Conservative	Conservative	Conservative	Conservative	Conservative	Conservative	Conservative	Conservative
Rochester	Conservative	Conservative	Conservative	Conservative	Conservative	Liberal	Conservative	Liberal
St Augustine's	Conservative	Conservative	Conservative	Conservative	Conservative	Conservative	Conservative	Conservative
Sevenoaks	Conservative	Conservative	Conservative	Conservative	Conservative	Conservative	Conservative	Conservative
Tunbridge	Conservative	Conservative	Conservative	Conservative	Conservative	Liberal	Conservative	Conservative

=== Middlesex (7) ===
Constituency	1885	1886	1892	1895	1900	1906	Jan 1910	Dec 1910
Brentford	Conservative	Conservative	Conservative	Conservative	Conservative	Liberal	Conservative	Conservative
Ealing	Conservative	Conservative	Conservative	Conservative	Conservative	Conservative	Conservative	Conservative
Enfield	Conservative	Conservative	Conservative	Conservative	Conservative	Liberal	Conservative	Conservative
Harrow	Conservative	Conservative	Conservative	Conservative	Conservative	Liberal	Conservative	Conservative
Hornsey	Conservative	Conservative	Conservative	Conservative	Conservative	Conservative	Conservative	Conservative
Tottenham	Conservative	Conservative	Conservative	Conservative	Conservative	Liberal	Liberal	Liberal
Uxbridge	Conservative	Conservative	Conservative	Conservative	Conservative	Conservative	Conservative	Conservative

=== County of London (58) ===
This county was formed in 1889: before that these constituencies formed part of Middlesex, Surrey or Kent.

Constituency	1885	1886	1892	1895	1900	1906	Jan 1910	Dec 1910
Battersea	Liberal	Liberal	Independent Labour	Liberal-Labour	Liberal-Labour	Liberal-Labour	Liberal-Labour	Liberal-Labour
Bermondsey	Liberal	Conservative	Liberal	Conservative	Conservative	Liberal	Liberal	Liberal
Bethnal Green North East	Liberal-Labour	Liberal-Labour	Liberal-Labour	Conservative	Conservative	Liberal	Liberal	Liberal
Bethnal Green South West	Liberal	Liberal	Liberal	Liberal	Conservative	Liberal	Liberal	Liberal
Bow and Bromley	Liberal	Conservative	Liberal	Conservative	Conservative	Liberal	Conservative	Labour
Brixton	Conservative	Conservative	Conservative	Conservative	Conservative	Liberal	Conservative	Conservative
Camberwell North	Liberal	Conservative	Liberal	Conservative	Liberal	Liberal	Liberal	Liberal
Chelsea	Liberal	Conservative	Conservative	Conservative	Conservative	Liberal	Conservative	Conservative
Clapham	Liberal	Conservative	Conservative	Conservative	Conservative	Conservative	Conservative	Conservative
Deptford	Conservative	Conservative	Conservative	Conservative	Conservative	Labour	Labour	Labour
Dulwich	Conservative	Conservative	Conservative	Conservative	Conservative	Conservative	Conservative	Conservative
Finsbury Central	Liberal	Conservative	Liberal	Conservative	Conservative	Liberal-Labour	Conservative	Conservative
Finsbury East	Conservative	Liberal-Labour	Liberal-Labour	Conservative	Conservative	Liberal	Liberal	Liberal
Fulham	Conservative	Conservative	Conservative	Conservative	Conservative	Liberal	Conservative	Conservative
Greenwich	Conservative	Conservative	Conservative	Conservative	Conservative	Liberal	Conservative	Conservative
Hackney Central	Conservative	Conservative	Conservative	Conservative	Conservative	Liberal	Liberal	Liberal
Hackney North	Conservative	Conservative	Conservative	Conservative	Conservative	Liberal	Conservative	Conservative
Hackney South	Liberal	Liberal	Liberal	Conservative	Conservative	Liberal	Liberal	Liberal
Haggerston	Liberal-Labour	Liberal-Labour	Liberal-Labour	Conservative	Liberal-Labour	Liberal-Labour	Liberal	Liberal
Hammersmith	Conservative	Conservative	Conservative	Conservative	Conservative	Conservative	Conservative	Conservative
Hampstead	Conservative	Conservative	Conservative	Conservative	Conservative	Conservative	Conservative	Conservative
Holborn	Conservative	Conservative	Conservative	Conservative	Conservative	Conservative	Conservative	Conservative
Hoxton	Liberal	Liberal	Liberal	Liberal	Conservative	Conservative	Liberal	Liberal
Islington East	Liberal	Conservative	Conservative	Conservative	Conservative	Liberal	Liberal	Liberal
Islington North	Conservative	Conservative	Conservative	Conservative	Conservative	Liberal	Liberal	Conservative
Islington South	Liberal	Conservative	Conservative	Conservative	Conservative	Liberal	Liberal	Liberal
Islington West	Liberal	Liberal Unionist	Liberal	Liberal	Liberal	Liberal	Liberal	Liberal
Kennington	Conservative	Conservative	Liberal	Conservative	Conservative	Liberal	Liberal	Liberal
Kensington North	Conservative	Conservative	Liberal	Conservative	Conservative	Liberal	Conservative	Conservative
Kensington South	Conservative	Conservative	Conservative	Conservative	Conservative	Conservative	Conservative	Conservative
Lambeth North	Conservative	Conservative	Liberal	Liberal Unionist	Conservative	Liberal	Conservative	Conservative
Lewisham	Conservative	Conservative	Conservative	Conservative	Conservative	Conservative	Conservative	Conservative
Limehouse	Conservative	Conservative	Liberal	Conservative	Conservative	Liberal	Liberal	Liberal
City of London (Two members)	Conservative	Conservative	Conservative	Conservative	Conservative	Conservative	Conservative	Conservative
City of London (Two members)	Conservative	Conservative	Conservative	Conservative	Conservative	Conservative	Conservative	Conservative
Marylebone East	Conservative	Conservative	Conservative	Conservative	Conservative	Conservative	Conservative	Conservative
Marylebone West	Conservative	Conservative	Conservative	Liberal Unionist	Conservative	Conservative	Conservative	Conservative
Mile End	Conservative	Conservative	Conservative	Conservative	Conservative	Liberal	Liberal Unionist	Liberal Unionist
Newington West	Conservative	Conservative	Liberal	Liberal	Liberal	Liberal	Liberal	Liberal
Norwood	Conservative	Conservative	Conservative	Conservative	Conservative	Conservative	Conservative	Conservative
Paddington North	Conservative	Conservative	Conservative	Conservative	Conservative	Liberal	Conservative	Conservative
Paddington South	Conservative	Conservative	Conservative	Conservative	Conservative	Conservative	Conservative	Conservative
Peckham	Conservative	Conservative	Conservative	Conservative	Conservative	Liberal	Conservative	Liberal
Poplar	Liberal	Liberal	Liberal	Liberal	Liberal	Liberal	Liberal	Liberal
Rotherhithe	Conservative	Conservative	Conservative	Conservative	Conservative	Liberal	Liberal	Liberal
St George, Hanover Square	Conservative	Conservative	Liberal Unionist	Conservative	Conservative	Conservative	Liberal Unionist	Liberal Unionist
St George, Tower Hamlets	Conservative	Conservative	Liberal	Conservative	Conservative	Liberal	Liberal	Liberal
St Pancras East	Liberal	Conservative	Conservative	Conservative	Conservative	Liberal	Liberal-Labour	Liberal-Labour
St Pancras North	Liberal	Conservative	Liberal	Conservative	Conservative	Liberal	Liberal	Liberal
St Pancras South	Liberal	Liberal Unionist	Liberal Unionist	Liberal Unionist	Liberal Unionist	Liberal	Liberal Unionist	Liberal Unionist
St Pancras West	Liberal	Liberal	Conservative	Conservative	Conservative	Liberal	Liberal	Conservative
Southwark West	Liberal	Liberal	Liberal	Liberal	Liberal	Liberal	Conservative	Liberal
Stepney	Liberal	Conservative	Conservative	Conservative	Conservative	Conservative	Conservative	Liberal
Strand	Conservative	Conservative	Conservative	Conservative	Conservative	Conservative	Conservative	Conservative
Walworth	Conservative	Conservative	Liberal	Conservative	Conservative	Liberal	Liberal	Liberal
Wandsworth	Conservative	Conservative	Conservative	Conservative	Conservative	Conservative	Conservative	Conservative
Westminster	Conservative	Conservative	Conservative	Conservative	Conservative	Conservative	Conservative	Conservative
Whitechapel	Liberal	Liberal	Liberal	Liberal	Liberal	Liberal	Liberal	Liberal
Woolwich	Conservative	Conservative	Conservative	Conservative	Conservative	Labour	Conservative	Labour

See https://commons.wikimedia.org/wiki/Category:Locator_maps_of_former_parliamentary_constituencies_of_England_1917

== East Anglia (55) ==
=== Bedfordshire (3) ===
Constituency	1885	1886	1892	1895	1900	1906	Jan 1910	Dec 1910
Bedford	Liberal	Liberal	Liberal	Conservative	Conservative	Liberal	Conservative	Liberal
Biggleswade	Liberal	Liberal Unionist	Liberal	Liberal Unionist	Liberal Unionist	Liberal	Liberal	Liberal
Luton	Liberal	Liberal	Liberal	Liberal	Liberal	Liberal	Liberal	Liberal

=== Hertfordshire (4) ===
Constituency	1885	1886	1892	1895	1900	1906	Jan 1910	Dec 1910
Hertford	Conservative	Conservative	Conservative	Conservative	Conservative	Conservative	Conservative	Conservative
Hitchin	Conservative	Conservative	Conservative	Conservative	Conservative	Liberal	Conservative	Conservative
St Albans	Conservative	Conservative	Conservative	Conservative	Conservative	Conservative	Conservative	Conservative
Watford	Conservative	Conservative	Conservative	Conservative	Conservative	Liberal	Conservative	Conservative

=== Huntingdonshire (2) ===
Constituency	1885	1886	1892	1895	1900	1906	Jan 1910	Dec 1910
Huntingdon	Liberal	Conservative	Conservative	Conservative	Conservative	Liberal	Conservative	Conservative
Ramsey	Conservative	Conservative	Conservative	Conservative	Conservative	Liberal	Conservative	Conservative

=== Cambridgeshire and Isle of Ely (4) ===
Constituency	1885	1886	1892	1895	1900	1906	Jan 1910	Dec 1910
Cambridge	Conservative	Conservative	Conservative	Conservative	Conservative	Liberal	Conservative	Conservative
Chesterton	Conservative	Conservative	Liberal	Conservative	Conservative	Liberal	Liberal	Liberal
Newmarket	Liberal	Liberal	Liberal	Conservative	Conservative	Liberal	Conservative	Liberal
Wisbech	Liberal	Conservative	Liberal	Conservative	Liberal	Liberal	Liberal	Liberal

=== Norfolk (10) ===
Constituency	1885	1886	1892	1895	1900	1906	Jan 1910	Dec 1910
Great Yarmouth	Conservative	Conservative	Liberal	Conservative	Conservative	Conservative	Conservative	Conservative
King's Lynn	Conservative	Conservative	Conservative	Conservative	Conservative	Liberal	Liberal	Conservative
Norfolk East	Conservative	Conservative	Liberal	Liberal	Liberal	Liberal	Liberal	Liberal
Norfolk Mid	Liberal	Liberal Unionist	Liberal	Liberal	Liberal	Liberal	Liberal Unionist	Liberal Unionist
Norfolk North	Liberal	Liberal	Liberal	Liberal	Liberal	Liberal	Liberal	Liberal
Norfolk North West	Liberal-Labour	Conservative	Liberal-Labour	Liberal-Labour	Liberal	Liberal	Liberal	Liberal
Norfolk South	Liberal	Liberal Unionist	Liberal Unionist	Liberal Unionist	Liberal	Liberal	Liberal	Liberal
Norfolk South West	Conservative	Conservative	Conservative	Conservative	Conservative	Liberal	Liberal	Liberal
Norwich (Two members)	Conservative	Liberal	Conservative	Conservative	Conservative	Labour	Liberal	Liberal
Norwich (Two members)	Liberal	Conservative	Liberal	Conservative	Conservative	Liberal	Labour	Labour

=== Suffolk (8) ===
Constituency	1885	1886	1892	1895	1900	1906	Jan 1910	Dec 1910
Bury St Edmunds	Conservative	Conservative	Conservative	Conservative	Conservative	Conservative	Conservative	Conservative
Eye	Liberal	Liberal	Liberal	Liberal	Liberal	Liberal	Liberal	Liberal
Ipswich (Two members)	Liberal	Conservative	Conservative	Liberal	Liberal	Liberal	Liberal	Liberal
Ipswich (Two members)	Liberal	Conservative	Conservative	Conservative	Conservative	Liberal	Liberal	Liberal
Lowestoft	Liberal	Liberal Unionist	Conservative	Conservative	Conservative	Liberal	Conservative	Liberal
Stowmarket	Liberal	Conservative	Liberal	Conservative	Conservative	Liberal	Conservative	Conservative
Sudbury	Liberal	Liberal Unionist	Liberal Unionist	Liberal Unionist	Liberal Unionist	Liberal	Conservative	Conservative
Woodbridge	Liberal	Conservative	Liberal	Conservative	Conservative	Liberal	Conservative	Conservative

=== Essex (11) ===
Constituency	1885	1886	1892	1895	1900	1906	Jan 1910	Dec 1910
Chelmsford	Conservative	Conservative	Conservative	Conservative	Conservative	Conservative	Conservative	Conservative
Colchester	Conservative	Conservative	Conservative	Liberal	Liberal	Liberal	Conservative	Conservative
Epping	Conservative	Conservative	Conservative	Conservative	Conservative	Conservative	Conservative	Conservative
Essex South East	Conservative	Conservative	Conservative	Conservative	Conservative	Liberal	Conservative	Conservative
Harwich	Conservative	Conservative	Conservative	Conservative	Conservative	Liberal	Conservative	Conservative
Maldon	Liberal	Conservative	Liberal	Conservative	Conservative	Liberal	Conservative	Conservative
Romford	Liberal	Conservative	Conservative	Conservative	Conservative	Liberal	Liberal	Liberal
Saffron Walden	Liberal	Liberal	Liberal	Liberal	Liberal	Liberal	Conservative	Liberal
Walthamstow	Liberal	Conservative	Conservative	Conservative	Conservative	Liberal	Liberal	Liberal
West Ham North	Liberal	Conservative	Liberal	Conservative	Conservative	Liberal	Liberal	Liberal
West Ham South	Liberal-Labour	Conservative	Independent Labour	Conservative	Conservative	Labour	Labour	Labour

== West Midlands (55) ==
=== Shropshire (5) ===
Constituency	1885	1886	1892	1895	1900	1906	Jan 1910	Dec 1910
Ludlow	Liberal	Liberal Unionist	Liberal Unionist	Liberal Unionist	Liberal Unionist	Liberal Unionist	Liberal Unionist	Liberal Unionist
Newport	Liberal	Conservative	Conservative	Conservative	Conservative	Conservative	Conservative	Conservative
Oswestry	Conservative	Conservative	Conservative	Conservative	Conservative	Conservative	Conservative	Conservative
Shrewsbury	Conservative	Conservative	Conservative	Conservative	Conservative	Conservative	Conservative	Conservative
Wellington (Salop)	Liberal	Liberal Unionist	Liberal Unionist	Liberal Unionist	Liberal Unionist	Liberal	Liberal	Liberal

=== Staffordshire (17) ===
Constituency	1885	1886	1892	1895	1900	1906	Jan 1910	Dec 1910
Burton	Liberal	Liberal	Liberal	Liberal	Liberal Unionist	Liberal Unionist	Liberal Unionist	Liberal Unionist
Handsworth	Liberal	Liberal Unionist	Liberal Unionist	Liberal Unionist	Liberal Unionist	Liberal Unionist	Liberal Unionist	Liberal Unionist
Hanley	Liberal	Liberal	Liberal	Liberal	Conservative	Liberal-Labour	Labour	Labour
Kingswinford	Conservative	Conservative	Conservative	Conservative	Conservative	Conservative	Conservative	Conservative
Leek	Liberal	Conservative	Conservative	Conservative	Conservative	Liberal	Conservative	Liberal
Lichfield	Liberal	Liberal	Liberal Unionist	Liberal	Liberal	Liberal	Liberal	Liberal
Newcastle-under-Lyme	Liberal	Liberal Unionist	Liberal	Liberal	Liberal Unionist	Liberal	Liberal	Liberal
Stafford	Liberal	Conservative	Liberal	Liberal	Liberal	Liberal	Liberal	Liberal
Staffordshire, North West	Liberal	Conservative	Conservative	Conservative	Conservative	Liberal	Labour	Labour
Staffordshire, West	Liberal	Liberal Unionist	Liberal Unionist	Liberal Unionist	Liberal Unionist	Liberal	Liberal Unionist	Liberal Unionist
Stoke-upon-Trent	Liberal	Liberal	Liberal	Liberal Unionist	Conservative	Liberal-Labour	Liberal-Labour	Liberal-Labour
Walsall	Liberal	Liberal	Conservative	Conservative	Liberal	Liberal	Conservative	Conservative
Wednesbury	Conservative	Liberal	Conservative	Conservative	Conservative	Liberal	Conservative	Conservative
West Bromwich	Liberal	Conservative	Conservative	Conservative	Conservative	Liberal	Conservative	Conservative
Wolverhampton East	Liberal	Liberal	Liberal	Liberal	Liberal	Liberal	Liberal	Liberal
Wolverhampton South	Liberal	Liberal Unionist	Liberal Unionist	Liberal Unionist	Liberal	Liberal	Conservative	Conservative
Wolverhampton West	Conservative	Liberal	Conservative	Conservative	Conservative	Labour	Conservative	Conservative

=== Herefordshire (3) ===
Constituency	1885	1886	1892	1895	1900	1906	Jan 1910	Dec 1910
Hereford	Liberal	Conservative	Liberal	Conservative	Conservative	Conservative	Conservative	Conservative
Leominster	Liberal	Conservative	Conservative	Conservative	Conservative	Liberal	Conservative	Conservative
Ross	Liberal	Liberal Unionist	Liberal Unionist	Liberal Unionist	Liberal Unionist	Liberal	Liberal Unionist	Liberal Unionist

=== Worcestershire (8) ===
Constituency	1885	1886	1892	1895	1900	1906	Jan 1910	Dec 1910
Bewdley	Conservative	Conservative	Conservative	Conservative	Conservative	Conservative	Conservative	Conservative
Droitwich	Liberal	Liberal Unionist	Liberal Unionist	Liberal Unionist	Liberal Unionist	Liberal	Liberal Unionist	Liberal Unionist
Dudley	Liberal	Conservative	Conservative	Conservative	Conservative	Liberal	Liberal	Conservative
Evesham	Conservative	Conservative	Conservative	Conservative	Conservative	Conservative	Conservative	Conservative
Kidderminster	Liberal	Conservative	Conservative	Conservative	Conservative	Liberal	Conservative	Conservative
Worcester	Conservative	Conservative	Conservative	Conservative	Conservative	Conservative	Conservative	Conservative
Worcestershire North	Liberal	Liberal Unionist	Liberal	Liberal Unionist	Liberal Unionist	Liberal	Liberal	Liberal
Worcestershire East	Liberal	Liberal Unionist	Liberal Unionist	Liberal Unionist	Liberal Unionist	Liberal Unionist	Liberal Unionist	Liberal Unionist

=== Warwickshire (14) ===
Constituency	1885	1886	1892	1895	1900	1906	Jan 1910	Dec 1910
Aston Manor	Liberal	Conservative	Conservative	Conservative	Conservative	Conservative	Conservative	Conservative
Birmingham Bordesley	Liberal-Labour	Liberal Unionist	Liberal Unionist	Liberal Unionist	Liberal Unionist	Liberal Unionist	Liberal Unionist	Liberal Unionist
Birmingham Central	Liberal	Liberal Unionist	Liberal Unionist	Liberal Unionist	Liberal Unionist	Liberal Unionist	Liberal Unionist	Liberal Unionist
Birmingham East	Liberal	Conservative	Conservative	Conservative	Conservative	Conservative	Conservative	Conservative
Birmingham Edgbaston	Liberal	Liberal Unionist	Liberal Unionist	Liberal Unionist	Conservative	Conservative	Conservative	Conservative
Birmingham North	Liberal	Liberal Unionist	Liberal Unionist	Liberal Unionist	Liberal Unionist	Liberal Unionist	Liberal Unionist	Liberal Unionist
Birmingham South	Liberal	Liberal Unionist	Liberal Unionist	Liberal Unionist	Liberal Unionist	Liberal Unionist	Liberal Unionist	Liberal Unionist
Birmingham West	Liberal	Liberal Unionist	Liberal Unionist	Liberal Unionist	Liberal Unionist	Liberal Unionist	Liberal Unionist	Liberal Unionist
Coventry	Conservative	Conservative	Liberal	Conservative	Conservative	Liberal	Conservative	Liberal
Nuneaton	Liberal	Conservative	Conservative	Conservative	Conservative	Liberal-Labour	Labour	Labour
Rugby	Liberal	Liberal	Liberal	Conservative	Liberal	Liberal	Conservative	Conservative
Stratford upon Avon	Liberal	Conservative	Conservative	Conservative	Conservative	Liberal	Conservative	Conservative
Tamworth	Conservative	Conservative	Conservative	Conservative	Conservative	Conservative	Conservative	Conservative
Warwick and Leamington	Liberal (Speaker)	Liberal Unionist (Speaker)	Liberal Unionist (Speaker)	Liberal Unionist	Liberal Unionist	Liberal	Conservative	Conservative

== East Midlands (42) ==
=== Derbyshire (9) ===
Constituency	1885	1886	1892	1895	1900	1906	Jan 1910	Dec 1910
Chesterfield	Liberal	Liberal Unionist	Liberal	Liberal	Liberal	Liberal-Labour	Labour	Labour
Derby (Two members)	Liberal	Liberal	Liberal	Conservative	Liberal	Liberal-Labour	Liberal	Liberal
Derby (Two members)	Liberal	Liberal	Liberal	Conservative	Labour	Liberal	Labour	Labour
Derbyshire Mid	Liberal	Liberal	Liberal	Liberal	Liberal	Liberal	Labour	Labour
Derbyshire North East	Liberal	Liberal	Liberal	Liberal	Liberal	Liberal	Labour	Labour
Derbyshire South	Liberal	Liberal	Liberal	Conservative	Conservative	Liberal	Liberal	Liberal
Derbyshire West	Liberal	Liberal Unionist	Liberal Unionist	Liberal Unionist	Liberal Unionist	Liberal Unionist	Liberal Unionist	Liberal Unionist
High Peak	Conservative	Conservative	Conservative	Conservative	Liberal	Liberal	Liberal	Conservative
Ilkeston	Liberal	Liberal	Liberal	Liberal	Liberal	Liberal	Liberal	Liberal

=== Nottinghamshire (7) ===
Constituency	1885	1886	1892	1895	1900	1906	Jan 1910	Dec 1910
Bassetlaw	Conservative	Conservative	Conservative	Conservative	Conservative	Liberal	Conservative	Conservative
Mansfield	Liberal	Liberal	Liberal	Liberal	Liberal	Liberal	Liberal	Liberal
Newark	Conservative	Conservative	Conservative	Conservative	Conservative	Conservative	Conservative	Conservative
Nottingham East	Liberal	Liberal	Liberal	Conservative	Conservative	Liberal	Conservative	Conservative
Nottingham South	Liberal	Conservative	Conservative	Conservative	Conservative	Liberal-Labour	Conservative	Conservative
Nottingham West	Liberal	Liberal-Labour	Liberal Unionist	Liberal	Liberal	Liberal	Liberal	Liberal
Rushcliffe	Liberal	Liberal	Liberal	Liberal	Liberal	Liberal	Liberal	Liberal

=== Leicestershire (6) ===
Constituency	1885	1886	1892	1895	1900	1906	Jan 1910	Dec 1910
Bosworth	Liberal	Liberal	Liberal	Liberal	Liberal	Liberal	Liberal	Liberal
Harborough	Liberal	Conservative	Liberal	Liberal	Liberal	Liberal	Liberal	Liberal
Leicester (Two members)	Liberal	Liberal	Liberal	Liberal-Labour	Liberal-Labour	Liberal-Labour	Liberal	Liberal
Leicester (Two members)	Liberal	Liberal	Liberal	Liberal	Conservative	Labour	Labour	Labour
Loughborough	Liberal	Conservative	Liberal	Liberal	Liberal	Liberal	Liberal	Liberal
Melton	Conservative	Conservative	Conservative	Conservative	Conservative	Liberal	Liberal	Conservative

=== Lincolnshire (11) ===
Constituency	1885	1886	1892	1895	1900	1906	Jan 1910	Dec 1910
Boston	Liberal	Conservative	Liberal	Conservative	Conservative	Liberal	Conservative	Conservative
Brigg	Liberal	Liberal	Liberal	Liberal	Liberal	Liberal	Liberal	Liberal
Gainsborough	Liberal	Conservative	Liberal	Liberal	Conservative	Liberal	Liberal	Liberal
Grantham	Liberal	Conservative	Conservative	Conservative	Liberal	Liberal	Liberal	Liberal
Grimsby	Liberal	Liberal Unionist	Liberal	Liberal	Liberal Unionist	Liberal Unionist	Liberal	Liberal Unionist
Horncastle	Conservative	Conservative	Conservative	Conservative	Conservative	Conservative	Conservative	Conservative
Lincoln	Liberal	Conservative	Liberal	Liberal Unionist	Liberal Unionist	Liberal	Liberal	Liberal
Louth, Lincolnshire	Liberal	Conservative	Liberal	Liberal	Liberal	Liberal	Conservative	Liberal
Sleaford	Conservative	Conservative	Conservative	Conservative	Conservative	Liberal	Conservative	Conservative
Spalding	Conservative	Conservative	Liberal	Liberal Unionist	Liberal	Liberal	Liberal	Liberal
Stamford	Conservative	Conservative	Conservative	Conservative	Conservative	Conservative	Conservative	Conservative

=== Rutland (1) ===
Constituency	1885	1886	1892	1895	1900	1906	Jan 1910	Dec 1910
Rutland	Conservative	Conservative	Conservative	Conservative	Conservative	Conservative	Conservative	Conservative

=== Northamptonshire (7) ===
Constituency	1885	1886	1892	1895	1900	1906	Jan 1910	Dec 1910
Northampton (Two members)	Liberal	Liberal	Liberal	Liberal	Liberal	Liberal	Liberal	Liberal
Northampton (Two members)	Liberal	Liberal	Liberal	Conservative	Liberal	Liberal	Liberal	Liberal
Northamptonshire East	Liberal	Liberal	Liberal	Liberal	Liberal	Liberal	Liberal	Liberal
Northamptonshire Mid	Liberal	Liberal	Liberal	Conservative	Liberal	Liberal	Liberal	Liberal
Northamptonshire North	Conservative	Conservative	Conservative	Conservative	Conservative	Liberal-Labour	Conservative	Conservative
Northamptonshire South	Conservative	Conservative	Liberal	Conservative	Conservative	Liberal	Conservative	Conservative
Peterborough	Independent Liberal	Liberal Unionist	Liberal	Liberal Unionist	Liberal Unionist	Liberal	Liberal	Liberal

== North West England (83) ==
=== Cumberland (6) ===
Constituency	1885	1886	1892	1895	1900	1906	Jan 1910	Dec 1910
Carlisle	Liberal	Liberal	Liberal	Liberal (Speaker)	Liberal (Speaker)	Liberal	Liberal	Liberal
Cockermouth	Conservative	Liberal	Liberal	Liberal	Conservative	Liberal	Conservative	Liberal
Egremont	Conservative	Conservative	Liberal	Conservative	Conservative	Liberal	Conservative	Conservative
Eskdale	Liberal	Liberal	Liberal	Liberal	Conservative	Liberal	Liberal	Conservative
Penrith	Liberal	Conservative	Conservative	Conservative	Conservative	Conservative (Speaker)	Conservative (Speaker)	Conservative (Speaker)
Whitehaven	Conservative	Conservative	Liberal	Conservative	Conservative	Liberal	Conservative	Labour

=== Westmorland (2) ===
Constituency	1885	1886	1892	1895	1900	1906	Jan 1910	Dec 1910
Appleby	Conservative	Conservative	Conservative	Conservative	Liberal	Liberal	Conservative	Conservative
Kendal	Conservative	Conservative	Conservative	Conservative	Conservative	Liberal	Conservative	Conservative

=== Lancashire (57) ===
Constituency	1885	1886	1892	1895	1900	1906	Jan 1910	Dec 1910
Accrington	Liberal	Conservative	Liberal	Liberal	Liberal	Liberal	Liberal	Liberal
Ashton-under-Lyne	Conservative	Conservative	Conservative	Conservative	Conservative	Liberal	Liberal	Conservative
Barrow-in-Furness	Liberal	Liberal Unionist	Conservative	Conservative	Conservative	Labour	Labour	Labour
Blackburn (Two members)	Conservative	Conservative	Conservative	Conservative	Conservative	Conservative	Liberal	Labour
Blackburn (Two members)	Conservative	Conservative	Conservative	Conservative	Conservative	Labour	Labour	Liberal
Blackpool	Conservative	Conservative	Conservative	Conservative	Conservative	Conservative	Conservative	Conservative
Bolton (Two members)	Conservative	Conservative	Conservative	Conservative	Conservative	Liberal	Liberal	Liberal
Bolton (Two members)	Conservative	Conservative	Conservative	Liberal	Liberal	Labour	Labour	Labour
Bootle	Conservative	Conservative	Conservative	Conservative	Conservative	Conservative	Conservative	Conservative
Burnley	Liberal	Liberal Unionist	Liberal	Liberal	Conservative	Liberal-Labour	Conservative	Liberal
Bury	Liberal	Liberal Unionist	Liberal Unionist	Conservative	Conservative	Liberal	Liberal	Liberal
Chorley	Conservative	Conservative	Conservative	Conservative	Conservative	Conservative	Conservative	Conservative
Clitheroe	Liberal	Liberal	Liberal	Liberal	Liberal	Labour	Labour	Labour
Darwen	Conservative	Conservative	Liberal	Conservative	Conservative	Conservative	Liberal	Conservative
Eccles	Conservative	Conservative	Liberal	Conservative	Conservative	Liberal	Liberal	Liberal
Gorton	Liberal	Liberal	Liberal	Conservative	Conservative	Labour	Labour	Labour
Heywood	Liberal	Liberal	Liberal	Liberal Unionist	Liberal Unionist	Liberal	Liberal	Liberal
Ince	Conservative	Conservative	Liberal-Labour	Conservative	Conservative	Labour	Labour	Labour
Lancaster	Conservative	Liberal	Liberal	Conservative	Liberal	Liberal	Liberal	Liberal
Leigh	Liberal	Liberal	Liberal	Liberal	Liberal	Liberal	Liberal	Liberal
Liverpool Abercromby	Conservative	Conservative	Conservative	Conservative	Conservative	Liberal	Conservative	Conservative
Liverpool East Toxteth	Conservative	Conservative	Conservative	Conservative	Conservative	Conservative	Conservative	Conservative
Liverpool Everton	Conservative	Conservative	Conservative	Conservative	Conservative	Conservative	Conservative	Conservative
Liverpool Exchange	Conservative	Liberal	Liberal	Liberal Unionist	Liberal Unionist	Liberal	Liberal	Conservative
Liverpool Kirkdale	Conservative	Conservative	Conservative	Conservative	Conservative	Conservative	Conservative	Conservative
Liverpool Scotland	Irish Nationalist	Irish Nationalist	Irish Nationalist	Irish Nationalist	Irish Nationalist	Irish Nationalist	Irish Nationalist	Irish Nationalist
Liverpool Walton	Conservative	Conservative	Conservative	Conservative	Conservative	Conservative	Conservative	Conservative
Liverpool West Derby	Conservative	Conservative	Conservative	Conservative	Conservative	Conservative	Conservative	Conservative
Liverpool West Toxteth	Conservative	Conservative	Conservative	Conservative	Conservative	Conservative	Conservative	Conservative
North Lonsdale	Conservative	Conservative	Liberal	Liberal Unionist	Liberal Unionist	Conservative	Conservative	Conservative
Manchester East	Conservative	Conservative	Conservative	Conservative	Conservative	Liberal	Labour	Labour
Manchester North	Conservative	Liberal	Liberal	Liberal	Liberal	Liberal	Liberal	Liberal
Manchester North East	Conservative	Conservative	Conservative	Conservative	Conservative	Labour	Labour	Labour
Manchester North West	Conservative	Conservative	Conservative	Conservative	Conservative	Liberal	Liberal	Liberal
Manchester South	Liberal	Liberal	Liberal	Liberal Unionist	Liberal Unionist	Liberal	Liberal	Liberal
Manchester South West	Conservative	Liberal	Liberal	Conservative	Conservative	Labour	Liberal Unionist	Liberal
Middleton	Liberal	Conservative	Liberal	Conservative	Conservative	Liberal	Liberal	Liberal
Newton	Conservative	Conservative	Conservative	Conservative	Conservative	Labour	Labour	Conservative
Oldham (Two members)	Liberal	Conservative	Liberal	Conservative	Liberal	Liberal	Liberal	Liberal
Oldham (Two members)	Conservative	Conservative	Liberal	Conservative	Conservative	Liberal	Liberal	Liberal
Ormskirk	Conservative	Conservative	Conservative	Conservative	Conservative	Conservative	Conservative	Conservative
Preston (Two members)	Conservative	Conservative	Conservative	Conservative	Conservative	Labour	Conservative	Conservative
Preston (Two members)	Conservative	Conservative	Conservative	Conservative	Conservative	Liberal	Conservative	Conservative
Prestwich	Liberal	Conservative	Conservative	Liberal	Liberal	Liberal	Liberal	Liberal
Radcliffe cum Farnworth	Liberal	Liberal	Liberal	Conservative	Liberal	Liberal	Liberal	Liberal
Rochdale	Liberal	Liberal	Liberal	Conservative	Conservative	Liberal	Liberal	Liberal
Rossendale	Liberal	Liberal Unionist	Liberal	Liberal	Liberal	Liberal	Liberal	Liberal
St Helens	Conservative	Conservative	Conservative	Conservative	Conservative	Labour	Labour	Conservative
Salford North	Conservative	Conservative	Liberal	Conservative	Conservative	Liberal-Labour	Liberal-Labour	Liberal-Labour
Salford South	Liberal	Conservative	Conservative	Conservative	Conservative	Liberal	Liberal	Conservative
Salford West	Liberal	Conservative	Conservative	Conservative	Conservative	Liberal	Liberal	Liberal
Southport	Liberal	Conservative	Conservative	Conservative	Conservative	Liberal	Conservative	Conservative
Stretford	Liberal	Conservative	Conservative	Conservative	Conservative	Liberal	Liberal	Liberal
Warrington	Conservative	Conservative	Conservative	Conservative	Conservative	Liberal	Liberal	Conservative
Westhoughton	Conservative	Conservative	Conservative	Conservative	Conservative	Labour	Labour	Labour
Widnes	Conservative	Conservative	Conservative	Conservative	Conservative	Conservative	Conservative	Conservative
Wigan	Conservative	Conservative	Conservative	Conservative	Conservative	Conservative	Labour	Conservative

=== Cheshire (13) ===
Constituency	1885	1886	1892	1895	1900	1906	Jan 1910	Dec 1910
Altrincham	Conservative	Conservative	Conservative	Conservative	Conservative	Liberal	Liberal	Conservative
Birkenhead	Conservative	Conservative	Conservative	Conservative	Conservative	Liberal-Labour	Liberal-Labour	Conservative
Chester	Liberal	Conservative	Conservative	Conservative	Conservative	Liberal	Conservative	Conservative
Crewe	Liberal	Liberal	Liberal	Conservative	Liberal	Liberal	Liberal	Liberal
Eddisbury	Conservative	Conservative	Conservative	Conservative	Conservative	Liberal	Conservative	Conservative
Hyde	Liberal	Conservative	Conservative	Conservative	Conservative	Liberal	Liberal	Liberal
Knutsford	Conservative	Conservative	Conservative	Conservative	Conservative	Liberal	Conservative	Conservative
Macclesfield	Liberal	Conservative	Conservative	Conservative	Conservative	Liberal	Liberal	Liberal
Northwich	Liberal	Liberal Unionist	Liberal	Liberal	Liberal	Liberal	Liberal	Liberal
Stalybridge	Conservative	Conservative	Conservative	Conservative	Conservative	Liberal	Conservative	Conservative
Stockport (Two members)	Conservative	Conservative	Liberal	Conservative	Liberal	Labour	Labour	Liberal
Stockport (Two members)	Conservative	Conservative	Conservative	Conservative	Conservative	Liberal	Liberal	Labour
Wirral	Conservative	Conservative	Conservative	Conservative	Conservative	Liberal	Conservative	Conservative

== North East (28) ==
=== County Durham (16) ===
Constituency	1885	1886	1892	1895	1900	1906	Jan 1910	Dec 1910
Barnard Castle	Liberal	Liberal	Liberal	Liberal	Liberal	Labour	Labour	Labour
Bishop Auckland	Liberal	Liberal	Liberal	Liberal	Liberal	Liberal	Liberal	Liberal
Chester-le-Street	Liberal	Liberal	Liberal	Liberal	Liberal	Independent Labour	Labour	Labour
Darlington	Liberal	Liberal	Liberal	Liberal Unionist	Liberal Unionist	Liberal Unionist	Liberal	Liberal Unionist
Durham	Conservative	Conservative	Liberal	Liberal	Liberal Unionist	Liberal Unionist	Liberal Unionist	Liberal Unionist
Durham Mid	Liberal-Labour	Liberal-Labour	Liberal-Labour	Liberal-Labour	Liberal-Labour	Liberal-Labour	Liberal-Labour	Liberal-Labour
Durham North West	Liberal	Liberal	Liberal	Liberal	Liberal	Liberal	Liberal	Liberal
Durham South East	Liberal	Liberal Unionist	Liberal	Liberal Unionist	Liberal Unionist	Liberal Unionist	Liberal	Liberal
Gateshead	Liberal	Liberal	Liberal	Liberal	Liberal	Liberal-Labour	Liberal	Liberal
The Hartlepools	Liberal	Liberal Unionist	Liberal	Liberal Unionist	Liberal	Liberal	Liberal	Liberal
Houghton-le-Spring	Liberal-Labour	Conservative	Liberal	Liberal	Liberal	Liberal	Liberal	Liberal
Jarrow	Liberal	Liberal	Liberal	Liberal	Liberal	Liberal	Liberal	Liberal
South Shields	Liberal	Liberal	Liberal	Liberal	Liberal	Liberal	Liberal	Liberal
Stockton-on-Tees	Liberal	Liberal	Conservative	Liberal	Conservative	Conservative	Liberal	Liberal
Sunderland (Two members)	Liberal	Liberal	Liberal	Conservative	Conservative	Liberal	Ind. Conservative	Liberal
Sunderland (Two members)	Liberal	Liberal	Liberal	Liberal	Conservative	Labour	Conservative	Labour

=== Northumberland (8) ===
Constituency	1885	1886	1892	1895	1900	1906	Jan 1910	Dec 1910
Berwick-upon-Tweed	Liberal	Liberal	Liberal	Liberal	Liberal	Liberal	Liberal	Liberal
Hexham	Liberal	Liberal	Conservative	Liberal	Liberal	Liberal	Liberal	Liberal
Morpeth	Liberal-Labour	Liberal-Labour	Liberal-Labour	Liberal-Labour	Liberal-Labour	Liberal-Labour	Liberal-Labour	Liberal-Labour
Newcastle upon Tyne (Two members)	Independent Liberal	Liberal	Conservative	Conservative	Conservative	Labour	Liberal	Liberal
Newcastle upon Tyne (Two members)	Liberal	Liberal	Liberal	Conservative	Conservative	Liberal	Labour	Labour
Tynemouth	Conservative	Conservative	Conservative	Conservative	Conservative	Liberal	Liberal	Liberal
Tyneside	Liberal	Liberal	Liberal	Liberal	Liberal Unionist	Liberal	Liberal	Liberal
Wansbeck	Liberal-Labour	Liberal-Labour	Liberal-Labour	Liberal-Labour	Liberal-Labour	Liberal-Labour	Liberal-Labour	Liberal-Labour

== Yorkshire (52) ==
=== York (2) ===
Constituency	1885	1886	1892	1895	1900	1906	Jan 1910	Dec 1910
York (Two members)	Liberal	Liberal	Conservative	Conservative	Conservative	Liberal	Liberal	Conservative
York (Two members)	Liberal	Liberal	Liberal	Liberal	Conservative	Conservative	Conservative	Liberal

=== East Riding (6) ===
Constituency	1885	1886	1892	1895	1900	1906	Jan 1910	Dec 1910
Buckrose	Conservative	Conservative	Liberal	Liberal	Liberal	Liberal	Liberal	Liberal
Holderness	Conservative	Conservative	Conservative	Conservative	Conservative	Conservative	Conservative	Conservative
Howdenshire	Conservative	Conservative	Conservative	Conservative	Conservative	Conservative	Conservative	Conservative
Kingston upon Hull Central	Conservative	Conservative	Conservative	Conservative	Conservative	Conservative	Conservative	Conservative
Kingston upon Hull East	Liberal	Conservative	Liberal	Conservative	Conservative	Liberal	Liberal	Liberal
Kingston upon Hull West	Liberal	Liberal	Liberal	Liberal	Liberal	Liberal	Liberal	Liberal

=== North Riding (6) ===
Constituency	1885	1886	1892	1895	1900	1906	Jan 1910	Dec 1910
Cleveland	Liberal	Liberal	Liberal	Liberal	Liberal	Liberal	Liberal	Liberal
Middlesbrough	Liberal	Liberal	Independent Labour	Liberal-Labour	Conservative	Liberal-Labour	Liberal	Liberal
Richmond (Yorks)	Liberal	Conservative	Conservative	Conservative	Conservative	Liberal	Conservative	Conservative
Scarborough	Conservative	Liberal	Conservative	Liberal	Liberal	Liberal	Liberal	Liberal
Thirsk and Malton	Conservative	Conservative	Conservative	Conservative	Conservative	Conservative	Conservative	Conservative
Whitby	Conservative	Conservative	Conservative	Conservative	Conservative	Conservative	Conservative	Conservative

=== West Riding (38) ===
Constituency	1885	1886	1892	1895	1900	1906	Jan 1910	Dec 1910
Barkston Ash	Conservative	Conservative	Conservative	Conservative	Conservative	Conservative	Conservative	Conservative
Barnsley	Liberal	Liberal	Liberal	Liberal	Liberal	Liberal	Liberal	Liberal
Bradford Central	Liberal	Liberal	Liberal	Liberal Unionist	Liberal Unionist	Liberal	Liberal	Liberal
Bradford East	Liberal	Conservative	Liberal	Conservative	Conservative	Liberal	Liberal	Liberal
Bradford West	Liberal	Liberal	Liberal	Conservative	Conservative	Labour	Labour	Labour
Colne Valley	Liberal	Liberal Unionist	Liberal	Liberal	Liberal	Liberal	Liberal	Liberal
Dewsbury	Liberal	Liberal	Liberal	Liberal	Liberal	Liberal	Liberal	Liberal
Doncaster	Liberal	Liberal	Liberal	Conservative	Conservative	Liberal	Liberal	Liberal
Elland	Liberal	Liberal	Liberal	Liberal	Liberal	Liberal	Liberal	Liberal
Halifax (Two members)	Liberal	Liberal	Liberal	Conservative	Liberal Unionist	Liberal	Liberal	Liberal
Halifax (Two members)	Liberal	Liberal	Liberal	Liberal	Liberal	Labour	Labour	Labour
Hallamshire	Liberal	Liberal	Liberal	Liberal	Liberal	Liberal-Labour	Labour	Labour
Holmfirth	Liberal	Liberal	Liberal	Liberal	Liberal	Liberal	Liberal	Liberal
Huddersfield	Liberal	Liberal	Liberal	Liberal	Liberal	Liberal	Liberal	Liberal
Keighley	Liberal	Liberal	Liberal	Liberal	Liberal	Liberal	Liberal	Liberal
Leeds Central	Conservative	Conservative	Conservative	Conservative	Conservative	Liberal	Liberal	Liberal
Leeds East	Conservative	Liberal	Liberal	Liberal	Conservative	Labour	Labour	Labour
Leeds North	Conservative	Conservative	Conservative	Conservative	Conservative	Liberal	Liberal	Liberal
Leeds South	Liberal	Liberal	Liberal	Liberal	Liberal	Liberal	Liberal	Liberal
Leeds West	Liberal	Liberal	Liberal	Liberal	Liberal	Liberal	Liberal	Liberal
Morley	Liberal	Liberal	Liberal	Liberal	Liberal	Liberal	Liberal	Liberal
Normanton	Liberal-Labour	Liberal-Labour	Liberal-Labour	Liberal-Labour	Liberal-Labour	Liberal-Labour	Labour	Labour
Osgoldcross	Liberal	Liberal	Liberal	Liberal	Independent Liberal	Liberal	Liberal	Liberal
Otley	Liberal	Liberal	Liberal	Conservative	Liberal	Liberal	Liberal	Liberal
Pontefract	Conservative	Conservative	Conservative	Liberal	Liberal	Liberal	Liberal	Liberal
Pudsey	Liberal	Liberal	Liberal	Liberal	Liberal	Liberal	Liberal	Liberal
Ripon	Liberal	Conservative	Conservative	Conservative	Conservative	Liberal	Conservative	Conservative
Rotherham	Liberal	Liberal	Liberal	Liberal	Liberal	Liberal	Liberal	Liberal
Sheffield Attercliffe	Liberal	Liberal	Liberal	Liberal	Liberal	Liberal	Labour	Labour
Sheffield, Brightside	Liberal	Liberal	Liberal	Liberal	Conservative	Liberal	Liberal	Liberal
Sheffield, Central	Conservative	Conservative	Conservative	Conservative	Conservative	Conservative	Conservative	Conservative
Sheffield, Ecclesall	Conservative	Conservative	Conservative	Conservative	Conservative	Conservative	Conservative	Conservative
Sheffield, Hallam	Conservative	Conservative	Conservative	Conservative	Conservative	Conservative	Conservative	Conservative
Shipley	Liberal	Liberal	Liberal-Labour	Liberal Unionist	Liberal Unionist	Liberal	Liberal	Liberal
Skipton	Liberal	Liberal Unionist	Liberal	Liberal Unionist	Liberal	Liberal	Liberal	Liberal
Sowerby	Liberal	Liberal	Liberal	Liberal	Liberal	Liberal	Liberal	Liberal
Spen Valley	Liberal	Liberal	Liberal	Liberal	Liberal	Liberal	Liberal	Liberal
Wakefield	Conservative	Conservative	Conservative	Liberal Unionist	Liberal Unionist	Conservative	Conservative	Liberal

== England non-geographic (5) ==
Constituency	1885	1886	1892	1895	1900	1906	Jan 1910	Dec 1910
Cambridge University (Two members)	Conservative	Conservative	Conservative	Conservative	Conservative	Conservative	Conservative	Conservative
Cambridge University (Two members)	Conservative	Conservative	Conservative	Conservative	Conservative	Conservative	Conservative	Conservative
London University	Liberal	Liberal Unionist	Liberal Unionist	Liberal Unionist	Liberal Unionist	Liberal Unionist	Liberal Unionist	Liberal Unionist
Oxford University (Two members)	Conservative	Conservative	Conservative	Conservative	Conservative	Conservative	Liberal Unionist	Liberal Unionist
Oxford University (Two members)	Conservative	Conservative	Conservative	Conservative	Liberal Unionist	Liberal Unionist	Conservative	Conservative

== Wales (34) ==
=== Anglesey (1) ===
Constituency	1885	1886	1892	1895	1900	1906	Jan 1910	Dec 1910
Anglesey	Liberal	Liberal	Liberal	Liberal	Liberal	Liberal	Liberal	Liberal

=== Caernarvonshire (3) ===
Constituency	1885	1886	1892	1895	1900	1906	Jan 1910	Dec 1910
Arfon	Liberal	Liberal	Liberal	Liberal	Liberal	Liberal	Liberal	Liberal
Caernarvon District	Liberal	Conservative	Liberal	Liberal	Liberal	Liberal	Liberal	Liberal
Eifion	Liberal	Liberal	Liberal	Liberal	Liberal	Liberal	Liberal	Liberal

=== Denbighshire (3) ===
Constituency	1885	1886	1892	1895	1900	1906	Jan 1910	Dec 1910
Denbigh District	Conservative	Conservative	Conservative	Conservative	Conservative	Liberal-Labour	Conservative	Conservative
Denbighshire East	Liberal	Liberal	Liberal	Liberal	Liberal	Liberal	Liberal	Liberal
Denbighshire West	Liberal	Liberal Unionist	Liberal	Liberal	Liberal	Liberal	Liberal	Liberal

=== Flintshire (2) ===
Constituency	1885	1886	1892	1895	1900	1906	Jan 1910	Dec 1910
Flint District	Liberal	Liberal	Liberal	Liberal	Liberal	Liberal	Liberal	Liberal
Flintshire	Liberal	Liberal	Liberal	Liberal	Liberal	Liberal	Liberal	Liberal

=== Merionethshire (1) ===
Constituency	1885	1886	1892	1895	1900	1906	Jan 1910	Dec 1910
Merionethshire	Liberal	Liberal	Liberal	Liberal	Liberal	Liberal	Liberal	Liberal

=== Montgomeryshire (2) ===
Constituency	1885	1886	1892	1895	1900	1906	Jan 1910	Dec 1910
Montgomery District	Conservative	Liberal	Conservative	Conservative	Conservative	Liberal	Liberal	Conservative
Montgomeryshire	Liberal	Liberal	Liberal	Liberal	Liberal	Liberal	Liberal	Liberal

=== Radnorshire (1) ===
Constituency	1885	1886	1892	1895	1900	1906	Jan 1910	Dec 1910
Radnorshire	Conservative	Conservative	Liberal	Conservative	Liberal	Liberal	Conservative	Liberal

=== Breconshire (1) ===
Constituency	1885	1886	1892	1895	1900	1906	Jan 1910	Dec 1910
Breconshire	Liberal	Liberal	Liberal	Liberal	Liberal	Liberal	Liberal	Liberal

=== Cardiganshire (1) ===
Constituency	1885	1886	1892	1895	1900	1906	Jan 1910	Dec 1910
Cardiganshire	Liberal	Liberal	Liberal	Liberal	Liberal	Liberal	Liberal	Liberal

=== Carmarthenshire (3) ===
Constituency	1885	1886	1892	1895	1900	1906	Jan 1910	Dec 1910
Carmarthen District	Liberal	Liberal	Liberal	Liberal Unionist	Liberal	Liberal	Liberal	Liberal
Carmarthenshire East	Liberal	Liberal	Liberal	Liberal	Liberal	Liberal	Liberal	Liberal
Carmarthenshire West	Liberal	Liberal	Liberal	Liberal	Liberal	Liberal	Liberal	Liberal

=== Pembrokeshire (2) ===
Constituency	1885	1886	1892	1895	1900	1906	Jan 1910	Dec 1910
Pembroke and Haverfordwest District	Liberal	Conservative	Liberal	Conservative	Conservative	Liberal	Liberal	Liberal
Pembrokeshire	Liberal	Liberal	Liberal	Liberal	Liberal	Liberal	Liberal	Liberal

=== Glamorganshire (10) ===
Constituency	1885	1886	1892	1895	1900	1906	Jan 1910	Dec 1910
Cardiff District	Liberal	Liberal	Liberal	Conservative	Liberal	Liberal	Liberal	Conservative
Glamorganshire East	Liberal	Liberal	Liberal	Liberal	Liberal	Liberal	Liberal	Liberal-Labour
Glamorganshire Mid	Liberal	Liberal	Liberal	Liberal	Liberal	Liberal	Liberal	Liberal
Glamorganshire South	Liberal	Liberal	Liberal	Conservative	Conservative	Liberal-Labour	Labour	Labour
Gower	Liberal	Liberal	Liberal	Liberal	Liberal	Liberal-Labour	Labour	Labour
Merthyr Tydfil (two members)	Liberal	Liberal	Liberal	Liberal	Liberal	Liberal	Liberal	Liberal
Merthyr Tydfil (two members)	Liberal	Liberal	Liberal	Liberal	Labour	Labour	Labour	Labour
Rhondda	Liberal-Labour	Liberal-Labour	Liberal-Labour	Liberal-Labour	Liberal-Labour	Liberal-Labour	Labour	Labour
Swansea District	Liberal	Liberal Unionist	Liberal	Liberal	Liberal	Liberal	Liberal	Liberal
Swansea Town	Liberal	Liberal	Liberal	Conservative	Liberal	Liberal	Liberal	Liberal

=== Monmouthshire (4) ===
Constituency	1885	1886	1892	1895	1900	1906	Jan 1910	Dec 1910
Monmouth District	Liberal	Conservative	Liberal	Liberal	Conservative	Liberal	Liberal	Liberal
Monmouthshire North	Liberal	Liberal	Liberal	Liberal	Liberal	Liberal	Liberal	Liberal
Monmouthshire South	Conservative	Conservative	Conservative	Conservative	Conservative	Liberal	Liberal	Liberal
Monmouthshire West	Liberal	Liberal	Liberal	Liberal	Liberal	Liberal-Labour	Labour	Labour

== Scotland (70) ==
=== Orkney and Shetland (1) ===
Constituency	1885	1886	1892	1895	1900	1906	Jan 1910	Dec 1910
Orkney and Shetland	Liberal	Liberal	Liberal	Liberal	Liberal Unionist	Liberal	Liberal	Liberal

=== Caithness (2) ===
Constituency	1885	1886	1892	1895	1900	1906	Jan 1910	Dec 1910
Caithness	Ind. Liberal / Crofters'	Liberal	Liberal	Liberal	Liberal	Liberal	Liberal	Liberal
Wick District of Burghs^{1}	Wick Radical Workingmen's Association	Liberal	Liberal Unionist	Liberal Unionist	Conservative	Conservative	Liberal	Liberal

^{1}Comprised six parliamentary burghs: Wick in Caithness; Kirkwall in Orkney; Cromarty, Dingwall and Tain in Ross and Cromarty; Dornoch in Sutherland.

=== Sutherland (1) ===
Constituency	1885	1886	1892	1895	1900	1906	Jan 1910	Dec 1910
Sutherland	Liberal	Liberal	Liberal	Liberal	Liberal Unionist	Liberal	Liberal	Liberal

=== Ross and Cromarty (1) ===
Constituency	1885	1886	1892	1895	1900	1906	Jan 1910	Dec 1910
Ross and Cromarty	Ind. Liberal / Crofters'	Liberal	Liberal	Liberal	Liberal	Liberal	Liberal	Liberal

=== Inverness-shire (2) ===
Constituency	1885	1886	1892	1895	1900	1906	Jan 1910	Dec 1910
Inverness District of Burghs^{1}	Liberal	Liberal Unionist	Liberal	Liberal Unionist	Liberal Unionist	Liberal	Liberal	Liberal
Inverness-shire	Ind. Liberal / Crofters'	Liberal Unionist	Liberal	Conservative	Liberal	Liberal	Liberal	Liberal

^{1}Comprised four parliamentary burghs: Forres in Elginshire, Inverness in Inverness-shire, Nairn in Nairnshire and Fortrose in Ross and Cromarty.

=== Banffshire (1) ===
Constituency	1885	1886	1892	1895	1900	1906	Jan 1910	Dec 1910
Banffshire	Liberal	Liberal	Liberal	Liberal	Liberal	Liberal	Liberal	Liberal

=== Elginshire and Nairnshire (2) ===
Constituency	1885	1886	1892	1895	1900	1906	Jan 1910	Dec 1910
Elgin District of Burghs^{1}	Liberal	Liberal	Liberal	Liberal	Liberal	Liberal	Liberal	Liberal
Elginshire and Nairnshire	Liberal	Liberal	Liberal	Conservative	Conservative	Liberal	Liberal	Liberal

^{1}Comprised five parliamentary burghs: Inverurie, Kintore and Peterhead in Aberdeenshire, Banff and Cullen in Banffshire, and Elgin in Elginshire.

=== Aberdeenshire (4) ===
Constituency	1885	1886	1892	1895	1900	1906	Jan 1910	Dec 1910
Aberdeen North	Liberal	Liberal	Liberal	Liberal	Liberal	Liberal	Liberal	Liberal
Aberdeen South	Liberal	Liberal	Liberal	Liberal	Liberal	Liberal	Liberal	Liberal
Aberdeenshire East	Liberal	Liberal	Liberal	Liberal	Liberal Unionist	Liberal	Liberal	Liberal
Aberdeenshire West	Liberal	Liberal	Liberal	Liberal	Liberal	Liberal	Liberal	Liberal

=== Kincardineshire (1) ===
Constituency	1885	1886	1892	1895	1900	1906	Jan 1910	Dec 1910
Kincardineshire	Liberal	Liberal	Liberal	Liberal	Liberal	Liberal	Liberal	Liberal

=== Forfarshire (4) ===
Constituency	1885	1886	1892	1895	1900	1906	Jan 1910	Dec 1910
Dundee (Two members)	Liberal	Liberal	Liberal	Liberal	Liberal	Liberal	Liberal	Liberal
Dundee (Two members)	Liberal	Liberal	Liberal	Liberal	Liberal	Labour	Labour	Labour
Forfarshire	Liberal	Liberal Unionist	Liberal	Liberal	Liberal	Liberal	Liberal	Liberal
Montrose District of Burghs^{1}	Liberal	Liberal	Liberal	Liberal	Liberal	Liberal	Liberal	Liberal

^{1}Comprised five parliamentary burghs: Arbroath, Brechin, Forfar and Inverbervie in Forfarshire and Montrose in Kincardineshire.

=== Perthshire (3) ===
Constituency	1885	1886	1892	1895	1900	1906	Jan 1910	Dec 1910
Perth	Independent Liberal	Liberal	Conservative	Liberal	Liberal	Liberal	Liberal	Liberal
Perthshire East	Liberal	Liberal	Liberal	Liberal	Liberal	Liberal	Liberal	Liberal
Perthshire West	Liberal	Liberal Unionist	Liberal Unionist	Liberal Unionist	Liberal Unionist	Liberal	Conservative	Conservative

=== Clackmannanshire and Kinross-shire (1) ===
Constituency	1885	1886	1892	1895	1900	1906	Jan 1910	Dec 1910
Clackmannanshire and Kinross-shire	Liberal	Liberal	Liberal	Liberal	Liberal	Liberal	Liberal	Liberal

=== Stirlingshire (3) ===
Constituency	1885	1886	1892	1895	1900	1906	Jan 1910	Dec 1910
Falkirk District of Burghs^{1}	Liberal	Liberal Unionist	Liberal	Liberal Unionist	Liberal Unionist	Liberal	Liberal	Liberal
Stirling District of Burghs^{2}	Liberal	Liberal	Liberal	Liberal	Liberal	Liberal	Liberal	Liberal
Stirlingshire	Liberal	Liberal	Liberal	Conservative	Conservative	Liberal	Liberal	Liberal

^{1}Comprised five parliamentary burghs: Airdrie, Hamilton and Lanark in Lanarkshire, Linlithgow in Linlithgowshire and Falkirk in Stirlingshire.

^{2}Comprised five parliamentary burghs: Dunfermline and Inverkeithing in Fife; Queensferry in Linlithgowshire; Culross in Perthshire and Stirling in Stirlingshire.

=== Fife (4) ===
Constituency	1885	1886	1892	1895	1900	1906	Jan 1910	Dec 1910
Fife East	Liberal	Liberal	Liberal	Liberal	Liberal	Liberal	Liberal	Liberal
Fife West	Liberal	Liberal	Liberal	Liberal	Liberal	Liberal	Liberal	Labour
Kirkcaldy District of Burghs^{1}	Independent Liberal	Liberal	Liberal	Liberal	Liberal	Liberal	Liberal	Liberal
St Andrews District of Burghs^{2}	Independent Liberal	Liberal Unionist	Liberal Unionist	Liberal Unionist	Liberal Unionist	Liberal Unionist	Liberal	Liberal Unionist

^{1}Comprised four parliamentary burghs: Burntisland, Dysart, Kinghorn and Kirkcaldy, all in Fife.

^{2}Comprised seven parliamentary burghs: St Andrews, Anstruther Easter, Anstruther Wester, Crail, Cupar, Kilrenny and Pittenweem, all in Fife.

=== Dunbartonshire (1) ===
Constituency	1885	1886	1892	1895	1900	1906	Jan 1910	Dec 1910
Dunbartonshire	Conservative	Conservative	Liberal	Conservative	Conservative	Liberal	Liberal	Liberal

=== Renfrewshire (4) ===
Constituency	1885	1886	1892	1895	1900	1906	Jan 1910	Dec 1910
Greenock	Liberal	Liberal Unionist	Liberal Unionist	Liberal Unionist	Conservative	Liberal	Liberal	Liberal
Paisley	Liberal	Liberal	Liberal	Liberal	Liberal	Liberal	Liberal	Liberal
Renfrewshire East	Liberal	Conservative	Conservative	Conservative	Conservative	Liberal	Conservative	Conservative
Renfrewshire West	Conservative	Conservative	Conservative	Conservative	Conservative	Liberal	Liberal	Liberal

=== Ayrshire (4) ===
Constituency	1885	1886	1892	1895	1900	1906	Jan 1910	Dec 1910
Ayr Burghs^{1}	Liberal	Liberal Unionist	Liberal	Conservative	Conservative	Conservative	Conservative	Conservative
Ayrshire North	Liberal	Liberal Unionist	Liberal Unionist	Liberal Unionist	Liberal Unionist	Liberal Unionist	Liberal	Liberal
Ayrshire South	Liberal	Liberal Unionist	Liberal	Liberal Unionist	Liberal Unionist	Liberal	Liberal	Liberal
Kilmarnock Burghs^{2}	Conservative	Liberal	Liberal	Conservative	Conservative	Liberal	Liberal	Liberal

^{1}Comprised five parliamentary burghs: Ayr and Irvine in Ayrshire, Campbeltown and Inverary in Argyllshire and Rothesay in Buteshire.

^{2}Comprised five parliamentary burghs: Kilmarnock in Ayrshire; Dumbarton in Dumbartonshire; Rutherglen in Lanarkshire and Renfrew and Port Glasgow in Renfrewshire.

=== Argyll (1) ===
Constituency	1885	1886	1892	1895	1900	1906	Jan 1910	Dec 1910
Argyllshire	Ind. Liberal / Crofters'	Conservative	Liberal	Conservative	Conservative	Liberal	Liberal	Liberal

=== Buteshire (1) ===
Constituency	1885	1886	1892	1895	1900	1906	Jan 1910	Dec 1910
Buteshire	Conservative	Conservative	Conservative	Conservative	Conservative	Liberal	Conservative	Conservative

=== Lanarkshire (13) ===
Constituency	1885	1886	1892	1895	1900	1906	Jan 1910	Dec 1910
Glasgow Blackfriars and Hutchesontown	Liberal	Liberal	Liberal	Liberal	Conservative	Labour	Labour	Labour
Glasgow Bridgeton	Liberal	Liberal	Liberal	Liberal	Conservative	Liberal	Liberal	Liberal
Glasgow Camlachie	Liberal	Liberal	Liberal Unionist	Liberal Unionist	Liberal Unionist	Liberal Unionist	Liberal Unionist	Liberal Unionist
Glasgow Central	Liberal	Conservative	Conservative	Conservative	Conservative	Liberal	Conservative	Conservative
Glasgow College	Liberal	Liberal	Liberal	Conservative	Conservative	Liberal	Liberal	Liberal
Glasgow St. Rollox	Liberal	Liberal Unionist	Liberal	Conservative	Liberal Unionist	Liberal	Liberal	Liberal
Glasgow Tradeston	Liberal	Liberal Unionist	Liberal Unionist	Liberal Unionist	Liberal Unionist	Liberal Unionist	Independent Liberal	Liberal
Govan	Conservative	Conservative	Liberal	Liberal	Liberal	Conservative	Liberal	Liberal
Lanarkshire Mid	Liberal	Liberal	Liberal	Liberal	Liberal	Liberal	Liberal	Liberal
Lanarkshire North East	Liberal	Liberal	Liberal	Liberal	Liberal	Liberal	Liberal	Liberal
Lanarkshire North West	Conservative	Liberal-Labour	Conservative	Liberal	Liberal	Conservative	Liberal	Liberal
Lanarkshire South	Liberal	Conservative	Conservative	Conservative	Conservative	Liberal	Liberal	Liberal
Partick	Liberal	Liberal Unionist	Liberal Unionist	Liberal Unionist	Liberal Unionist	Liberal	Liberal	Liberal

=== Linlithgowshire (1) ===
Constituency	1885	1886	1892	1895	1900	1906	Jan 1910	Dec 1910
Linlithgowshire	Liberal	Liberal	Liberal	Liberal	Liberal	Liberal	Liberal	Liberal

=== Edinburghshire (6) ===
Constituency	1885	1886	1892	1895	1900	1906	Jan 1910	Dec 1910
Edinburgh Central	Independent Liberal	Liberal	Liberal	Liberal	Liberal	Liberal	Liberal	Liberal
Edinburgh East	Independent Liberal	Liberal	Liberal	Liberal	Liberal	Liberal	Liberal	Liberal
Edinburgh South	Independent Liberal	Liberal	Liberal	Liberal Unionist	Liberal Unionist	Liberal	Liberal	Liberal
Edinburgh West	Liberal	Liberal Unionist	Liberal Unionist	Liberal Unionist	Liberal Unionist	Liberal Unionist	Liberal Unionist	Liberal Unionist
Leith District of Burghs^{1}	Liberal	Liberal	Liberal	Liberal	Liberal	Liberal	Liberal	Liberal
Edinburghshire	Liberal	Liberal	Liberal	Liberal	Liberal	Liberal	Liberal	Liberal

^{1}Comprised three parliamentary burghs: Leith, Musselburgh and Portobello, all in the Edinburghshire.

=== Dumfriesshire (2) ===
Constituency	1885	1886	1892	1895	1900	1906	Jan 1910	Dec 1910
Dumfries District of Burghs^{1}	Liberal	Liberal	Liberal	Liberal	Liberal	Liberal	Liberal	Liberal
Dumfriesshire	Liberal	Liberal Unionist	Liberal Unionist	Liberal	Liberal Unionist	Liberal	Liberal	Liberal

^{1}Comprised five parliamentary burghs: Annan, Lochmaben and Sanquhar in Dumfriesshire, Dumfries in Dumfriesshire and Kirkcudbrightshire, and Kirkcudbright in Kirkcudbrightshire.

=== Kirkcudbrightshire (1) ===
Constituency	1885	1886	1892	1895	1900	1906	Jan 1910	Dec 1910
Kirkcudbrightshire	Conservative	Conservative	Conservative	Conservative	Conservative	Liberal	Conservative	Liberal

=== Wigtownshire (1) ===
Constituency	1885	1886	1892	1895	1900	1906	Jan 1910	Dec 1910
Wigtownshire	Conservative	Conservative	Conservative	Conservative	Conservative	Conservative	Conservative	Conservative

=== Roxburghshire (2) ===
Constituency	1885	1886	1892	1895	1900	1906	Jan 1910	Dec 1910
Hawick District of Burghs^{1}	Liberal	Liberal	Liberal	Liberal	Liberal	Liberal	Liberal	Liberal
Roxburghshire	Liberal	Liberal Unionist	Liberal	Conservative	Conservative	Liberal	Liberal	Liberal

^{1}Comprised three parliamentary burghs: Hawick in Roxburghshire and Galashiels and Selkirk in Selkirkshire.

=== Peeblesshire and Selkirkshire (1) ===
Constituency	1885	1886	1892	1895	1900	1906	Jan 1910	Dec 1910
Peeblesshire and Selkirkshire	Liberal	Liberal Unionist	Liberal Unionist	Liberal Unionist	Liberal Unionist	Liberal	Liberal	Liberal

=== Berwickshire (1) ===
Constituency	1885	1886	1892	1895	1900	1906	Jan 1910	Dec 1910
Berwickshire	Liberal	Liberal	Liberal	Liberal	Liberal	Liberal	Liberal	Liberal

=== Haddingtonshire (1) ===
Constituency	1885	1886	1892	1895	1900	1906	Jan 1910	Dec 1910
Haddingtonshire	Liberal	Liberal	Liberal	Liberal	Liberal	Liberal	Liberal	Liberal

=== Non-geographic (2) ===
Constituency	1885	1886	1892	1895	1900	1906	Jan 1910	Dec 1910
Edinburgh and St Andrews Universities	Conservative	Conservative	Conservative	Conservative	Conservative	Conservative	Liberal Unionist	Liberal Unionist
Glasgow and Aberdeen Universities	Conservative	Conservative	Conservative	Conservative	Conservative	Conservative	Conservative	Conservative

== Ulster (33) ==
=== Antrim (8) ===
Constituency	1885	1886	1892	1895	1900	1906	Jan 1910	Dec 1910
Belfast, East Division	Independent Conservative	Irish Unionist	Irish Unionist	Irish Unionist	Irish Unionist	Irish Unionist	Irish Unionist	Irish Unionist
Belfast, North Division	Conservative	Conservative	Irish Unionist	Irish Unionist	Irish Unionist	Irish Unionist	Ulster Unionist	Ulster Unionist
Belfast, South Division	Independent Conservative	Irish Unionist	Irish Unionist	Irish Unionist	Irish Unionist	Independent Unionist	Irish Unionist	Irish Unionist
Belfast, West Division	Conservative	Nationalist	Liberal Unionist	Liberal Unionist	Liberal Unionist	Nationalist	Nationalist	Nationalist
East Antrim	Conservative	Conservative	Irish Unionist	Irish Unionist	Irish Unionist	Irish Unionist	Irish Unionist	Irish Unionist
Mid Antrim	Conservative	Conservative	Irish Unionist	Irish Unionist	Irish Unionist	Irish Unionist	Irish Unionist	Irish Unionist
North Antrim	Conservative	Conservative	Irish Unionist	Irish Unionist	Irish Unionist	Russellite Unionist	Irish Unionist	Irish Unionist
South Antrim	Conservative	Conservative	Irish Unionist	Irish Unionist	Irish Unionist	Irish Unionist	Irish Unionist	Irish Unionist

=== Londonderry (3) ===
Constituency	1885	1886	1892	1895	1900	1906	Jan 1910	Dec 1910
Londonderry City	Conservative	Conservative	Irish Unionist	National Federation	Irish Unionist	Irish Unionist	Irish Unionist	Irish Unionist
North Londonderry	Conservative	Conservative	Irish Unionist	Irish Unionist	Irish Unionist	Irish Unionist	Irish Unionist	Irish Unionist
South Londonderry	Nationalist	Liberal Unionist	Liberal Unionist	Liberal Unionist	Liberal Unionist	Liberal Unionist	Liberal Unionist	Liberal Unionist

=== Tyrone (4) ===
Constituency	1885	1886	1892	1895	1900	1906	Jan 1910	Dec 1910
East Tyrone	Nationalist	Nationalist	National Federation	National Federation	Nationalist	Nationalist	Nationalist	Nationalist
Mid Tyrone	Nationalist	Nationalist	National Federation	National Federation	Nationalist	Nationalist	Irish Unionist	Nationalist
North Tyrone	Conservative	Irish Unionist	Irish Unionist	Liberal	Liberal	Liberal	Liberal	Liberal
South Tyrone	Nationalist	Liberal Unionist	Liberal Unionist	Liberal Unionist	Liberal Unionist	Russellite Unionist	Irish Unionist	Irish Unionist

=== Armagh (3) ===
Constituency	1885	1886	1892	1895	1900	1906	Jan 1910	Dec 1910
Mid Armagh	Conservative	Conservative	Irish Unionist	Irish Unionist	Irish Unionist	Irish Unionist	Irish Unionist	Irish Unionist
North Armagh	Conservative	Conservative	Irish Unionist	Irish Unionist	Irish Unionist	Irish Unionist	Irish Unionist	Irish Unionist
South Armagh	Nationalist	Nationalist	National Federation	National Federation	Healyite Nationalist	Nationalist	Nationalist	Nationalist

=== Down (5) ===
Constituency	1885	1886	1892	1895	1900	1906	Jan 1910	Dec 1910
Newry (partly in Armagh)	Nationalist	Nationalist	National Federation	National Federation	Nationalist	Nationalist	Nationalist	Nationalist
East Down	Conservative	Conservative	Irish Unionist	Irish Unionist	Irish Unionist	Irish Unionist	Irish Unionist	Irish Unionist
North Down	Conservative	Irish Unionist	Irish Unionist	Irish Unionist	Irish Unionist	Irish Unionist	Irish Unionist	Irish Unionist
South Down	Nationalist	Nationalist	National Federation	National Federation	Nationalist	Nationalist	Nationalist	Nationalist
West Down	Conservative	Conservative	Irish Unionist	Irish Unionist	Irish Unionist	Irish Unionist	Irish Unionist	Irish Unionist

=== Fermanagh (2) ===
Constituency	1885	1886	1892	1895	1900	1906	Jan 1910	Dec 1910
North Fermanagh	Nationalist	Nationalist	Irish Unionist	Irish Unionist	Irish Unionist	Irish Unionist	Irish Unionist	Irish Unionist
South Fermanagh	Nationalist	Nationalist	National Federation	National Federation	Nationalist	Nationalist	Nationalist	Nationalist

=== Donegal (4) ===
Constituency	1885	1886	1892	1895	1900	1906	Jan 1910	Dec 1910
East Donegal	Nationalist	Nationalist	National Federation	National Federation	Nationalist	Nationalist	Nationalist	Nationalist
North Donegal	Nationalist	Nationalist	National Federation	National Federation	Nationalist	Nationalist	Nationalist	Nationalist
South Donegal	Nationalist	Nationalist	National Federation	National Federation	Nationalist	Nationalist	Nationalist	Nationalist
West Donegal	Nationalist	Nationalist	National Federation	National Federation	Nationalist	Nationalist	Nationalist	Nationalist

=== Monaghan (2) ===
Constituency	1885	1886	1892	1895	1900	1906	Jan 1910	Dec 1910
North Monaghan	Nationalist	Nationalist	National Federation	National Federation	Nationalist	Nationalist	Nationalist	Nationalist
South Monaghan	Nationalist	Nationalist	National Federation	National Federation	Nationalist	Nationalist	Independent Nationalist	Independent Nationalist

=== Cavan (2) ===
Constituency	1885	1886	1892	1895	1900	1906	Jan 1910	Dec 1910
East Cavan	Nationalist	Nationalist	National Federation	National Federation	Nationalist	Nationalist	Nationalist	Nationalist
West Cavan	Nationalist	Nationalist	National Federation	National Federation	Nationalist	Nationalist	Nationalist	Nationalist

== Connacht (15) ==
=== Galway (5) ===
Constituency	1885	1886	1892	1895	1900	1906	Jan 1910	Dec 1910
Galway Borough	Nationalist	Nationalist	National Federation	National Federation	Irish Unionist	Nationalist	Nationalist	Nationalist
Galway Connemara	Nationalist	Nationalist	National Federation	National Federation	Nationalist	Nationalist	Nationalist	Nationalist
East Galway	Nationalist	Nationalist	National Federation	National Federation	Nationalist	Nationalist	Nationalist	Nationalist
North Galway	Nationalist	Nationalist	National League	National Federation	Nationalist	Nationalist	Nationalist	Nationalist
South Galway	Nationalist	Nationalist	National Federation	National Federation	Nationalist	Nationalist	Nationalist	Nationalist

=== Leitrim (2) ===
Constituency	1885	1886	1892	1895	1900	1906	Jan 1910	Dec 1910
North Leitrim	Nationalist	Nationalist	National Federation	National Federation	Nationalist	Nationalist	Nationalist	Nationalist
South Leitrim	Nationalist	Nationalist	National Federation	National Federation	Nationalist	Nationalist	Nationalist	Nationalist

=== Roscommon (2) ===
Constituency	1885	1886	1892	1895	1900	1906	Jan 1910	Dec 1910
North Roscommon	Nationalist	Nationalist	National Federation	National League	Nationalist	Nationalist	Nationalist	Nationalist
South Roscommon	Nationalist	Nationalist	National League	National League	Nationalist	Nationalist	Nationalist	Nationalist

=== Sligo (2) ===
Constituency	1885	1886	1892	1895	1900	1906	Jan 1910	Dec 1910
North Sligo	Nationalist	Nationalist	National Federation	National Federation	Nationalist	Nationalist	Nationalist	Nationalist
South Sligo	Nationalist	Nationalist	National Federation	National Federation	Nationalist	Nationalist	Nationalist	Nationalist

=== Mayo (4) ===
Constituency	1885	1886	1892	1895	1900	1906	Jan 1910	Dec 1910
East Mayo	Nationalist	Nationalist	National Federation	National Federation	Nationalist	Nationalist	Nationalist	Nationalist
North Mayo	Nationalist	Nationalist	National Federation	National Federation	Nationalist	Nationalist	Nationalist	Nationalist
South Mayo	Nationalist	Nationalist	National Federation	National Federation	Nationalist	Nationalist	All-for-Ireland League	Nationalist
West Mayo	Nationalist	Nationalist	National Federation	National Federation	Nationalist	Nationalist	Nationalist	Nationalist

== Leinster (30) ==
=== Longford (2) ===
Constituency	1885	1886	1892	1895	1900	1906	Jan 1910	Dec 1910
North Longford	Nationalist	Nationalist	National Federation	National Federation	Nationalist	Nationalist	Nationalist	Nationalist
South Longford	Nationalist	Nationalist	National Federation	National Federation	Nationalist	Nationalist	Nationalist	Nationalist

=== Louth (2) ===
Constituency	1885	1886	1892	1895	1900	1906	Jan 1910	Dec 1910
North Louth	Nationalist	Nationalist	National Federation	National Federation	Healyite Nationalist	Healyite Nationalist	All-for-Ireland League	Nationalist
South Louth	Nationalist	Nationalist	National Federation	National Federation	Independent Nationalist	Nationalist	Nationalist	Nationalist

=== King's County (2) ===
Constituency	1885	1886	1892	1895	1900	1906	Jan 1910	Dec 1910
King's County, Tullamore	Nationalist	Nationalist	National Federation	National Federation	Nationalist	Nationalist	Nationalist	Nationalist
King's County, Birr	Nationalist	Nationalist	National Federation	National Federation	Nationalist	Nationalist	Nationalist	Nationalist

=== Queen's County (2) ===
Constituency	1885	1886	1892	1895	1900	1906	Jan 1910	Dec 1910
Queen's County, Leix	Nationalist	Nationalist	National Federation	National Federation	Nationalist	Nationalist	Nationalist	Nationalist
Queen's County, Ossory	Nationalist	Nationalist	National Federation	National Federation	Nationalist	Nationalist	Nationalist	Nationalist

=== Meath (2) ===
Constituency	1885	1886	1892	1895	1900	1906	Jan 1910	Dec 1910
North Meath	Nationalist	Nationalist	National Federation	National Federation	Nationalist	Nationalist	Nationalist	Nationalist
South Meath	Nationalist	Nationalist	National Federation	National League	Healyite Nationalist	Nationalist	Nationalist	Nationalist

=== Westmeath (2) ===
Constituency	1885	1886	1892	1895	1900	1906	Jan 1910	Dec 1910
North Westmeath	Nationalist	Nationalist	National Federation	National Federation	Healyite Nationalist	Nationalist	Independent Nationalist	Independent Nationalist
South Westmeath	Nationalist	Nationalist	National Federation	National Federation	Nationalist	Nationalist	Nationalist	Nationalist

=== Carlow (1) ===
Constituency	1885	1886	1892	1895	1900	1906	Jan 1910	Dec 1910
County Carlow	Nationalist	Nationalist	National Federation	National Federation	Nationalist	Nationalist	Nationalist	Nationalist

=== Dublin (8) ===
Constituency	1885	1886	1892	1895	1900	1906	Jan 1910	Dec 1910
Dublin, College Green Division	Nationalist	Nationalist	National League	National League	Nationalist	Nationalist	Nationalist	Nationalist
Dublin, Harbour Division	Nationalist	Nationalist	National League	National League	Nationalist	Nationalist	Nationalist	Nationalist
Dublin, St Patrick's Division	Nationalist	Nationalist	National League	National League	Nationalist	Nationalist	Nationalist	Nationalist
Dublin, St Stephen's Green Division	Nationalist	Nationalist	Liberal Unionist	Liberal Unionist	Nationalist	Nationalist	Nationalist	Nationalist
North Dublin	Nationalist	Nationalist	National League	National League	Nationalist	Nationalist	Nationalist	Nationalist
South Dublin	Nationalist	Nationalist	Irish Unionist	Irish Unionist	Nationalist	Irish Unionist	Irish Unionist	Nationalist
Dublin University (two MPs)	Conservative	Irish Unionist	Irish Unionist	Irish Unionist	Irish Unionist	Irish Unionist	Irish Unionist	Irish Unionist
Dublin University (two MPs)	Conservative	Irish Unionist	Irish Unionist	Irish Unionist	Liberal Unionist	Irish Unionist	Irish Unionist	Irish Unionist

=== Wicklow (2) ===
Constituency	1885	1886	1892	1895	1900	1906	Jan 1910	Dec 1910
East Wicklow	Nationalist	Nationalist	National Federation	National League	Nationalist	Nationalist	Nationalist	Nationalist
West Wicklow	Nationalist	Nationalist	National Federation	National Federation	Nationalist	Nationalist	Nationalist	Nationalist

=== Kildare (2) ===
Constituency	1885	1886	1892	1895	1900	1906	Jan 1910	Dec 1910
North Kildare	Nationalist	Nationalist	National Federation	National Federation	Nationalist	Nationalist	Nationalist	Nationalist
South Kildare	Nationalist	Nationalist	National Federation	National Federation	Nationalist	Nationalist	Nationalist	Nationalist

=== Kilkenny (3) ===
Constituency	1885	1886	1892	1895	1900	1906	Jan 1910	Dec 1910
Kilkenny City	Nationalist	Nationalist	National Federation	National League	Nationalist	Nationalist	Nationalist	Nationalist
North Kilkenny	Nationalist	Nationalist	National Federation	National Federation	Nationalist	Nationalist	Nationalist	Nationalist
South Kilkenny	Nationalist	Nationalist	National Federation	National Federation	Nationalist	Nationalist	Nationalist	Nationalist

=== Wexford (2) ===
Constituency	1885	1886	1892	1895	1900	1906	Jan 1910	Dec 1910
North Wexford	Nationalist	Nationalist	National Federation	National Federation	Nationalist	Nationalist	Nationalist	Nationalist
South Wexford	Nationalist	Nationalist	National Federation	National Federation	Nationalist	Nationalist	Nationalist	Nationalist

== Munster (25) ==
=== Clare (2) ===
Constituency	1885	1886	1892	1895	1900	1906	Jan 1910	Dec 1910
East Clare	Nationalist	Nationalist	National League	National League	Nationalist	Nationalist	Nationalist	Nationalist
West Clare	Nationalist	Nationalist	National League	National Federation	Nationalist	Nationalist	Nationalist	Nationalist

=== Tipperary (4) ===
Constituency	1885	1886	1892	1895	1900	1906	Jan 1910	Dec 1910
East Tipperary	Nationalist	Nationalist	National Federation	National Federation	Nationalist	Nationalist	Nationalist	Nationalist
Mid Tipperary	Nationalist	Nationalist	National Federation	National Federation	Nationalist	Nationalist	Nationalist	Nationalist
North Tipperary	Nationalist	Nationalist	National Federation	National Federation	Nationalist	Nationalist	Nationalist	Nationalist
South Tipperary	Nationalist	Nationalist	National Federation	National Federation	Nationalist	Nationalist	Nationalist	Nationalist

=== Limerick (3) ===
Constituency	1885	1886	1892	1895	1900	1906	Jan 1910	Dec 1910
Limerick City	Nationalist	Nationalist	National Federation	National League	Nationalist	Nationalist	Nationalist	Nationalist
East Limerick	Nationalist	Nationalist	National Federation	National Federation	Nationalist	Nationalist	Nationalist	Nationalist
West Limerick	Nationalist	Nationalist	National Federation	National Federation	Nationalist	Nationalist	Nationalist	Nationalist

=== Kerry (4) ===
Constituency	1885	1886	1892	1895	1900	1906	Jan 1910	Dec 1910
East Kerry	Nationalist	Nationalist	National Federation	National Federation	Nationalist	Nationalist	Independent Nationalist	Nationalist
North Kerry	Nationalist	Nationalist	National Federation	National Federation	Nationalist	Nationalist	Nationalist	Nationalist
South Kerry	Nationalist	Nationalist	National Federation	National Federation	Nationalist	Nationalist	Nationalist	Nationalist
West Kerry	Nationalist	Nationalist	National Federation	National Federation	Nationalist	Nationalist	Nationalist	Nationalist

=== Cork (9) ===
Constituency	1885	1886	1892	1895	1900	1906	Jan 1910	Dec 1910
Cork (two MPs)	Nationalist	Nationalist	National Federation	National Federation	Nationalist	Nationalist	All-for-Ireland League	All-for-Ireland League
Cork (two MPs)	Nationalist	Nationalist	National Federation	National Federation	Nationalist	Nationalist	Nationalist	All-for-Ireland League
East Cork	Nationalist	Nationalist	National Federation	National Federation	Nationalist	Nationalist	Nationalist	Nationalist
Mid Cork	Nationalist	Nationalist	National Federation	National Federation	Nationalist	Nationalist	All-for-Ireland League	All-for-Ireland League
North Cork	Nationalist	Nationalist	National Federation	National Federation	Nationalist	Nationalist	All-for-Ireland League	All-for-Ireland League
North East Cork	Nationalist	Nationalist	National Federation	National Federation	Nationalist	Nationalist	All-for-Ireland League	All-for-Ireland League
South Cork	Nationalist	Nationalist	National Federation	National Federation	Nationalist	Nationalist	Nationalist	All-for-Ireland League
South East Cork	Nationalist	Nationalist	National Federation	National Federation	Nationalist	Nationalist	All-for-Ireland League	All-for-Ireland League
West Cork	Nationalist	Nationalist	National Federation	National Federation	Nationalist	Nationalist	All-for-Ireland League	All-for-Ireland League

=== Waterford (3) ===
Constituency	1885	1886	1892	1895	1900	1906	Jan 1910	Dec 1910
Waterford City	Nationalist	Nationalist	National League	National League	Nationalist	Nationalist	Nationalist	Nationalist
East Waterford	Nationalist	Nationalist	National Federation	National Federation	Nationalist	Nationalist	Nationalist	Nationalist
West Waterford	Nationalist	Nationalist	National Federation	National Federation	Nationalist	Nationalist	Nationalist	Nationalist
