= Tipperary South =

Tipperary South may refer to:

- South Tipperary, a former county in Ireland
- Tipperary South (Dáil constituency), a former parliamentary constituency represented in Dáil Éireann
- Tipperary South (UK Parliament constituency), a UK Parliament constituency in Ireland
