= Kildare North =

Kildare North or North Kildare may refer to one of two parliamentary constituencies in County Kildare, Ireland:

- Kildare North (Dáil constituency) (since 2002)
- North Kildare (UK Parliament constituency) (1885–1922)

See also

- County Kildare
