= Patrick O'Byrne (politician) =

Irish politician (1870–1944)

Teachta Dála
- In office May 1921 – June 1922
- Constituency: Tipperary Mid, North and South

Personal details
- Born: August 1870 Roscrea, County Tipperary, Ireland
- Died: 20 January 1944 (aged 73) Monkstown, Dublin, Ireland
- Party: Sinn Féin
- Spouse: Bernadette Boland (m. 1897)
- Education: Beaumont College

Patrick Joseph O'Byrne KM (August 1870 – 20 January 1944) was an Irish republican and Sinn Féin politician.

== Politics ==
O'Byrne was elected unopposed as a Sinn Féin Teachta Dála (TD) to the Second Dáil at the 1921 elections for the Tipperary Mid, North and South constituency.

He opposed the Anglo-Irish Treaty and voted against it. He stood as an anti-Treaty Sinn Féin candidate at the 1922 general election but was not elected. He did not follow Éamon de Valera who split from Sinn Féin in 1926 to found the Fianna Fáil party to enter the Dáil.

== Title and family ==
He was the son of was John O'Byrne of Corville, County Tipperary (who had originally been granted the title of Count by the Pope) and his mother was Eleanor von Hübner, the daughter of Austrian diplomat Count Joseph Alexander Hübner. He was a direct descendant of Edward Byrne (c.1739–1804), a wealthy Dublin merchant and Chairman of the Catholic Convention which campaigned for Catholic rights, and his son John Dominick Byrne, who was a member of the United Irishmen.

Patrick O'Byrne married Bernadette Boland in Sneem, County Kerry in 1897. His brother-in-law was John Pius Boland, the Home Rule MP for South Kerry. O'Byrne died in 1944 and is buried in St. Cronan's graveyard, Roscrea, County Tipperary.

Dáil	Election	Deputy (Party)	Deputy (Party)	Deputy (Party)	Deputy (Party)
2nd	1921	Patrick O'Byrne (SF)	Séamus Burke (SF)	Joseph MacDonagh (SF)	P. J. Moloney (SF)
3rd	1922	Daniel Morrissey (Lab)	Séamus Burke (PT-SF)	Joseph MacDonagh (AT-SF)	P. J. Moloney (AT-SF)
4th	1923	Constituency abolished. See Tipperary			
