= Francis Mandeville =

Francis Mandeville (1850 – 2 January 1905) was an Irish nationalist politician and member of parliament (MP) in the House of Commons of the United Kingdom of Great Britain and Ireland.

He was elected as an Irish National Federation (Anti-Parnellite) MP for the South Tipperary constituency at the 1892 general election. He was re-elected at the 1895 general election, but did not contest the 1900 general election.

Parliament of the United Kingdom
Preceded by John O'Connor	Member of Parliament for South Tipperary; 1892 – 1900	Succeeded by John Cullinan
