= Tipperary Mid, North and South =

Dáil constituency (1921–1923)

- Former Dáil constituency
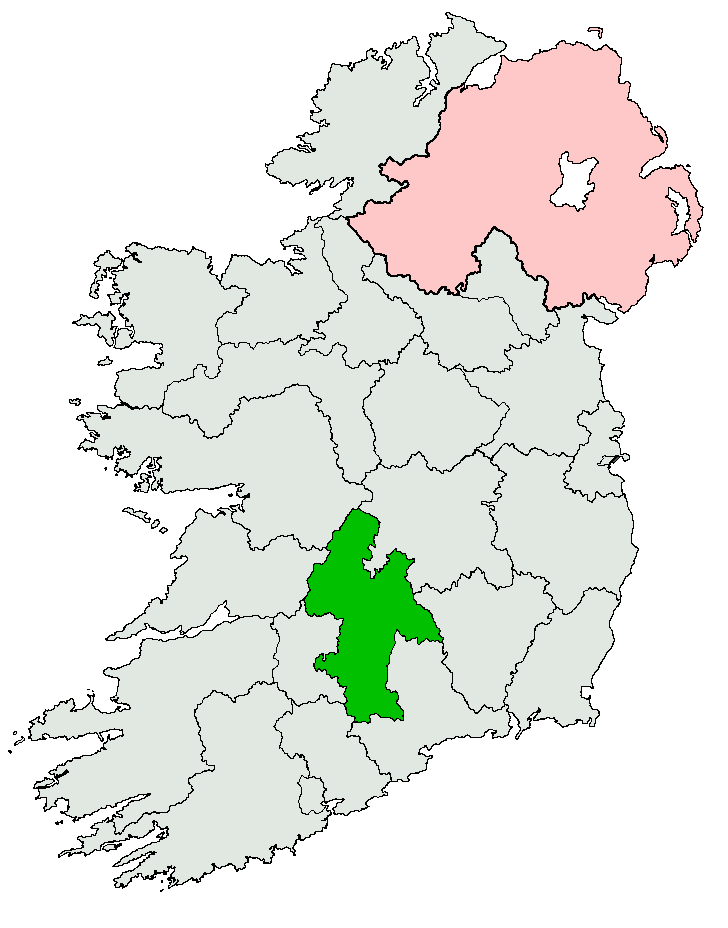
- Location of Tipperary Mid, North and South within Ireland

Former constituency
- Created: 1921
- Abolished: 1923
- Seats: 4
- Local government area: County Tipperary
- Created from: Mid Tipperary; North Tipperary; South Tipperary
- Replaced by: Tipperary

Tipperary Mid, North and South was a parliamentary constituency represented in Dáil Éireann, the lower house of the Irish parliament or Oireachtas, from 1921 to 1923. The constituency elected 4 deputies (Teachtaí Dála, commonly known as TDs) to the Dáil, on the system of proportional representation by means of the single transferable vote (PR-STV).

== History and boundaries ==
The constituency was created in 1921 as a 4-seat constituency, under the Government of Ireland Act 1920, for the 1921 general election to the House of Commons of Southern Ireland, whose members formed the Second Dáil.

It succeeded the constituencies of Tipperary Mid, Tipperary North and Tipperary South which were used to elect the Members of the 1st Dáil and earlier UK House of Commons members.

It was abolished under the Electoral Act 1923, when it was replaced by the new Tipperary constituency which was first used at the 1923 general election to the 4th Dáil.

It covered most of County Tipperary except the eastern parts.

== TDs ==
Teachtaí Dála (TDs) for Tipperary Mid, North and South 1921–1923
Key to parties: SF = Sinn Féin; AT-SF = Sinn Féin (Anti-Treaty); PT-SF = Sinn Féin (Pro-Treaty); Lab = Labour
Dáil	Election	Deputy (Party)	Deputy (Party)	Deputy (Party)	Deputy (Party)
2nd	1921	Patrick O'Byrne (SF)	Séamus Burke (SF)	Joseph MacDonagh (SF)	P. J. Moloney (SF)
3rd	1922	Daniel Morrissey (Lab)	Séamus Burke (PT-SF)	Joseph MacDonagh (AT-SF)	P. J. Moloney (AT-SF)
4th	1923	Constituency abolished. See Tipperary			

Note: The columns in this table are used only for presentational purposes, and no significance should be attached to the order of columns. For details of the order in which seats were won at each election, see the detailed results of that election.

== Elections ==
*: Outgoing TD

=== 1922 general election ===
P. J. Moloney was elected on the second count but figures are not available.

1922 general election: Tipperary Mid, North and South
Party	Candidate	FPv%	Count	
Party	Candidate	FPv%	1	2
Sinn Féin (Pro-Treaty)	Séamus Burke	32.5	9,309	
Labour	Daniel Morrissey	27.3	7,819	
Sinn Féin (Anti-Treaty)	Joseph MacDonagh	20.8	5,962	
Sinn Féin (Anti-Treaty)	P. J. Moloney	17.3	4,960	N/A
Sinn Féin (Anti-Treaty)	Patrick O'Byrne	2.1	586	N/A
Electorate: 51,692 Valid: 28,636 Quota: 5,728 Turnout: 55.4%

=== 1921 general election ===
At the 1921 general election, only four candidates were nominated in Tipperary Mid, North and South. Since this was the same as the number of seats, no ballot was needed, and all candidates were returned unopposed.

1921 general election: Tipperary Mid, North and South (uncontested)
Party	Candidate
Sinn Féin	Séamus Burke
Sinn Féin	Joseph MacDonagh
Sinn Féin	P. J. Moloney
Sinn Féin	Patrick O'Byrne

== See also ==
- Dáil constituencies
- Politics of the Republic of Ireland
- Historic Dáil constituencies
- Elections in the Republic of Ireland
