= John O'Connor (North Kildare MP) =

Irish politician (1850–1928)

John O'Connor KC (10 October 1850 – 27 October 1928) was an Irish Nationalist revolutionary-turned Irish Parliamentary Party parliamentarian MP in the House of Commons of the United Kingdom of Great Britain and Ireland and as member of the Irish Parliamentary Party represented County Tipperary in 1885, and South Tipperary from 1885 to 1892, and North Kildare from 1905 to 1918. He was also member of the English Bar.

He was called to the English Bar in 1893 and after his final parliamentary defeat, aged nearly 70, became a King's Counsel (KC) in 1919. 'Six foot six of treason felony' he was commonly known as "Long John" because of his great height – he measured at least 6 ft 6in in height.

He was the son of William O'Connor and Julia Corbet, both fluent Irish speakers, and was educated by the Christian Brothers at Cork. Other details of his early life given in the official obituary in The Times were disputed by the historian Denis Gwynn, apparently without resolution. Thus it is not clear whether he was born in Mallow or in Blarney Lane in Cork city. Although he certainly started his working life in boyhood as some sort of traveller, it is not clear whether he was a van-boy for a local firm of wine merchants, John Daly & Co. of North Main Street, Cork, or a commercial traveller for Sir John Arnott's drapery establishment. He certainly joined the Fenian movement, and The Times stated that he used his travels in rural Co. Cork to promote the organisation.

O'Connor's role in the 1867 Fenian Rising is disputed, but he certainly maintained the confidence of the Fenian leadership afterwards. According to Gwynn, he was imprisoned at least five times as a result of his republican activities, and also went to the US as an Irish Fenian delegate in 1874.

A political turning-point came when the constitutional Home Rule League leader Charles Stewart Parnell came on a visit to Cork. O'Connor was credited with a leading part in a plot laid by Fenians to kidnap Parnell when his train stopped at Blarney station for ticket collecting. A strong party of Fenians, armed with revolvers, gathered on the platform at Blarney. However, suspicions were aroused and the train went by without stopping. When he reached Cork, Parnell had a meeting with leading Fenians, and secured the active support of some and neutrality of the rest.

In January 1885, Parnell chose O'Connor as his nominee for a parliamentary by-election for County Tipperary, and secured his selection at the Party convention over a strongly supported local candidate. O'Connor was returned unopposed. At the December 1885 general election, O'Connor stood for the new South Tipperary seat, defeating a Conservative by a margin of almost 30 to 1. He was subsequently returned unopposed at the election of 1886.

When the Irish Parliamentary Party split over Parnell's leadership in December 1890, O'Connor was one of Parnell's strongest supporters. In the week-long debate in Committee Room 15 of the House of Commons, O'Connor played a prominent role, particularly on the last day when he moved a resolution critical of Gladstone's continued insistence on Parnell's removal from the leadership.

At the subsequent general election in 1892, O'Connor stood as a for the Parnellite Irish National League but lost his seat to candidate for the Anti-Parnellite Irish National Federation by a margin of more than 3 to 1. At the same election, he also fought Kilkenny City, losing to the Anti-Parnellite candidate by the much narrower margin of 45 to 55 per cent. He remained out of the House of Commons for 13 years. During this time he trained as a barrister at the Middle Temple in London, and was called to the English Bar in 1893. He served as a member of the Royal Commission for the British Section of the Chicago Exhibition, 1893, and a member of the Council of the Royal Society of Arts, and was later chairman of the New Central Omnibus Co. and a Director of the London Central Motor Omnibus Co.

In February 1905, he was returned unopposed for North Kildare, which had become vacant on the death of his fellow Parnellite Edmund Leamy. Thereafter he was returned unopposed until the 1918 general election, when he was defeated by the Sinn Féin candidate Domhnall Ua Buachalla (later the last Governor-General of the Irish Free State) by more than 2 to 1.

He was a Prior of the Johnson Club, and in 1911 read a paper on 'Dr Johnson and Ireland'. Among O'Connor's achievements as an Irish Nationalist MP was obtaining an annual grant for the teaching of Irish in schools. Before the start of the First World War, when the leader of the Irish Parliamentary Party, John Redmond, was having difficulty in establishing military credibility for the Irish Volunteers, O'Connor went with Tom Kettle to Belgium, at Redmond's request, and purchased several thousand rifles for the use of the Volunteers.

O'Connor was a popular figure in the House of Commons and had a very courtly manner. The Times said that he had close friendships with Lord Loreburn, anti-imperialist Liberal Lord Chancellor, and with Sir John Brunner, although it does not indicate whether the latter was the first baronet or the second baronet. Both baronets were Liberal MPs during O'Connor's time in Parliament. According to The Times, O'Connor was unmarried. Maume (1999), however, citing manuscripts in the Redmond papers in the National Library of Ireland, says that at the time of his first election at North Kildare he had an estranged wife who was suing him for maintenance and whom he intended to divorce.

== Sources ==
- Dod's Parliamentary Companion, 1912, London, Whittaker & Co.
- Stephen Gwynn (1919), John Redmond's Last Years, London, Edward Arnold
- Patrick Maume, The Long Gestation: Irish Nationalist Life 1891–1918, Dublin, Gill & MacMillan, 1999
- The Times, 1 December 1885, 8 January 1912, 29 October 2 and 7 November 1928, 19 February 1930
- The Times The Parnellite Split: or, The Disruption of the Irish Parliamentary Party, from The Times, with an Introduction, London. 1891
- Brian M. Walker (ed.), Parliamentary Election Results in Ireland, 1801–1922, Dublin, Royal Irish Academy, 1978
- Who Was Who 1916–1928

Parliament of the United Kingdom
Preceded by Patrick James Smyth; Thomas Mayne	Member of Parliament for County Tipperary; January 1885 – November 1885; With: Thomas Mayne	Constituency divided
New constituency	Member of Parliament for South Tipperary; 1885 – 1892	Succeeded by Francis Mandeville
Preceded by Edmund Leamy	Member of Parliament for North Kildare; 1905 – 1918	Succeeded by Domhnall Ua Buachalla
