= P. J. Moloney =

Irish politician (1869–1947)

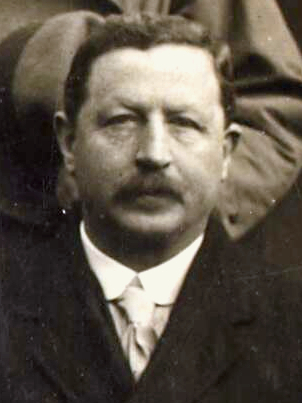
- Moloney in 1919

Teachta Dála
- In office May 1921 – August 1923
- Constituency: Tipperary Mid, North and South
- In office December 1918 – May 1921
- Constituency: Tipperary South

Personal details
- Born: Patrick James Moloney; 20 March 1869 County Tipperary, Ireland
- Died: 4 September 1947 (aged 78) County Tipperary, Ireland
- Party: Sinn Féin

Patrick James Moloney (20 March 1869 – 4 September 1947) was an Irish Sinn Féin politician. Prior to entering politics he was a chemist.

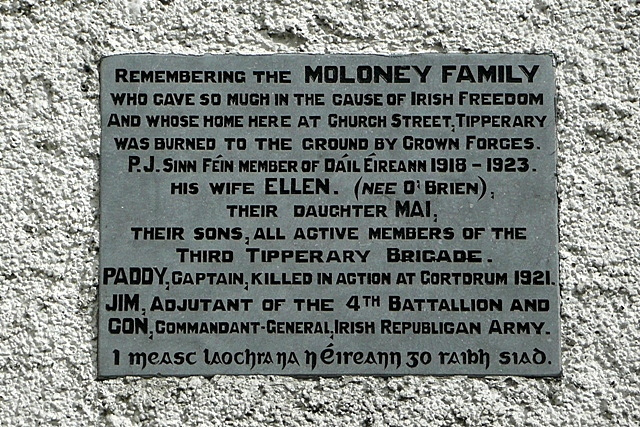
Plaque in Church street, Tipperary, commemorating the contribution of the Moloney family to the struggle for independence.

Moloney was actively involved in the Republican movement in Tipperary. He was arrested and jailed in the mass arrests after the 1916 Easter Rising. The meeting to elect brigade officers for the 3rd Tipperary Brigade was held in his house in Church street, Tipperary. The house was burnt down during the war by British forces. His three sons were active members of the brigade. One of his sons, Con became Adjutant General of the anti-Treaty IRA during the Civil War another of his sons, Patrick, was killed during the War of Independence.

British Army intelligence file for Patrick J. Moloney

He was elected as a Sinn Féin MP for the Tipperary South constituency at the 1918 general election. In January 1919, Sinn Féin MPs refused to recognise the Parliament of the United Kingdom and instead assembled at the Mansion House in Dublin as a revolutionary parliament called Dáil Éireann. He was elected unopposed as a Sinn Féin Teachta Dála (TD) for the Tipperary Mid, North and South constituency at the 1921 elections.

He opposed the Anglo-Irish Treaty and voted against it. He was re-elected for the same constituency at the 1922 general election, this time as an anti-Treaty Sinn Féin TD, but he did not take his seat in the Dáil. He did not contest the 1923 general election.

A great-grandson is the Irish historian Eunan O'Halpin.

Parliament of the United Kingdom
Preceded by John Cullinan	Member of Parliament for Tipperary South; 1918–1922	Constituency abolished
Oireachtas
New constituency	Teachta Dála for Tipperary South; 1918–1921	Constituency abolished

Dáil	Election	Deputy (Party)	Deputy (Party)	Deputy (Party)	Deputy (Party)
2nd	1921	Patrick O'Byrne (SF)	Séamus Burke (SF)	Joseph MacDonagh (SF)	P. J. Moloney (SF)
3rd	1922	Daniel Morrissey (Lab)	Séamus Burke (PT-SF)	Joseph MacDonagh (AT-SF)	P. J. Moloney (AT-SF)
4th	1923	Constituency abolished. See Tipperary			
