= 1905 North Kildare by-election =

UK Parliamentary by-election

The 1905 North Kildare by-election was a parliamentary by-election held for the United Kingdom House of Commons constituency of North Kildare on 14 February 1905. The vacancy arose because of the death of the sitting member, Edmund Leamy of the Irish Parliamentary Party. Only one candidate was nominated, John O'Connor representing the Irish Parliamentary Party, who was elected unopposed.

== Result ==
1905 North Kildare by-election
Party	Candidate	Votes	%	±%
Irish Parliamentary	John O'Connor	Unopposed	N/A	N/A
Irish Parliamentary hold				
