= Charles John Engledow =

British military officer and an Irish nationalist politician

Charles John Engledow (30 September 1860 – 18 December 1932) was a British military officer and an Irish nationalist politician and Member of Parliament (MP) in the House of Commons of the United Kingdom for the North Kildare, where he sat as an anti-Parnellite from 1895 to 1900.

He was the son of Rev W. H. Engledow, LL. D., and Clara Boyd, daughter of John Boyd, JP.

Educated at the University of Cambridge, for many years he was aide-de-camp to the Governor of Grenada and subsequently to the Governor-in-Chief of the Windward Islands.

In the 1880s, he moved to County Carlow, Ireland, where he leased Burton Hall, owned by Sir John Pope Hennessy. When that lease expired, he took up residence in Rostellan, County Cork.

In 1885, he was appointed a justice of the peace in County Carlow, Ireland. He subsequently became an ex-officio member of Carlow Board of Guardians, serving as chairman for a time. He was also involved in Athy Board of Guardians.

In 1893, he was appointed High Sheriff of Carlow.

In 1885, he contested the 1895 general election for North Kildare seat as an anti-Parnellite, taking 53.2 percent of the vote.

Defeated in 1900 general election as a Healyite Nationalist, his political demise was blamed on his voting for a gratuity to Lord Kitchener, whom Irish nationalists condemned as the "butcher of Omdurman”.

Engledow subsequently moved to Cork, where he was also a justice of the peace, a member of Cork County Council and Midleton Rural District Council.

He died on 18 December 1932 at his residence at Glenmergue, Glanmire, Cork.

Parliament of the United Kingdom
Preceded by Patrick Kennedy	Member of Parliament for North Kildare; 1895 – 1900	Succeeded by Edmund Leamy
