= Count Joseph Alexander Hübner =

Austrian diplomat (1811–1892)

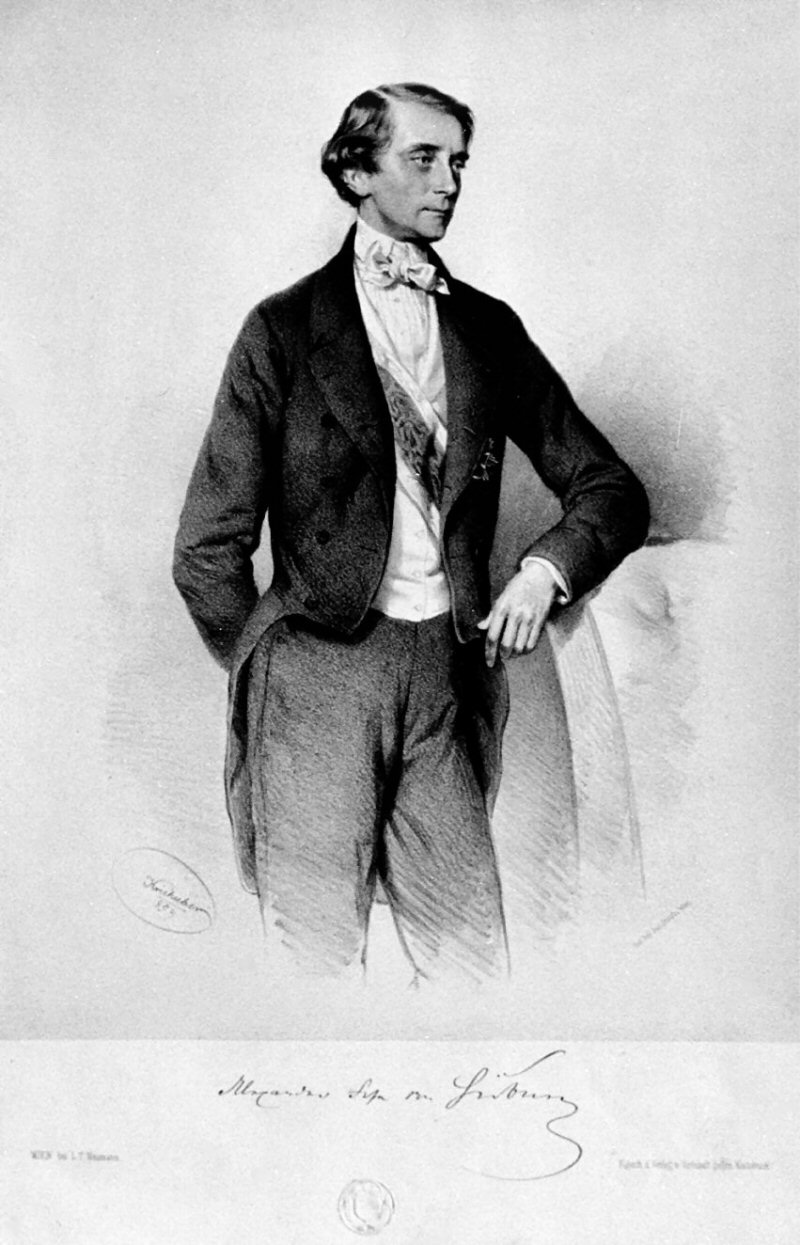
Alexander Graf Hübner, 1859

Joseph Alexander, count Hübner (26 November 1811 – 30 July 1892) was an Austrian diplomat.

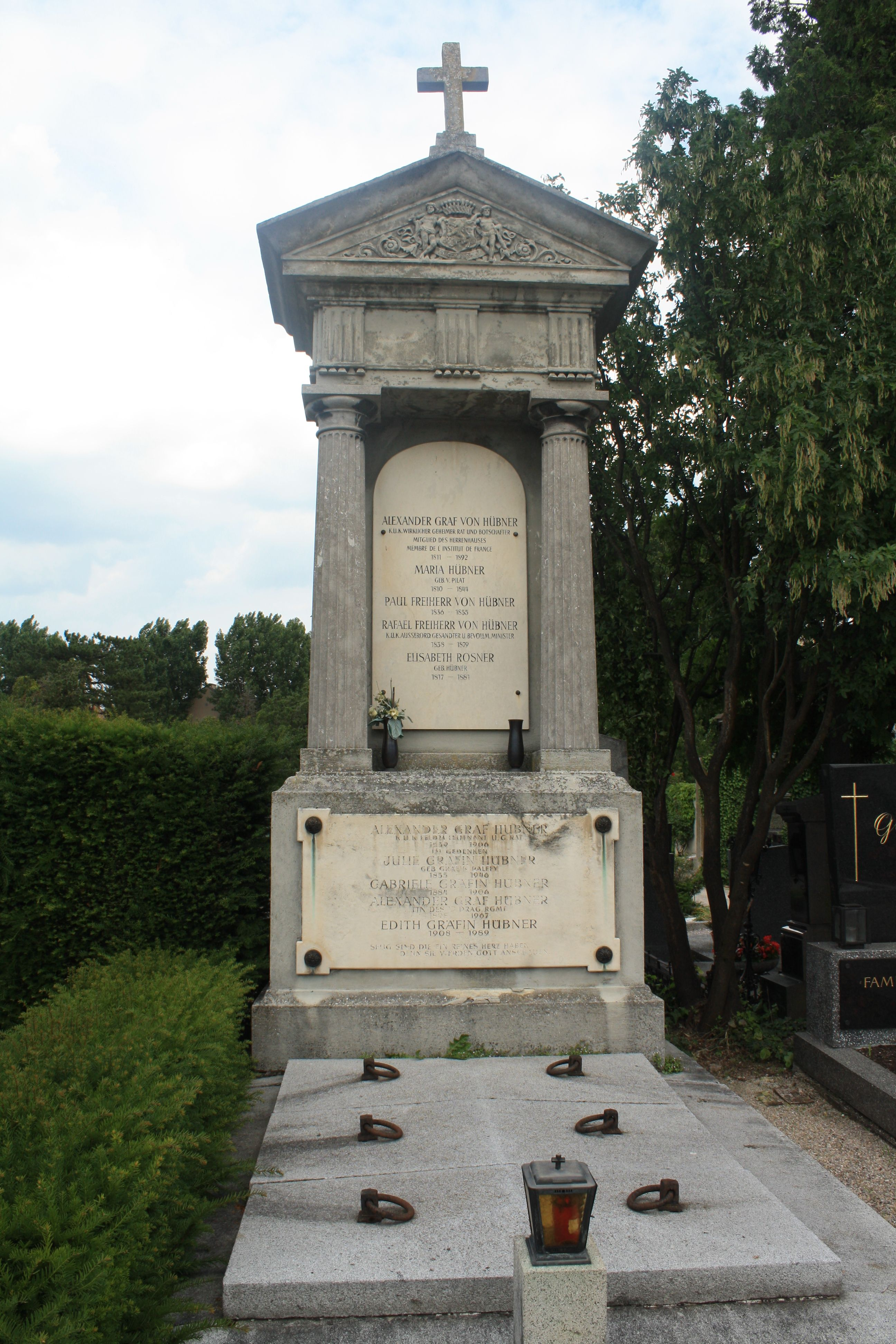
Hübner's grave in Maria Enzersdorf

== Early life ==
Hübner was born as Josef Hafenbredl in Vienna, Austria 26 November 1811. He was the illegitimate son of Elizabeth Hafenbredl and had the same surname. A number of sources state that his father was chancellor Prince Metternich. He was raised in the family of his uncle, wholesaler Josef Rohrweck. He studied law and philosophy at the University of Vienna, in the meantime he entered the civil service in 1833, in 1835 he obtained a doctorate in philosophy. He was sent by Metternich to Italy on a secret mission as early as 1830, he received permission in 1833 to call himself Alexander Hübner.

== Career ==
He began his public career in 1833 under Metternich, whose confidence he soon gained, and who sent him in 1837 as attaché to Paris. In 1841 he became secretary of embassy at Lisbon, and in 1844 Austrian consul-general at Leipzig. In 1848 he was sent to Milan to conduct the diplomatic correspondence of Archduke Rainer, viceroy of Lombardy. On the outbreak of the revolution he was seized as a hostage, and remained a prisoner for some months. Returning to Austria, he was entrusted with the compilation of the documents and proclamations relating to the abdication of the Emperor Ferdinand and the accession of Francis Joseph.

His journal, an invaluable clue to the complicated intrigues of this period, was published in 1891 in French and German, under the title of Une Année de ma vie, 1848–1849. In March 1849 he was sent on a special mission to Paris, and later in the same year was appointed ambassador to France. His influence was in large measure due to the friendly attitude of Austria to the Allies in the Crimean War, at the close of which he represented Austria at the Congress of Paris (1856). He allowed himself, however, to be taken by surprise by Napoleon's intervention on behalf of Italian unity, of which the first public intimation was given by the French emperor's cold reception of Hübner on New Year's Day, 1859, with the famous words, "I regret that our relations with your Government are not so good as they have hitherto been."

Hübner did not return to Paris after the war, and after holding the ministry of police in the Gołuchowski cabinet from August to October 1859, lived in retirement till 1865, when he became ambassador to the Holy See.

Quitting this post in 1867, he undertook extensive travels, his descriptions of which appeared as Promenade au tour du monde, 1871 (1873; English translation by Lady Herbert, 1874) and Through the British Empire (1886). Written in a bright and entertaining style, and characterized by shrewd observation, they achieved considerable popularity in their time. A more serious effort was his Sixte-Quint (1870, translated into English by HEH Jerningham under the title of The Life and Times of Sixtus the Fifth, 1872), an original contribution to the history of the period, based on unpublished documents at the Vatican, Simancas and Venice.

In 1879 he was made a life-member of the Austrian Upper House, where he sat as a Clerical and Conservative. He had received the rank of Freiherr (Baron) in 1854, and in 1888 was raised to the higher rank of Graf (Count). He died in Vienna on 30 July 1892.

== Political ideals ==
Though himself of middle-class origin, Hübner was a profound admirer of the old aristocratic regime, and found his political ideals in his former chiefs, Metternich and Schwarzenberg. As the last survivor of the Metternich school, he became towards the close of his life more and more out of touch with the trend of modern politics, but remained a conspicuous figure in the Upper House and at the annual delegations. That he possessed the breadth of mind to appreciate the working of a system at total variance with his own school of thought was shown by his grasp of British colonial questions. It is interesting, in view of subsequent events, to note his emphatic belief in the loyalty of the British colonies—a belief not shared at that time by many statesmen with far greater experience of democratic institutions.

== Other information ==
Ernest Mason Satow met Hübner in Japan when he visited from July to October 1871 during his world tour. Later he made Hübner's career the subject of his Rede Lecture at Cambridge University in 1908, being a topic unconnected with his own career so as to avoid censure by the British Foreign Office. See Sir Ernest Satow, An Austrian Diplomatist in the Fifties (Cambridge, 1908). (See here for reading on YouTube.) Hübner was the grandfather (through his daughter Eleanor) of Irish politician Count Patrick O'Byrne.

== Family ==
Hübner married Marie de Pilat (31 December 1810 – 6 July 1844) and they had three children:

- Countess Mélanie Elisabeth Marie Josepha (10 December 1834 – 19 February 1908), married Count Léon Nau de Maupassant, with whom she had a son.
- Countess Elisabeth Marie Franzisca (29 March 1837 – 1914), married Marquis Jacques de Marliave, with whom she had a son.
- Count Alexander Karl Joseph (14 December 1839 – 2 December 1906), married Countess Julie Jacqueline Erdödi Palffy, with whom he had two children.
- Countess Eleonore Alfonsine Hermine (13 December 1840 – 1925), married the Count John O'Byrne, with whom she had eight children.

== Partial Anthology ==
- von Hübner, Joseph Alexander Graf (1886). Through the British Empire, Volume 1. John Murray and Co., Abermarle Street, London.
- von Hübner, Joseph Alexander Graf (1886). Through the British Empire, Volume 2. John Murray and Co., Abermarle Street, London.
- von Hübner, Joseph Alexander Graf (1872). The life and times of Sixtus the Fifth - Volume 2. Longman Greens and Co., London; translated by Hubert EH Jerningham. ISBN 9780837082622.
- von Hübner, Joseph Alexander Graf (1874). A Ramble Round the World, 1871: Japan. Macmillan and Co, London; translated by Baroness Mary Elizabeth Herbert.
- von Hübner, Joseph Alexander Graf (1898). Milano il 1848: nelle memorie del diplomatico austriaco Joseph Alexander Graf von Hübner. Antonio Vallardi ed., Milan; Translated to Italian by Alfredo Comandini.
