= John Cullinan =

Irish politician

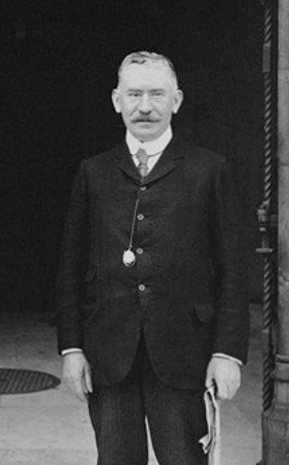
John Cullinan in 1908

John Cullinan (1858? – 17 December 1920) was an Irish Nationalist Member of the Parliament of the United Kingdom for Tipperary South, 1900–18.

John Cullinan (also spelt Cullinane) was a journalist. He was born at Bansha, son of Charles Cullinan, merchant and farmer, and Catherine, daughter of R. W. Walsh of Tourin, Co. Waterford and educated at St. Patrick's College, Thurles, Lay College. From his early manhood, he became a prominent figure in the nationalist movement in Tipperary, and played a leading part in the Land League and Plan of Campaign movements. These involvements led to him serving five terms of imprisonment, in which he was sentenced to four terms varying from one month to twelve months, and on another occasion was jailed as a 'suspect'. He was one of those indicted with John Dillon and William O'Brien in connection with the non-payment of rent campaign on the Smith-Barry estate in 1889–90. He narrowly escaped death in Tullamore jail in 1891 from an attack of fever. For many years he was Chairman of the Tipperary Board of Poor Law Guardians. He was also a member of South Tipperary County Council from its establishment in 1899, and of a District Council, and a noted player of hurling and Gaelic football and also refereed the first ever All-Ireland Football Championship final on 29 April 1888. In 1913 he married Rita, daughter of Thomas O'Meara of Cahir.

He was selected as Nationalist parliamentary candidate for South Tipperary for the general election of 1900 at a convention at Cahir on 26 September 1900, and subsequently was elected unopposed. He continued to hold the seat unopposed through successive general elections until December 1918, when he was defeated by the Sinn Féin candidate Patrick James Moloney by 8,744 votes to 2,701.

He died at a nursing home in Dublin on Friday 17 December 1920, and was buried in Tipperary.

== Notes ==
Parliament of the United Kingdom
Preceded by Francis Mandeville	Member of Parliament for South Tipperary; 1900 – 1918	Succeeded by P. J. Moloney
