= North Kildare (UK Parliament constituency) =

Former UK Parliament constituency in Ireland

- Former county constituency for the House of Commons

1885–1922
- Seats: 1
- Created from: County Kildare
- Replaced by: Kildare–Wicklow

North Kildare was a UK Parliament constituency in Ireland, returning one Member of Parliament from 1885 to 1922.

Prior to the 1885 United Kingdom general election the area was part of the County Kildare constituency. From 1922, on the establishment of the Irish Free State, it was not represented in the UK Parliament.

== Boundaries ==
This constituency comprised the northern part of County Kildare.

1885–1922: The baronies of Carbury, Clane, Connell, Ikeathy and Oughterany, North Naas, North Salt and South Salt, and that part of the barony of South Naas contained within the parishes of Kill, Killashee and Tipperkevin.

== Members of Parliament ==
| Election | Member | Party | Note |
|---|---|---|---|
| 1885, November 28 | James Laurence Carew | Irish Parliamentary | Party split |
| 1890, December ^{1} | James Laurence Carew | Irish National League | |
| 1892, July 9 | Patrick Kennedy | Irish National Federation | |
| 1895, July 20 | Charles John Engledow | Irish National Federation | |
| 1900, October 10 | Edmund Leamy | Irish Parliamentary | Died 10 December 1904 |
| 1905, February 14 | John O'Connor | Irish Parliamentary | |
| 1918, December 14 ^{2} | Domhnall Ua Buachalla | Sinn Féin | Did not take his seat at Westminster |
| 1922, October 26 | UK constituency abolished | | |

Notes:-

- ^{1} Not an election, but the date of a party change. The Irish Parliamentary Party had been created in 1882, on the initiative of Charles Stewart Parnell's Irish National League. Both the IPP and the INL split into Parnellite and Anti-Parnellite factions, in December 1890. The Parnellites remained members of the Irish National League after the split and the Anti-Parnellites organised the Irish National Federation in March 1891. The two organisations and the United Irish League merged in 1900, to re-create the Irish Parliamentary Party.
- ^{2} Date of polling day. The result was declared on 28 December 1918, to allow time for votes cast by members of the armed forces to be included in the count.

== Elections ==
=== Elections in the 1880s ===
1885 general election: North Kildare
| Party | Candidate | Votes | % | ±% |
|---|---|---|---|---|
| Irish Parliamentary | James Laurence Carew | 3,168 | 87.2 | |
| Irish Conservative | John Fock | 467 | 12.8 | |
| Majority | | 2,701 | 74.4 | |
| Turnout | | 3,635 | 71.2 | |
| Registered electors | | 5,108 | | |
| Irish Parliamentary win (new seat) | | | | |

1886 general election: North Kildare
| Party | Candidate | Votes | % | ±% |
|---|---|---|---|---|
| Irish Parliamentary | James Laurence Carew | Unopposed | | |
| Irish Parliamentary hold | | | | |

=== Elections in the 1890s ===
1892 general election: North Kildare
| Party | Candidate | Votes | % | ±% |
|---|---|---|---|---|
| Irish National Federation | Patrick Kennedy | 2,153 | 55.8 | N/A |
| Irish National League | James Laurence Carew | 1,707 | 44.2 | N/A |
| Majority | | 446 | 11.6 | N/A |
| Turnout | | 3,860 | 65.4 | N/A |
| Registered electors | | 5,901 | | |
| Irish National Federation gain from Irish Parliamentary | | Swing | N/A | |

1895 general election: North Kildare
| Party | Candidate | Votes | % | ±% |
|---|---|---|---|---|
| Irish National Federation | Charles John Engledow | 1,944 | 53.2 | −2.6 |
| Irish National League | James Laurence Carew | 1,712 | 46.8 | +2.6 |
| Majority | | 232 | 6.4 | −5.2 |
| Turnout | | 3,656 | 73.0 | +7.6 |
| Registered electors | | 5,007 | | |
| Irish National Federation hold | | Swing | −2.6 | |

=== Elections in the 1900s ===
1900 general election: North Kildare
| Party | Candidate | Votes | % | ±% |
|---|---|---|---|---|
| Irish Parliamentary | Edmund Leamy | 1,461 | 54.3 | N/A |
| Healyite Nationalist | Charles John Engledow | 1,229 | 45.7 | −7.5 |
| Majority | | 232 | 8.6 | +2.2 |
| Turnout | | 2,690 | 46.0 | −27.0 |
| Registered electors | | 5,845 | | |
| Irish Parliamentary hold | | Swing | | |

By-election, 1905: North Kildare
| Party | Candidate | Votes | % | ±% |
|---|---|---|---|---|
| Irish Parliamentary | John O'Connor | Unopposed | | |
| Irish Parliamentary hold | | | | |

1906 general election: North Kildare
| Party | Candidate | Votes | % | ±% |
|---|---|---|---|---|
| Irish Parliamentary | John O'Connor | Unopposed | | |
| Irish Parliamentary hold | | | | |

=== Elections in the 1910s ===
January 1910 general election: North Kildare
| Party | Candidate | Votes | % | ±% |
|---|---|---|---|---|
| Irish Parliamentary | John O'Connor | Unopposed | | |
| Irish Parliamentary hold | | | | |

December 1910 general election: North Kildare
| Party | Candidate | Votes | % | ±% |
|---|---|---|---|---|
| Irish Parliamentary | John O'Connor | Unopposed | | |
| Irish Parliamentary hold | | | | |

1918 general election: North Kildare
| Party | Candidate | Votes | % | ±% |
|---|---|---|---|---|
| Sinn Féin | Domhnall Ua Buachalla | 5,979 | 68.7 | New |
| Irish Parliamentary | John O'Connor | 2,722 | 31.3 | N/A |
| Majority | | 3,257 | 37.4 | N/A |
| Turnout | | 8,701 | 65.5 | N/A |
| Registered electors | | 13,274 | | |
| Sinn Féin gain from Irish Parliamentary | | Swing | N/A | |
