= South Tipperary (UK Parliament constituency) =

Former parliamentary constituency in the United Kingdom

- Former county constituency for the House of Commons

1885–1922
- Seats: 1
- Created from: Clonmel and County Tipperary
- Replaced by: Tipperary Mid, North and South

South Tipperary was a UK parliament constituency in Ireland, returning one Member of Parliament from 1885 to 1922.

Prior to 1885 the area was part of the County Tipperary constituency. From 1922, on the establishment of the Irish Free State, it was not represented in the UK Parliament.

== Boundaries ==
This constituency comprised the southern part of County Tipperary. The seat was defined under the Redistribution of Seats Act 1885 as comprising the baronies of Clanwilliam, and Iffa and Offa West. The seat was unchanged under the Redistribution of Seats (Ireland) Act 1918.

== Members of Parliament ==
Year	Member	Party
1885	John O'Connor	Irish Parliamentary Party
1892	Francis Mandeville	Irish National Federation
1900	John Cullinan	Irish Parliamentary Party
1918	P. J. Moloney	Sinn Féin

== Elections ==
=== Elections in the 1880s ===
1885 general election: South Tipperary
Party	Candidate	Votes	%	±%
Irish Parliamentary	John O'Connor	3,572	96.7	
Irish Conservative	Christopher Barton	122	3.3	
Majority		3,450	93.4	
Turnout		3,694	63.2	
Registered electors		5,841		
Irish Parliamentary win (new seat)				

1886 general election: South Tipperary
Party	Candidate	Votes	%	±%
Irish Parliamentary	John O'Connor	Unopposed		
Registered electors		5,841		
Irish Parliamentary hold				

=== Elections in the 1890s ===
1892 general election: South Tipperary
Party	Candidate	Votes	%	±%
Irish National Federation	Francis Mandeville	2,571	76.9	N/A
Irish National League	John O'Connor	773	23.1	N/A
Majority		1,798	53.8	N/A
Turnout		3,344	56.1	N/A
Registered electors		5,964		
Irish National Federation gain from Irish Parliamentary		Swing	N/A	

1895 general election: South Tipperary
Party	Candidate	Votes	%	±%
Irish National Federation	Francis Mandeville	1,723	58.5	−18.4
Irish National League	Arthur John Moore	1,222	41.5	+18.4
Majority		501	17.0	−36.8
Turnout		2,945	52.2	−3.9
Registered electors		5,644		
Irish National Federation hold		Swing	−18.4	

=== Elections in the 1900s ===
1900 general election: South Tipperary
Party	Candidate	Votes	%	±%
Irish Parliamentary	John Cullinan	Unopposed		
Registered electors		5,695		
Irish Parliamentary hold				

1906 general election: South Tipperary
Party	Candidate	Votes	%	±%
Irish Parliamentary	John Cullinan	Unopposed		
Registered electors		5,695		
Irish Parliamentary hold				

=== Elections in the 1910s ===
January 1910 general election: South Tipperary
Party	Candidate	Votes	%	±%
Irish Parliamentary	John Cullinan	Unopposed		
Registered electors		4,917		
Irish Parliamentary hold				

December 1910 general election: South Tipperary
Party	Candidate	Votes	%	±%
Irish Parliamentary	John Cullinan	Unopposed		
Registered electors		4,917		
Irish Parliamentary hold				

1918 general election: South Tipperary
Party	Candidate	Votes	%	±%
Sinn Féin	P. J. Moloney	8,744	76.4	New
Irish Parliamentary	John Cullinan	2,701	23.6	N/A
Majority		6,043	52.8	N/A
Turnout		11,445	77.8	N/A
Registered electors		14,716		
Sinn Féin gain from Irish Parliamentary		Swing	N/A	

== Sources ==
- Leigh Rayment's Historical List of MPs – Constituencies beginning with "T" (part 2)
- The Parliaments of England by Henry Stooks Smith (1st edition published in three volumes 1844–50), 2nd edition edited (in one volume) by F.W.S. Craig (Political Reference Publications 1973)
- Walker, Brian M., ed. (1978). Parliamentary Election Results in Ireland, 1801–1922. Royal Irish Academy.
