= List of MPs elected in the 1906 United Kingdom general election =

1906–Jan 1910 Parliament of the United Kingdom
←	1900–1906 Parliament	Jan–Dec 1910 Parliament	→
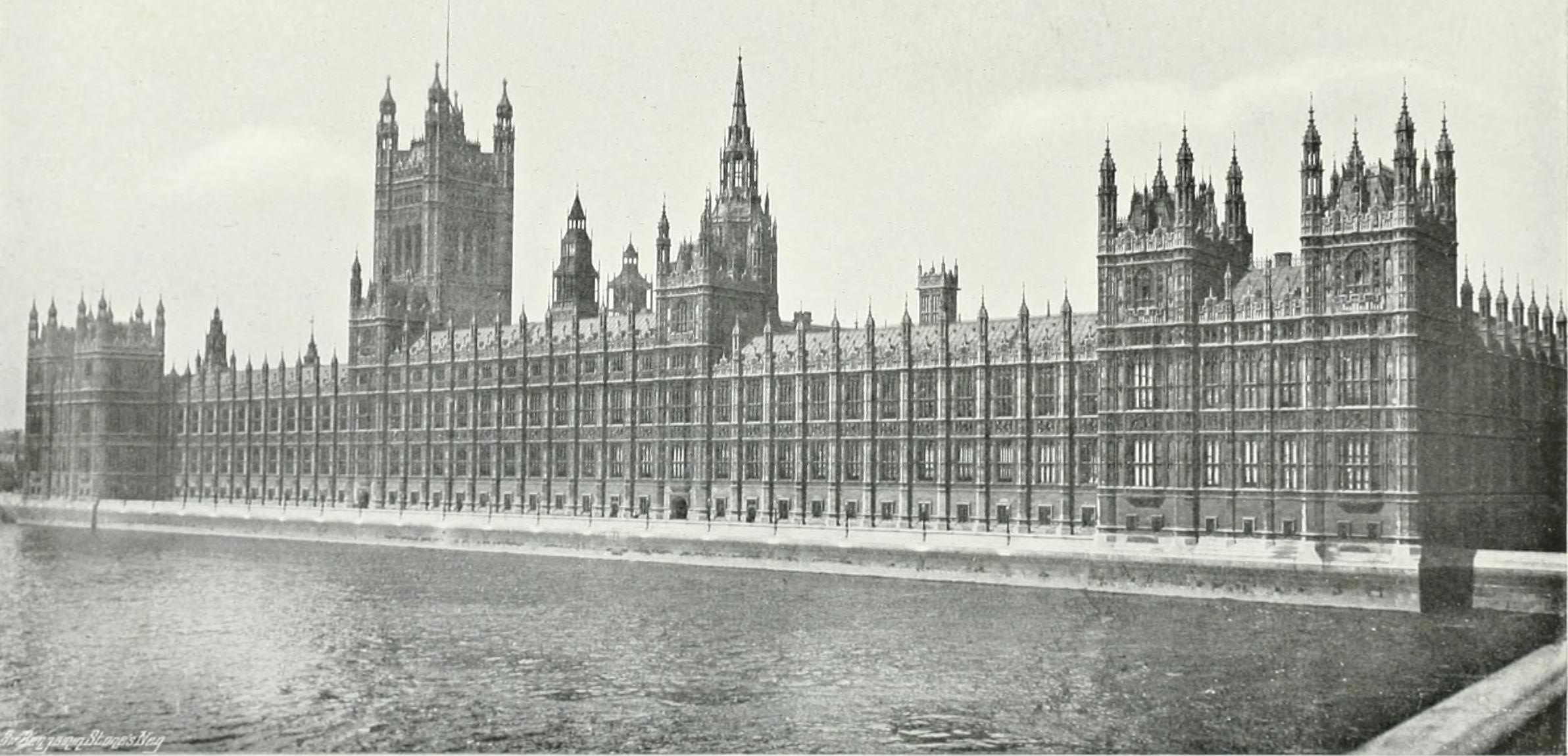
- The Palace of Westminster in 1906

Overview
- Legislative body: Parliament of the United Kingdom
- Meeting place: Palace of Westminster
- Term: 8 February 1906 – 15 January 1910
- Election: 1906 United Kingdom general election
- Government: Campbell-Bannerman ministry (until 1908); First Asquith ministry (1908–1910)

House of Commons
- Members: 670
- Speaker: James Lowther
- Leader: Henry Campbell-Bannerman (until 1908); H. H. Asquith (from 1908)
- Prime Minister: Henry Campbell-Bannerman (until 1908); H. H. Asquith (from 1908)
- Leader of the Opposition: Arthur Balfour
- Third-party leader: John Redmond

House of Lords
- Lord Chancellor: Robert Reid, 1st Earl Loreburn
- Leader: George Robinson, 1st Marquess of Ripon (until 1908); Robert Crewe-Milnes, 1st Marquess of Crewe (from 1908)
- Leader of the Opposition: The Marquess Petty-Fitzmaurice of Lansdowne

Crown-in-Parliament Edward VII

Sessions
- 1st: 13 February 1906 – 21 December 1906
- 2nd: 12 February 1907 – 28 August 1907
- 3rd: 29 January 1908 – 21 December 1908
- 4th: 16 February 1909 – 3 December 1909

The party composition of the Commons following the election.

This is a list of members of Parliament (MPs) elected at the 1906 general election, held over several days from 12 January to 8 February 1906.

== MPs ==
Constituency	MP (Government Ministers in bold)	Party (gains in bold)
Aberdeen North	Pirie, Duncan	Liberal
Aberdeen South	**Bryce, Rt Hon. James**	Liberal
Aberdeenshire East	Annand, James	**Liberal**
Aberdeenshire West	Henderson, John	Liberal
Abingdon	Strauss, Edward	**Liberal**
Accrington	Leese, Joseph	Liberal
Altrincham	Crossley, William	**Liberal**
Andover	Faber, Walter	Conservative
Anglesey	Griffith, Ellis	Liberal
Antrim East	McCalmont, James	Irish Unionist
Antrim Mid	O'Neill, Hon. Robert	Irish Unionist
Antrim North	Glendinning, Robert	Russelite> Ind. Liberal
Antrim South	Craig, Charles	Irish Unionist
Appleby	Jones, Leif	Liberal
Arfon	Jones, William	Liberal
Argyllshire	Ainsworth, John	Liberal
Armagh Mid	Lonsdale, John	Irish Unionist
Armagh North	Saunderson, Rt Hon. Edward	Irish Unionist
Armagh South	McKillop, William	**Irish Parliamentary Party**
Ashburton	Eve, Harry	Liberal
Ashford	Hardy, Laurence	Conservative
Ashton-under-Lyne	Scott, Alfred Henry	**Liberal**
Aston Manor	Cecil, Evelyn	Conservative
Aylesbury	Rothschild, Hon. Walter	Liberal Unionist
Ayr Burghs	Younger, George	**Conservative**
Ayrshire North	Cochrane, Hon. Thomas	Liberal Unionist
Ayrshire South	Beale, William	Liberal
Banbury	Fiennes, Hon. Eustace	**Liberal**
Banffshire	Black, Alexander William	Liberal
Barkston Ash	Lane-Fox, George	**Conservative**
Barnard Castle	Henderson, Arthur	Labour
Barnsley	Walton, Joseph	Liberal
Barnstaple	Soares, Ernest	Liberal
Barrow and Furness	Duncan, Charles	**Labour**
Basingstoke	Arthur Frederick Jeffreys	Conservative
Bassetlaw	Newnes, Frank	**Liberal**
Bath (Two members)	Maclean, Donald	**Liberal**
Bath (Two members)	Gooch, George Peabody	**Liberal**
Battersea	**Burns, Rt Hon. John**	Liberal
Bedford	Barlow, Percy	**Liberal**
Belfast, East	Wolff, Gustav Wilhelm	Irish Unionist
Belfast North	Dixon, Sir Daniel	Irish Unionist
Belfast South	Sloan, Thomas	Independent Unionist
Belfast West	Devlin, Joseph	**Irish Parliamentary Party**
Bermondsey	Cooper, George	**Liberal**
Berwick-upon-Tweed	**Grey, Rt Hon. Sir Edward**	Liberal
Berwickshire	Tennant, Harold	Liberal
Bethnal Green North East	Cornwall, Edwin	**Liberal**
Bethnal Green South West	Pickersgill, Edward	**Liberal**
Bewdley	Baldwin, Alfred	Conservative
Biggleswade	Black, Arthur	**Liberal**
Birkenhead	Vivian, Henry	**Liberal**
Birmingham Bordesley	Collings, Jesse	Liberal Unionist
Birmingham Central	Parkes, Sir Ebenezer	Liberal Unionist
Birmingham East	Stone, Sir John Benjamin	Conservative
Birmingham Edgbaston	Lowe, Francis	Conservative
Birmingham North	Middlemore, John	Liberal Unionist
Birmingham South	Morpeth, Viscount	Liberal Unionist
Birmingham West	Chamberlain, Rt Hon. Joseph	Liberal Unionist
Birr	Reddy, Michael	Irish Parliamentary Party
Bishop Auckland	Paulton, James Mellor	Liberal
Blackburn (Two members)	Hornby, Sir Harry	Conservative
Blackburn (Two members)	Snowden, Philip	**Labour**
Blackpool	Ashley, Wilfrid	Conservative
Bodmin	Agar-Robartes, Hon. Thomas	**Liberal**
Bolton (Two members)	Harwood, George	Liberal
Bolton (Two members)	Gill, Alfred Henry	**Labour**
Bootle	Sandys, Thomas	Conservative
Boston	Faber, George	**Liberal**
Bosworth	McLaren, Sir Charles	Liberal
Bow and Bromley	Brooke, Stopford	**Liberal**
Bradford Central	Scott Robertson, Sir George	**Liberal**
Bradford East	Priestley, William	**Liberal**
Bradford West	Jowett, Fred	**Labour**
Brecknockshire	Robinson, Sidney	Liberal
Brentford	Rutherford, Vickerman	**Liberal**
Bridgwater	Montgomery, Henry	**Liberal**
Brigg	Reckitt, Harold	Liberal
Brighton (Two members)	Ridsdale, Aurelian	**Liberal**
Brighton (Two members)	Villiers, Ernest	Liberal
Bristol East	Hobhouse, Charles	Liberal
Bristol North	**Birrell, Rt Hon. Augustine**	**Liberal**
Bristol South	Davies, Howell	**Liberal**
Bristol West	Gibbs, George	Conservative
Brixton	Seaverns, Joel	**Liberal**
Buckingham	Verney, Frederick	**Liberal**
Buckrose	White, Luke	Liberal
Burnley	Maddison, Fred	**Liberal**
Burton	Ratcliff, Robert	Liberal Unionist
Bury	Toulmin, George	Liberal
Bury St Edmunds	Hervey, Frederick	Conservative
Buteshire	Lamont, Norman	Liberal
Caithness-shire	Harmsworth, Leicester	Liberal
Camberwell North	Macnamara, Thomas	Liberal
Camborne	Dunn, Albert	Liberal
Cambridge	Buckmaster, Stanley	**Liberal**
Cambridge University (Two members)	Butcher, Samuel	Conservative
Cambridge University (Two members)	Rawlinson, John	Conservative
Canterbury	Henniker Heaton, John	Conservative
Cardiff	Guest, Hon. Ivor	Liberal
Cardiganshire	Vaughan-Davies, Matthew	Liberal
Carlisle	Chance, Frederick	Liberal
County Carlow	Hammond, John	Irish Parliamentary Party
Carmarthen Boroughs	Williams, W. Llewelyn	Liberal
Carmarthenshire East	Thomas, Abel	Liberal
Carmarthenshire West	Morgan, John Lloyd	Liberal
Carnarvon	**Lloyd George, Rt Hon. David**	Liberal
Cavan East	Young, Samuel	Irish Parliamentary Party
Cavan West	Kennedy, Vincent	Irish Parliamentary Party
Chatham	Jenkins, John	**Labour**
Chelmsford	Rasch, Sir Carne	Conservative
Chelsea	Horniman, Emslie	**Liberal**
Cheltenham	Sears, John	**Liberal**
Chertsey	Marnham, Francis	**Liberal**
Chester	Mond, Alfred	**Liberal**
Chester-le-Street	Taylor, John Wilkinson	**Independent Labour > Labour**
Chesterfield	Haslam, James	Liberal
Chesterton	Montagu, Hon. Edwin	**Liberal**
Chichester	Talbot, Lord Edmund	Conservative
Chippenham	Dickson-Poynder, Sir John	Liberal
Chorley	Balcarres, Lord	Conservative
Christchurch	Allen, Arthur Acland	**Liberal**
Cirencester	Essex, Walter	**Liberal**
Clackmannan and Kinrossshire	Wason, Eugene	Liberal
Clapham	Thornton, Percy	Conservative
Clare East	Redmond, Willie	Irish Parliamentary Party
Clare West	Halpin, James	Irish Parliamentary Party
Cleveland	Samuel, Herbert	Liberal
Clitheroe	Shackleton, David	Labour
Cockermouth	Lawson, Sir Wilfrid	**Liberal**
Colchester	Pearson, Sir Weetman	Liberal
Colne Valley	Kitson, Sir James	Liberal
Cork City (Two members)	O'Brien, William	Irish Parliamentary Party
Cork City (Two members)	Roche, Augustine	Irish Parliamentary Party
Cork East	Donelan, Anthony	Irish Parliamentary Party
Cork Mid	Sheehan, D. D.	Irish Parliamentary Party
Cork North	Flynn, James Christopher	Irish Parliamentary Party
Cork North East	Abraham, William	Irish Parliamentary Party
Cork South	Barry, Edward	Irish Parliamentary Party
Cork South East	Crean, Eugene	Irish Parliamentary Party
Cork West	Gilhooly, James	Irish Parliamentary Party
Coventry	Mason, A. E. W.	**Liberal**
Crewe	Tomkinson, James	Liberal
Cricklade	Massie, John	Liberal
Croydon	Arnold-Forster, Rt Hon. H. O.	Liberal Unionist
Darlington	Pease, Herbert	Liberal Unionist
Dartford	Rowlands, Jimmy	**Liberal**
Darwen	Rutherford, John	Conservative
Denbigh Boroughs	Edwards, Clement	**Liberal**
Denbighshire East	Moss, Samuel	Liberal
Denbighshire West	Roberts, Sir John	Liberal
Deptford	Bowerman, C. W.	**Labour**
Derby (Two members)	Roe, Sir Thomas	Liberal
Derby (Two members)	Bell, Richard	Liberal
Derbyshire Mid	Jacoby, Sir James Alfred	Liberal
Derbyshire North East	Bolton, Thomas	Liberal
Derbyshire South	Raphael, Herbert	**Liberal**
Derbyshire West	Cavendish, Rt Hon. Victor	Liberal Unionist
Devizes	Rogers, Francis	**Liberal**
Devonport (Two members)	Kearley, Hudson	Liberal
Devonport (Two members)	Benn, John	Liberal
Dewsbury	Runciman, Walter	Liberal
Doncaster	Nicholson, Charles	**Liberal**
Donegal East	McVeigh, Charles	Irish Parliamentary Party
Donegal North	O'Doherty, Philip	Irish Parliamentary Party
Donegal South	Swift MacNeill, J. G.	Irish Parliamentary Party
Donegal West	Law, Hugh	Irish Parliamentary Party
Dorset East	Lyell, Hon. Charles	Liberal
Dorset North	Wills, Arthur Walters	Liberal
Dorset South	Scarisbrick, Thomas	**Liberal**
Dorset West	Williams, Robert	Conservative
Dover	Wyndham, Rt Hon. George	Conservative
Down East	Craig, James	**Irish Unionist**
Down North	Corbett, Thomas Lorimer	Irish Unionist
Down South	McVeagh, Jeremiah	Irish Parliamentary Party
Down West	Liddell, Harry	Irish Unionist
Droitwich	Harmsworth, Cecil	**Liberal**
Dublin North	Clancy, J. J.	Irish Parliamentary Party
Dublin South	Long, Rt Hon. Walter	**Irish Unionist**
Dublin College Green	Nannetti, Joseph	Irish Parliamentary Party
Dublin Harbour	Harrington, Timothy	Irish Parliamentary Party
Dublin St Patrick's	Field, William	Irish Parliamentary Party
Dublin St Stephen's Green	Waldron, Laurence	Irish Parliamentary Party
Dublin University (Two members)	Carson, Rt Hon. Sir Edward	Irish Unionist
Dublin University (Two members)	Campbell, James	Irish Unionist
Dudley	Hooper, Arthur George	**Liberal**
Dulwich	Harris, Frederick Rutherfoord	Conservative
Dunbartonshire	White, J. D.	**Liberal**
Dumfries Burghs	Gulland, John	Liberal
Dumfriesshire	Molteno, Percy	**Liberal**
Dundee	Wilkie, Alexander	**Labour**
Dundee	Robertson, Edmund	Liberal
Durham	Hills, John	Liberal Unionist
Durham Mid	Wilson, John	Liberal
Durham North West	Atherley-Jones, Llewellyn	Liberal
Durham South East	Lambton, Viscount	Liberal Unionist
Ealing	Nield, Sir Herbert	Conservative
East Grinstead	Corbett, Charles	**Liberal**
Eastbourne	Beaumont, Hon. Hubert	**Liberal**
Eccles	Pollard, George	**Liberal**
Eddisbury	Stanley, Hon. Arthur	**Liberal**
Edinburgh Central	Price, Charles Edward	Liberal
Edinburgh East	McCrae, George	Liberal
Edinburgh South	Dewar, Arthur	**Liberal**
Edinburgh West	McIver, Sir Lewis	Liberal Unionist
Edinburgh and St Andrews Universities	Tuke, Sir John Batty	Conservative
Egremont	Fullerton, Hugh	**Liberal**
Eifion	Roberts, John Bryn	Liberal
Elgin Burghs	Sutherland, John	Liberal
Elgin and Nairnshires	Williamson, Archibald	**Liberal**
Elland	Trevelyan, Charles	Liberal
Enfield	Branch, James	**Liberal**
Epping	Lockwood, Rt Hon. Amelius	Conservative
Epsom	Keswick, William	Conservative
Eskdale	Howard, Hon. Geoffrey	**Liberal**
Essex South East	Whitehead, Rowland	**Liberal**
Evesham	Long, Charles Wigram	Conservative
Exeter	Kekewich, Sir George	**Liberal**
Eye	Stevenson, Francis Seymour	Liberal
Falkirk Burghs	Macdonald, John	**Liberal**
Fareham	Lee, Arthur	Conservative
Faversham	Napier, Thomas	**Liberal**
Fermanagh North	Fetherstonhaugh, Godfrey	**Irish Unionist**
Fermanagh South	Jordan, Jeremiah	Irish Parliamentary Party
Fife East	**Asquith, Rt Hon. H. H.**	Liberal
Fife West	Hope, John Deans	Liberal
Finsbury Central	Steadman, W. C.	**Liberal**
Finsbury East	Baker, Joseph Allen	Liberal
Flint Boroughs	Idris, Howell	Liberal
Flintshire	Lewis, Herbert	Liberal
Forest of Dean	Dilke, Rt Hon. Sir Charles	Liberal
Forfarshire	**Sinclair, Rt Hon. John**	Liberal
Frome	Barlow, John	Liberal
Fulham	Davies, Timothy	**Liberal**
Gainsborough	Renton, Leslie	**Liberal**
Galway Borough	Devlin, Charles Ramsay	Irish Parliamentary Party
Galway Connemara	O'Malley, William	Irish Parliamentary Party
Galway East	Roche, John	Irish Parliamentary Party
Galway North	Higgins, Thomas	Irish Parliamentary Party
Galway South	Duffy, William	Irish Parliamentary Party
Gateshead	Johnson, John	Liberal
Glamorganshire, East	Thomas, Sir Alfred	Liberal
Glamorganshire, Mid	Evans, Samuel	Liberal
Glamorganshire, South	Brace, William	**Liberal**
Glasgow Blackfriars and Hutchesontown	Barnes, George	**Labour**
Glasgow Bridgeton	Cleland, James William	**Liberal**
Glasgow Camlachie	Cross, Alexander	Liberal Unionist
Glasgow Central	Torrance, Sir Andrew Mitchell	**Liberal**
Glasgow College	Watt, Harry	**Liberal**
Glasgow St Rollox	Wood, McKinnon	**Liberal**
Glasgow Tradeston	Corbett, Archibald	Liberal Unionist
Glasgow and Aberdeen Universities	Craik, Sir Henry	Conservative
Gloucester	Rea, Russell	Liberal
Gorton	Hodge, John	**Labour**
Govan	Duncan, Robert	**Conservative**
Gower	Williams, John	**Independent Lib-Lab**
Grantham	Priestley, Arthur	Liberal
Gravesend	Parker, Sir Gilbert	Conservative
Great Grimsby	Doughty, Sir George	Liberal Unionist
Great Yarmouth	Fell, Arthur	Conservative
Greenock	Stewart, Halley	**Liberal**
Greenwich	Jackson, Richard	**Liberal**
Guildford	Cowan, Henry	**Liberal**
Hackney Central	Spicer, Albert	**Liberal**
Hackney North	Hart-Davies, Thomas	**Liberal**
Hackney South	Bottomley, Horatio	**Liberal**
Haddingtonshire	**Haldane, Rt Hon. Richard**	Liberal
Haggerston	Cremer, Sir Randal	Liberal
Halifax (Two members)	Parker, James	**Labour**
Halifax (Two members)	Whitley, J. H.	Liberal
Hallamshire	Wadsworth, John	Liberal
Hammersmith	Bull, William	Conservative
Hampstead	Fletcher, John	Conservative
Handsworth	Meysey-Thompson, Ernest	Liberal Unionist
Hanley	Edwards, Enoch	**Liberal**
Harborough	Lehmann, R. C.	Liberal
Harrow	Gibb, James	**Liberal**
Hartlepools, The	Furness, Sir Christopher	Liberal
Harwich	Lever, Arthur	**Liberal**
Hastings	du Cros, Harvey	**Conservative**
Hawick Burghs	Shaw, Thomas	Liberal
Henley	Morrell, Philip	**Liberal**
Hereford	Arkwright, John	Conservative
Hertford	Smith, Abel Henry	Conservative
Hexham	Beaumont, Wentworth	Liberal
Heywood	Holden, Edward	Liberal
High Peak	Partington, Oswald	Liberal
Hitchin	Bertram, Julius	**Liberal**
Holborn	Remnant, James	Conservative
Holderness	Wilson, Stanley	Conservative
Holmfirth	Wilson, Henry	Liberal
Honiton	Kennaway, Sir John	Conservative
Horncastle	Willoughby de Eresby, Lord	Conservative
Hornsey	Balfour, Charles	Conservative
Horsham	Edward Turnour	Conservative
Houghton-le-Spring	Cameron, Robert	Liberal
Howdenshire	Harrison-Broadley, Henry	Conservative
Hoxton	Hay, Hon. Claude	Conservative
Huddersfield	Woodhouse, Sir James	Liberal
Hull Central	King, Sir Seymour	Conservative
Hull East	Ferens, Thomas	**Liberal**
Hull West	Wilson, Charles	Liberal
Huntingdon	Whitbread, Samuel	**Liberal**
Hyde	Schwann, Duncan	**Liberal**
Hythe	Sassoon, Sir Edward	Conservative
Ilkeston	Foster, Sir Walter	Liberal
Ince	Walsh, Stephen	**Labour**
Inverness Burghs	Bryce, Annan	**Liberal**
Inverness-shire	Dewar, John	**Liberal**
Ipswich (Two members)	Goddard, Daniel Ford	Liberal
Ipswich (Two members)	Cobbold, Felix	**Liberal**
Isle of Thanet	Marks, Harry	Conservative
Isle of Wight	Baring, Godfrey	Liberal
Islington East	Radford, George	**Liberal**
Islington North	Waterlow, David	**Liberal**
Islington South	Wiles, Thomas	**Liberal**
Islington West	Lough, Thomas	Liberal
Jarrow	Palmer, Sir Charles	Liberal
Keighley	Brigg, John	Liberal
Kendal	Stewart-Smith, Dudley	**Liberal**
Kennington	Collins, Stephen	**Liberal**
Kensington North	Stanger, Henry Yorke	**Liberal**
Kensington South	Earl Percy	Conservative
Kerry East	Murphy, John	Irish Parliamentary Party
Kerry North	Flavin, Michael Joseph	Irish Parliamentary Party
Kerry South	Boland, John	Irish Parliamentary Party
Kerry West	O'Donnell, Thomas	Irish Parliamentary Party
Kidderminster	Barnard, Edmund	**Liberal**
Kildare North	O'Connor, John	Irish Parliamentary Party
Kildare South	Kilbride, Denis	Irish Parliamentary Party
Kilkenny City	O'Brien, Pat	Irish Parliamentary Party
Kilkenny North	Devlin, Joseph	Irish Parliamentary Party
Kilkenny South	O'Mara, James	Irish Parliamentary Party
Kilmarnock Burghs	Rainy, Adam Rolland	**Liberal**
Kincardineshire	Crombie, John William	Liberal
King's Lynn	Bellairs, Carlyon	**Liberal**
Kingston-upon-Thames	Cave, George	Conservative
Kingswinford	Staveley-Hill, Henry	Conservative
Kirkcaldy Burghs	Dalziel, James	Liberal
Kirkcudbrightshire	McMicking, Gilbert	**Liberal**
Knutsford	King, Alfred John	**Liberal**
Lambeth North	Myer, Horatio	**Liberal**
Lanarkshire Mid	Caldwell, James	Liberal
Lanarkshire North East	Findlay, Alexander	Liberal
Lanarkshire North West	Mitchell-Thompson, William	Conservative
Lanarkshire South	Menzies, Walter	**Liberal**
Lancaster	Helme, Norval	Liberal
Launceston	Marks, George	Liberal
Leeds Central	Armitage, Robert	**Liberal**
Leeds East	O'Grady, James	**Labour**
Leeds North	Barran, Sir Rowland	Liberal
Leeds South	Walton, John Lawson	Liberal
Leeds West	**Gladstone, Rt Hon. Herbert**	Liberal
Leek	Pearce, Robert	**Liberal**
Leicester (Two members)	Broadhurst, Henry	Liberal
Leicester (Two members)	MacDonald, Ramsay	**Labour**
Leigh	Brunner, John	Liberal
Leith Burghs	Munro-Ferguson, Ronald	Liberal
Leitrim North	McHugh, P. A. (chose to sit for Sligo North)	Irish Parliamentary Party
Leitrim South	Smyth, Thomas	Irish Parliamentary Party
Leix	Meehan, Patrick	Irish Parliamentary Party
Leominster	Lamb, Edmund	**Liberal**
Lewes	Aubrey-Fletcher, Rt Hon. Sir Henry	Conservative
Lewisham	Coates, Edward	Conservative
Lichfield	Warner, Courtenay	Liberal
Limehouse	Pearce, William	**Liberal**
Limerick City	Joyce, Michael	Irish Parliamentary Party
Limerick East	Lundon, William	Irish Parliamentary Party
Limerick West	O'Shaughnessy, Patrick	Irish Parliamentary Party
Lincoln	Roberts, Charles	**Liberal**
Linlithgowshire	Ure, Alexander	Liberal
Liverpool Abercromby	Seely, J. E. B.	**Liberal**
Liverpool Everton	Harmood-Banner, John	Conservative
Liverpool Exchange	Cherry, Richard	**Liberal**
Liverpool Kirkdale	MacIver, David	Conservative
Liverpool Scotland	O'Connor, T. P.	Irish Parliamentary Party
Liverpool East Toxteth	Taylor, Austin	Conservative ->Liberal
Liverpool West Toxteth	Houston, Robert	Conservative
Liverpool Walton	Smith, F. E.	Conservative
Liverpool West Derby	Rutherford, William	Conservative
London, City of (Two members)	Clarke, Sir Edward	Conservative
London, City of (Two members)	Gibbs, Hon. Alban	Conservative
London University	Magnus, Sir Philip	**Liberal Unionist**
Londonderry City	James Hamilton	Irish Unionist
Londonderry North	Barrie, Hugh T.	Irish Unionist
Londonderry South	Gordon, John	Liberal Unionist
Longford North	Farrell, J. P.	Irish Parliamentary Party
Longford South	Blake, Edward	Irish Parliamentary Party
North Lonsdale	Haddock, George	Conservative
Loughborough	Levy, Maurice	Liberal
Louth	Perks, Robert	Liberal
Louth North	Healy, Tim	Independent Nationalist
Louth South	Nolan, Joseph	Irish Parliamentary Party
Lowestoft	Beauchamp, Edward	**Liberal**
Ludlow	Hunt, Rowland	Liberal Unionist
Luton	Ashton, Thomas	Liberal
Macclesfield	Brocklehurst, William	**Liberal**
Maidstone	Viscount Castlereagh	**Conservative**
Maldon	Bethell, Thomas	**Liberal**
Manchester East	Horridge, Thomas Gardner	**Liberal**
Manchester North	Swann, Charles	Liberal
Manchester North East	Clynes, J. R.	**Labour**
Manchester North West	Churchill, Winston	**Liberal**
Manchester South	Haworth, Arthur	**Liberal**
Manchester South West	Kelley, George Davy	**Labour**
Mansfield	Markham, Arthur	Liberal
Marylebone East	Cecil, Robert	Conservative
Marylebone West	Scott, Sir Samuel	Conservative
Mayo East	Dillon, John	Irish Parliamentary Party
Mayo North	O'Kelly, Conor	Irish Parliamentary Party
Mayo South	O'Donnell, John	Irish Parliamentary Party
Mayo West	Ambrose, Robert	Irish Parliamentary Party
Meath North	White, Patrick	Irish Parliamentary Party
Meath South	Sheehy, David	Irish Parliamentary Party
Medway	Warde, Charles	Conservative
Melton	Walker, Henry de Rosenbach	**Liberal**
Merionethshire	Williams, Osmond	Liberal
Merthyr Tydfil (Two members)	Thomas, D. A.	Liberal
Merthyr Tydfil (Two members)	Keir Hardie	Labour
Middlesbrough	Wilson, Havelock	**Liberal**
Middleton	Adkins, Ryland	**Liberal**
Midlothian	Dalmeny, Lord	Liberal
Mile End	Straus, Bertram	**Liberal**
Monaghan North	O'Hare, Patrick	Irish Parliamentary Party
Monaghan South	McKean, John	Irish Parliamentary Party
Monmouth Boroughs	Haslam, Lewis	**Liberal**
Monmouthshire North	McKenna, Reginald	Liberal
Monmouthshire South	Herbert, Ivor	**Liberal**
Monmouthshire West	Richards, Thomas	Liberal
Montgomery Boroughs	Rees, John	**Liberal**
Montgomeryshire	Davies, David	Liberal
Montrose Burghs	**Morley, Rt Hon. John**	Liberal
Morley	Hutton, Alfred	Liberal
Morpeth	Burt, Thomas	Liberal
New Forest	Hobart, Robert	**Liberal**
Newark	Starkey, John	Conservative
Newbury	Mackarness, Frederick	**Liberal**
Newcastle-upon-Tyne (Two members)	Hudson, Walter	**Labour**
Newcastle-upon-Tyne (Two members)	Cairns, Thomas	**Liberal**
Newcastle-under-Lyme	Wedgwood, Josiah	**Liberal**
Newington West	Norton, Cecil	Liberal
Newmarket	Rose, Charles	Liberal
Newport	Kenyon-Slaney, Rt Hon. William	Conservative
Newry	Mooney, John	Irish Parliamentary Party
Newton	Seddon, James	**Labour**
Norfolk East	Price, Robert	Liberal
Norfolk Mid	Wodehouse, John	Liberal
Norfolk North	Gurdon, Sir William Brampton	Liberal
Norfolk North West	White, George	Liberal
Norfolk South	Soames, Arthur	Liberal
Norfolk South West	Winfrey, Richard	**Liberal**
Normanton	Hall, Frederick	Liberal
Northampton (Two members)	Herbert Paul	Liberal
Northampton (Two members)	Shipman, John Greenwood	Liberal
Northamptonshire East	Channing, Francis	Liberal
Northamptonshire Mid	Manfield, Harry	Liberal
Northamptonshire North	Nicholls, George	**Liberal**
Northamptonshire South	Grove, Archibald	**Liberal**
Northwich	Brunner, Sir John	Liberal
Norwich (Two members)	Tillett, Louis	Liberal
Norwich (Two members)	Roberts, George	**Labour**
Norwood	Bowles, George	Conservative
Nottingham East	Cotton, Sir Henry	**Liberal**
Nottingham South	Richardson, Arthur	**Liberal**
Nottingham West	Yoxall, James	Liberal
Nuneaton	Johnson, William	**Liberal**
Oldham (Two members)	Emmott, Alfred	Liberal
Oldham (Two members)	Bright, John Albert	**Liberal**
Orkney and Shetland	Wason, Cathcart	Liberal
Ormskirk	Stanley, Hon. Arthur	Conservative
Osgoldcross	Compton-Rickett, Joseph	Liberal
Ossory	Delany, William	Irish Parliamentary Party
Oswestry	Bridgeman, William	**Conservative**
Otley	Duncan, Hastings	Liberal
Oxford	Viscount Valentia	Conservative
Oxford University (Two members)	Talbot, John Gilbert	Conservative
Oxford University (Two members)	Anson, Sir William	Liberal Unionist
Paddington North	Chiozza Money, Leo	**Liberal**
Paddington South	Fardell, Sir George	Conservative
Paisley	McCallum, John	Liberal
Partick	Balfour, Robert	**Liberal**
Peckham	Clarke, Charles	**Liberal**
Peebles and Selkirk	Elibank, The Master of	**Liberal**
Pembroke & Haverfordwest Boroughs	Philipps, Owen	**Liberal**
Pembrokeshire	Philipps, John	Liberal
Penrith	Lowther, Rt Hon. James	Conservative (Speaker)
Penryn and Falmouth	Barker, John	Liberal
Perth	Wallace, Robert	Liberal
Perthshire Eastern	Buchanan, Thomas	Liberal
Perthshire Western	Erskine, David	**Liberal**
Peterborough	Greenwood, George	**Liberal**
Petersfield	Nicholson, William	Conservative
Plymouth (Two members)	Dobson, Thomas	**Liberal**
Plymouth (Two members)	Mallet, Charles	Liberal
Pontefract	Nussey, Thomas	Liberal
Poplar	Buxton, Rt Hon. Sydney	Liberal
Portsmouth (Two members)	Bramsdon, Thomas	**Liberal**
Portsmouth (Two members)	Baker, Sir John	**Liberal**
Preston (Two members)	Macpherson, John	**Labour**
Preston (Two members)	Cox, Harold	**Liberal**
Prestwich	Cawley, Frederick	Liberal
Pudsey	Whiteley, George	Liberal
Radcliffe cum Farnworth	Taylor, Theodore	Liberal
Radnorshire	Edwards, Frank	Liberal
Ramsey	Boulton, Alexander	**Liberal**
Reading	Isaacs, Rufus	Liberal
Reigate	Brodie, Harry	**Liberal**
Renfrewshire East	Laidlaw, Robert	**Liberal**
Renfrewshire West	Glen-Coats, Sir Thomas	**Liberal**
Rhondda	Abraham, William	Liberal
Richmond	Dyke Acland, Francis	**Liberal**
Ripon	Lynch, H. F. B.	**Liberal**
Rochdale	Harvey, Gordon	**Liberal**
Rochester	Lamb, Ernest	**Liberal**
Romford	Bethell, John	**Liberal**
Roscommon North	O'Kelly, James	Irish Parliamentary Party
Roscommon South	Hayden, John Patrick	Irish Parliamentary Party
Ross	Gardner, Alan	Liberal
Ross and Cromarty	Weir, James	Liberal
Rossendale	**Harcourt, Rt Hon. Lewis**	Liberal
Rotherham	Holland, Sir William	Liberal
Rotherhithe	Carr-Gomm, Hubert	**Liberal**
Roxburghshire	Jardine, John	**Liberal**
Rugby	Grant, Corrie	Liberal
Rushcliffe	Ellis, John	Liberal
Rutland	Finch, George	Conservative
Rye	Courthope, George	**Conservative**
Saffron Walden	Pease, Jack	Liberal
St Albans	Carlile, Hildred	**Conservative**
St Andrews Burghs	Anstruther-Gray, William	**Liberal Unionist**
St Augustine's	Akers-Douglas, Rt Hon. Aretas	Conservative
St Austell	McArthur, William	Liberal
St George, Hanover Square	Legge, Hon. Heneage	Conservative
St George, Tower Hamlets	Wedgwood Benn, William	**Liberal**
St Helens	Glover, Thomas	**Labour**
St Ives	Cory, Clifford	Liberal
St Pancras East	Lea, Hugh	Liberal
St Pancras North	Dickinson, Willoughby	**Liberal**
St Pancras South	Wilson, Philip	**Liberal**
St Pancras West	Collins, Sir William	**Liberal**
Salford North	Byles, William	**Liberal**
Salford South	Belloc, Hilaire	**Liberal**
Salford West	Agnew, George	**Liberal**
Salisbury	Tennant, Edward	**Liberal**
Scarborough	Rea, Walter	Liberal
Sevenoaks	Forster, Henry	Conservative
Sheffield Attercliffe	Langley, J. Batty	Liberal
Sheffield, Brightside	Walters, Tudor	**Liberal**
Sheffield, Central	Vincent, Sir Howard	Conservative
Sheffield, Ecclesall	Roberts, Samuel	Conservative
Sheffield, Hallam	Stuart-Wortley, Charles	Conservative
Shipley	Illingworth, Percy	**Liberal**
Shrewsbury	Hill, Sir Clement Lloyd	Conservative
Skipton	Clough, William	Liberal
Sleaford	Lupton, Arnold	**Liberal**
Sligo North	McHugh, P. A.	Irish Parliamentary Party
Sligo South	O'Dowd, John	Irish Parliamentary Party
Somerset East	Thompson, John	**Liberal**
Somerset North	Hope, William	**Liberal**
Somerset South	Strachey, Sir Edward	Liberal
South Molton	Lambert, George	Liberal
South Shields	Robson, Sir William	Liberal
Southampton (Two members)	Philipps, Ivor	**Liberal**
Southampton (Two members)	Dudley Ward, William	**Liberal**
Southport	Astbury, John	**Liberal**
Southwark West	Causton, Richard	Liberal
Sowerby	Higham, John	Liberal
Spalding	Mansfield, Horace	Liberal
Spen Valley	Whittaker, Sir Thomas	Liberal
Stafford	Shaw, Charles	Liberal
Staffordshire North West	Billson, Alfred	**Liberal**
Staffordshire, West	McLaren, Henry	**Liberal**
Stalybridge	Cheetham, John	Liberal
Stamford	Joicey-Cecil, John	Conservative
Stepney	Evans-Gordon, Sir William	Conservative
Stirling Burghs	**Campbell-Bannerman, Rt Hon. Sir Henry**	Liberal
Stirlingshire	Smeaton, Donald	**Liberal**
Stockport (Two members)	Wardle, George	**Labour**
Stockport (Two members)	Duckworth, James	Liberal
Stockton-on-Tees	Ropner, Sir Robert	Conservative
Stoke-on-Trent	Ward, John	**Liberal**
Stowmarket	Hardy, George	Liberal
Strand	Smith, Hon. Frederick	Conservative
Stratford upon Avon	Kincaid-Smith, Thomas	**Liberal**
Stretford	Nuttall, Harry	**Liberal**
Stroud	Allen, Charles	Liberal
Sudbury	Heaton-Armstrong, William	**Liberal**
Sunderland (Two members)	Stuart, James	**Liberal**
Sunderland (Two members)	Summerbell, Thomas	**Labour**
Sutherland	Morton, Alpheus	**Liberal**
Swansea Boroughs	Jones, Sir David Brynmor	Liberal
Swansea Town	Newnes, Sir George	Liberal
Tamworth	Muntz, Sir Philip	Conservative
Taunton	Boyle, Sir Edward	Conservative
Tavistock	Luttrell, Hugh	**Liberal**
Tewkesbury	Hicks Beach, Michael	Conservative
Thirsk and Malton	Viscount Helmsley	Conservative
Thornbury	Rendall, Athelstan	**Liberal**
Tipperary East	Condon, Thomas	Irish Parliamentary Party
Tipperary Mid	O'Brien, Kendal	Irish Parliamentary Party
Tipperary North	Hogan, Michael	Irish Parliamentary Party
Tipperary South	Cullinan, John	Irish Parliamentary Party
Tiverton	Walrond, Hon. William	Conservative
Torquay	Layland-Barratt, Sir Francis	Liberal
Totnes	Mildmay, Francis	Liberal Unionist
Tottenham	Alden, Percy	Liberal
Truro	Morgan, George Hay	**Liberal**
Tullamore	Haviland-Burke, Edmund	Irish Parliamentary Party
Tunbridge	Hedges, Alfred	**Liberal**
Tynemouth	Craig, Herbert	**Liberal**
Tyneside	Robertson, J.M.	**Liberal**
Tyrone East	Doogan, Patrick	Irish Parliamentary Party
Tyrone Mid	Murnaghan, George	Irish Parliamentary Party
Tyrone North	Dodd, William	Liberal
Tyrone South	Russell, Thomas	Russelite -> Liberal
Uxbridge	Dixon-Hartland, Sir Frederick	Conservative
Wakefield	Brotherton, Edward	Conservative
Walsall	Dunne, Edward	Liberal
Walthamstow	Simon, John	**Liberal**
Walworth	O'Donnell, Charles	**Liberal**
Wandsworth	Kimber, Sir Henry	Conservative
Wansbeck	Fenwick, Charles	Liberal
Warrington	Crosfield, Arthur	**Liberal**
Warwick and Leamington	Berridge, Thomas	**Liberal**
Waterford City	Redmond, John	Irish Parliamentary Party
Waterford East	Power, Patrick	Irish Parliamentary Party
Waterford West	O'Shee, J. J.	Irish Parliamentary Party
Watford	Micklem, Nathaniel	**Liberal**
Wednesbury	Hyde, Clarendon	**Liberal**
Wellington (Shropshire)	Henry, Charles	**Liberal**
Wellington (Somerset)	Fuller-Acland-Hood, Rt Hon. Sir Alexander	Conservative
Wells	Silcock, Thomas	**Liberal**
West Bromwich	Hazel, Alfred	**Liberal**
West Ham North	Masterman, Charles	**Liberal**
West Ham South	Thorne, Will	**Labour**
Westbury	Fuller, John	Liberal
Westhoughton	Wilson, William	**Labour**
Westmeath North	Ginnell, Laurence	Irish Parliamentary Party
Westmeath South	Sullivan, Donal	Irish Parliamentary Party
Westminster	Burdett-Coutts, William	Conservative
Wexford North	Esmonde, Sir Thomas	Irish Parliamentary Party
Wexford South	Ffrench, Peter	Irish Parliamentary Party
Whitby	Beckett, Gervase	**Conservative**
Whitechapel	Samuel, Stuart	Liberal
Whitehaven	Burnyeat, William	**Liberal**
Wick Burghs	Bignold, Sir Arthur	Conservative
Wicklow East	Cogan, Denis	Irish Parliamentary Party
Wicklow West	O'Connor, James	Irish Parliamentary Party
Widnes	Walker, William	Conservative
Wigan	Powell, Sir Francis	Conservative
Wigtownshire	Viscount Dalrymple	Conservative
Wilton	Morse, Levi	**Liberal**
Wimbledon	Hambro, Eric	Conservative
Winchester	Baring, Hon. Guy	Conservative
Windsor	Mason, James	Conservative
Wirral	Lever, William	**Liberal**
Wisbech	Beck, Cecil	Liberal
Wokingham	Gardner, Ernest	Conservative
Wolverhampton East	**Fowler, Rt Hon. Sir Henry**	Liberal
Wolverhampton South	Norman, Henry	Liberal
Wolverhampton West	Richards, Thomas	**Labour**
Woodbridge	Everett, Robert	**Liberal**
Woodstock	Bennett, Ernest	**Liberal**
Woolwich	Crooks, Will	Labour
Worcester	Williamson, George	Conservative
Worcestershire East	Chamberlain, Rt Hon. Austen	Liberal Unionist
Worcestershire North	Wilson, John William	Liberal
Wycombe	Herbert, Arnold	**Liberal**
York (Two members)	Greenwood, Hamar	**Liberal**
York (Two members)	Faber, Denison	Conservative

== By-elections ==
1 November 1906: Galway Borough – Stephen Gwynn (Irish Parliamentary Party) replacing Charles Ramsay Devlin (Irish Parliamentary Party) who resigned, returned to Canada.

31 December 1906: Cork Mid – D. D. Sheehan (Independent Labour) returned unopposed after he was expelled from the Irish Parliamentary Party, resigned his seat and restood on an Independent Labour ticket.

13 April 1907: Westmeath South – Sir Walter Nugent, 4th Baronet (Irish Parliamentary Party) replacing Donal Sullivan (Irish Parliamentary Party) who died 3 March'

20 June 1907: Monaghan North – James Lardner (Irish Parliamentary Party) replacing Patrick O'Hare (Irish Parliamentary Party) who resigned on the grounds of ill-health.

21 February 1908: North Leitrim – Francis Meehan (Irish Parliamentary Party) replacing Charles Dolan (Irish Parliamentary Party) who resigned order to re-fight the constituency on behalf of Sinn Féin.

1 May 1909: Cork City – Maurice Healy (Independent Nationalist) replacing William O'Brien (Irish Parliamentary Party) who had resigned.

August 1909: Sligo North – Thomas Scanlan (Irish Parliamentary Party) replacing P. A. McHugh (Irish Parliamentary Party).

== Sources ==
Whitaker's Almanack, 1907

== See also ==
- UK general election, 1906
- List of parliaments of the United Kingdom
