= 1912 Bolton by-election =

UK parliamentary by-election

The 1912 Bolton by-election was a parliamentary by-election held for the British House of Commons constituency of Bolton in Lancashire on 23 November 1912. Bolton returned two Members of Parliament to the House of Commons of the United Kingdom, elected by the first past the post voting system.

== Vacancy ==
George Harwood had been Liberal MP for the seat of Bolton since the 1895 general election. In 1912, the seat became vacant when he died on 7 November 1912 at the age of 67.

== Electoral history ==
At the previous general election in December 1910, the two members elected were George Harwood for the Liberals and A. H. Gill for the Labour Party. There had been an arrangement between the Labour and Liberal parties in this seat since the time of the 1906 election when Gill was first returned.

General election December 1910: Bolton Electorate 21,341
Party	Candidate	Votes	%	±%
Liberal	✓ George Harwood	10,358	35.5	+4.0
Labour	✓ Alfred Henry Gill	10,108	34.7	+4.2
Conservative	G Hesketh	8,697	29.8	−8.2
Majority		1,661	5.7	−6.6
Majority		1,411	4.9	−6.4
Turnout		29,163	89.3	−4.5
Liberal hold		Swing	+6.1	
Labour hold		Swing	+6.2	

== Candidates ==
- Bolton Liberals chose 61-year-old Thomas Taylor as their candidate to defend the seat. Taylor was born in Bolton, the son of a corn merchant and was educated at the Bolton Church Institute. He was apprenticed at the age of 15 years to a firm of cotton manufacturers - the staple industry of Bolton. He worked his way up through the ranks to become manager of the Albert, then of the Cobden Mill and later joined the Board of the company. In 1894 he resigned and set up his own company at the Saville Mill. He was appointed a Justice of the Peace in Bolton in 1906 and was a member of the local Schools Board, as well as being an Examiner for Cotton Weaving for the City and Guilds in London.
- The Unionists changed their candidate and fielded Arthur Brooks, who had not contested a parliamentary election before. He was a retired schoolmaster from nearby Burnley but had moved to Bolton and had been elected to Bolton Town Council.
- The Labour Party agreed not to stand a candidate in the by-election.
- There was talk of two Socialist candidates standing. Thomas William Stewart, a member of the Free Thought Socialist League and a lecturer backed by wealthy London friends announced his candidature. Then another Socialist, Bolton resident Joseph Leach, the National Secretary of the Industrial Socialist Party, announced he was standing. However, neither could gain the support of any significant Socialist branches in the Bolton area.

== Campaign ==
Polling Day was set for 23 November, just 16 days after the death of Harwood. The Bolton Trades Council gave support to the Liberal Taylor's candidacy, with a manifesto issued warning of a "Tory conspiracy to smash the trade unions". The Welsh Church Bill featured in the campaign with Brooks pledging himself to oppose it, hoping this might gain him some Church of England support. The dominant issue of the campaign was the Unionist policy of Tariff Reform which had never been popular among those involved in the Lancashire cotton industry. This helped the Liberal Taylor, who was an advocate of Free Trade and against the Unionist Brooks, who supported protectionism.

== Result ==
There was an unexpectedly heavy turnout of about 90%. The result of the poll was declared shortly after ten o'clock.

Bolton by-election, 1912 Electorate
Party	Candidate	Votes	%	±%
Liberal	Thomas Taylor	10,011	53.1	+17.6
Unionist	Arthur Brooks	8,835	46.9	+17.1
Majority		1,176	6.2	+0.5
Turnout		18,846	circa 90.0	−0.4
Liberal hold		Swing		

Despite the slight decrease in Liberal vote and majority, the local Liberals seemed genuinely pleased at retaining a four figure majority. Taylor put his victory down to "the unalterable determination of the working people of Lancashire to have nothing to do with Tariff Reform", which he predicted would raise the price of food and "bring starvation again into [working class] homes". After the poll, The Times tried to undermine the Liberal victory and explain away the Unionist defeat by stating; “It is probable that this (Trades Council) manifesto had the effect of turning the full tide of the labour vote in favour of the Liberal candidate. And the labour vote decided the election.” Even the defeated Brooks agreed that the labour vote went solidly to the Liberals because of their “distorted” version of Tariff Reform.

== Aftermath ==
Two months later the Unionists decided to drop their tariff reform policies. Taylor sat as MP until resigning shortly before his death in 1916. The Liberals won the 1916 Bolton by-election. Brooks did not stand for parliament again.
