= Michael Conway (Irish nationalist politician) =

Irish and British politician

Michael Conway (c. 1844 – 1921) was an Irish nationalist politician and a teacher. A member of the Irish Parliamentary Party, he was Member of Parliament (MP) for North Leitrim from 1885 to 1892 in the House of Commons of the United Kingdom of Great Britain and Ireland. He was a supporter of Charles Stewart Parnell.

Conway was born in Leeds, Yorkshire, the son of Edward Conway of Moylough, near Tubbercurry, County Sligo. At the age of 13 he became a pupil teacher at St Anne's, Blackburn, Lancashire, and after five years entered St Mary's Training College, Hammersmith, London, which was run by the Brompton Oratory Fathers. From 1865 he was engaged in education. In 1871 he married Anne, daughter of Andrew Leonard of Aclare, County Sligo. He was headmaster at St Anthony's School, Scotland Road, Liverpool for twelve years from 1873 until his election to Parliament.

Conway was an active Irish Nationalist and President of the Blackburn, Lancashire, Branch of the Irish National League of Great Britain. On 28 October 1885 he was selected at Carrick-on-Shannon as Nationalist candidate for the new seat of North Leitrim and in the December 1885 general election by almost 10 to 1 over a Conservative. He was then returned unopposed in 1886. He appears to have remained resident in Blackburn at least for a time as he was reported as presiding at a Nationalist meeting there on 30 November 1886.

When the Irish Parliamentary Party split in December 1890 over Parnell's leadership, Conway supported Parnell. He strongly supported Parnell in the week-long meeting of the Party in Committee Room 15 of the House of Commons. Lyons commented that he had a ‘futile altercation’ with the Anti-Parnellite Thomas Sexton, and he also clashed with Tim Healy.

At the general election of 1892, Conway did not contest North Leitrim but fought Mid Tipperary as a Parnellite. However the Anti-Parnellite candidate won comfortably, Conway receiving just under one fifth of the vote in a three-cornered fight. He did not stand for Parliament again.

Conway initially returned to teaching, then moved to America in 1903 where he established The Conway Civil Service School. He returned to Blackburn in 1920 and died in January 1921, he is buried at Pleasington Priory.

== Sources ==
- F. S. L. Lyons, The Fall of Parnell 1890-91, London, Routledge & Kegan Paul, 1960
- The Times, 27 October and 1 December 1885, 30 November 1886.
- Brian M. Walker (ed.), Parliamentary Election Results in Ireland, 1801-1922, Dublin, Royal Irish Academy, 1978

Parliament of the United Kingdom
New constituency	Member of Parliament for North Leitrim; 1885 – 1892	Succeeded by P. A. McHugh
