= 1906 North Leitrim by-election =

Irish election

The 1906 North Leitrim by-election was held on 28 February 1906 after P. A. McHugh resigned. McHugh had been elected for the Irish Parliamentary Party in the 1906 general election for both North Leitrim and North Sligo. As he could only take one seat he chose North Sligo, so creating a vacancy.

The seat was retained by Charles Dolan who stood for the Irish Parliamentary Party. The by-election was uncontested.
