= 1887 South Sligo by-election =

UK Parliamentary by-election

The 1887 South Sligo by-election was a parliamentary by-election held for the United Kingdom House of Commons constituency of South Sligo on 7 February 1887. The sitting member, Thomas Sexton of the Irish Parliamentary Party had been re-elected in the general election of 1886, but having been elected also in the constituency of Belfast West, he chose to sit for the latter. In the ensuing by-election another Irish Parliamentary Party candidate, Edward Joseph Kennedy, was elected unopposed.
