= 1900 North Sligo by-election =

UK Parliamentary by-election

The 1900 North Sligo by-election was a Parliamentary by-election held on 7 March 1900. The constituency returned one Member of Parliament (MP) to the House of Commons of the United Kingdom, elected by the first past the post voting system.

The seat had become vacant following the resignation of the incumbent Irish Parliamentary Party MP, Bernard Collery who had been elected for the Irish National Federation (Anti-Parnellite). Collery vacated his Parliamentary seat by being appointed Steward of the Chiltern Hundreds on 27 January 1900. Collery had been Member of Parliament for the constituency since the 1891 by-election.

== Candidates ==
The Executive of the United Irish League met on Wednesday 14 February to select a candidate and unanimously selected John O'Dowd. O'Dowd was a shop-keeper and farmer from Bunnanadden. He was also chairman of Sligo County Council.

The name of Henry Brennan, the vice-chairman of the County Council, was also submitted, but Brennan withdrew his candidature for the sake of unity.

== Result ==
The writ for the by-election was issued on Friday 23 February, and was received in Sligo on Monday 26 February.

The date for nominations was set for Wednesday 7 March and polling day for Tuesday 13 March. As only one candidate was nominated, there was no poll.

1900 North Sligo by-election
Party	Candidate	Votes	%	±%
Irish Parliamentary	John O'Dowd	Unopposed		
Registered electors		8,629		
Irish Parliamentary hold				
