= J. J. Clancy (Sinn Féin politician) =

Irish politician (1890–1932)

Teachta Dála
- In office December 1918 – May 1921
- Constituency: Sligo North

Personal details
- Born: John Joseph Clancy; 23 January 1890 Collooney, County Sligo, Ireland
- Died: 1 May 1932 (aged 42) Limerick, Ireland
- Party: Sinn Féin
- Children: 4

John Joseph Clancy (23 January 1890 – 1 May 1932) was an Irish politician and Sinn Féin Teachta Dála (TD) of the First Dáil for Sligo North from 1918 to 1921.

He was a native of Ballygrania, Collooney, County Sligo and a nephew of John Joseph Clancy, bishop of Elphin from 1895 to 1912. He was educated at Summerhill College, Sligo, and worked on the staff of the Congested Districts Board before becoming Secretary to the Sligo County Committee of Agriculture.

In September 1917 Clancy was elected president of the Sinn Féin executive for North Sligo. While in prison on 15 September 1918 he was selected as Sinn Féin candidate for North Sligo, and in the 1918 general election, he was elected as part of the Sinn Féin landslide, defeating the Nationalist Thomas Scanlan who had sat for the Sligo North seat since 1909, by 9,030 to 4,242. Like the other Sinn Féin members, Clancy did not take his seat at Westminster but took part in the revolutionary First Dáil in Dublin.

Clancy was also Chairman of Sligo County Council. At the first meeting of the County Council on 22 June 1920 he said that their work as a council would be guided towards clearing Britain out of Ireland. He later served as an officer in the Irish Free State Army.

He was imprisoned several times and was a hunger striker. He was one of those arrested in May 1918 on allegations of a German plot and was interned in Usk prison. He was arrested twice in 1919, on 15 January and 7 April, and was already serving a term of three months imprisonment when he was sentenced to a further three months with hard labour on 6 June 1919, for unlawful assembly.

Clancy served only one term as a TD. He was not re-selected as the Sinn Féin candidate for Sligo for the general election of May 1921. The RIC County Inspector thought that this was because his 'views were not extreme enough - he did not approve of police murders etc.'; Sinn Féin headquarters queried his deselection but received no response from Sligo. Clancy had fallen out with the local IRA over finance. On the instructions of the Dáil, Sligo County Council refused to submit its accounts for audit to the British authorities, who then withdrew all grants and loans, causing a financial crisis and a large increase in the rates. The County Council called on the IRA for assistance with rate collection, but they raided rate collectors and tendered to the Council money which had already been collected. They also demanded £1,000 as poundage or commission but this was refused on the basis that they had not collected the money. The IRA were led by Robert George Bradshaw, a man who had arrived in Sligo from Dublin in 1915, having just been released from Mountjoy prison with a caution, where he had been remanded for fraud. Clancy on his own responsibility offered them £500; they refused and ordered him to have £1,000 ready 'or take the consequences'. Clancy handed over the money. The demand was branded 'entirely irregular' by Richard Mulcahy, IRA Chief of Staff, and after an investigation, Sligo IRA was ordered to repay the money but apparently never did. Farry comments that 'Clancy's initial refusal of the IRA's demand for payment for collecting the rates was not forgiven by that body. This may also explain why he, the sitting TD for North Sligo, was not selected for the 1921 election'.

He was married with four children. On 3 May 1932, when he was 42, his body was found in the River Shannon at Limerick. He had gone to Mass in Tipperary on Sunday 1 May but had not returned. The verdict at the inquest on 4 May was that he had drowned accidentally. He was interred at his wife's family burial place at Ardmoyle, County Tipperary.

== Sources ==
- Dod's Parliamentary Companion, London, 1920
- Michael Farry, The Irish Revolution, 1912-23: Sligo, Dublin, Four Courts Press, 2012
- The Irish Times, 16 February, 8 April & 7 June 1919; 23 June 1920; 5 & 6 May 1932
- Brian M. Walker (ed.), Parliamentary Election Results in Ireland, 1801–1922, Dublin, Royal Irish Academy, 1978

Parliament of the United Kingdom
Preceded by Thomas Scanlan	Member of Parliament for Sligo North; 1918–1922	Constituency abolished
Oireachtas
New constituency	Teachta Dála for Sligo North; 1918–1921	Constituency abolished
