= Edmund Leamy =

Irish politician

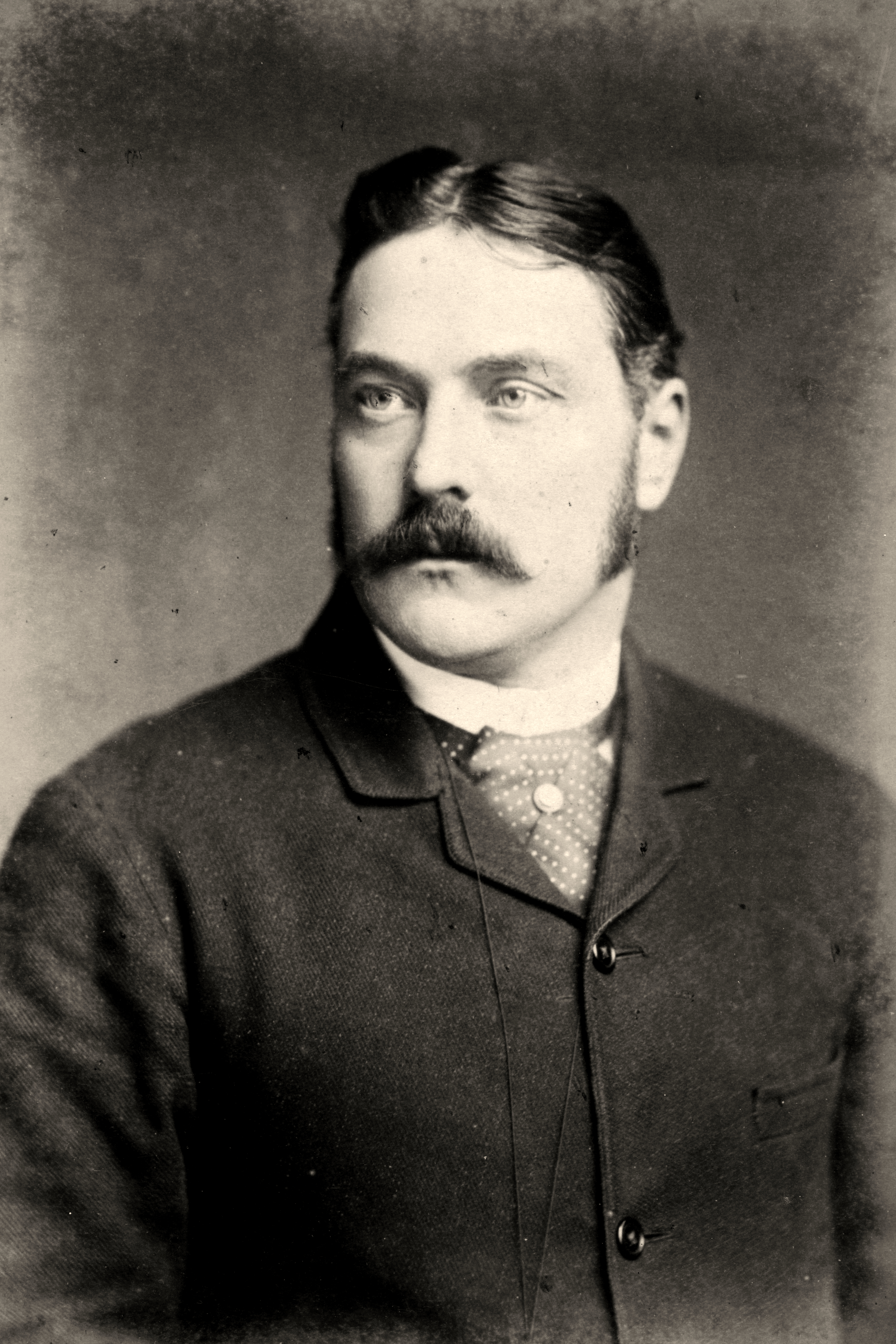
- Leamy, c. 1880s

Member of Parliament
- In office 1880–1885
- Preceded by: Purcell O'Gorman and Richard Power
- Succeeded by: Richard Power
- Constituency: Waterford City
- In office 1885–1887
- Preceded by: New Constituency
- Succeeded by: William O'Brien
- Constituency: North East Cork
- In office 1888–1892
- Preceded by: Edward Joseph Kennedy
- Succeeded by: Thomas Curran
- Constituency: South Sligo
- In office 1900–1904
- Preceded by: Charles John Engledow
- Succeeded by: John O'Connor
- Constituency: North Kildare

Personal details
- Born: 1848 Waterford, Ireland
- Died: 10 December 1904 (aged 55–56) Pau, Pyrénées-Atlantiques, France
- Resting place: Waterford, Ireland
- Party: Irish Parliamentary Party

Edmund Leamy (1848 – 10 December 1904) was an Irish journalist, barrister, author of fairy tales, and nationalist politician. He was a Member of Parliament (MP) in the House of Commons of the United Kingdom of Great Britain and Ireland as member of the Irish Parliamentary Party. A leading supporter of Charles Stewart Parnell, he represented various Irish seats for much of the period from 1880 until his death in 1904.

== Life ==
Leamy was educated at the University High School, Waterford and at the Jesuits' Tullabeg College, Co. Offaly.

Called to the Irish Bar in 1885, Leamy was in 1880 elected as a Parnellite Home Ruler to one of the two seats for Waterford City. When representation at Waterford was reduced to one seat at the 1885 election, he stood down but was elected unopposed at Cork North East in 1885 and again in 1886. He also stood at Mid Armagh in 1885, but was not elected. Resigning from Cork North East in 1887, he was elected unopposed to a vacancy at South Sligo in 1888.

When the Irish Parliamentary Party split in December 1890 over Parnell's leadership, Leamy was one of the minority in the Irish National League who supported Parnell. Parnell made him editor of his newspaper United Ireland after regaining editorial control in 1891. At the subsequent general election in 1892, Leamy unsuccessfully contested East Waterford. He also unsuccessfully contested Galway as a Parnellite in 1895 and as candidate for the reunited Irish Party in 1900. However, in 1900 he was re-elected to the House of Commons as a Nationalist member for North Kildare, serving until his death in 1904.

He died at Pau in southern France where he was staying for the sake of his health. At the request of John Redmond, Pat O'Brien went out to Pau to accompany Leamy's widow and the body for their return to Waterford for the funeral on 21 December 1904.

Leamy's fairy tales, including The Golden Spears, By the Barrow River and The Fairy Minstrel of Glenmalure, have been reprinted several times in various editions in Ireland and the USA.

The book Parnell’s Faithful Few by his widow Margaret Leamy contains a good deal of biographical material and is a significant source for the history of the Parnellite split in the Irish Parliamentary Party.

== Selected writings ==
- Irish Fairy Tales, Dublin, M. H. Gill & Son, Ltd., 1906
- By the Barrow River and Other Stories, Dublin, Sealy, Bryers and Walker, 1907
- The Golden Spears, and Other Fairy Tales, New York, Desmond FitzGerald, inc., 1911
- The Fairy Minstrel of Glenmalure: And Other Stories for Children, New York, Desmond FitzGerald, inc., 1913
- Irish Fairy Tales, Dublin, Mercier Press, 1978
- Irish Fairy Stories for Children, illustrated by Frank and Gail Dowling, Dublin, Mercier Press; Chester Springs, PA (Dufour Editions, US distributor), 1983, repr. 1992
- Leigh Rayment's Historical List of MPs

== Sources ==
- Freeman's Journal, 12 and 22 December 1904
- Margaret Leamy, Parnell’s Faithful Few, New York, Macmillan, 1936
- Brian M. Walker (ed.), Parliamentary Election Results in Ireland, 1801-1922, Dublin, Royal Irish Academy, 1978
- Who Was Who, 1897-1916

Parliament of the United Kingdom
Preceded by Purcell O'Gorman and Richard Power	Member of Parliament for Waterford City; 1880 – 1885; With: Richard Power	Succeeded by Richard Power
New constituency	Member of Parliament for North East Cork; 1885 – 1887	Succeeded by William O'Brien
Preceded by Edward Joseph Kennedy	Member of Parliament for South Sligo; 1888 – 1892	Succeeded by Thomas Curran
Preceded by Charles John Engledow	Member of Parliament for North Kildare; 1900 – 1904	Succeeded by John O'Connor
