= Thomas Taylor (Liberal politician) =

British politician (1851–1916)

Thomas Taylor (31 January 1851 – 17 December 1916) was a British Liberal Party politician.

Taylor was born in Bolton, the son of a corn merchant and was educated at the Bolton Church Institute. He was apprenticed at the age of 15 years to a firm of cotton manufacturers—the staple industry of Bolton at that time. He worked his way up through the ranks to become manager of the Albert, then of the Cobden Mill and later joined the Board of the company. In 1894 he resigned and set up his own company at the Saville Mill. He was appointed a justice of the peace in Bolton in 1906 and was a member of the local Schools Board, as well as being an Examiner for Cotton Weaving for the City and Guilds in London.

Taylor was elected as member of parliament for Bolton at a by-election in 1912, but resigned in 1916 and died later that year aged 65. He is buried in St Peter's churchyard, Halliwell, Bolton. He had married Mary Ellen Lomax in 1874 and with her had two daughters and a son, Herbert, who was later elected as a local councillor.

Parliament of the United Kingdom
Preceded by George Harwood and Alfred Henry Gill	Member of Parliament for Bolton; 1912–1916; With: Alfred Henry Gill, to 1914; Robert Tootill, from 1914	Succeeded by Robert Tootill and William Edge
