= 1916 Bolton by-election =

UK parliamentary by-election

The 1916 Bolton by-election was a parliamentary by-election held for the British House of Commons constituency of Bolton on 29 February 1916. The seat had become vacant when the Liberal Thomas Taylor (one of the constituency's two Members of Parliament) resigned. Taylor had also won the seat at a by-election four years earlier.

The Liberal candidate, William Edge, was returned unopposed, due to a war time electoral pact where none of the major parties put up candidates against the incumbent party. He took his seat in Parliament on 2 March 1916.

== See also ==
- List of United Kingdom by-elections (1900–1918)
