= Bernard Collery =

Bernard Collery (1838 – 5 July 1907) was an Irish businessman and politician.

He was a member of Sligo Borough Council and Mayor of the city from 1882 to 1884. In 1882, he presented the city with a Mayor's chain of office, which is still used today.

In 1891 he was nominated as candidate of the Anti-Parnellite Irish National Federation faction of the Irish Parliamentary Party in a by-election in North Sligo. He won by a substantial majority over the Parnellite candidate, and remained as member for North Sligo until resigning in late January 1900.

== Endnotes ==
Parliament of the United Kingdom
Preceded by Peter McDonald	Member of Parliament for North Sligo; 1891 – 1900	Succeeded by John O'Dowd
