= South Sligo =

Former parliamentary constituency in the United Kingdom

- Former county constituency for the House of Commons

1885–1922
- Seats: 1
- Created from: County Sligo
- Replaced by: Sligo–Mayo East

South Sligo was a parliamentary constituency in Ireland, which returned one Member of Parliament (MP) to the House of Commons of the Parliament of the United Kingdom, elected on a system of first-past-the-post, from 1885 to 1922.

Prior to the 1885 general election the area was part of the two-seat County Sligo constituency. From 1922, on the establishment of the Irish Free State, it was not represented in the UK Parliament.

== Boundaries ==
This constituency comprised the southern part of County Sligo.

1885–1922: The baronies of Coolavin, Corran and Tirerrill, and that part of the Barony of Leyny not contained within the constituency of North Sligo.

== Members of Parliament ==
Year	Member	Party
1885	Thomas Sexton	Nationalist
1887	Edward Joseph Kennedy	Nationalist
1888	Edmund Leamy	Nationalist
1892	Thomas Curran	Anti-Parnellite
1900	John O'Dowd	Nationalist
1918	Alexander McCabe	Sinn Féin

== Elections ==
=== Elections in the 1880s ===
General election 3 December 1885: South Sligo
Party	Candidate	Votes	%	±%
Irish Parliamentary	Thomas Sexton	5,151	90.5	
Irish Conservative	Alexander Perceval	541	9.5	
Majority		4,610	81.0	
Turnout		5,692	74.0	
Registered electors		7,693		
Irish Parliamentary win (new seat)				

General election 3 July 1886: South Sligo
Party	Candidate	Votes	%	±%
Irish Parliamentary	Thomas Sexton	Unopposed		
Registered electors		7,693		
Irish Parliamentary hold				

Sexton is also elected MP for Belfast West and opts to sit there, causing a by-election.

By-election 7 February 1887: Sligo South
Party	Candidate	Votes	%	±%
Irish Parliamentary	Edward Joseph Kennedy	Unopposed		
Registered electors		8,209		
Irish Parliamentary hold				

Kennedy resigns, causing a second by-election.

By-election 6 July 1888: Sligo South
Party	Candidate	Votes	%	±%
Irish Parliamentary	Edmund Leamy	Unopposed		
Registered electors		8,447		
Irish Parliamentary hold				

=== Elections in the 1890s ===
General election 11 July 1892: South Sligo
Party	Candidate	Votes	%	±%
Irish National Federation	Thomas Bartholomew Curran	4,300	88.7	N/A
Irish Unionist	John ffolliott	548	11.3	New
Majority		3,752	77.4	N/A
Turnout		4,848	60.2	N/A
Registered electors		8,055		
Irish National Federation gain from Irish Parliamentary		Swing	N/A	

General election 19 July 1895: South Sligo
Party	Candidate	Votes	%	±%
Irish National Federation	Thomas Bartholomew Curran	3,717	87.7	−1.0
Irish Unionist	James Campbell	522	12.3	+1.0
Majority		3,195	75.4	−2.0
Turnout		4,239	58.9	−1.3
Registered electors		7,203		
Irish National Federation hold		Swing	−1.0	

=== Elections in the 1900s ===
General election 2 October 1900: South Sligo
Party	Candidate	Votes	%	±%
Irish Parliamentary	John O'Dowd	Unopposed		
Registered electors		7,670		
Irish Parliamentary hold				

General election 17 January 1906: South Sligo
Party	Candidate	Votes	%	±%
Irish Parliamentary	John O'Dowd	Unopposed		
Registered electors		7,273		
Irish Parliamentary hold				

=== Elections in the 1910s ===
General election 19 January 1910: South Sligo
Party	Candidate	Votes	%	±%
Irish Parliamentary	John O'Dowd	Unopposed		
Registered electors		7,096		
Irish Parliamentary hold				

General election 8 December 1910: South Sligo
Party	Candidate	Votes	%	±%
Irish Parliamentary	John O'Dowd	Unopposed		
Registered electors		7,096		
Irish Parliamentary hold				

General Election 14 December 1918: South Sligo
Party	Candidate	Votes	%	±%
Sinn Féin	Alexander McCabe	9,113	82.1	New
Irish Parliamentary	John O'Dowd	1,988	17.9	N/A
Majority		7,125	64.2	N/A
Turnout		11,101	61.7	N/A
Registered electors		18,013		
Sinn Féin gain from Irish Parliamentary		Swing	N/A	
