= 1888 South Sligo by-election =

UK Parliamentary by-election

The 1888 South Sligo by-election was a parliamentary by-election held for the United Kingdom House of Commons constituency of South Sligo on 6 July 1888. The vacancy arose because of the resignation of the sitting member, Edward Joseph Kennedy of the Irish Parliamentary Party. Only one candidate was nominated, Edmund Leamy of the Irish Parliamentary Party, formerly MP for Waterford City and Cork North East, who was elected unopposed.
