= Thomas Curran (South Sligo MP) =

Thomas Curran (1840 – 13 August 1913) was an Irish nationalist politician from County Donegal who served as a Member of Parliament (MP) for the Anti-Parnellite Irish National Federation in the United Kingdom House of Commons.

He was elected as MP for the South Sligo at the 1892 general election, and held the seat until the 1900 general election. His son Thomas Bartholomew Curran (1870–1929) sat in Parliament for the same period, as MP first for Kilkenny City and then for North Donegal.

Both father and son owed their election to the Irish National Federation to whom Thomas senior made an unsecured loan of £10,000 to fund their campaign in the 1892 general election. According to Tim Healy:

Thomas Curran, a hotel-keeper in Sydney (New South Wales), came to our rescue by lending £10,000 without security. Although he was repaid, his generosity deserves remembrance. He was a man by no means sentimentally moulded. When I learnt to know him I thought him of the type least likely to make a sacrifice. We put his son (then a law student in London) up for the City of Kilkenny, and himself for Sligo, and both were elected.

Parliament of the United Kingdom
Preceded by Edmund Leamy	Member of Parliament for South Sligo; 1892 – 1900	Succeeded by John O'Dowd
