= Amalgamated Union of Machine and General Labourers =

- Merged into: National Union of General Workers
- Founded: 1890
- Dissolved: 1916
- Headquarters: 77 St Georges Road, Bolton
- Location: England
- Members: 2,000 (1896)
- Key people: Robert Tootill (Gen Sec)
- Affiliations: TUC

The Amalgamated Union of Machine and General Workers was a general union representing workers in and around Lancashire in England.

The union was founded in 1890 in Bolton as the Amalgamated Machine and General Labourers' Union, and quickly developed a large membership, which peaked at 2,000 in 1896. That year, 210 members left to form the rival Heywood and District Union of Machine and General Labour, and the membership in general dropped dramatically, falling to a low of only 77 members in 1897.

Despite this dramatic fall in membership, the union survived and slowly rebuilt. By 1904 it had 650 members, and by the end of 1915 it was over 1,000. The following year, it joined the National Union of Gasworkers and General Labourers. As a result of the merger, the Gasworkers Union renamed itself as the National Union of General Workers.

== General Secretaries ==
1890: Robert Tootill
1901: Sam Fielding
1906: Robert Tootill
