= Michael Joseph Flavin =

Irish politician

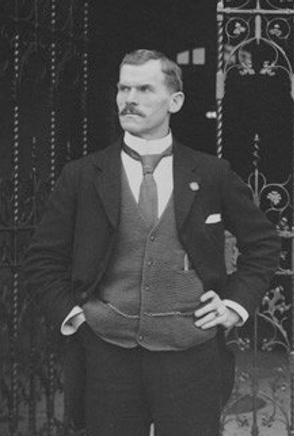
Michael Joseph Flavin in 1901

Michael Joseph Flavin (1866 – 3 May 1944) was an Irish Nationalist Member of Parliament for North Kerry, 1896–1918.

Flavin was born at Ballyduff, near Listowel. He was the son of James Flavin and Joan or Johanna Mangan. He was educated at national schools, at St. Michael's College, Listowel (a Catholic diocesan secondary school), and privately. He was a merchant in Listowel and Tralee, president of the Listowel Young Ireland Society and was a member of Kerry County Council and of the committee governing the County Infirmary, Tralee, the County Fever Hospital, Tralee and the County Mental Hospital, Killarney. He married Mary Elizabeth Fitzgerald and they had three sons and two daughters.

In April 1896 he was returned unopposed as Anti-Parnellite Nationalist M.P. for North Kerry after the resignation of Thomas Sexton. Following the reunification of the Irish Parliamentary Party, he held the seat unopposed in 1900 and 1906. In January 1910 he faced a challenge from an independent Nationalist, Thomas Stack, but was easily returned by 2,637 votes to 885. In December 1910 he was again returned unopposed. He did not stand in the general election of 1918.

He died at Tralee on 3 May 1944.

== Notes ==
Parliament of the United Kingdom
Preceded by John Stack	Member of Parliament for North Kerry; 1896 – 1918	Succeeded by James Crowley
