= 1909 North Sligo by-election =

UK Parliamentary by-election

The 1909 North Sligo by-election was held on 5 August 1909. The by-election was held due to the death of the incumbent Irish Parliamentary MP, P. A. McHugh. It was won by the Irish Parliamentary candidate Thomas Scanlan, who was unopposed.
