= Edward Joseph Kennedy =

Irish politician

Member of Parliament for South Sligo
- In office 7 February 1887 – 6 July 1888
- Preceded by: Thomas Sexton
- Succeeded by: Edmund Leamy

Lord Mayor of Dublin
- In office 1880–1881
- Preceded by: Thomas Sexton
- Succeeded by: Joseph Meade

Personal details
- Born: 1851 County Cavan, Ireland
- Party: Irish Nationalist

Edward Joseph Kennedy (born Cavan, 1851) was an Irish politician. He was elected as an Irish Nationalist Member of Parliament for South Sligo in 1887, resigning in 1888 by becoming Steward of the Manor of Northstead. He served as Lord Mayor of Dublin from 1890 to 1891.

Parliament of the United Kingdom
Preceded by Thomas Sexton	Member of Parliament for South Sligo; 1887–1888	Succeeded by Edmund Leamy
Civic offices
Preceded by Thomas Sexton	Lord Mayor of Dublin; 1890–1891	Succeeded by Joseph Meade
