= James Crowley (politician) =

Irish politician (1879–1946)

Teachta Dála
- In office August 1923 – February 1932
- Constituency: Kerry
- In office May 1921 – August 1923
- Constituency: Kerry–Limerick West
- In office December 1918 – May 1921
- Constituency: Kerry North

Personal details
- Born: 16 October 1879 County Kerry, Ireland
- Died: 21 January 1946 (aged 66)
- Party: Cumann na nGaedheal
- Other political affiliations: Sinn Féin (until 1923)
- Spouse: Clementine Boursin
- Children: 3
- Occupation: Veterinary Surgeon

James Crowley (16 October 1879 – 21 January 1946) was an Irish nationalist politician and veterinary surgeon.

He was born at William Street in Listowel, County Kerry and was the son of butcher Michael Crowley and Jane O'Connor. He was a member of the Irish Volunteers. He was elected at the 1918 general election as a Sinn Féin MP for the Kerry North constituency. In January 1919, Sinn Féin MPs refused to recognise the Parliament of the United Kingdom and instead assembled at the Mansion House in Dublin as a revolutionary parliament called Dáil Éireann. At the official roll call, Crowley was marked "fé ghlas ag Gallaibh" (imprisoned by the foreign enemy).

During the War of Independence he was interned in the Curragh Camp. He was elected at the 1921 elections as a Sinn Féin Teachta Dála (TD) for Kerry–Limerick West and was released after the truce. He supported the Anglo-Irish Treaty and voted in favour of it. He was re-elected at the 1922 general election as a Pro-Treaty Sinn Féin TD and subsequently as a Cumann na nGaedheal TD at the 1923 general election for the Kerry constituency. He lost his seat at the 1932 general election and retired from politics.

Crowley was married in Tralee in November 1909 to Clementine Boursin and raised a family.

== Sources ==
- Todd Andrews (1979), Dublin Made Me.

Parliament of the United Kingdom
Preceded by Michael Joseph Flavin	Member of Parliament for Kerry North; 1918–1922	Constituency abolished
Oireachtas
New constituency	Teachta Dála for Kerry North; 1918–1921	Constituency abolished

Dáil	Election	Deputy (Party)	Deputy (Party)	Deputy (Party)	Deputy (Party)	Deputy (Party)	Deputy (Party)	Deputy (Party)	Deputy (Party)
2nd	1921	Piaras Béaslaí (SF)	James Crowley (SF)	Fionán Lynch (SF)	Patrick Cahill (SF)	Con Collins (SF)	Thomas O'Donoghue (SF)	Edmund Roche (SF)	Austin Stack (SF)
3rd	1922	Piaras Béaslaí (PT-SF)	James Crowley (PT-SF)	Fionán Lynch (PT-SF)	Patrick Cahill (AT-SF)	Con Collins (AT-SF)	Thomas O'Donoghue (AT-SF)	Edmund Roche (AT-SF)	Austin Stack (AT-SF)
4th	1923	Constituency abolished. See Kerry and Limerick							

Dáil	Election	Deputy (Party)	Deputy (Party)	Deputy (Party)	Deputy (Party)	Deputy (Party)	Deputy (Party)	Deputy (Party)
4th	1923	Tom McEllistrim (Rep)	Austin Stack (Rep)	Patrick Cahill (Rep)	Thomas O'Donoghue (Rep)	James Crowley (CnaG)	Fionán Lynch (CnaG)	John O'Sullivan (CnaG)
5th	1927 (Jun)	Tom McEllistrim (FF)	Austin Stack (SF)	William O'Leary (FF)	Thomas O'Reilly (FF)	James Crowley (CnaG)	Fionán Lynch (CnaG)	John O'Sullivan (CnaG)
6th	1927 (Sep)	Tom McEllistrim (FF)	Frederick Crowley (FF)	William O'Leary (FF)	Thomas O'Reilly (FF)	James Crowley (CnaG)	Fionán Lynch (CnaG)	John O'Sullivan (CnaG)
7th	1932	Tom McEllistrim (FF)	Frederick Crowley (FF)	John Flynn (FF)	Thomas O'Reilly (FF)	Eamon Kissane (FF)	Fionán Lynch (CnaG)	John O'Sullivan (CnaG)
8th	1933	Tom McEllistrim (FF)	Frederick Crowley (FF)	John Flynn (FF)	Denis Daly (FF)	Eamon Kissane (FF)	Fionán Lynch (CnaG)	John O'Sullivan (CnaG)
9th	1937	Constituency abolished. See Kerry North and Kerry South						

Dáil	Election	Deputy (Party)	Deputy (Party)	Deputy (Party)	Deputy (Party)	Deputy (Party)
32nd	2016	Martin Ferris (SF)	Michael Healy-Rae (Ind.)	Danny Healy-Rae (Ind.)	John Brassil (FF)	Brendan Griffin (FG)
33rd	2020	Pa Daly (SF)	Michael Healy-Rae (Ind.)	Danny Healy-Rae (Ind.)	Norma Foley (FF)	Brendan Griffin (FG)
34th	2024	Pa Daly (SF)	Michael Healy-Rae (Ind.)	Danny Healy-Rae (Ind.)	Norma Foley (FF)	Michael Cahill (FF)
