= Peter McDonald (MP) =

Irish businessman and politician

- Born: 1836; Kilfinane, County Limerick
- Died: 12 March 1891 (aged 54–55); Kingstown (Dún Laoghaire)
- Occupations: Teacher, businessman, politician

Peter McDonald (1836 – 12 March 1891) was an Irish teacher, businessman and politician.

Born in Kilfinane, County Limerick, the son of Randal McDonald, he became a teacher in Blackrock College, then a commercial traveller, and then a partner in Cantwell and McDonald, wine merchants and distillers of Dublin.

In the general election of 1885 he was elected member of parliament for North Sligo, a seat which he held until his death in 1891. He died at his home in Kingstown (Dún Laoghaire).

== Endnotes ==
Parliament of the United Kingdom
New constituency	Member of Parliament for North Sligo; 1885 – 1891	Succeeded by Bernard Collery
