= Charles Dolan (politician) =

Irish politician (1881–1963)

Charles Joseph Dolan (18 August 1881 – 8 June 1963) was an Irish politician and Member of Parliament (MP) for the Irish Parliamentary Party (IPP) in the House of Commons of the United Kingdom of Great Britain and Ireland for North Leitrim from 1906 to 1908.

Dolan was born in Manorhamilton, County Leitrim, the son of John Dolan, merchant, and Bridget Fitzpatrick.

He was first elected to parliament in the uncontested North Leitrim by-election in February 1906, caused by the resignation of P. A. McHugh, who had also been elected for neighbouring North Sligo.

Two years later, on 30 January 1908, Dolan resigned his seat by taking the Manor of Northstead in order to re-fight the constituency on behalf of Sinn Féin. In the resulting by-election, he was defeated by Francis Meehan, the IPP candidate.

After losing the by-election, Dolan emigrated to St. Louis, Missouri, then a center of shoe manufacture. He hoped to export that technology and set up a shoe factory in County Leitrim, but was not successful. He continued to agitate on behalf of an independent Ireland and against the entry of the United States into World War I.

Dolan's marriage to an Episcopalian in 1953 and entry into Freemasonry made him a pariah among the Irish community of St. Louis. He became a law professor and died in 1963, at Incarnate Word Hospital. He was survived by his wife, Gladys Stake Dolan.

His brother James Dolan was elected as a Sinn Féin TD at the 1918 general election for County Leitrim.

Parliament of the United Kingdom
Preceded by P. A. McHugh	Member of Parliament for North Leitrim; 1906 – 1908	Succeeded by Francis Meehan
