= North Leitrim =

Former parliamentary constituency in the United Kingdom

- Former county constituency for the House of Commons

1885–1918
- Seats: 1
- Created from: County Leitrim
- Replaced by: County Leitrim

North Leitrim was a parliamentary constituency in Ireland. From 1885 to 1918 it returned one Member of Parliament (MP) to the House of Commons of the United Kingdom of Great Britain and Ireland.

Prior to the 1885 United Kingdom general election and after the dissolution of Parliament in 1918 the area was part of the County Leitrim constituency.

== Boundaries ==
This constituency comprised the northern part of County Leitrim.

1885–1918: The baronies of Dromahair and Rosclogher, and that part of the barony of Leitrim contained within the parish of Kiltubbrid and the townlands of Acres, Aghagrania, Aghnagollop, Ardcolum, Barnameenagh, Barnameenagh West, Blackrock, Carrickbaun, Carricknabrack, Corlough, Corloughlin, Cormeeltan, Cormongan, Cornamuddagh, Cornashamsoge, Corrachuill, Corryard, Creenagh, Crey, Derrintober, Derrintonagh, Derryhallagh, Derrynaseer, Derryteigeroe, Dorrusawillin, Dristernaun, Drumcoora, Drumcroman, Drumderg, Drumhalwy, Drumduff, Drumshanbo, Greaghfarnagh, Greaghnaguillaun, Largan, Largan Mountain, Lavaur, Mahanagh, Moneynure, Murhaun, Roscunnish, Shancurry and Sheskinacurry in the parish of Kiltoghert.

== Members of Parliament ==
Election	Member	Party
1885	Michael Conway	Nationalist/Parnelite
1892	P. A. McHugh	Anti-Parnellite Nationalist
1906	Charles Dolan	Nationalist
1908	Francis Meehan	Irish Parliamentary Party
1918	Constituency abolished: see County Leitrim	

== Elections ==
=== Elections in the 1880s ===
1885 general election: North Leitrim
Party	Candidate	Votes	%	±%
Irish Parliamentary	Michael Conway	4,686	89.6	
Irish Conservative	George Loftus Tottenham	541	10.4	
Majority		4,145	79.2	
Turnout		5,227	80.6	
Registered electors		6,483		
Irish Parliamentary win (new seat)				

1886 general election: North Leitrim
Party	Candidate	Votes	%	±%
Irish Parliamentary	Michael Conway	Unopposed		
Registered electors		6,483		
Irish Parliamentary hold				

=== Elections in the 1890s ===
1892 general election: North Leitrim
Party	Candidate	Votes	%	±%
Irish National Federation	P. A. McHugh	4,502	87.5	N/A
Irish Unionist	Charles Gore Loftus Tottenham	645	12.5	New
Majority		3,857	75.0	N/A
Turnout		5,147	76.9	N/A
Registered electors		6,692		
Irish National Federation gain from Irish Parliamentary		Swing	N/A	

1895 general election: North Leitrim
Party	Candidate	Votes	%	±%
Irish National Federation	P. A. McHugh	Unopposed		
Registered electors		6,515		
Irish National Federation hold				

=== Elections in the 1900s ===
McHugh

1900 general election: North Leitrim
Party	Candidate	Votes	%	±%
Irish Parliamentary	P. A. McHugh	4,025	91.3	N/A
Irish Unionist	Charles James Singleton	383	8.7	New
Majority		3,642	82.6	N/A
Turnout		4,408	57.5	N/A
Registered electors		7,670		
Irish Parliamentary hold		Swing	N/A	

McHugh is unseated after being adjudicated bankrupt, but then wins the seat again at a by-election.

By-election, 1903: North Leitrim
Party	Candidate	Votes	%	±%
Irish Parliamentary	P. A. McHugh	Unopposed		
Registered electors		6,629		
Irish Parliamentary hold				

1906 general election: North Leitrim
Party	Candidate	Votes	%	±%
Irish Parliamentary	P. A. McHugh	Unopposed		
Registered electors		6,343		
Irish Parliamentary hold				

McHugh is also elected MP for North Sligo and opts to sit there, causing a by-election.

By-election, 1906: North Leitrim
Party	Candidate	Votes	%	±%
Irish Parliamentary	Charles Dolan	Unopposed		
Registered electors		6,343		
Irish Parliamentary hold				

Dolan resigns, causing a by-election, in which he stood again as a Sinn Féin candidate.

By-election, 1908: North Leitrim
Party	Candidate	Votes	%	±%
Irish Parliamentary	Francis Meehan	3,103	72.8	N/A
Sinn Féin	Charles Dolan	1,157	27.2	New
Majority		1,946	45.6	N/A
Turnout		4,260	68.8	N/A
Registered electors		6,192		
Irish Parliamentary hold		Swing	N/A	

=== Elections in the 1910s ===
January 1910 general election: North Leitrim
Party	Candidate	Votes	%	±%
Irish Parliamentary	Francis Meehan	Unopposed		
Registered electors		6,282		
Irish Parliamentary hold				

December 1910 general election: North Leitrim
Party	Candidate	Votes	%	±%
Irish Parliamentary	Francis Meehan	Unopposed		
Registered electors		6,282		
Irish Parliamentary hold				
