= 1914 Bolton by-election =

UK Parliamentary by-election

The 1914 Bolton by-election was held on 22 September 1914. The by-election was held due to the death of the incumbent Labour MP, Alfred Gill. It was won by the Labour candidate Robert Tootill who was unopposed due to a War-time electoral pact.
