= 1887 North East Cork by-election =

UK Parliamentary by-election

The 1887 North East Cork by-election was a parliamentary by-election held for the United Kingdom House of Commons constituency of North East Cork on 16 May 1887. The vacancy arose because of the resignation of the sitting member, Edmund Leamy of the Irish Parliamentary Party. In the ensuing by-election another Irish Parliamentary Party candidate, William O'Brien, former member for South Tyrone, was elected unopposed.
