= Robert Tootill =

British politician

Tootill, from his union's emblem

Robert Tootill CBE MP (22 October 1850 – 2 July 1934) was a British politician. He was a Labour Party Member of Parliament (MP) from 1914 to 1922 for the constituency of Bolton.

Born in Chorley, Tootill worked as a Labour Correspondent to the Board of Trade, and also served on Bolton Town Council for many years from 1888. He became secretary of Bolton Trades Council, and was also secretary of the Amalgamated Union of Machine and General Labourers.

He was elected in a by-election held on 22 September 1914 following the death of his predecessor Alfred Gill and held the seat in the 1918 general election. On the right wing of the Labour Party, he served as vice-president of the British Workers' League from 1916 to 1918.

He was invested as a Commander of the Order of the British Empire in the 1918 Birthday Honours for his work on the National War Aims Committee.

Parliament of the United Kingdom
Preceded by Alfred Gill; Thomas Taylor	Member of Parliament for Bolton; 1914 – 1922; With: Thomas Taylor to 1916; William Edge from 1916	Succeeded by William Russell; William Edge
