= 1908 North Leitrim by-election =

UK Parliamentary by-election

The 1908 North Leitrim by-election was held on 21 February 1908. The by-election was held due to the resignation of the incumbent Irish Parliamentary MP, Charles Dolan in order to re-fight the constituency on behalf of Sinn Féin. Dolan had quit the Parliamentary Party over dissatisfaction with its recent performance. The party for which he ran, Sinn Féin, was just over two years old and lacked any real financial power. Dolan lost to the Irish Parliamentary candidate Francis Meehan.

Sinn Féin ran their campaign from their office on Castle Street in Manorhamilton. Their Director of Elections was Seán Mac Diarmada of Corranmore, Kiltyclogher, who was later a signatory of the Proclamation of the Irish Republic and was executed as one of the leaders of the 1916 Rising.

== Result ==
North Leitrim by-election, 1908
Party	Candidate	Votes	%	±%
Irish Parliamentary	Francis Meehan	3,103	72.8	N/A
Sinn Féin	Charles Dolan	1,157	27.2	New
Majority		1,946	45.6	N/A
Turnout		4,260	68.5	N/A
Irish Parliamentary hold		Swing	N/A	
