= John O'Dowd (Sligo MP) =

Irish politician

John O'Dowd (13 February 1856 – 26 October 1937) was an Irish Nationalist Member of Parliament for North Sligo, March–September 1900, and for South Sligo, 1900–18.

== Life ==
He was born in Tubbercurry, Co. Sligo but emigrated to the US at an early age, returning in the later 1870s to Bunninadden, Sligo, where he was a farmer and lived for the rest of his life. He was connected with Irish political movements from 1880 onwards and in 1881-82 was imprisoned as a ‘suspect’ under the then coercion legislation.

He was a veteran of the Land League and active in the United Irish League. He was associated with the Irish Republican Brotherhood after his return from the US. For many years he was chairman of Sligo County Council and his son later became accountant to the Council.

He was elected unopposed to represent North Sligo on 7 March 1900 following the resignation of Bernard Collery, and transferred unopposed to his native South Sligo constituency at the general election later that year. He held this seat unopposed through successive general elections until December 1918, when he was defeated by the Sinn Féin candidate Alexander McCabe by 9,113 votes to 1,988. O’Dowd had made representations on McCabe's behalf when the latter had been tried, and acquitted, for possession of explosives. Maume (1999) states that O’Dowd was himself beaten up and severely injured by Sinn Féin supporters on polling day in 1918.

As a local authority representative, O’Dowd was a member of the Irish Convention of 1917–18, which unsuccessfully attempted to reconcile North and South Ireland.

He published a volume of poems, Lays of South Sligo, and contributed poems to T. D. Sullivan’s Weekly News.

== Publication ==
Lays of South Sligo: A Few Wild Flowers of National Poetry, Dublin, Gill, 1888; 2nd ed. 1889

== Notes ==
Parliament of the United Kingdom
Preceded by Bernard Collery	Member of Parliament for North Sligo; March 1900 – September 1900	Succeeded by William McKillop
Preceded by Thomas Curran	Member of Parliament for South Sligo; 1900 – 1918	Succeeded by Alexander McCabe
