= P. A. McHugh =

Irish politician

McHugh in 1904

Patrick Aloysius "P.A." McHugh (1858 – 30 May 1909), also spelt M’Hugh, was an Irish Nationalist politician. He sat in the House of Commons of the United Kingdom as the Member of Parliament for North Leitrim, from 1892 to 1906, and for North Sligo from 1906 until his death in 1909.

McHugh was born at Annagh, Glenfarne, County Leitrim. He was the son of a tenant farmer, Peter M’Hugh of Leitrim, and of Anne McDermott. He entered St Patrick's diocesan college, Cavan, a Catholic seminary, but left without taking orders. He went to Paris and engaged in journalism, and taught science and classics in the Athlone and Sligo Intermediate schools. In 1882 he married Mary Harte, daughter of a J. Harte of Sligo. She died in 1894. He became owner of The Sligo Champion in 1885. He was Mayor of Sligo in 1888, and again in 1895-98 and 1900. He was elected to Sligo County Council on its establishment in 1899 and became its first chairman.

He was elected MP for North Leitrim as an Anti-Parnellite Nationalist in 1892, winning comfortably over the Unionist candidate with 87% of the vote. He retained the seat unopposed in 1895. At this election he also challenged the Parnellite Willie Redmond in East Clare, losing by only 57 votes in a poll of over 6,500. In 1900, standing for the reunited Irish Parliamentary Party, he was again challenged in North Leitrim by a Unionist, but again won comfortably, with 91% of the vote. In April 1901 he was imprisoned for six months following a conviction for ‘seditious libel’ on account of an article on Jury Packing in Sligo published in his newspaper. The article had attacked jurymen who had convicted two men of intimidating persons who rented farms from which the former owners had been evicted. On his release, he was given a celebratory lunch by the Lord Mayor of Dublin. In September the following year, he stood before the Irish Court of Bankruptcy after a petition from the Crown Solicitor for Sligo, but this apparently did not affect his political standing. There were rumours he would step down in early 1903, but in 1906 he was returned unopposed both for North Leitrim and for North Sligo, and chose to sit for the latter constituency, which he represented until his death in 1909.

A monument erected to him outside the main post office was moved to the front of Sligo Town Hall in the 1970s; 2007 plans to move it again during roadworks were opposed by the council.

== Notes ==
Parliament of the United Kingdom
Preceded by Michael Conway	Member of Parliament for North Leitrim; 1892–1906	Succeeded by Charles Dolan
Preceded by William McKillop	Member of Parliament for North Sligo; 1906–1909	Succeeded by Thomas Scanlan
