= Thomas Scanlan =

Irish barrister and nationalist politician (1874–1930)

Thomas Scanlan (21 May 1874 – 9 January 1930) was an Irish barrister and nationalist politician. He was Member of Parliament (MP) for North Sligo from 1909 to 1918, as a member of the Irish Parliamentary Party in the House of Commons of the United Kingdom.

== Early life ==
Son of Thomas Scanlan, a farmer, he was born at Drumcliffe, County Sligo, and educated at Summerhill College in Sligo and at the University of St Andrews, Scotland. In 1905 he married Mary Helen Mullen of Glasgow, daughter of John Mullen.

He began his career as a journalist on the Glasgow Observer. Later he became a solicitor and eventually was called to the English Bar and became prominently identified with the Irish movement in London.

== Political career ==
Scanlan was elected unopposed for North Sligo at a by-election in August 1909 after the death of P. A. McHugh MP. and was unopposed in the January and December 1910 general elections. At one time he served as a secretary of the Irish Parliamentary Party. In 1918 he lost his seat to J. J. Clancy of Sinn Féin, by a margin of more than two to one.

Scanlan introduced the Sligo Corporation Act 1918 to use the single transferable vote (STV) for elections to Sligo Corporation, and to enhance the corporation's power to set rates. STV had been introduced in university constituencies by the Representation of the People Act 1918, and was envisaged for the Home Rule assembly of the Government of Ireland Act 1914 which never came into force. STV's success in Sligo saw it extended to all Ireland for the 1920 local elections.

== Legal career ==
As a barrister, Scanlan represented the National Sailors' and Firemen's Union at the inquiry into the sinking of the Titanic in 1912. In the event the government paid the Union's costs, and on this account Scanlan was criticised in some quarters for accepting a government brief, although he had accepted the brief before he knew that the government would pay. He was also criticised for living in England. After his parliamentary defeat he was a London Metropolitan Police Magistrate from 1924 to 1927. One of his court clerks, F. T. Giles, noted that he was a good magistrate; he was sympathetic to the litigants in his court, and he had conscientiously studied the law. However, "today he would have been recognised as an alcoholic"; he would have bouts of heavy drinking every few months which made him difficult to work with and occasionally fail to appear in court. After a complaint to the Home Secretary by Caroline Ganley, a fellow magistrate, and his being hospitalised, he was made to resign.

During his career he was a close friend of T. P. O'Connor, acting as a pall-bearer at the latter's funeral in 1929.

== Sources ==
- Dod's Parliamentary Companion 1912
- Irish Independent, 10 January 1930
- Patrick Maume, The Long Gestation: Irish Nationalist Life 1891–1918, New York, St Martin's Press, 1999
- Cornelius O'Leary, Irish Elections 1918-1977: Parties, Voters and Proportional Representation, Dublin, Gill & MacMillan, 1979
- Walker, Brian M., ed. (1978). Parliamentary election results in Ireland 1801–1922. Dublin: Royal Irish Academy. ISBN 0-901714-12-7.
- Who Was Who, 1929–1940

Parliament of the United Kingdom
Preceded by P. A. McHugh	Member of Parliament for North Sligo; 1909–1918	Succeeded by J. J. Clancy
