= George Harwood =

British politician

Member of Parliament for Bolton
- In office 1895 – 1912 (his death)
- Preceded by: Francis Bridgeman
- Succeeded by: Thomas Taylor

Personal details
- Born: 14 September 1845 Lancashire
- Died: 7 November 1912 (aged 67)
- Party: Liberal Party
- Spouse(s): Alice Marsh (m. 1868; died 1894) Ellen Hopkinson (m. 1904)
- Education: Owens College; University of London

Religious life
- Denomination: Anglicanism
- Ordination: 1886 (Deacon) by James Moorhouse

George Manus Harwood I (14 September 1845 – 7 November 1912) was a British businessman and Liberal Party politician. He was born the second son of Richard Harwood who founded a firm of cotton spinners and who was at one time Mayor of Bolton and twice Mayor of Salford.

== Education ==
George Harwood went to school locally in Lancashire and then entered his father's cotton business while still finding time to continue his education at Owens College, the establishment founded with a bequest left by John Owens, a successful Manchester cotton merchant and first set up in a house in Deansgate, Manchester, once occupied by Richard Cobden. Owens College developed into the Victoria University of Manchester, which later combined with UMIST to become the University of Manchester.

== Religion ==
Harwood loved learning and, while still running a cotton mill as his main source of income, (he eventually became chairman of Richard Harwood & Son, Ltd, cotton spinners, Bolton) devoted himself to studying the classics and political economy, eventually gaining an MA degree from the University of London. He declined an offer of a professorship of political economy in South Australia to begin a study of theology and combined with others, including Dean Stanley, to found the Church Reform Union which attempted to introduce democratic principles into the Church of England by giving every member of a congregation a share in the government and finance of the church; it also aimed to unite the various denominations of Protestantism. Harwood was active in the British and Foreign Bible Society. Ordained a deacon of the Anglican Church in 1886 by James Moorhouse, Bishop of Manchester, he preached regularly across the north of England over the next two years as well as acting as curate of St Ann's Church, Manchester.

== Law ==
Worried that the cotton business might not continue to prosper, Harwood studied law to provide an alternative profession. He read for the Bar and was called to Lincoln's Inn in 1890. Around this time he and his family moved to London, where Harwood began work as a barrister, although he still travelled often to the north to look after his cotton interests.

== Politics ==
At the general election of 1895 he stood as the Liberal candidate in Bolton, a two-member seat which had been held by the Conservatives for ten years. Harwood took the second seat from the Unionists and held it until his death. The Liberals won the resulting by-election. In Parliament he took a keen interest in issues to do with the Church and licensing but he was also concerned with working conditions, being a principal supporter of a Bill for the early Saturday closing of textile factories, although this also had to do with the slowing down of the cotton trade. At one time he was treasurer of the National Society for the Prevention of Consumption. During the Boer War, Harwood was a founder member of the Telescope Fund committee which aimed to raise money to provide telescopes to improve the effectiveness of the British Army in South Africa. He published a number of books on theology and politics.

== Family ==
In 1868 he married Alice Marsh of Wigan and they had two sons and a daughter. Alice died in 1894 and Harwood was remarried in 1904 to Ellen Hopkinson, daughter of Alfred Hopkinson, Vice Chancellor of Manchester University.

- One of Harwood's sons was Harold Marsh Harwood (1874–1959) who followed him into the family cotton business but was also a playwright and theatre manager.
- A daughter Margaret Harwood married in 1902 Frederick Kincaid Etlinger.
- Another daughter Georgina Harwood (1905–2006) married Christopher Francis Battiscombe, OBE, FSA, Lt-Col. of the Grenadier Guards. She was the biographer of Queen Alexandra, John Keble, Mrs Gladstone, Christina Rossetti, Elizabeth Wordsworth and the Spencers of Althorp.

After his death at his Knightsbridge home at South Audley St, George Harwood was buried at West Norwood Cemetery.

Parliament of the United Kingdom
Preceded by Francis Bridgeman; Herbert Shepherd-Cross	Member of Parliament for Bolton; 1895–1912; With: Herbert Shepherd-Cross 1895–1906; Alfred Henry Gill 1906–1912	Succeeded by Alfred Henry Gill; Thomas Taylor
