= Francis Meehan =

Irish nationalist politician (1864–1946)

Francis Edward Meehan MBE (1864 – 22 December 1946) was an Irish nationalist politician and Member of Parliament (MP) in the House of Commons of the United Kingdom of Great Britain and Ireland.

He was first elected as the Irish Parliamentary Party MP for the North Leitrim constituency at the North Leitrim by-election on 21 February 1908, and was again re-elected at the January 1910 and December 1910 general elections. He continued in the constituency until its abolition in 1918, and he was subsequently awarded a member of the Order of the British Empire in 1920.

His cousin Patrick Meehan was also an MP.

Parliament of the United Kingdom
Preceded by Charles Dolan	Member of Parliament for North Leitrim; 1908 – 1918	Constituency abolished
