= John Stack (politician) =

Irish nationalist politician

John Stack (1845 – 5 March 1897) was an Irish nationalist politician, and Member of Parliament (MP) for North Kerry from 1885 to 1892.

At the 1885 general election, Stack was elected unopposed as Irish Parliamentary Party MP for the newly created North Kerry constituency; it was the only one of the four Kerry constituencies not be contested by a Conservative or Loyalist candidate. He was returned unopposed in 1886, and when the Irish Party split in 1891, he sided with the Anti-Parnellite majority, joining the Irish National Federation. Stack did not contest the 1892 general election, when the Anti-Parnellite Thomas Sexton won the seat with a large majority over a Parnellite candidate.

Parliament of the United Kingdom
New constituency	Member of Parliament for North Kerry; 1885 – 1892	Succeeded by Thomas Sexton
