= North Kerry (UK Parliament constituency) =

UK parliamentary constituency in Ireland, 1885–1922

- Former county constituency for the House of Commons

1885–1922
- Seats: 1
- Created from: County Kerry
- Replaced by: Kerry–Limerick West

North Kerry was a parliamentary constituency in Ireland, which returned one Member of Parliament (MP) to the House of Commons of the Parliament of the United Kingdom, elected on a system of first-past-the-post, from 1885 to 1922.

Representation at Westminster in this constituency ceased at the 1922 United Kingdom general election, which took place on 15 November, shortly before the establishment of the Irish Free State on 6 December 1922.

== Boundaries ==
This constituency comprised the northern part of County Kerry.

1885–1922: The baronies of Clanmaurice and Iraghticonnor.

== Members of Parliament ==
Election	Member	Party
1885	John Stack	Irish Parliamentary Party
1891	John Stack	Irish National Federation
1892	Thomas Sexton	Irish National Federation
1896 by-election	Michael Joseph Flavin	Irish National Federation
1900	Michael Joseph Flavin	Irish Parliamentary Party
1918	James Crowley	Sinn Féin
1922	constituency abolished	

== Elections ==
=== Elections in the 1880s ===
1885 general election: North Kerry
Party	Candidate	Votes	%	±%
Irish Parliamentary	John Stack	Unopposed		
Irish Parliamentary win (new seat)				

1886 general election: North Kerry
Party	Candidate	Votes	%	±%
Irish Parliamentary	John Stack	Unopposed		
Irish Parliamentary hold				

=== Elections in the 1890s ===
1892 general election: North Kerry
Party	Candidate	Votes	%	±%
Irish National Federation	Thomas Sexton	2,858	78.6	N/A
Irish National League	Edmund Haviland-Burke	776	21.4	N/A
Majority		2,082	57.2	N/A
Turnout		3,634	62.1	N/A
Registered electors		5,855		
Irish National Federation gain from Irish Parliamentary		Swing	N/A	

1895 general election: North Kerry
Party	Candidate	Votes	%	±%
Irish National Federation	Thomas Sexton	Unopposed		
Irish National Federation hold				

By-election, 1896: North Kerry
Party	Candidate	Votes	%	±%
Irish National Federation	Michael Joseph Flavin	Unopposed		
Irish National Federation hold				

=== Elections in the 1900s ===
1900 general election: North Kerry
Party	Candidate	Votes	%	±%
Irish Parliamentary	Michael Joseph Flavin	Unopposed		
Irish Parliamentary hold				

1906 general election: North Kerry
Party	Candidate	Votes	%	±%
Irish Parliamentary	Michael Joseph Flavin	Unopposed		
Irish Parliamentary hold				

=== Elections in the 1910s ===
January 1910 general election: North Kerry
Party	Candidate	Votes	%	±%
Irish Parliamentary	Michael Joseph Flavin	2,637	74.9	N/A
Ind. Nationalist	Thomas Neville Stack	885	25.1	New
Majority		1,752	49.8	N/A
Turnout		3,522	63.7	N/A
Registered electors		5,536		
Irish Parliamentary hold		Swing	N/A	

December 1910 general election: North Kerry
Party	Candidate	Votes	%	±%
Irish Parliamentary	Michael Joseph Flavin	Unopposed		
Irish Parliamentary hold				

1918 general election: North Kerry
Party	Candidate	Votes	%	±%
Sinn Féin	James Crowley	Unopposed		
Sinn Féin gain from Irish Parliamentary				
