= 1891 North Sligo by-election =

UK parliamentary by-election

The 1891 North Sligo by-election was a parliamentary by-election held for the United Kingdom House of Commons constituency of North Sligo on 2 April 1891. It arose as a result of the death of the sitting member, Peter McDonald of the Irish Parliamentary Party.

== Background ==
In the period before the by-election, the Irish Parliamentary Party had been undergoing a serious crisis. Its leader, Charles Stewart Parnell, had been cited as co-respondent in a divorce case, which he had not contested, causing a scandal. A majority of the party's MPs left to form the Irish National Federation, a new Anti-Parnellite group. The remainder stayed within the Irish National League led by Parnell. The contest at North Sligo was the second of three by-elections which followed the split and gave the voters an opportunity to express their views of the two sides - as Callanan puts it, "a staggered plebiscite on [Parnell's] leadership".

== Campaign ==
Two candidates were nominated: Bernard Collery for the Irish National Federation, and Valentine Blake Dillon for the Irish National League.

The Anti-Parnellite campaign was managed by Maurice Healy and David Sheehy. Clerical opposition to Parnell was strong, with two of the bishops whose dioceses covered parts of the constituency taking a firm anti-Parnell line. But in Tireragh, in the west around the part of Ballina in County Sligo, Parnellite support was strong and the Bishop of Killala, whose diocese included the town, took a neutral line and allowed local priests to canvass for Parnell.

== Result ==
Like the 1890 North Kilkenny by-election, the result was a triumphant success for the Anti-Parnellites. Collery won 3,261 votes, as opposed to 2,493 for Dillon - a majority of 768. While this was clearly another setback for the Parnellites, they gained a larger proportion of the vote (43%) than they had in North Kilkenny (35%).

1891 North Sligo by-election
Party	Candidate	Votes	%	±%
Irish National Federation	Bernard Collery	3,261	56.7	N/A
Irish National League	Valentine Blake Dillon	2,493	43.3	N/A
Majority		768	13.4	N/A
Turnout		5,754	67.9	N/A
Registered electors		8,476		
Irish National Federation gain from Irish Parliamentary		Swing	N/A	
