= Thomas Sexton (Irish politician) =

Irish journalist, financial expert, nationalist politician and Member of Parliament

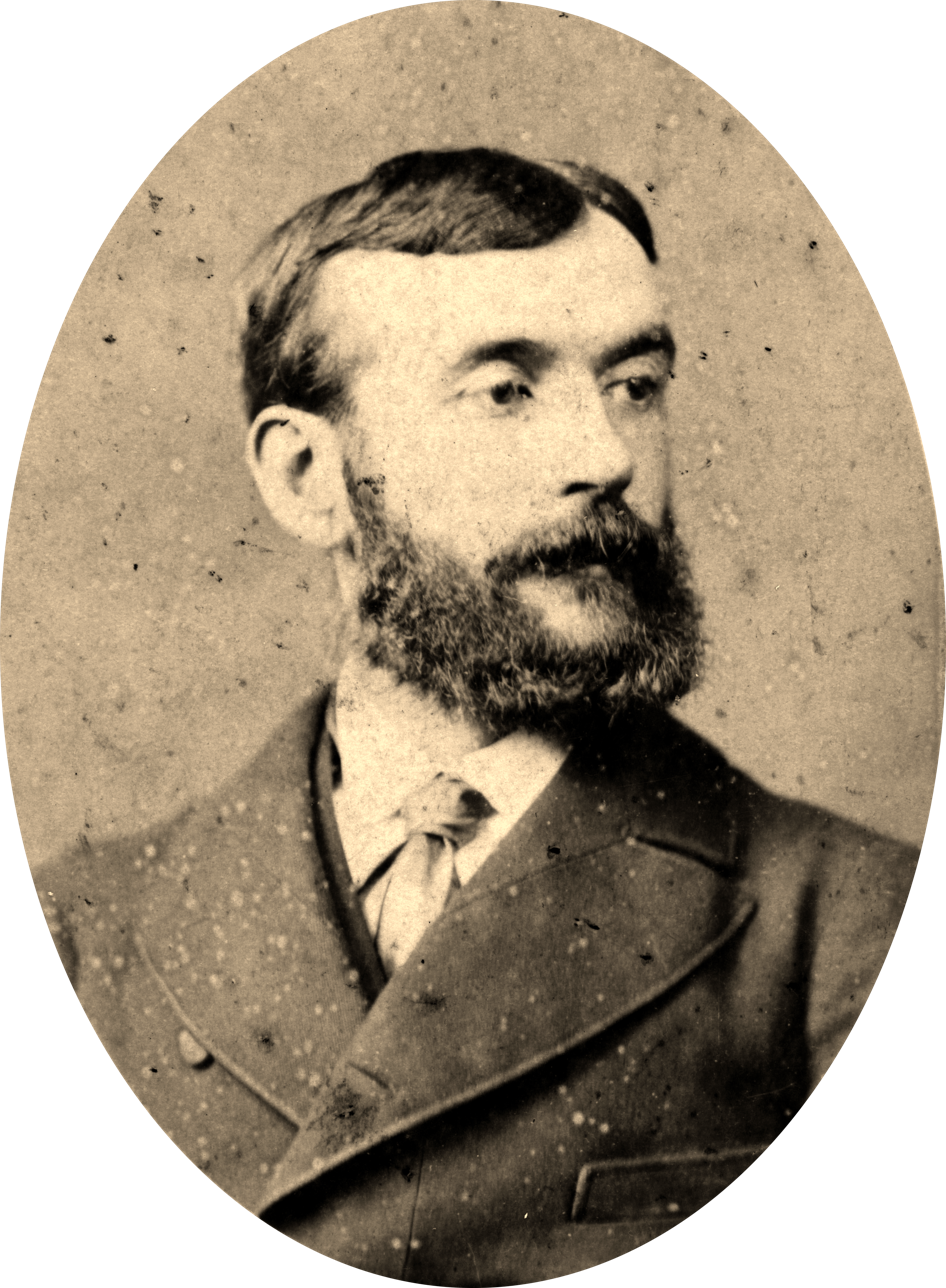
- Sexton, c. 1880s

Member of Parliament
- In office 1880–1885
- Preceded by: Denis Maurice O'Conor and Edward King-Harman
- Succeeded by: Constituency divided
- Constituency: County Sligo
- In office 1885–1886
- Preceded by: New Constituency
- Succeeded by: Edward Joseph Kennedy
- Constituency: South Sligo
- In office 1886–1892
- Preceded by: James Horner Haslett
- Succeeded by: H. O. Arnold-Forster
- Constituency: Belfast West
- In office 1892–1896
- Preceded by: John Stack
- Succeeded by: Michael Joseph Flavin
- Constituency: North Kerry

Lord Mayor of Dublin
- In office 1888–1890
- Preceded by: Timothy Daniel Sullivan
- Succeeded by: Edward Joseph Kennedy

Personal details
- Born: 1848 Ballygannon, County Waterford, Ireland
- Died: 1932 (aged 83–84)
- Party: Irish Parliamentary Party (until 1891); Irish National Federation (1891 to 1896)

Thomas Sexton (1848–1932) was an Irish journalist, financial expert, nationalist politician and Member of Parliament (MP) in the House of Commons of the United Kingdom of Great Britain and Ireland from 1880 to 1896, representing four different constituencies. He was High Sheriff of County Dublin in 1887 and Lord Mayor of Dublin from 1888 to 1890. Sexton was a high ranking member of the Irish Parliamentary Party, raised up by Charles Stewart Parnell himself. However, Sexton broke with Parnell and joined the Anti-Parnellites in 1891 following Parnell's marriage scandal. Sexton was disheartened by the subsequent infighting amongst the Anti-Parnellites and pulled back from politics. He thereafter became the chairman of the Freeman's Journal, one of the largest newspapers in Ireland.

== Early life ==
Sexton was born at Ballygannon, County Waterford, where he attended the local CBS school. Aged 12 he was the chosen from amongst several applicants to a position of clerk with the Waterford and Limerick Railway where he remained until 1867. Sexton took work from the Waterford News and other local papers; as well as forming a debating society. Moving to Dublin he joined The Nation newspaper becoming its leader-writer. In 1879 Sexton joined the Irish National Land League movement, and he became a member of the Parnellite Irish Parliamentary Party.

== Career ==
After being encouraged to run by Charles Stuart Parnell, Sexton was first elected MP for County Sligo in the 1880 general election, for South Sligo in the 1885 general election, then for Belfast West in the 1886 election and for North Kerry in the 1892 election. During his time as an MP, he was considered one of Parnell's principal lieutenants.

He was a cosigner of the No Rent Manifesto issued in 1881. He was regarded as one of the finest orators of the Irish Party, but handicapped by a querulous temperament. He was noted for once having spoken for 3 hours straight during an attempt by the Irish Parliamentary Party to block the government from introducing the Coercion Act.

In October 1881 Sexton was amongst those Irish Parliamentary Party MPs who were arrested and imprisoned alongside Parnell for "sabotaging the Land Act" through their activism with the Irish Land League. Following his early release on the grounds of ill health, Sexton was amongst those who signed the No Rent Manifesto, which called for a nationwide rent strike in Ireland intended to break the Land Law (Ireland) Act 1881.

Sexton's victory in Belfast West in 1886 was considered an upset victory, with Joseph Devlin and his organisational skills being credited by some as the lynchpin behind it.

Sexton's speech on the second reading of the first home rule bill has been called Sexton's greatest triumph, with William Gladstone describing it as "the most eloquent he had heard in a generation."

In December 1887 Sexton received the freedom of Dublin.

Sexton was a member of Dublin Corporation between 1886 and 1892, and during that time he became Lord Mayor of Dublin between 1888 and 1890. During that reign, Sexton arranged a highly beneficial restructuring of the municipal debt.

=== Anti-Parnellite ===
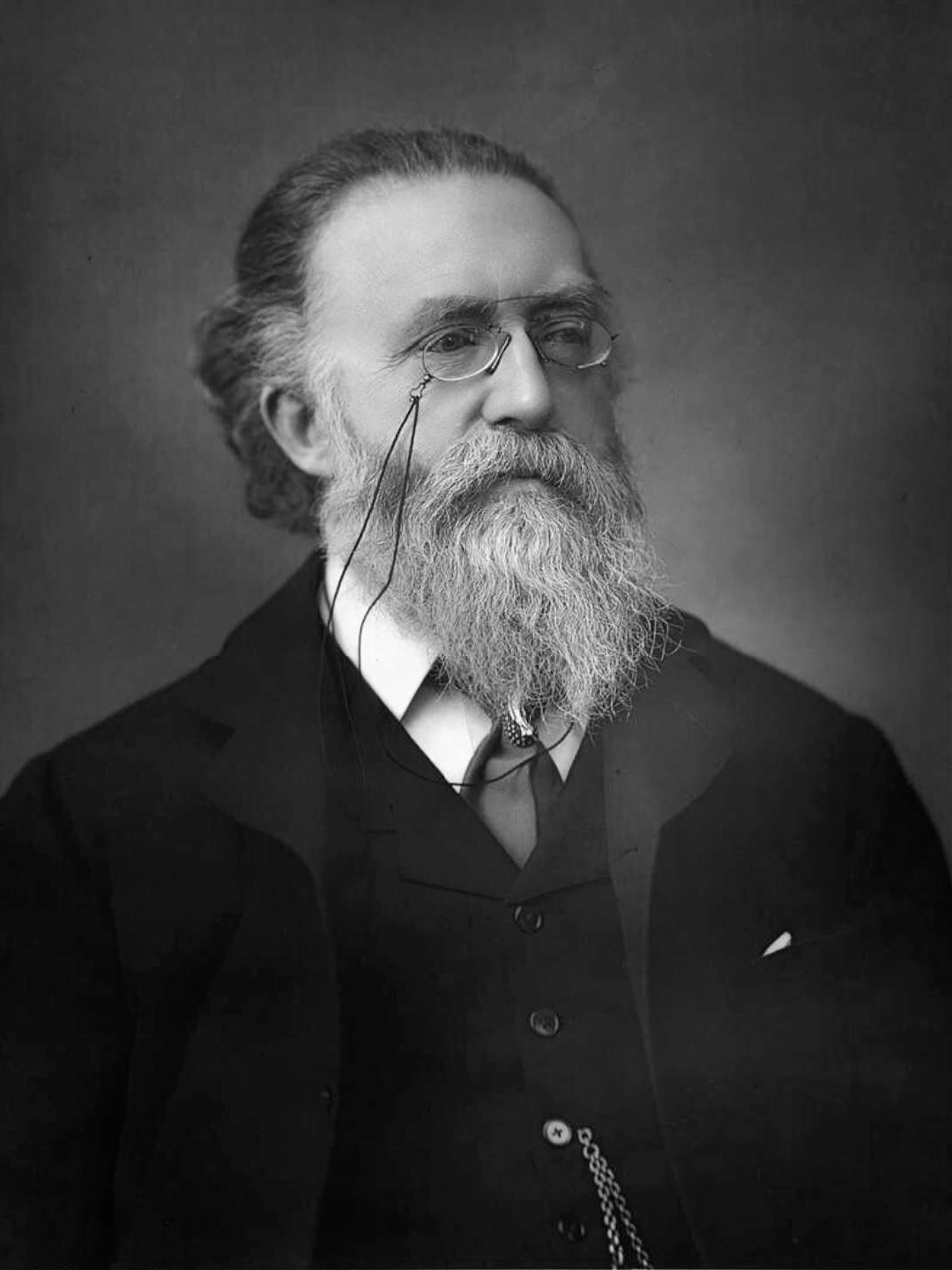
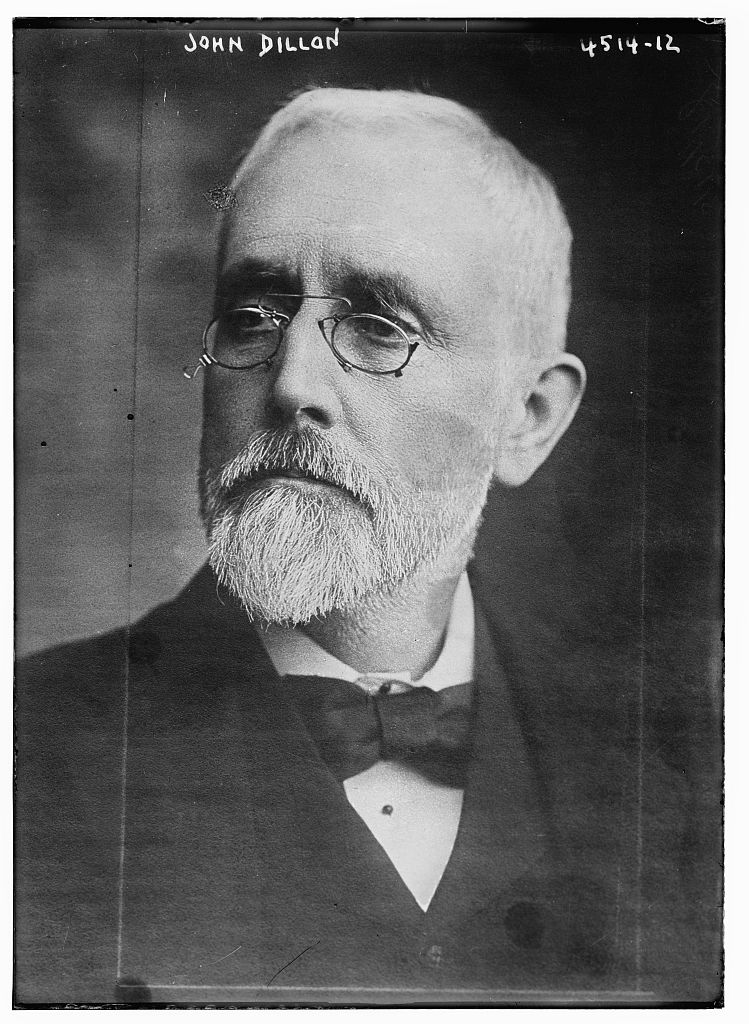
Sexton joined the likes of Justin McCarthy and John Dillon in the Anti-Parnell Irish National Federation party

Following the party split over Parnell's leadership, Sexton sided with John Dillon's anti-Parnellite faction. Sexton felt that Parnell had to step aside in order for the Irish to maintain their political alliance with William Gladstone's Liberal party, however, Parnell refused to do so. Sexton also came to write for the Anti-Parnellite paper the National Press, launched in March 1891. The National Press merged with the more well-known Freeman's Journal in March 1892 and Sexton served as the chairman of the newly merged board.

Sexton lost his seat in Belfast West in 1892 but won another seat in North Kerry in the same election. During this final run as an MP, Sexton was struck by the callousness of the in-fighting in the Irish National Federation between one faction supporting John Dillon and one supporting T. M. Healy. Sexton tried to remain above the disputes. In 1896, following the resignation of Justin McCarthy as leader of the Irish National Federation, Sexton was offered the role but instead not only opted to decline, but he also retired from parliamentary politics, disgusted at the bitter factionalism following the failure of the second Home Rule bill.

Sexton seemed to come to regret this decision and thereafter tried to use his role as Chairman of the Freeman's Journal to influence his former colleagues, leading Dillon to complain about Sexton in 1899. Sexton continued to be an issue following the reunification of the Irish Parliamentary Party under John Redmond in 1900. By 1903, Sexton's Freeman's Journal was staunchly critical of the party, particularly over the issue of a land purchase scheme introduced by George Wyndham. Sexton criticised the scheme as both too generous to landlords but also for seeming, to him, to have the objective of "killing home rule with kindness". After Wyndham's Land Act came into law, John Dillon joined Sexton in rejecting the policy of seeking further areas of ‘conciliation’ between the IPP and the landlords. "Conciliation" had been seen by William O'Brien, who negotiated the scheme, and others as the basis for future progress. Redmond, while sympathetic to ‘conciliation’, refused to dissociate himself from the views of Dillon, Sexton and the Freeman. Dillon would not risk splitting the party again and so the policy of ‘conciliation’ was effectively at a dead end, put down largely thanks to Sexton and the Freeman.

Sexton was a member of the Committee, chaired by Hugh Childers, to enquire into the financial relations between Great Britain and Ireland. In the report of the committee, published in 1896, he wrote a minority report showing that the tax burden on Ireland had been steadily increased throughout the nineteenth century, at the same time as its people were steadily impoverished.

He was hostile to the Land Purchase (Ireland) Act 1903 on financial grounds, and regarded by William O'Brien as one of the principal players involved in his subsequent marginalisations from the Irish Party. Sexton continued to be a leading ally of Dillon as chairman of the board of the Freeman's Journal from 1893 to 1911; however, his policy of cutting investments to maintain dividends led to the demise of the paper through William Martin Murphy's Irish Independent.

During Sexton's time as chairman of the Freeman's Journal, the paper began to suffer financially, struggling with competition from the National Press and from 1891 onwards, the pro-Parnall Irish Daily Independent. In the face of this competition, the Journal found it difficult to attract new investment and Sexton was unwilling to sell his shares in the paper for fear of losing control over it. In 1900 the Irish Daily Independent was purchased by William Martin Murphy and in 1905 transformed it into the Irish Independent, which sold at half the price of the Freeman's Journal and in a more popular format. The Freeman was unable to offer a response and began losing money. Sexton continued to try and hold on, but eventually the leadership of the Irish Parliamentary Party stepped in and forced his resignation. The paper had to be subsidised by the party in the following years until it was shut down in 1918 following the Irish Parliamentary Party's catastrophic loss to Sinn Féin in the 1918 Irish general election.

== Later life ==
After retiring from the Freeman's Journal he became Chairman of Boland's Mill, and during World War I denounced wartime taxation and in 1918 endorsed Sinn Féin. At the end of his career he supported Fianna Fáil because it promised tariff protection for flour-milling.

Parliament of the United Kingdom
| Preceded by Denis Maurice O'Conor; Edward King-Harman | Member of Parliament for County Sligo; 1880–1885; With: Denis Maurice O'Conor, to 1883; Nicholas Lynch, from 1883 | Constituency divided |
| New constituency | Member of Parliament for South Sligo; 1885–1886 | Succeeded by Edward Joseph Kennedy |
| Preceded by James Horner Haslett | Member of Parliament for Belfast West; 1886–1892 | Succeeded by H. O. Arnold-Forster |
| Preceded by John Stack | Member of Parliament for North Kerry; 1892–1896 | Succeeded by Michael Joseph Flavin |
Civic offices
| Preceded by Timothy Daniel Sullivan | Lord Mayor of Dublin; 1888–1890 | Succeeded by Edward Joseph Kennedy |
