= Alfred Henry Gill =

English Labour Member of Parliament

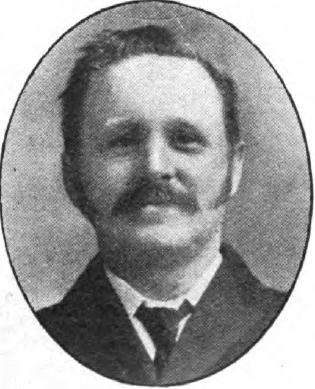
- Gill in the mid 1900s

Deputy Leader of the Labour Party
- In office 9 February 1914 – 27 August 1914
- Leader: Ramsay MacDonald; Arthur Henderson
- Preceded by: James Parker
- Succeeded by: John Hodge

Member of Parliament for Bolton
- In office 8 February 1906 – 27 August 1914
- Preceded by: Herbert Shepherd-Cross
- Succeeded by: Robert Tootill

Personal details
- Born: Alfred Henry Gill; 3 December 1856 Rochdale, Lancashire, UK
- Died: 27 August 1914 (aged 57)
- Party: Labour
- Spouse: Sarah Ellen Greenwood
- Children: 5
- Parents: John Gill (father); Mary Stott (mother)
- Education: St. Mary's Elementary School

Alfred Henry Gill (3 December 1856 – 27 August 1914) was an English Labour Member of Parliament for Bolton.

== Early life and career ==
He was born in Rochdale, the son of John and Mary (née Stott) Gill, and educated at St. Mary's Elementary School, Balderstone. He started work in a cotton mill at the age of 10, became an active campaigner for workers' rights and rose to be General Secretary of the Bolton Operative Spinners Association, a locally important trade union. He also served as a Justice of the Peace (JP) for Bolton from 1899.

== Political career ==
In 1906 he entered Parliament as the junior MP for Bolton, one of the 29 original members of the Parliamentary Labour Party. Their victories in the polls were made possible by a deal with the Liberal Party, whereby the Liberals would give up selected seats and support the Labour candidate instead. He subsequently held the seat, latterly as the senior MP, until his death from anaemia in 1914. Throughout his time in Parliament he fought for better health and safety in the workplace. At the time of his death he was vice-chairman of the Parliamentary Labour Party.

== Personal life and death ==
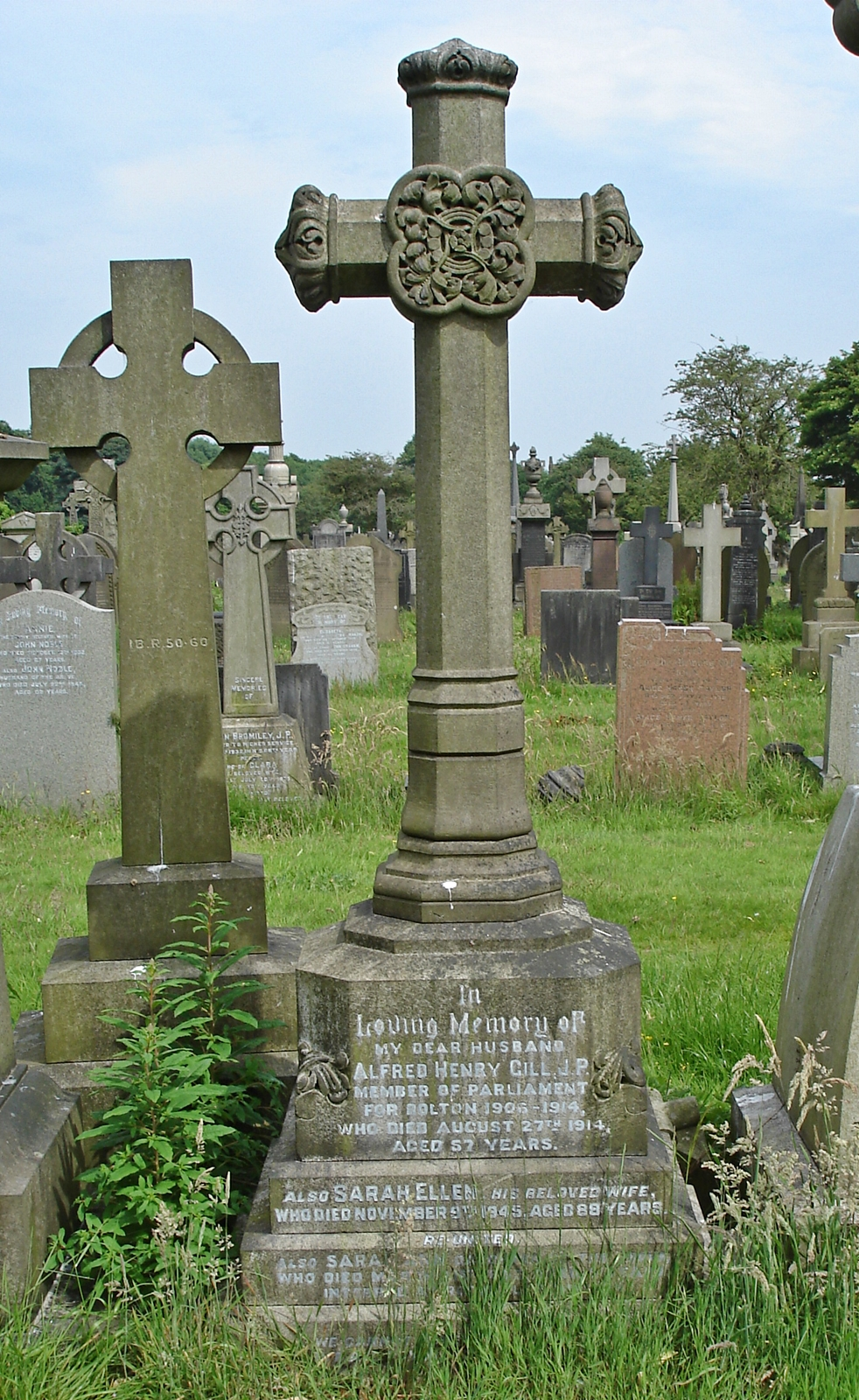
Grave of Alfred Gill, Heaton Cemetery, Bolton

He married Sarah Ellen Greenwood in Rochdale and had a son and four daughters.

He died in 1914 and is buried in Heaton Cemetery, Bolton.

Parliament of the United Kingdom
Preceded by Herbert Shepherd-Cross; George Harwood	Member of Parliament for Bolton; 1906–1914; With: George Harwood 1906–1912; Thomas Taylor 1912–1914	Succeeded by Robert Tootill; Thomas Taylor
Trade union offices
Preceded by ?	General Secretary of the Bolton and District Operative Cotton Spinners' Provincial Association; 1896–1914	Succeeded by Peter Bullough
Preceded by D. C. Cummings	President of the Trades Union Congress; 1907	Succeeded by David Shackleton
Preceded by Herbert Skinner and John Wadsworth	Trades Union Congress representative to the American Federation of Labour; 1909; With: J. R. Clynes	Succeeded by William Brace and Ben Turner
