= North Sligo =

Former parliamentary constituency in the United Kingdom

- Former county constituency for the House of Commons

1885–1922
- Seats: 1
- Created from: County Sligo
- Replaced by: Sligo–Mayo East

North Sligo was a parliamentary constituency in Ireland, which returned one Member of Parliament (MP) to the House of Commons of the Parliament of the United Kingdom, elected on a system of first-past-the-post, from 1885 to 1922.

Prior to the 1885 general election the area was part of the two-seat County Sligo constituency. From 1922, on the establishment of the Irish Free State, it was not represented in the UK Parliament.

== Boundaries ==
This constituency comprised the northern part of County Sligo.

1885–1922: The baronies of Carbury and Tireragh, and that part of the barony of Leyny contained within the parishes of Ballysadare and Killoran.

== Members of Parliament ==
Election	Member	Party
1885	Peter McDonald	Irish Parliamentary Party
1891	Bernard Collery	Irish National Federation (Anti-Parnellite)
1900 by-election	John O'Dowd	Irish Parliamentary Party
1900	William McKillop	Irish Parliamentary Party
1906	P. A. McHugh	Irish Parliamentary Party
1909 by-election	Thomas Scanlan	Irish Parliamentary Party
1918	J. J. Clancy	Sinn Féin
1922, October 26	UK constituency abolished	

== Elections ==
=== Elections in the 1880s ===
General election 1 December 1885: North Sligo
Party	Candidate	Votes	%	±%
Irish Parliamentary	Peter McDonald	5,216	87.1	
Irish Conservative	John ffolliott	772	12.9	
Majority		4,444	74.2	
Turnout		5,988	76.1	
Registered electors		7,869		
Irish Parliamentary win (new seat)				

General election 3 July 1886: North Sligo
Party	Candidate	Votes	%	±%
Irish Parliamentary	Peter McDonald	Unopposed		
Registered electors		7,869		
Irish Parliamentary hold				

=== Elections in the 1890s ===
McDonald dies, prompting a by-election.

By-election 2 April 1891: North Sligo
Party	Candidate	Votes	%	±%
Irish National Federation	Bernard Collery	3,261	56.7	N/A
Irish National League	Valentine Blake Dillon	2,493	43.3	N/A
Majority		768	13.4	N/A
Turnout		5,754	67.9	N/A
Registered electors		8,476		
Irish National Federation gain from Irish Parliamentary		Swing	N/A	

General election 14 July 1892: North Sligo
Party	Candidate	Votes	%	±%
Irish National Federation	Bernard Collery	4,262	81.6	N/A
Irish Unionist	Owen Wynne	958	18.4	New
Majority		3,304	63.2	N/A
Turnout		5,220	58.1	N/A
Registered electors		8,992		
Irish National Federation gain from Irish Parliamentary		Swing	N/A	

General election 23 July 1895: North Sligo
Party	Candidate	Votes	%	±%
Irish National Federation	Bernard Collery	3,274	61.5	−20.1
Irish National League	Henry Harrison	1,281	24.0	N/A
Irish Unionist	Malby Crofton	772	14.5	−3.9
Majority		1,993	37.5	−25.7
Turnout		5,327	68.6	+10.5
Registered electors		7,764		
Irish National Federation hold		Swing	−8.1	

=== Elections in the 1900s ===
Collery resigns, causing a by-election.

By-election 7 March 1900: North Sligo
Party	Candidate	Votes	%	±%
Irish Parliamentary	John O'Dowd	Unopposed		
Registered electors		8,629		
Irish Parliamentary hold				

General election 4 October 1900: North Sligo
Party	Candidate	Votes	%	±%
Irish Parliamentary	William McKillop	Unopposed		
Registered electors		8,629		
Irish Parliamentary hold				

McHugh

General election 16 January 1906: North Sligo
Party	Candidate	Votes	%	±%
Irish Parliamentary	P. A. McHugh	Unopposed		
Registered electors		8,350		
Irish Parliamentary hold				

McHugh dies, causing a by-election.

By-election 5 August 1909: North Sligo
Party	Candidate	Votes	%	±%
Irish Parliamentary	Thomas Scanlan	Unopposed		
Registered electors		8,082		
Irish Parliamentary hold				

=== Elections in the 1910s ===
General election 18 January 1910: North Sligo
Party	Candidate	Votes	%	±%
Irish Parliamentary	Thomas Scanlan	Unopposed		
Registered electors		7,993		
Irish Parliamentary hold				

General election 18 December 1910: North Sligo
Party	Candidate	Votes	%	±%
Irish Parliamentary	Thomas Scanlan	Unopposed		
Registered electors		7,993		
Irish Parliamentary hold				

General Election 14 December 1918: North Sligo
Party	Candidate	Votes	%	±%
Sinn Féin	J. J. Clancy	9,030	68.0	New
Irish Parliamentary	Thomas Scanlan	4,242	32.0	N/A
Majority		4,788	36.0	N/A
Turnout		13,272	71.9	N/A
Registered electors		18,448		
Sinn Féin gain from Irish Parliamentary		Swing	N/A	
