= 1922 United Kingdom general election in England =

- 15 November 1922

All 492 English seats to the House of Commons
- Turnout: 72.8% (▲17.1 pp)
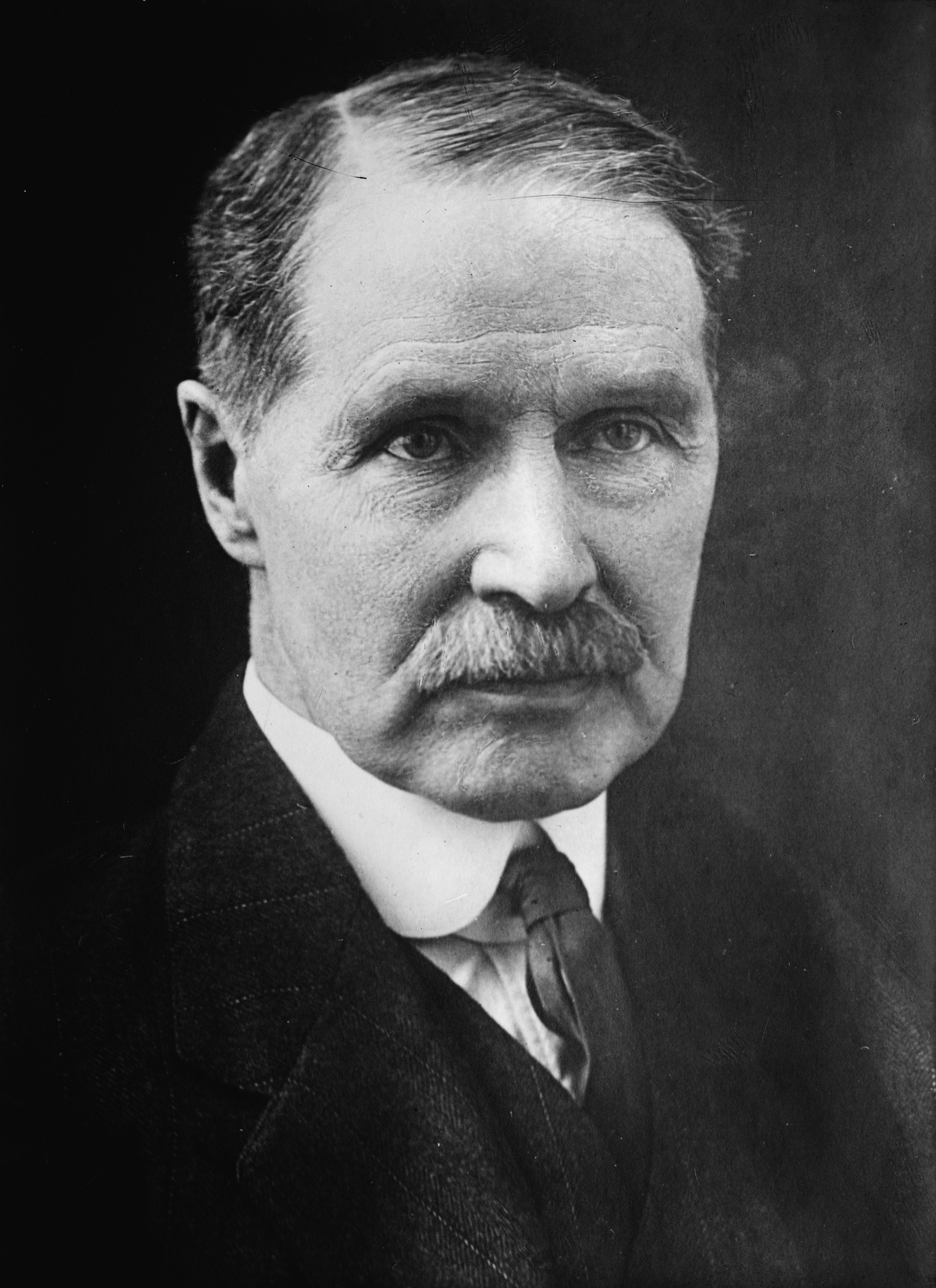

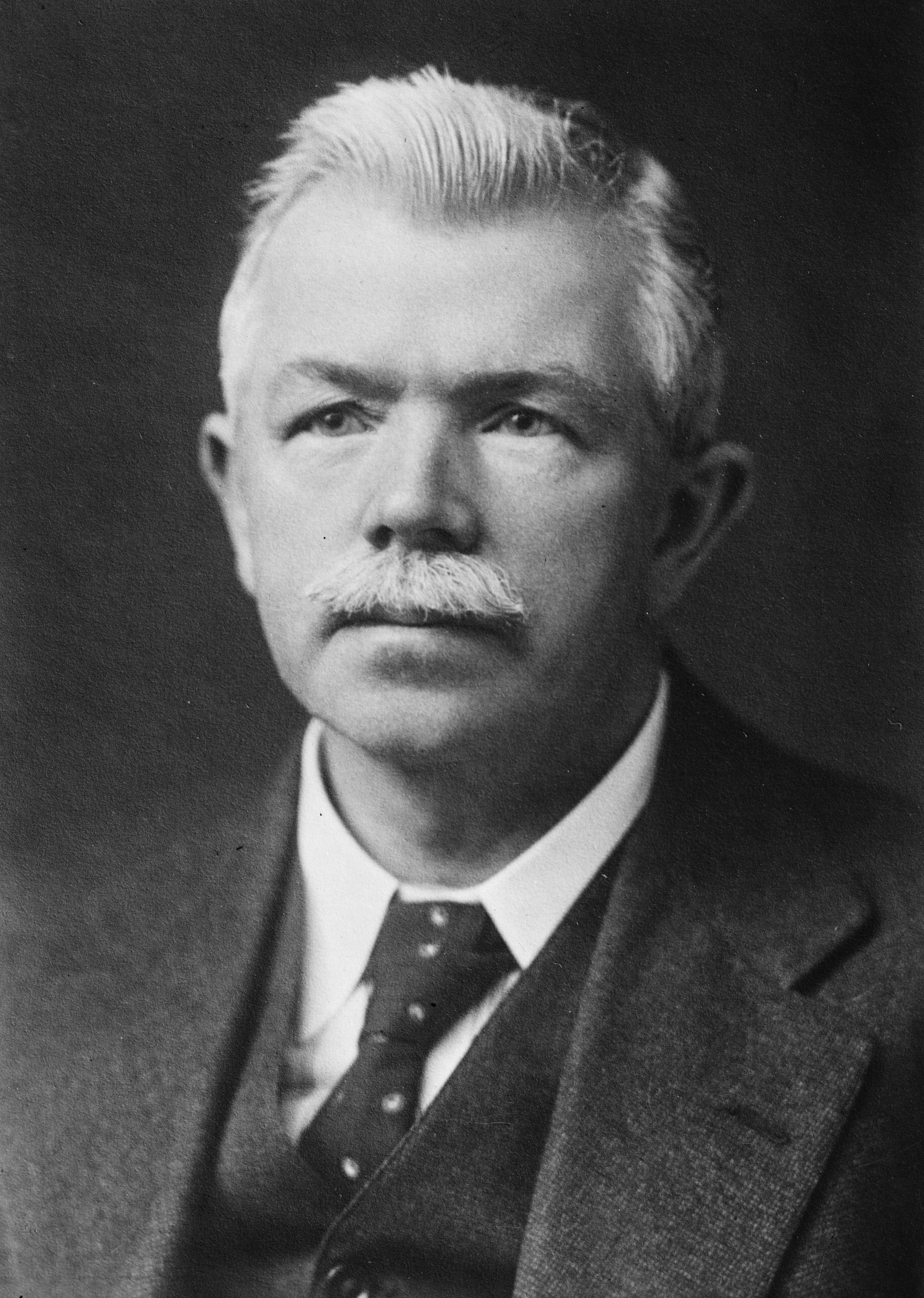

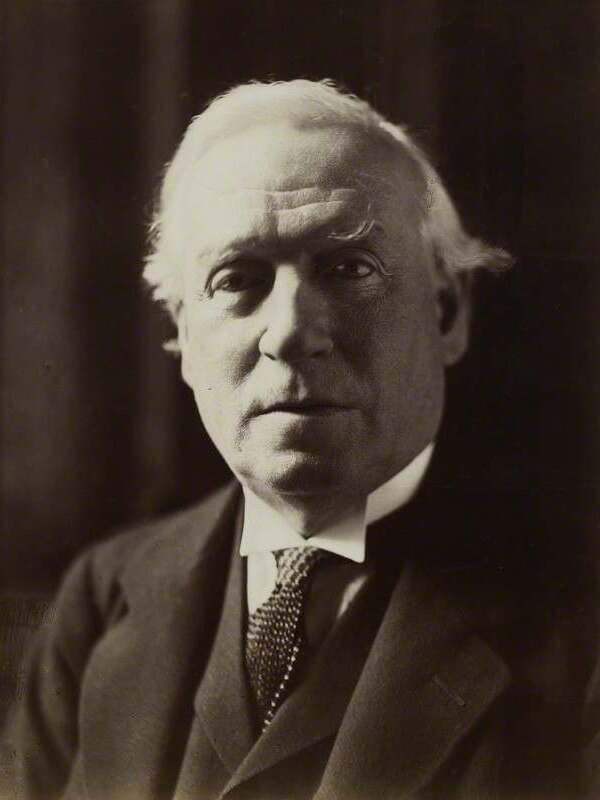

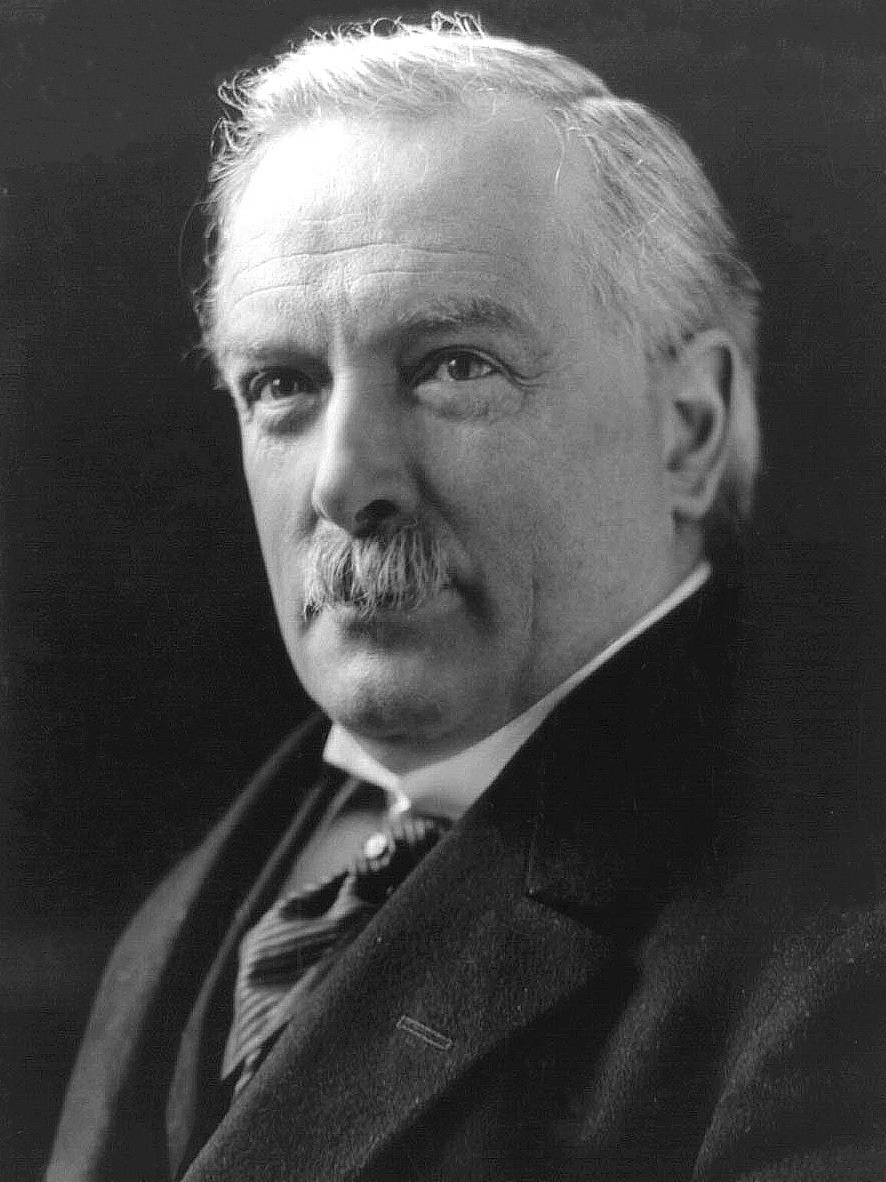
	First party	Second party
Leader	Bonar Law	J. R. Clynes
Party	Conservative	Labour
Leader since	23 October 1922	14 February 1921
Leader's seat	Glasgow; Central	Manchester; Platting
Last election	321 seats, (Note: Combined results for county, borough and university seats.) 42.6%	42 seats, 22.6%
Seats won	312	95
Seat change	▼9	▲53
Popular vote	11,696,430 (Note: Total and percentage votes given here are for territorial constituencies only.)	3,370,430
Percentage	41.5%	28.8%
Swing	▼1.1 pp	▲6.2 pp
	Third party	Fourth party
Leader	H. H. Asquith	David Lloyd George
Party	Liberal	National Liberal
Leader since	30 April 1908	7 December 1916
Leader's seat	Paisley	Caernarvon Boroughs
Last election	25 seats, 14.7%	83 seats, 11.6%
Seats won	44 (Note: Figure includes Speaker of the House of Commons John Henry Whitley in Halifax.)	32
Seat change	▲19	▼51
Popular vote	2,260,423	950,515
Percentage	19.6%	7.6%
Swing	▲4.9 pp	▼4.0 pp

On Wednesday 15 November 1922, the 1922 United Kingdom general election was held in England, to elect all 615 members of the House of Commons, with 492 constituencies being in England. 485 seats represented territorial constituencies contested under the first past the post electoral system, and seven additional seats represented the university constituencies. Three university constituencies returned two members through the single transferable vote electoral system and one returned one member by the first past the post system.

== Candidates ==
Below is a table summarising the candidates of the 1922 general election in England, excluding those in the university constituencies.

Affiliation	Candidates
Conservative and Unionist Party	406
Labour Party	331
Liberal Party	271
National Liberal Party	97 (Note: Figure includes seven former National Democratic and Labour Party candidates that stood for that party in 1918, but who stood for the National Liberal Party in this election. These were the former NDLP Members of Parliament Charles Edgar Loseby in Bradford East, James Walton in Don Valley, Clement Edwards in East Ham South, James Seddon in Hanley, Joseph Frederick Green in Leicester West, Matt Simm in Wallsend and Charles Jesson in Walthamstow West.)
Independent Conservative	16 (Note: Includes 12 candidates that stood simply as Independent Conservative candidates, and four who stood sponsored by local organisations or other minor conservative parties and organisations, such as the Anti-Waste League or Independent Parliamentary Group.)
Independent	11 (Note: The Parliamentary sources assume James Seddon in Hanley as an independent, however, he joined the rest of the National Liberal Party MPs to stand as a candidate for the National Liberal Party. Craig placed Seddon as being a National Liberal, thereby making the candidate count for Independents at 11 candidates.)
Co-operative Party	9
Independent Labour	3 (Note: The candidates that stood were Christopher Morden in Finsbury, Robert John Wilson in Newcastle upon Tyne North and Henry Mills in Nottingham South.)
Nationalist Party	2 (Note: The candidates that stood were Joseph Devlin in Liverpool Exchange and T. P. O'Connor in Liverpool Scotland.)
Communist Party of Great Britain	2 (Note: The candidates that stood were Walter Windsor in Bethnal Green North East and Joe Vaughan in Bethnal Green South West. Although Shapurji Saklatvala in Battersea North was a member of the Communist Party, he was the official Labour candidate in that seat.)
National Farmers' Union	2 (Note: The candidates that stood were Herbert Winn in Howdenshire and Edward Clark in Rutland and Stamford.)
Constitutionalist	1 (Note: Candidate George Jarrett stood in Dartford, although he was also a supporter of the National Liberal Party at this election.)
Independent Liberal	1 (Note: Candidate George Jennings stood in Paddington North. He was originally the official candidate for the Liberal Party in the seat; however, he was dis-endorsed due to his past.)
Agriculturalist	1 (Note: Candidate W. L. Steel stood in Stone.)
People's	1 (Note: Candidate Harry Osborn stood in East Ham North.)
Anti-Conservative	1 (Note: Candidate Ferdinand Cavendish-Bentinck stood in Kensington South.)
Health	1 (Note: Candidate E. H. M. Stancomb stood in Southampton.)
Total	1,156

== Analysis ==
=== Conservatives and Labour ===
The Labour Party gained 59 seats in England, however lost 6. The party therefore gained a total of 53 seats in England, and with its gains in Scotland and Wales, winning a total of 142 seats nationally. The seats it lost in England were Mansfield to the Liberal Party and Wellingborough and Rushden to the National Liberal Party (David Lloyd George's successor party to the Coalition Liberal Party). It also lost Barnard Castle, one of the two seats in Bolton, Clitheroe and Ormskirk to the Conservative Party. The Conservative Party also regained Widnes from former Leader of the Labour Party Arthur Henderson. Henderson had won the 1919 Widnes by-election against the Conservatives after having lost re-election in 1918, however lost the seat at this election. This represented no change for either party in terms of seats in comparison to the last election.

Labour also won North Norfolk which was held by an Independent who was supported by the former Coalition Government. Notably, the Labour party gained Limehouse from the National Liberal Party. The candidate that won the seat was future Labour Prime Minister Clement Attlee entered Parliament at this election. Coincidently, then Deputy Leader of the National Liberal Party and future Conservative Prime Minister Winston Churchill lost his seat in Dundee at this election.

The Conservatives, however, lost an overall nine seats at this election, with one loss being in the university constituency of Cambridge University. The Party gained several seats from the National Liberal Party. Amongst its gains was also William Greenwood in Stockport which he had gained in the 1920 Stockport by-election. This retention was gain from defunct Coalition Labour. The party won Birmingham Duddeston from the defunct National Democratic and Labour Party, along with Portsmouth Central, Stourbridge, Middlesbrough East and South Norfolk from the Liberal Party. From independents, the Conservatives won Hackney South which it retained from the 1922 Hackney South by-election, and Sowerby from an Independent Unionist Robert Hewitt Barker. Barker had been elected in the last election, however did not re-contest the seat. The Conservatives also gained Hertford compared to the last election, having retained it from the 1921 Hertford by-election at which independent-turned-Conservative Murray Sueter won the seat from an independent.

The Co-operative Party, although not yet in an electoral pact with the Labour Party but had taken the Labour Whip, also lost Kettering to the Conservatives. This was a loss of the standalone Co-operative Party (when not under the whip) when compared to the previous election. The Co-operative Party, however, did win seats in England. Alfred Barnes won East Ham South, A. V. Alexander won Sheffield Hillsborough, and Robert Morrison won Tottenham North. Including the party's fourth win in Glasgow Tradeston in Scotland, each of these wins for the Co-operative party were under the Labour Whip and therefore represented wins for the Labour Party at this election.

=== Liberals and National Liberals ===
Between the Liberal Party under H. H. Asquith and the National Liberal Party under David Lloyd George, the Liberals gained seats and the National Liberals overall lost seats. The Liberals remained the third largest Party in England despite increasing its seats to 44, with the Liberal Nationals moving from second largest to fourth at 32 seats when compared to its predecessor, the Coalition Liberal Party.

Seven former National Democratic and Labour Party candidates also stood for the National Liberal Party in this election. These were the former NDLP Members of Parliament Charles Edgar Loseby in Bradford East, James Walton in Don Valley, Chairman of the Party Clement Edwards in East Ham South, James Seddon in Hanley, Joseph Frederick Green in Leicester West, Matt Simm in Wallsend and Charles Jesson in Walthamstow West. However, each of these candidates lost their seats. Elsewhere in the United Kingdom, former NDLP candidate Charles Stanton, re-contested in Abderdare in Wales, but lost. John Taylor who was jointly Liberal Coalition and NDLP originally lost Dumbarton Burghs in Scotland. The last sitting 'member' the NDLP was Eldred Hallas, however, he had defected to the Labour Party (becoming Birmingham's first Labour Member of Parliament) but stood down from this election.

=== Minor parties and independents ===
Amongst the minor parties and independents at this election, the number of seats dropped from 21 seats to 8 overall in the county and borough constituencies.

Coalition Labour and the National Democratic and Labour Party had become defunct since the last election, with candidates either joining and standing for the Liberal National Party and losing their seats, or standing as independents. Former Coalition Labour Member of Parliament George Roberts, who had since left Coalition Labour, won one of the two seats in Norwich as an independent. Another independent, Austin Hopkinson, won Mossley. Hopkinson was originally a winning candidate and supporter of the Coalition Liberals in the previous election, although not a member of the party. His win in this election, standing rather as an independent in his own right, was a gain from the National Liberal Party. He would hold the seat until 1929, but then hold the seat again from 1931 to 1945. Then former Conservative Oswald Mosley won Harrow, having run against a candidate from his former party. With the three losses to Independents against the three gains, the number of independents was overall remain unchanged.

The disbanded National Party lost its two seats at this election. It lost Walsall to the Liberal Party. It also lost Bournemouth wherein former-National Party Member of Parliament Henry Page Croft won the seat after having switched to the Conservative Party.

A total of 16 Independent Conservative candidates stood in the county and borough constituencies at the election. 12 simply as Independent Conservative candidates, with four who stood sponsored by local organisations or other minor conservative parties and organisations, such as the Anti-Waste League or Independent Parliamentary Group. James Erskine won Westminster St George's in sponsorship of the St George's, Hanover Square, Independent Conservative Association, with Harry Becker winning Richmond (Surrey) as part of the Anti-Waste League. Both won seats from the Conservative Party. Additionally, Gordon Hall Caine won East Dorset from former Coalition Liberal Chief Whip Freddie Guest, therefore representing a gain from the National Liberal Party. With Robert Hewitt Barker losing his seat in Sowerby to the Conservatives, the number of Conservative Independent seats was increased to three seats in total.

Josiah Wedgwood, who is classed as an Independent Liberal (due to not receiving a coalition Coupon at the last election) although he was a member of the Liberal Party, won Newcastle-under-Lyme though as the official Labour candidate. However, an Independent Liberal, J. R. M. Butler, won in the seat at Cambridge University constituency against the Conservatives in the second round of voting in that seat. The number of Independent Liberals was unchanged. George Jarrett, who is classed as a National Liberal but also standing on the basis of being a Constitutionalist candidate, won Dartford.

Finally, Irish Nationalist T. P. O'Connor retained Liverpool Scotland unopposed, however candidate Joseph Devlin failed to win Liverpool Exchange against the Conservatives.

== Seat summary ==
Below is a table summarising the total number of seats, gains and losses for each party in both the territorial county and borough constituencies and the English university constituencies.

Party	Seats				
Party	Total	Gains	Losses	Net	Of all (%)
Conservative	312	41	50	▼9	63.4
Labour (Total)	95	60	7	▲53	19.3
Labour	92	57	6	▲51	18.7
Co-operative Party	3	3	1	▲2	0.6
Liberal	44	34	15	▲19	8.9
National Liberal	32	5	56	▼51	6.5
Independent	3	3	3	Steady	0.6
Independent Conservative	3	3	0	▲3	0.6
Constitutionalist	1	New		▲1	0.2
Irish Nationalist	1	0	0	Steady	0.2
Independent Liberal	1	1	1	Steady	0.2
Other non-contested	0	0	16	▼15	—
Total	492				

== County and borough constituency results ==
Below is a table summarising the constituency results of the 1922 general election in England, excluding the result in the university constituencies.

Party	Seats					Aggregate votes		
Party	Total	Gains	Losses	Net	Of all (%)	Total	Of all (%) (Note: Adjusted for multi-member constituencies.)	Change (%)
Conservative	312	41	50	▼9	63.4	4,809,797	41.5	▼1.1
Labour (Total)	95	60	7	▲53	19.6	3,370,430	28.8	▲6.2 (Note: Includes the increase of the Co-operative Party standing with Labour compared to the last election.)
Labour	92	57	6	▲51	19.0	3,272,900	28.0	▲5.4
Co-operative Party	3	3 (Note: Alfred Barnes in East Ham South, A. V. Alexander in Sheffield Hillsborough and Robert Morrison in Tottenham North.)	1 (Note: Alfred Waterson in Kettering.)	▲2	0.6	97,530	0.8	▲0.3
Liberal	44	34	15	▲19	9.1	2,260,423	19.3	▲4.9
National Liberal	31	5	56	▼51	6.4	950,515	8.1	▼4.0
Independent	3	3	3 (Note: Includes loss for Coalition Independent.)	Steady	0.6	113,660	1.0	▲0.4
Independent Conservative	3	3	0	▲3	0.6	99,789	0.9	▲0.8
Constitutionalist	1 (Note: George Jarrett in Dartford, although he was also a supporter of the National Liberal Party at this election.)	New		▲1	0.2	16,662	0.1	New
Health	0	0	0	Steady	—	14,193	0.1	Steady
Irish Nationalist	1 (Note: T. P. O'Connor in Liverpool Scotland.)	0	0	Steady	0.2	12,614	0.1	▼0.1
Farmers' Union	0	0	0	Steady	—	11,492	0.1	▼0.1
Communist	0	New			—	9,693	0.1	New
Independent Labour	0	0	0	Steady	—	6,490	0.1	▼0.9
Independent Liberal	0	0	1	▼1	—	6,444	0.1	Steady
Agriculturalist	0	0	0	Steady	—	5,243	0.0	▼0.1
Anti-Conservative	0	New			—	4,964	0.0	New
People's	0	New			—	4,021	0.0	New
Other non-contested	0	—N/a		▼16 (Note: 8 National Democratic and Labour Party seats, 3 Coalition Labour seats, 2 National Party seats, 1 Independent Unionist seat, and 1 National Socialist Party seat.)	—	0	0.0	—N/a
Total	485			0	100.0	11,696,430	100.0	0.0
Registered voters, and turnout						15,453,819 (Note: Electorate in contested constituencies. The total electorate was 16,726,739.)	72.8	▲17.1

Popular vote
Conservative	41.5%
Labour	28.8%
Liberal	19.6%
National Liberal	7.6%
Independent	1.0%
Ind. Conservative	0.9%
Other	0.6%

Parliament seats
Conservative	63.3%
Labour	19.6%
Liberal	9.1%
National Liberal	6.4%
Independent	0.6%
Ind. Conservative	0.6%
Other	0.4%

== University constituency results ==
=== University results summary ===
Below is a table summarising the seats and vote share of the English university constituencies in the 1922 general election.

Party	Seats				First preference votes	
Party	Total	Gains	Losses	Net	Total	Of all (%)
Conservative	5	0	1	▼1	13,196	55.7
Liberal	0	0	0	Steady	3,624	15.3
Independent Liberal	1	1	0	▲1	3,453	14.6
Labour	0	0	0	Steady	1,788	7.6
National Liberal	1	0	0	Steady	819	3.5
Independent	0	0	0	Steady	571	2.4
Ind. Conservative	0	0	0	Steady	231	1.0
Total	7				23,682	

=== Cambridge University ===
The constituency for Cambridge University returned two Members of Parliament using the single transferable vote electoral system. The electorate consisted of graduates of the university.

General election 1922: Cambridge University (2 seats)
Party	Candidate	FPv%	Count
Party	Candidate	FPv%	1
Conservative	John Rawlinson	49.39	4,192
Independent Liberal	J. R. M. Butler	39.86	3,453
Conservative	William Ritchie Sorley	11.75	1,018
Electorate: 13,592 Valid: 8,663 Quota: 2,888 Turnout: 63.74%

=== Combined English Universities ===
The Combined English Universities constituency, which represented effectively all red brick universities and Durham University, returned two Members of Parliament using the single transferable vote electoral system. The electorate consisted of graduates of the university.

General Election 1922: Combined English Universities (2 seats)
Party	Candidate	FPv%	Count				
Party	Candidate	FPv%	1	2	3	4	5
Conservative	Martin Conway	32.8	968	982	1,093		
National Liberal	H. A. L. Fisher	27.7	819	821	849	883	1,009
Independent	John Strong	19.4	571	575	595	611	813
Labour	Leonard Woolf	12.2	361	361	365	366	eliminated
Ind. Conservative	Wilfred Barnard Faraday	4.8	141	206	eliminated		
Ind. Conservative	Sidney C. Lawrence	3.1	90	eliminated			
Electorate: 3,967 Valid: 2,946 Quota: 983 Turnout: 74.3%

=== London University ===
The constituency for London University returned one Member of Parliament using the First-past-the-post electoral system. The electorate consisted of graduates of the university.

General election 1922: London University
Party	Candidate	Votes	%	±%
Conservative	Sydney Russell-Wells	3,833	51.52	+9.96
Liberal	Albert Pollard	2,180	29.30	New
Labour	H. G. Wells	1,427	19.18	−12.49
Majority		1,653	22.22	+12.33
Turnout		7,440	67.64	−1.37
Registered electors		11,000		
Conservative hold		Swing		

=== Oxford University ===
The constituency for Oxford University returned two Members of Parliament using the single transferable vote electoral system. The electorate consisted of graduates of the university.

General Election 1922: Oxford University (2 seats)
Party	Candidate	FPv%	Count	
Party	Candidate	FPv%	1	2
Conservative	Lord Hugh Cecil	56.40	3,185	
Conservative	Charles Oman	18.03	1,018	2,170
Liberal	Gilbert Murray	25.57	1,444	1,594
Electorate: 9,374 Valid: 5,647 Quota: 1,883 Turnout: 60.24%

== See also ==
- 1922 United Kingdom general election in Scotland
- 1922 United Kingdom general election in Wales
- 1922 United Kingdom general election in Northern Ireland
