= List of MPs for constituencies in Wales (1922–1923) =

- 15 November 1922
- Colours on map indicate the party allegiance of each constituency's MP.

This is a list of members of Parliament in Wales, elected to the House of Commons of the United Kingdom in the 1922 general election.

== Composition ==
Affiliation	Members
Labour Party	18
National Liberal	9
Conservative Party	6
Liberal Party	2
Independent Labour	1
Total	36

== MPs ==
MP	Constituency	Party	In constituency since
George Barker	Abertillery	Labour Party	1920 by-election
Reginald Clarry	Newport	Conservative Party	1922 by-election
William Cope	Llandaff and Barry	Conservative Party	1918
James Cory	Cardiff South	Conservative Party	1918
David Davies	Montgomeryshire	Liberal Party	1906
Evan Davies	Ebbw Vale	Labour Party	1920 by-election
John Cledwyn Davies	Denbigh	National Liberal	1922
Charles Edwards	Bedwellty	Labour Party	1918
Ernest Evans	Cardiganshire	National Liberal	1921 by-election
Leolin Forestier-Walker	Monmouth	Conservative Party	1918
James Childs Gould	Cardiff Central	Conservative Party	1918
Thomas Griffiths	Pontypool	Labour Party	1918
John Henry Williams	Llanelly	Labour Party	1922
David Grenfell	Gower	Labour Party	1922
George Hall	Aberdare	Labour Party	1922
Vernon Hartshorn	Ogmore	Labour Party	1918
John Hinds	Carmarthen	National Liberal	1918
William Jenkins	Neath	Labour Party	1922
William Jenkins	Brecon and Radnor	National Liberal	1922
William John	Rhondda West	Labour Party	1920 by-election
Henry Haydn Jones	Merioneth	Liberal Party	January 1910
Morgan Jones	Caerphilly	Labour Party	1921 by-election
Robert Jones	Caernarvonshire	Labour Party	1922
Thomas Mardy Jones	Pontypridd	Labour Party	1922 by-election
David Lloyd George	Caernarvon Boroughs	National Liberal	1890
Gwilym Lloyd George	Pembrokeshire	National Liberal	1922
Lewis Lougher	Cardiff East	Conservative Party	1918
Ramsay MacDonald	Aberavon	Labour Party	1922
Alfred Mond	Swansea West	National Liberal	1918
Tom Parry	Flintshire	National Liberal	1918
Robert Richards	Wrexham	Labour Party	1922
Owen Thomas	Anglesey	Independent Labour	1918
R. C. Wallhead	Merthyr	Labour Party	1922
David Watts-Morgan	Rhondda East	Labour Party	1918
David Williams	Swansea East	Labour Party	1922
Thomas Arthur Lewis	University of Wales	National Liberal	1922

== By-elections ==
- 1923 Anglesey by-election

== See also ==
- List of MPs elected in the 1922 United Kingdom general election
- 1922 United Kingdom general election
- 1922 United Kingdom general election in Wales
