= 1922 United Kingdom general election in Scotland =

- 15 November 1922

All 74 Scottish seats to the House of Commons
- Turnout: 70.4% (▲15.3 pp)
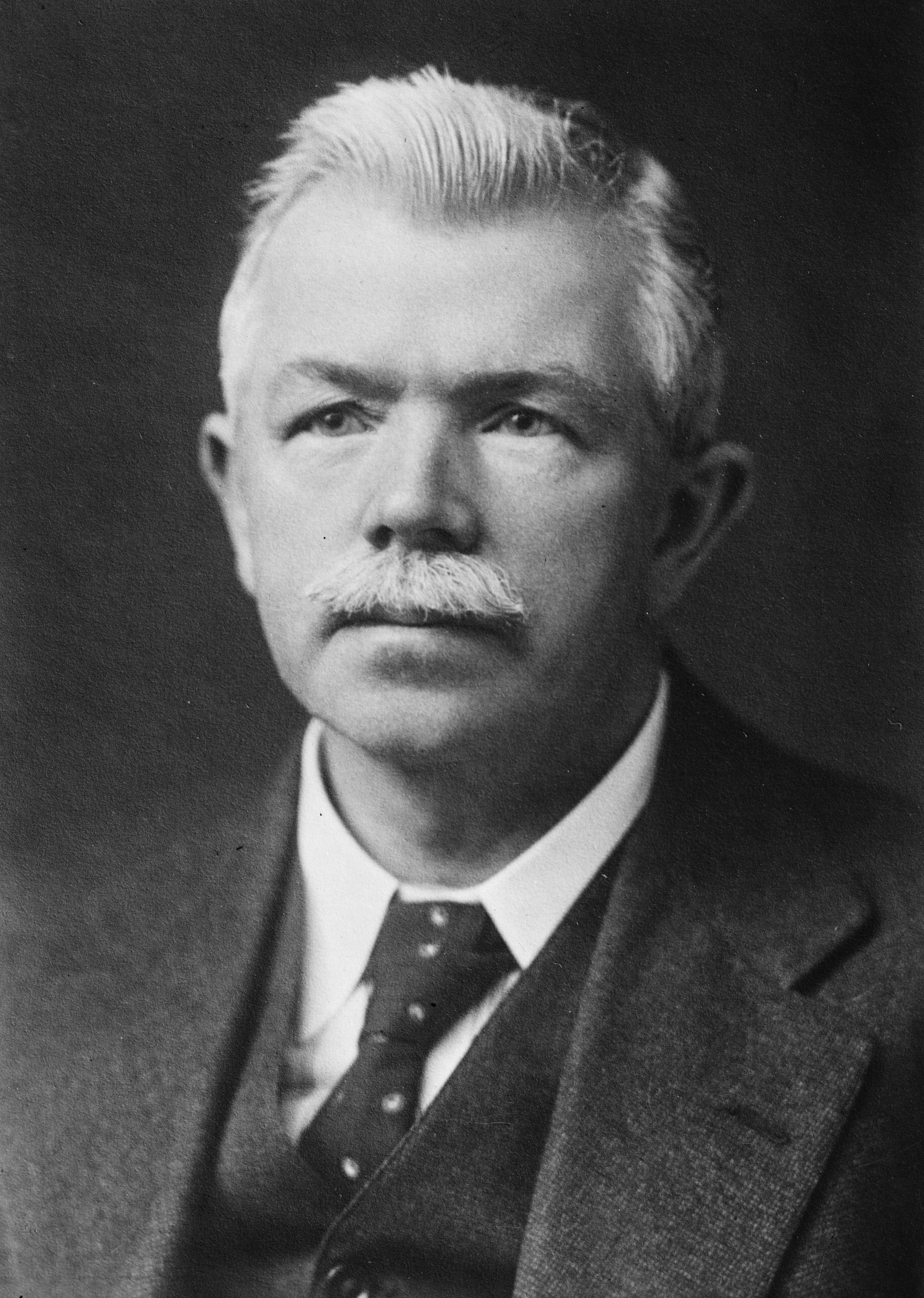

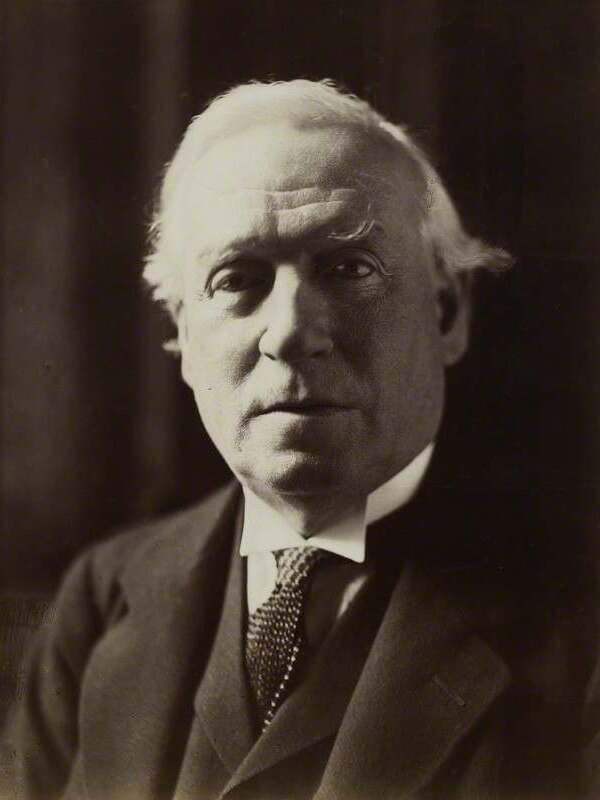

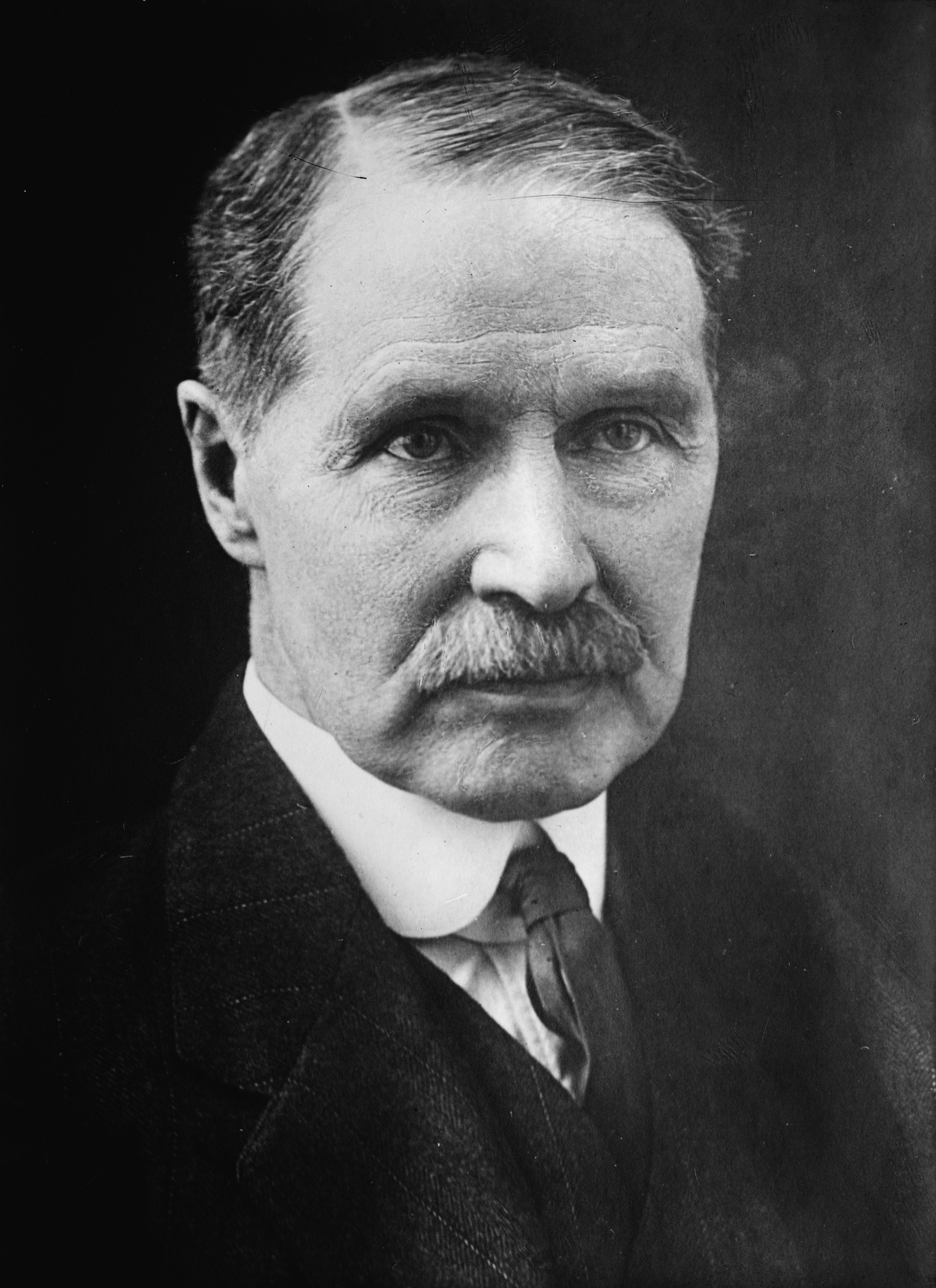

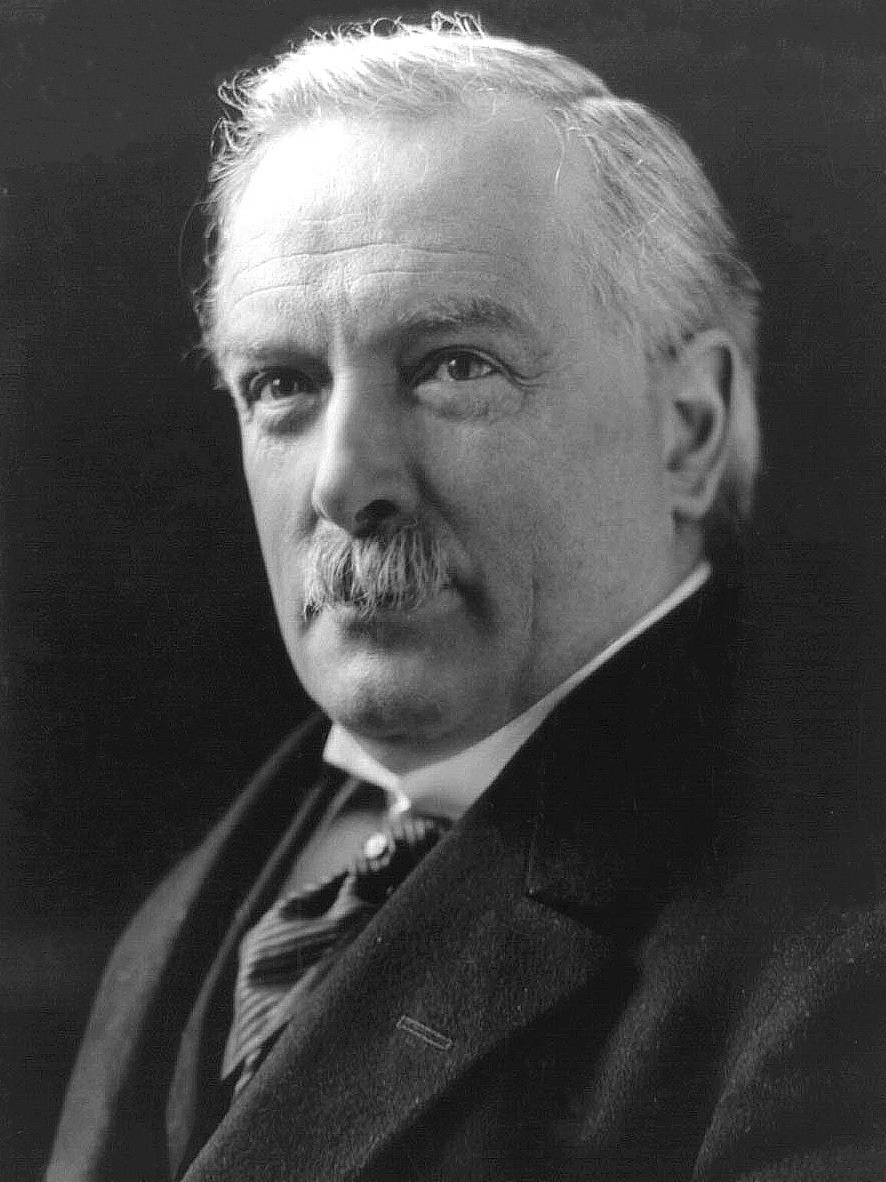

	First party	Second party	Third party
Leader	J. R. Clynes	H. H. Asquith	Bonar Law
Party	Labour	Liberal	Unionist
Alliance		Liberal	Conservative
Leader since	14 February 1921	30 April 1908	23 October 1922
Leader's seat	Manchester; Platting	Paisley	Glasgow; Central
Last election	6 seats, (Note: Combined results for burgh, county and university seats); 22.9%	8 seats, 15.0%	32 seats, (Note: Unionist decline is compared to combined Coalition & non-Coalition Unionist results in 1918.); 32.8%
Seats won	29	16	15
Seat change	▲23	▲8	▼17
Popular vote	501,254 (Note: Total and percentage votes given here are for territorial constituencies only)	328,649	379,396
Percentage	32.2%	21.5%	25.1%
Swing	▲9.3 pp	▲6.5 pp	▼7.7 pp
	Fourth party	Fifth party	Sixth party
Leader	David Lloyd George	Albert Inkpin	Edwin Scrymgeour
Party	National Liberal	Communist	Scottish Prohibition
Leader since	7 December 1916	1920	1901
Leader's seat	Carnarvon Boroughs	Did not stand	Dundee
Last election	26 seats, (Note: National Liberal decline is compared to Coalition Liberal results in 1918); 19.1%	Did not contest	0 seats, 0.5%
Seats won	12	1	1
Seat change	▼14	▲1	▲1
Popular vote	288,529	23,944	32,578
Percentage	17.7%	1.4%	1.0%
Swing	▼1.4 pp	New party	▲0.5 pp

On Wednesday 15 November 1922, the 1922 United Kingdom general election was held in Scotland, to elect all 615 members of the House of Commons, with 74 seats being in Scotland. 71 seats represented burgh and county constituencies contested under the first past the post electoral system, and three represented the Combined Scottish Universities multi-member University constituency, which used the Single Transferable Vote (STV) method.

Of the party leaders, two represented Scottish constituencies, with Bonar Law representing Glasgow Central and Asquith representing Paisley.

== Candidates ==
Below is a table summarising the candidates of the 1922 general election in Scotland, excluding those in the Combined Scottish Universities constituency.

Affiliation	Candidates
Scottish Liberal Party	48
Labour Party	41
Unionist Party	36
National Liberal Party	33
Communist Party of Great Britain	3 (Note: The candidates that stood were Willie Gallacher in Dundee, Alec Geddes in Greenock and Walton Newbold in Motherwell.)
Co-operative Party	2 (Note: The candidates that stood were Tom Henderson in Glasgow Tradeston and John Biggar in Paisley.)
Scottish Prohibition Party	1 (Note: Leader Edwin Scrymgeour stood in Dundee.)
Independent Unionist	1 (Note: Candidate Hugh Ferguson stood in Motherwell.)
Independent Liberal	1 (Note: Candidate John Hope stood in Berwick and Haddington.)
Independent Communist	1 (Note: Candidate John Maclean stood in Glasgow Gorbals.)
Anti-Parliamentary Communist Federation	1 (Note: Leader Guy Aldred stood in Glasgow Shettleston.)
Total	168

== Outcome ==
The election saw major gains for the Labour Party, which had entered the election as Scotland's sixth largest party, and emerged from the election as the largest party in Scotland. The Conservative Party, which were in association with the Unionist Party (Scotland) in Scotland, and the National Liberals suffered heavy losses. These two parties had composed the ruling coalition government under David Lloyd George, which had collapsed following the Conservatives withdrawal from the coalition amidst several scandals. Most of the elected Labour MP's had included support for Scottish Home Rule in their manifestos. Part of the reason for Labour's success came from a shift in the political alignment of Scottish Catholics of Irish descent, who had prior to Irish independence voted Liberal due to the party's support for Irish Home Rule. Despite this, the two Liberal parties received between them 39.2% of the Scottish vote.

=== Labour and Unionists ===
Much like in the rest of the United Kingdom, Labour had overall almost tripled its number of seats across the country, with several of its gains coming from Scotland. Labour gained Stirling and Falkirk and Peebles and Southern Midlothian from the Liberal Party. Future Secretary of State for Scotland Joseph Westwood entered Parliament in Peebles and Southern Midlothian. From the National Liberal Party (when compared to the National Liberal Party's predecessor, the Coalition Liberal Party), Labour gained Dunfermline Burghs, Glasgow Bridgeton, East Renfrewshire, West Renfrewshire, Rutherglen, Dumbarton Burghs and Glasgow Bridgeton. Within Dumbarton Burghs, future leading figure during the Red Clydeside era, David Kirkwood, entered Parliament. Additionally, another prominent figure in the Red Clydeside era and future chair of the Independent Labour Party, James Maxton, entered Parliament in Glasgow Bridgeton.

The Labour Party also gained Clackmannan and Eastern Stirlingshire, West Stirlingshire, North Lanarkshire, Glasgow Maryhill, Glasgow Camlachie, Coatbridge, Glasgow Springburn, Glasgow Tradeston, Glasgow St Rollox, Glasgow Shettleston and Linlithgowshire from the Unionist Party. Tom Henderson won Glasgow Tradeston for the Co-operative Party, which was under the Labour Whip, and therefore a gain for the Labour Party. Henderson was the first election Co-operative MP elected in Scotland, and one of four elected across the United Kingdom at this election.

John Robertson, member of the Labour Party, who had won Bothwell in the 1919 Bothwell by-election, retained the seat. Robertson's retention of the seat represented a gain from the Unionists when compared to the previous election. Notably, another future Secretary of State for Scotland, Tom Johnston entered Parliament in West Stirlingshire. George Hardie, the younger brother of the founder of the Labour Party Keir Hardie, also entered Parliament in Glasgow Springburn, after having unsuccessfully contested the seat in the 1918 general election.

However, the Unionist Party, which was in close association with the national Conservative Party, gained the seat of Perth. Future Parliamentary Under-Secretary of State for Scotland Noel Skelton won Perth, and would remain in Parliament until his death in 1935. This was a gain from the National Liberals under George Lloyd when compared to the National Liberals in Scotland. The Unionist Party also held its two seats in the Combined Scottish Universities constituency unopposed. Notably, the Conservative Prime Minister Bonar Law had only been in office since 20 October 1922, barely a month before the election was held.

=== Liberal and Liberal National ===
However, The Unionists also lost Aberdeen and Kincardine Central, Forfarshire, East Fife, Edinburgh West and Dumfriesshire to the Scottish Liberals. Of these seats, Liberal member and former New Zealander parliamentarian William Chapple returned to Westminster in Dumfriesshire after having lost his old constituency in Stirlingshire in the January 1910 general election.

The Liberals also made gains from the National Liberals, when comparing the National Liberals to the predecessor Coalition Liberals. The Liberal Party gained Orkney and Shetland, wherein future Scottish Liberal Party Whip Sir Robert Hamilton gained the seat from the National Liberals. Hamilton would go on to serve as an Under-Secretary in the Stanley Baldwin's National Government. The Liberals also won Aberdeen and Kincardine East, (Note: Elected member Frederick Martin would, however, defect to the Labour Party after the general election in 1929.) West Aberdeenshire and Kincardine, Galloway, Banffshire and Kilmarnock from Lloyd George's Liberals, when compared to the Coalition Liberals in 1918 (Liberals who had obtained Coalition Coupons but who were part of the Liberal Party, rather than the Liberal National Party at the time of the 1922 general election). Notably, after having lost his seat of East Fife in the 1918 election, H. H. Asquith had returned to Parliament in Paisley in the 1920 Paisley by-election. His retention was a retain for the Scottish Liberal Party.

Conversely, the National Liberals gained Western Isles from the Liberal Party. The Liberal National Party also gained Kinross and Western Perthshire under incumbent member James Gardiner. Gardiner, although a supported of David Lloyd George in the 1918 general election, was not awarded a Coalition Coupon (which was rather given to his opposing Unionist candidate). As a member of the National Liberals, his retention in comparison to the Coalition Liberals in the previous election was a gain for the National Liberals against the Liberal Party.

=== Minor Parties ===
Two minor parties were also able to pick up seats with the Communist Party gaining Motherwell. The member elected in the seat, Walton Newbold, was the first communist Member of Parliament elected under the label of communist, where other communist candidates in this election (such as Shapurji Saklatvala in England) stood as candidates of the Labour Party. However, he may not be regarded as the first ever communist Member of Parliament; rather, Cecil Malone is often regarded as the first, having defected from the Liberal Party to the Communists in 1920.

In conjunction with Labour retaining one of the two seats in Dundee, the Scottish Prohibition Party took the other of the two seats, gaining a seat, and thereby taking Deputy Leader of the National Liberal Party and future Conservative Prime Minister Winston Churchill's seat in the process.

Former Independent Labour Member of Parliament Frank Rose re-contested Aberdeen North as an official candidate for the Labour Party. His personal retention of the seat under Labour represented a gain for Labour against Independent Labour. Additionally, Member of Parliament and former Leader of the Labour Party George Barnes, who had been part of Coalition Labour, did not re-contest Glasgow Gorbals, resulting in Labour re-taking the and thereby gaining the seat compared to the last election.

== Seat summary ==
Below is a table summarising the total number of seats, gains and losses for each party in both the territorial county and burgh constituencies and the Combined Scottish Universities constituency.

Party	Seats				
Party	Total	Gains	Losses	Net	Of total (%)
Labour (Total)	29	23	0	▲23	40.8
Labour	28	22	0	▲22	39.4
Co-operative Party	1	1	0	▲1	1.4
Liberal	16	12	4	▲8	21.6
Unionist	15	1	18	▼17	20.3
National Liberal	12	2	16	▼14	16.2
Scottish Prohibition	1	1	0	▲1	1.4
Communist	1	1	0	▲1	1.4
Other non-contested	0	—N/a		▼2 (Note: Former Independent Labour Member of Parliament Frank Rose re-contested Aberdeen North as an official candidate for the Labour Party; Coalition Labour Member of Parliament and former Leader of the Labour Party George Barnes did not re-contest Glasgow Gorbals.)	—
Total	74				

== County and burgh constituency results ==
Below is a table summarising the constituency results of the 1922 general election in Scotland, excluding the result in the Combined Scottish Universities constituency.

Party	Seats					Aggregate votes		
Party	Total	Gains	Losses	Net	Of total (%)	Total	Of total (%) (Note: Adjusted for multi-member constituencies.)	Change (%)
Labour (Total)	29	23	0	▲23	40.8	501,254	32.2	▲9.3 (Note: Includes the increase of the Co-operative Party standing with Labour compared to the last election.)
Labour	28	22	0	▲22	39.4	472,375	30.4	▲7.5
Co-operative Party	1	1 (Note: Tom Henderson in Glasgow Tradeston.)	0	▲1	1.4	28,879	1.8	Steady
Liberal	15	11	4	▲7	21.1	328,649	21.5	▲6.5
Unionist	13	1 (Note: Noel Skelton in Perth.)	18	▼17	18.3	379,396	25.1	▼7.7
National Liberal	12	2	15	▼13	16.9	288,529	17.7	▼1.4
Scottish Prohibition	1 (Note: Edwin Scrymgeour in Dundee.)	1	0	▲1	1.4	32,578	1.0	▲0.5
Communist	1 (Note: Walton Newbold in Motherwell.)	New		▲1	1.4	23,944	1.4	New
Ind. Unionist	0	0	0	Steady	—	7,214	0.5	▲0.3
Ind. Communist	0	New			—	4,027	0.3	New
Independent Liberal	0	New			—	3,300	0.2	New
AP Communist	0	New			—	470	0.0	New
Other non-contested	0	—N/a		▼2 (Note: Former Independent Labour Member of Parliament Frank Rose re-contested Aberdeen North as an official candidate for the Labour Party; Coalition Labour Member of Parliament and former Leader of the Labour Party George Barnes did not re-contest Glasgow Gorbals.)	—	0	0.0	—N/a
Total	71			0	100.0	1,569,361	100.0	0.0
Registered voters, and turnout						2,149,479 (Note: Electorate in contested constituencies. The total electorate was 2,231,532.)	70.4	▲15.3

Popular vote
Labour	32.2%
Unionist	25.1%
Liberal	21.5%
National Liberal	17.7%
Communist	1.4%
SPP	1.0%
Other	1.1%

Parliamentary seats
Labour	39.2%
Liberal	21.6%
Unionist	20.3%
National Liberal	16.2%
SPP	1.4%
Communist	1.4%

== Combined Scottish Universities result ==
The constituency for Combined Scottish Universities returned three Members of Parliament using the single transferable vote electoral system. The electorate consisted of graduates of the university.

As Liberal Party candidate Dugald Cowan had been a Coupon Coalition under the Coalition Liberals in 1918, but stood simply as a Liberal Party candidate (and not under Lloyd George's National Liberals), this was a gain for the Liberal Party from the National Liberals when compared to the previous election. The Liberals had therefore gained 12 seats in Scotland, bringing their total to 16 seats.

General election, November 1922: Combined Scottish Universities
Party	Candidate	Votes	%	±%
Unionist	Sir George Andreas Berry	Unopposed		
Liberal	Dugald McCoig Cowan	Unopposed		
Unionist	Sir Henry Craik	Unopposed		

== See also ==
- 1922 United Kingdom general election in England
- 1922 United Kingdom general election in Wales
- 1922 United Kingdom general election in Northern Ireland
- Dundee in the 1922 general election
