= 1916 North Fermanagh by-election =

UK Parliamentary by-election

The 1916 North Fermanagh by-election was held on 27 October 1916. The by-election was held due to the resignation of the incumbent Irish Unionist MP, Godfrey Fetherstonhaugh. It was won by the Irish Unionist candidate Edward Archdale who was unopposed due to a War-time electoral pact.
