= 1922 United Kingdom general election in Wales =

- 15 November 1922

All 36 Welsh seats to the House of Commons
- Turnout: 79.4% (▲13.5 pp)
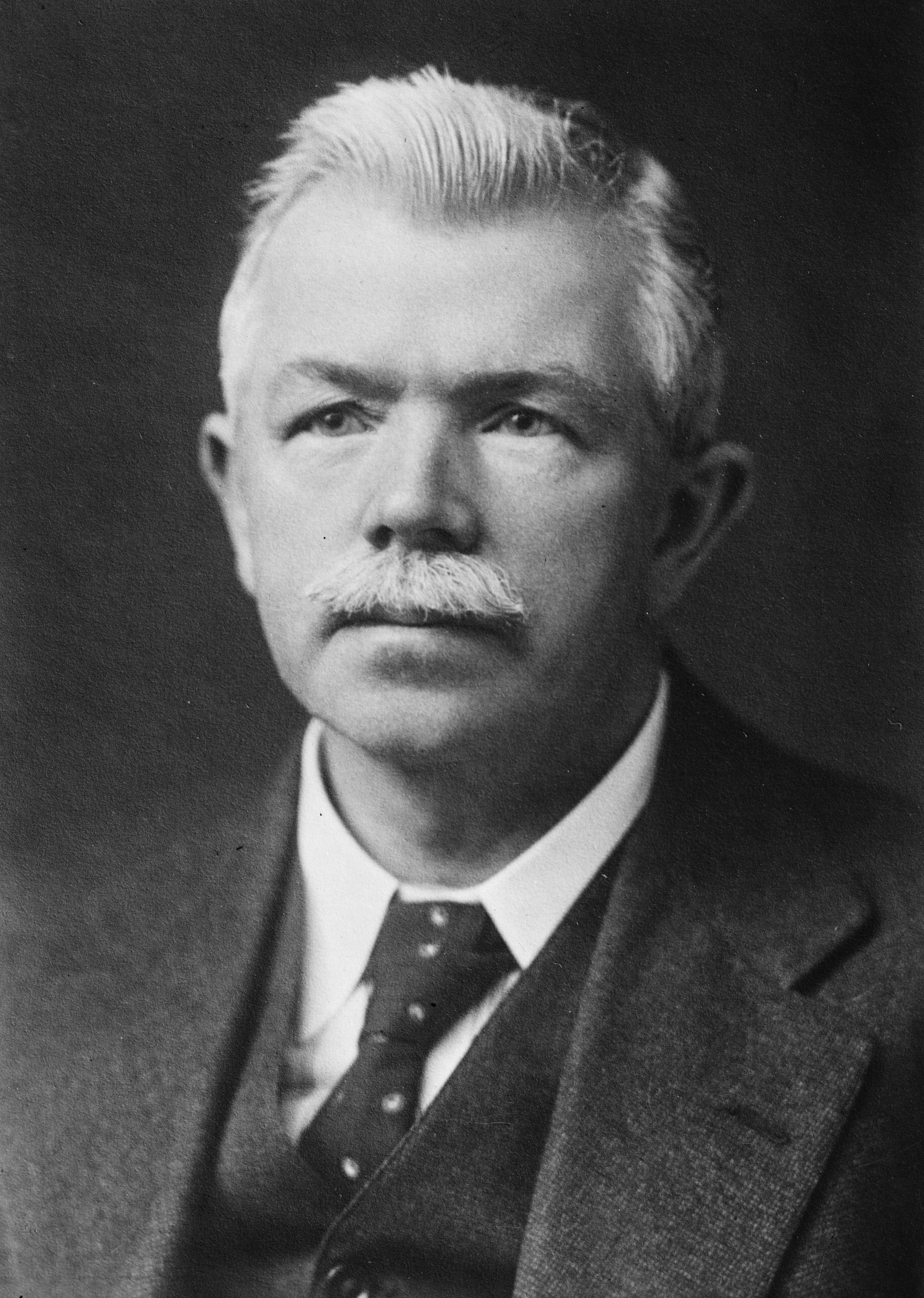

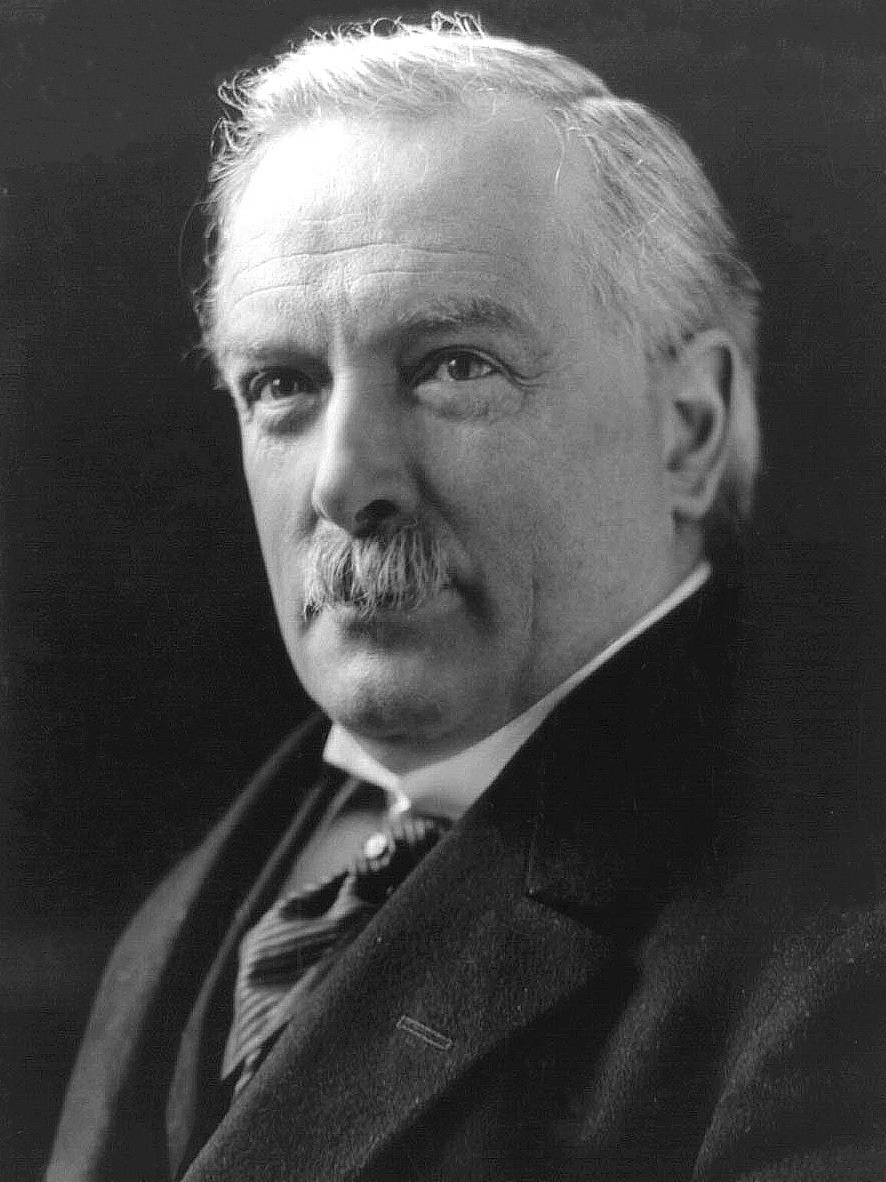

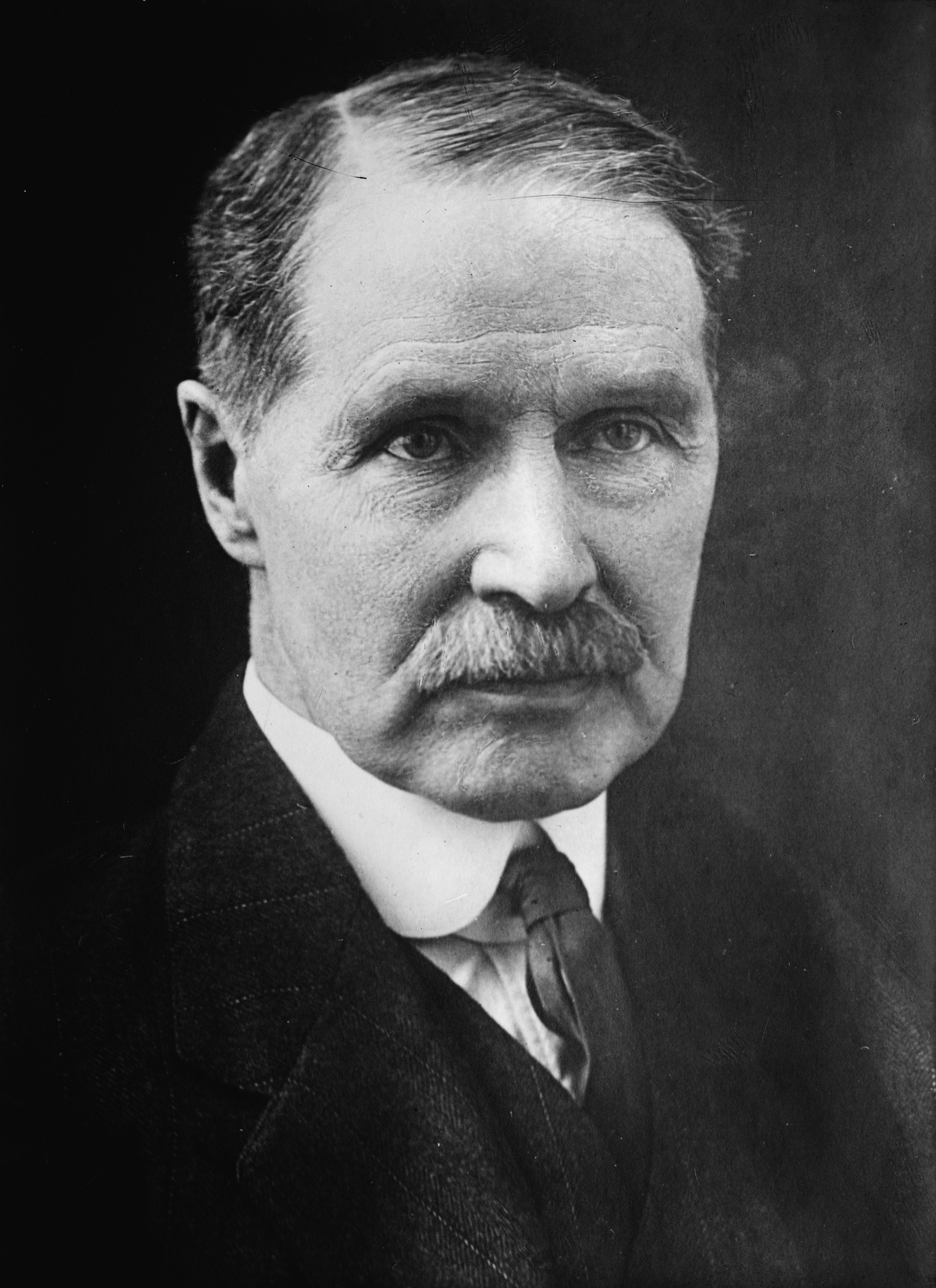

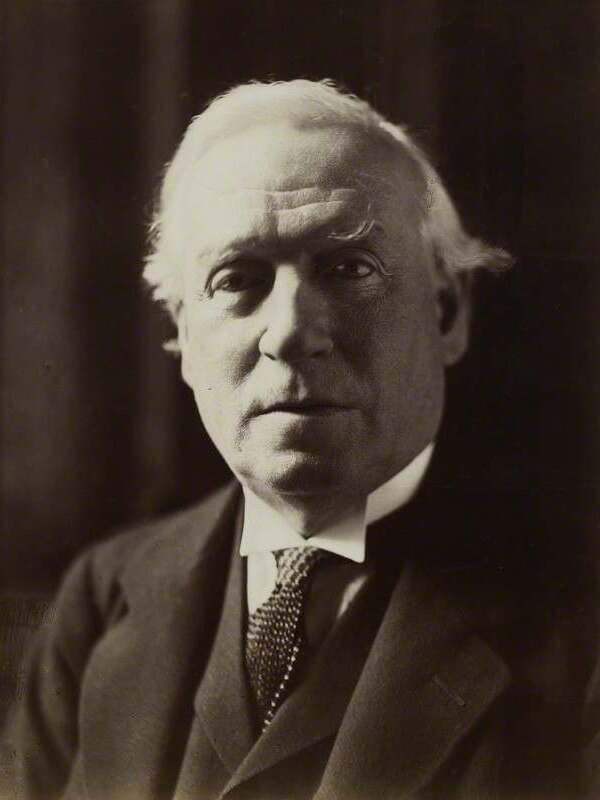
	First party	Second party
Leader	J. R. Clynes	David Lloyd George
Party	Labour	National Liberal
Leader since	14 February 1921	7 December 1916
Leader's seat	Manchester; Platting	Caernarvon Boroughs
Last election	9 seats, (Note: Combined results for county, borough and university seats.) 30.8%	18 seats, 39.2% (Note: National Liberal Party is compared to Coalition Liberal results in 1918.)
Seats won	18	9
Seat change	▲9	▼9
Popular vote	363,568 (Note: Total and percentage votes given here are for territorial constituencies only.)	231,026
Percentage	40.7%	25.9%
Swing	▲9.9 pp	▼13.3 pp
	Third party	Fourth party
Leader	Bonar Law	H. H. Asquith
Party	Conservative	Liberal
Leader since	23 October 1922	30 April 1908
Leader's seat	Glasgow; Central	Paisley
Last election	4 seats, 11.3%	3 seats, 9.7%
Seats won	6	2
Seat change	▲2	▼1
Popular vote	190,919	74,931
Percentage	21.4%	8.4%
Swing	▲10.1 pp	▼1.3 pp

On Wednesday 15 November 1922, the 1922 United Kingdom general election was held in Wales, to elect all 615 members of the House of Commons, with 36 constituencies being in Wales. 35 seats represented territorial constituencies contested under the first past the post electoral system, and one additional seat represented the University of Wales which was also contested under the first past the post electoral system.

== Candidates ==
Below is a table summarising the candidates of the 1922 general election in Wales, excluding those in the University of Wales constituency.

Affiliation	Candidates
Labour Party	28
Conservative and Unionist Party	19
National Liberal Party	19 (Note: This figure includes candidate Charles Stanton in Aberdare, who stood as a National Democratic and Labour Party candidate in 1918, but who (and whose party) stood as a National Liberal candidate in this election.)
Liberal Party	11
Independent	1 (Note: Candidate Richard Mathias in Merthyr stood under the badge of 'Independent and Anti-Socialist'; however was supported by the National Liberal Party and local Conservative association, and therefore unopposed by those parties.)
Independent Labour	1 (Note: Candidate Owen Thomas stood in Anglesey.)
National Farmers' Union	1 (Note: Candidate David Johns stood in Carmarthen.)
Total	80

== Analysis ==
The Labour Party had entered the election as Wales' second largest party, and emerged from the election as the largest party in Wales. Future and first Labour Prime Minister of the United Kingdom Ramsay MacDonald entered Parliament in the seat of Aberavon, and held the seat until moving constituencies for the 1929 general election. The Labour Party would win plurality of the vote in every election in Wales up until 2009 elections to European Parliament.

The election saw major gains for the Labour Party, primarily from the Liberal Party and National Liberal Party. The Labour party gained Aberavon, Caernarvonshire, Merthyr, Neath, Pontypridd, Swansea East, Wrexham and Llanelly from the National Liberal Party (when compared to the National Liberal Party's predecessor, the Coalition Liberal Party). Independent candidate Richard Mathias stood under the badge of 'Independent and Anti-Socialist' in the Coalition Liberal/National Liberal held seat of Merthyr; however he was also supported by the National Liberal Party local Conservative association, and therefore unopposed by those parties. However, he was unsuccessful in the seat, leading to Labour gaining the seat from the National Liberal Party in comparison to 1918.

Labour candidate George Hall also gained Aberdare from incumbent National Democratic and Labour Party, overturning the 57.2 per cent majority from 1918. The sitting Member of Parliament Charles Stanton, who was part of the National Democratic and Labour Party, stood as a candidate for the National Liberal Party, as did all other sitting Members of Parliament for the NDLP at this election. He and all the others that did so lost their seats.

The Independent Labour candidate Owen Thomas retained the seat of Anglesey, which he had initially won in 1918 from the Coalition Liberals, therefore being a retention against the National Liberal Party at this election.

The Conservative Party also gained seats in Wales from the Liberal Party, as well as seeing the greatest increase in vote share of any party in Wales. Notably, the Conservative Prime Minister Bonar Law had only been in office since 20 October 1922, barely a month before the election was held. The Conservatives gained Cardiff East from the Liberal Party and Newport from the National Liberal Party. It was the first election after the consolidation of Welsh Provincial Associations of the Conservative and Unionist’s National Union.

The Liberal Party in Wales retained the seats of Montgomeryshire wherein incumbent Member of Parliament David Davies ran unopposed, as well as Merioneth in which Henry Haydn Jones won with a slightly increased vote share. The National Liberal Party under former Prime Minister David Lloyd George, who had resigned as Prime Minister on 19 October 1922 following the Carlton Club meeting and the break up of the Coalition Government, maintained nine of its prior 18 seats in Wales. These were Lloyd George's Welsh seat of Caernarvon Boroughs, as well as Denbigh, Flintshire, Cardiganshire, Carmarthen, Pembrokeshire, (Note: The Member of Parliament for the seat was Lloyd George's son Gwilym Lloyd George.) Brecon and Radnorshire and Swansea West. The National Liberals also retained its seat in the University of Wales constituency. Lloyd George's National Liberals therefore remained the larger of the two liberal parties in Wales and suffered a lower drop in vote share than the Liberal Party, though the Liberal Party under H. H. Asquith increased its seats and vote share across the rest of the United Kingdom.

== County and borough constituency results ==
Below is a table summarising the constituency results of the 1922 general election in Wales, excluding the result in the University of Wales constituency.

Party	Seats					Aggregate votes		
Party	Total	Gains	Losses	Net	Of total (%)	Total	Of total (%)	Change (%)
Labour	18	9	0	▲9	51.4	363,568	40.7	▲9.9
National Liberal	8	0	9	▼9	22.9	230,961	25.9	▼13.3
Conservative	6	2	0	▲2	17.1	190,919	21.4	▲10.1
Liberal	2	0	1	▼1	5.7	74,996	8.4	▼1.3
Independent	0	0	0	Steady	—	15,552	1.7	▲1.2
Independent Labour	1 (Note: Owen Thomas in Anglesey.)	0	0	Steady	2.9	11,929	1.3	▼2.0
Farmers' Union	0	New			—	4,775	0.5	New
Other non-contested	0	0	1	▼1 (Note: National Democratic and Labour Party Members of Parliament stood under the National Liberal Party banner at this election; however, the only former NDLP Member of Parliament for Wales, Charles Stanton, who also stood as a National Liberal candidate, lost Aberdare to Labour.)	—	0	0.0	▼4.6
Total	35			0	100.0	892,700	100.0	0.0
Registered voters, and turnout						1,123,681 (Note: Electorate in contested constituencies. The total electorate was 1,235,579.)	79.4	▲13.5

Popular vote
Labour	40.7%
National Liberal	25.9%
Conservative	21.4%
Liberal	8.4%
Ind. Labour	1.3%
Other	2.2%

Parliament seats
Labour	51.4%
National Liberal	22.9%
Conservative	17.1%
Liberal	5.7%
Ind. Labour	2.9%

== University of Wales result ==
Below is a table summarising the 1922 constituency results for seat of the University of Wales constituency. The National Liberal Party retaining the seat brought the party's total in Wales to nine seats out of the possible 36.

General election 1922: University of Wales
Party	Candidate	Votes	%	±%
National Liberal	Thomas Arthur Lewis	487	39.5	–41.3
Liberal	Ellis Ellis-Griffith	451	35.9	New
Labour	Olive Wheeler	309	24.8	+5.6
Majority		46	3.6	−58.0
Turnout		1,247	87.2	+1.4
National Liberal hold		Swing		

== See also ==
- 1922 United Kingdom general election in England
- 1922 United Kingdom general election in Scotland
- 1922 United Kingdom general election in Northern Ireland
- List of MPs for constituencies in Wales (1922–1923)
