= 1903 North Fermanagh by-election =

UK Parliamentary by-election

The 1903 North Fermanagh by-election was a parliamentary by-election held for the United Kingdom House of Commons constituency of North Fermanagh on 20 March 1903. The vacancy arose because of the resignation of the sitting member Edward Archdale, of the Irish Unionist Alliance.

The by-election was won by Edward Mitchell, a Russellite Unionist.

== Result ==
1903 North Fermanagh by-election
Party	Candidate	Votes	%	±%
Russellite Unionist	Edward Mitchell	2,407	51.6	New
Irish Unionist	James Craig	2,255	48.4	N/A
Majority		152	3.2	N/A
Turnout		4,662	89.4	N/A
Registered electors		5,213		
Russellite Unionist gain from Irish Unionist		Swing	N/A	
