= Dundee in the 1922 general election =

- November 15, 1922

Both parliamentary seats for Dundee
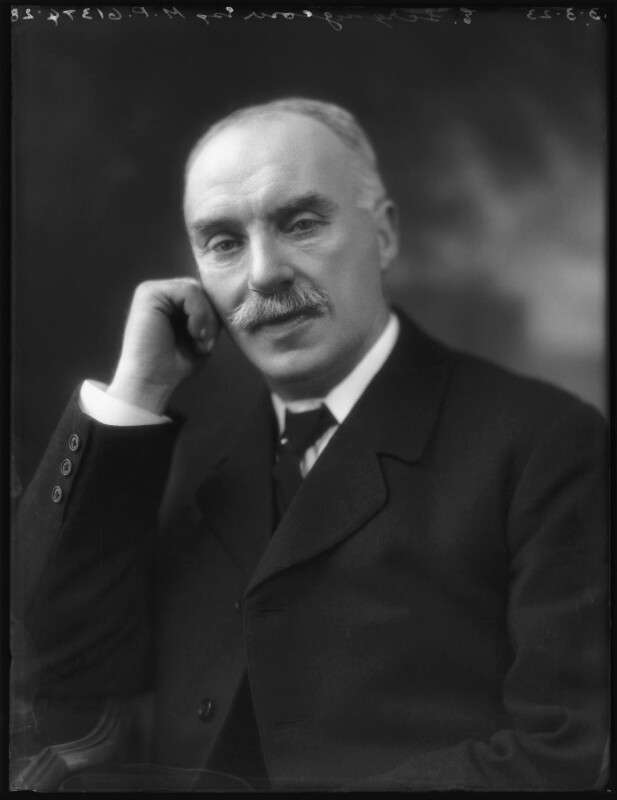

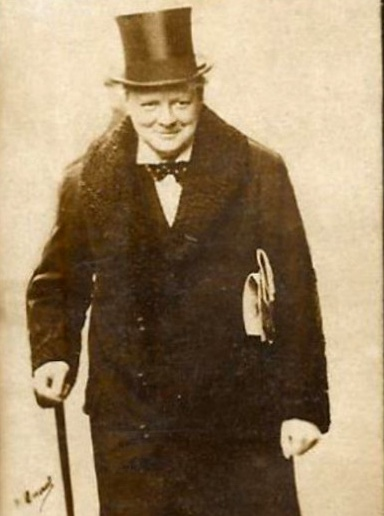

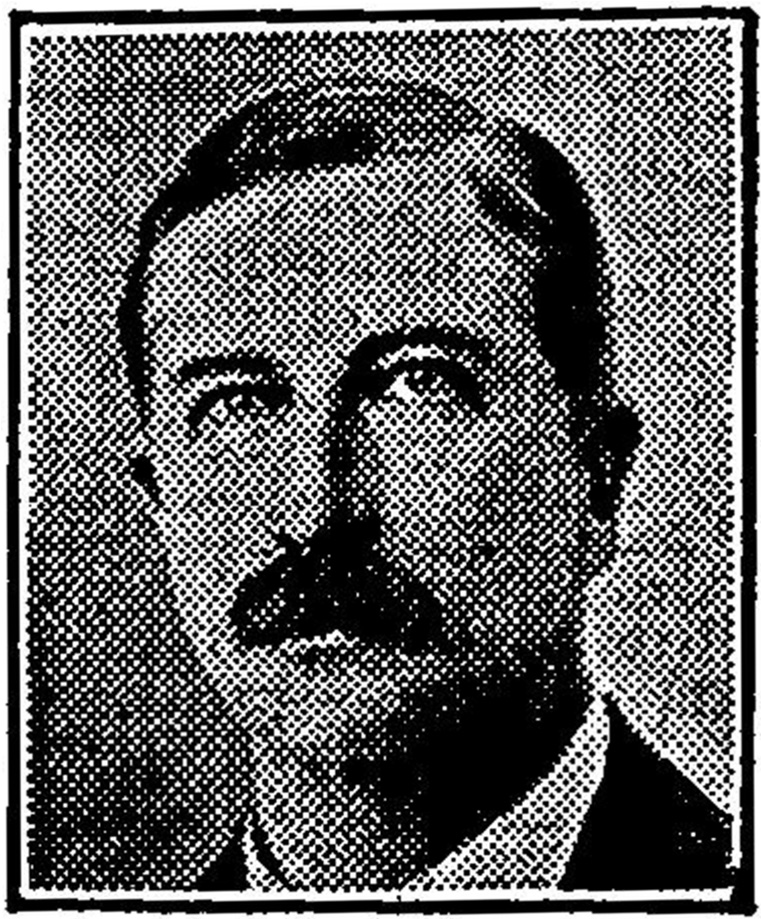

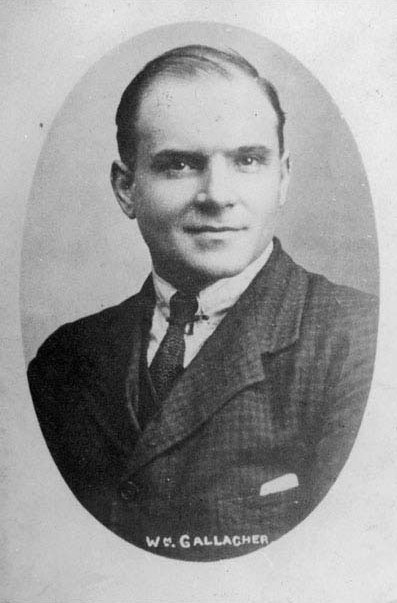
	First party	Second party	Third party
			Nat
Candidate	Edwin Scrymgeour	E.D. Morel	David Johnstone MacDonald
Party	Scottish Prohibition	Labour	National Liberal
Popular vote	32,578	30,292	22,244
Percentage	27.6%	25.6%	18.8%
Swing	▲12.5 pp	▼10.5 pp	N/A
	Fourth party	Fifth party	Sixth party
Candidate	Winston Churchill	Robert Pilkington	Willie Gallacher
Party	National Liberal	Liberal	Communist
Popular vote	20,446	6,681	5,906
Percentage	17.3%	5.7%	5.0%
Swing	▼20.2 pp	N/A	▲5.0 pp

Winston Churchill lost his seat of Dundee in the 1922 general election as a National Liberal follower of David Lloyd George. The election was the only time a challenger standing as a prohibitionist was elected as an MP in the UK.

== Background ==
Dundee was a two member constituency at this point. Leading into 1922 there were two MPs, Churchill and the Labour (but in 1918 Unionist supported) Member of Parliament, Alexander Wilkie, who retired in 1922.

Churchill had held the seat since a by-election in 1908 and had easily won the constituency in the previous general election in 1918, topping the poll in a seat that he had called "a seat for life" in 1908 due to its status as a Liberal safe seat.

In his annual constituency visit the year before Churchill noticed a much more hostile atmosphere than before with his agent worried about the progress of the Labour Party in Dundee and the Lord Provost of Dundee refusing to endorse his big set piece speech.

== Candidates ==
As well as Churchill another National Liberal candidate David McDonald, who owned a local engineering company, ran. He was a popular local candidate who eventually polled higher than Churchill and had been reported as saying that he would have been promised more votes only if he had "dropped Mr Churchill".

Robert Pilkington was nominated to oppose Winston Churchill by the official Liberal party (led by H.H. Asquith) including Garnet Wilson. His campaign fell flat after reassurances from Churchill quietened the local Liberals and in the 1923 he won the seat of Keighley in West Yorkshire.

Edwin Scrymgeour was a preacher and a councillor on Dundee City Council and had stood at every Parliamentary election in Dundee since the 1908 Dundee by-election. In Parliament, on issues other than prohibition, Scrymgeour generally supported the Labour Party. He was a popular figure and around 5,000 voters only voted for him, not giving their second vote to another candidate.

E. D. Morel was a Labour Party candidate with few previous links to Dundee. He was an ex radical Liberal who had formed the Congo Reform Association and had been prominent in the pacifist inclined Union of Democratic Control during the First World War eventually leading to involvement with the Labour Party in 1918.

Willie Gallacher was a trade unionist and very early Communist candidate who would later represent West Fife and be the last Communist MP.

== Campaign ==
The campaign got off to a poor start for Churchill due to an attack of appendicitis and physical weakness.

Churchill was also opposed by both the Dundee newspapers, both owned by the anti-coalition Conservative D C Thomson, and Churchill was so frustrated with the press opposition that he threatened the proprietor with setting up his own paper.

Scrymgeour had attracted the crucial support of John Sime who led the very strong locally based Dundee and District Union of Jute and Flax Workers.

== Defeat for Churchill ==
Despite not being opposed by any Conservative candidate Churchill was defeated by the sole Labour candidate E. D. Morel and Scrymgeour, the only MP ever to be elected for the Scottish Prohibition Party. Morel was considerably to the left of Wilkie, his Labour predecessor.

This was the second election for the Dundee seat held with universal male suffrage and (limited) female suffrage under the Representation of the People Act 1918, Churchill partially blamed this for his defeat saying "The great extensions of the franchise fundamentally altered the political character of Dundee ... and great numbers of very poor women and mill girls, streamed to the poll during the last two hours of the voting." Dundee now had a majority female electorate and this has been seen by later observers as a contributing factor to Churchill's defeat.

Morel regarded Churchill as a warmonger and took pride in having defeated him: "I look upon Churchill as such a personal force for evil that I would take up the fight against him with a whole heart".

== Aftermath ==
Churchill later wrote that he was "without an office, without a seat, without a party, and without an appendix", although he became one of 50 Companions of Honour named in Lloyd George's 1922 Dissolution Honours list.

After the 1923 general election was called, seven Liberal associations asked Churchill to stand as their candidate, and he selected Leicester West, but he did not win the seat. A Labour government led by Ramsay MacDonald took power. Churchill had hoped they would be defeated by a Conservative-Liberal coalition. He strongly opposed the MacDonald government's decision to loan money to Soviet Russia and feared the signing of an Anglo-Soviet Treaty.

On 19 March 1924, alienated by Liberal support for Labour, Churchill stood as an independent anti-socialist "Constitutionalist" candidate in the Westminster Abbey by-election but was defeated. In May, he addressed a Conservative meeting in Liverpool and declared that there was no longer a place for the Liberal Party in British politics. He said that Liberals must back the Conservatives to stop Labour and ensure "the successful defeat of socialism". In July, he agreed with Conservative leader Stanley Baldwin that he would be selected as a Conservative candidate in the next general election, which was held on 29 October. Churchill stood at Epping, but he still described himself as a "Constitutionalist". The Conservatives were victorious and Baldwin formed the new government. Although Churchill had no background in finance or economics, Baldwin appointed him as Chancellor of the Exchequer.

== Local effect ==
This was also a shift in Dundee's political history with one historian saying "1922 marked the final moment of the shift from a position of Whig/Liberal dominance, which had endured since the 1832 Reform Act, to a Labour predominance which was to last most of the twentieth century." Within a Scottish context this was seen as a particularly stark reversal for the National Liberals who supported Lloyd George, with Churchill securing the second highest proportion of the vote for a National Liberal candidate in Scotland in 1918 but receiving the second lowest in 1922.

== Result ==
General election 1922: Dundee (2 seats)
Party	Candidate	Votes	%	±%
Scottish Prohibition	Edwin Scrymgeour	32,578	27.6	+12.5
Labour	E. D. Morel	30,292	25.6	−10.5
National Liberal	David Johnstone MacDonald	22,244	18.8	N/A
National Liberal	Winston Churchill	20,466	17.3	−20.2
Liberal	Robert Pilkington	6,681	5.7	N/A
Communist	Willie Gallacher	5,906	5.0	New
Majority		10,334	8.8	N/A
Majority		8,048	6.8	−14.2
Turnout		118,167	80.5	+33.9
Scottish Prohibition gain from National Liberal		Swing		
Labour hold		Swing		

== See also ==
- 1922 United Kingdom general election in Scotland
