= 1922 United Kingdom general election =

- 15 November 1922

All 615 seats in the House of Commons 308 seats needed for a majority
- Registered: 20,874,456
- Turnout: 14,392,330; 73.0% (▲15.8 pp)
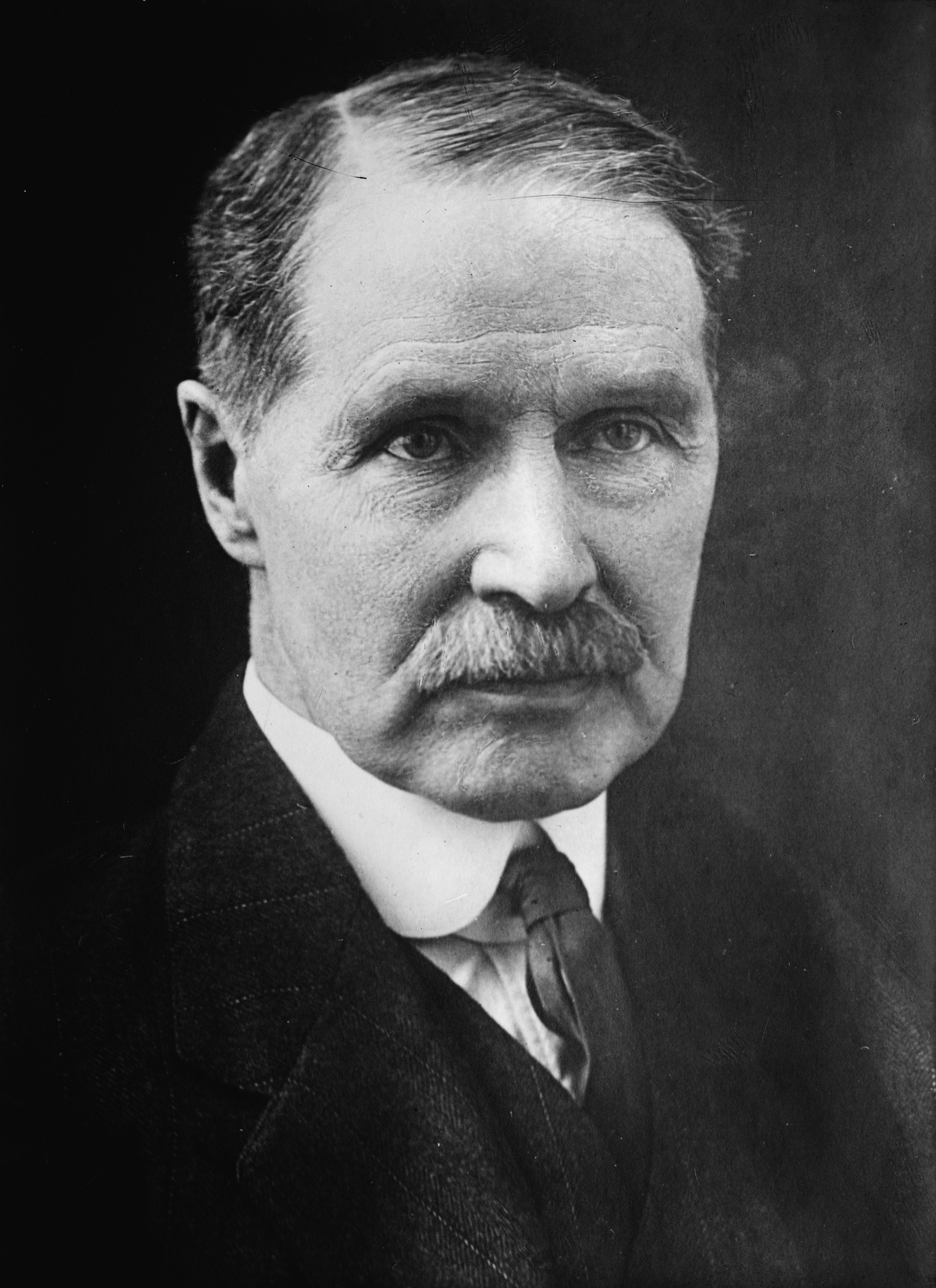

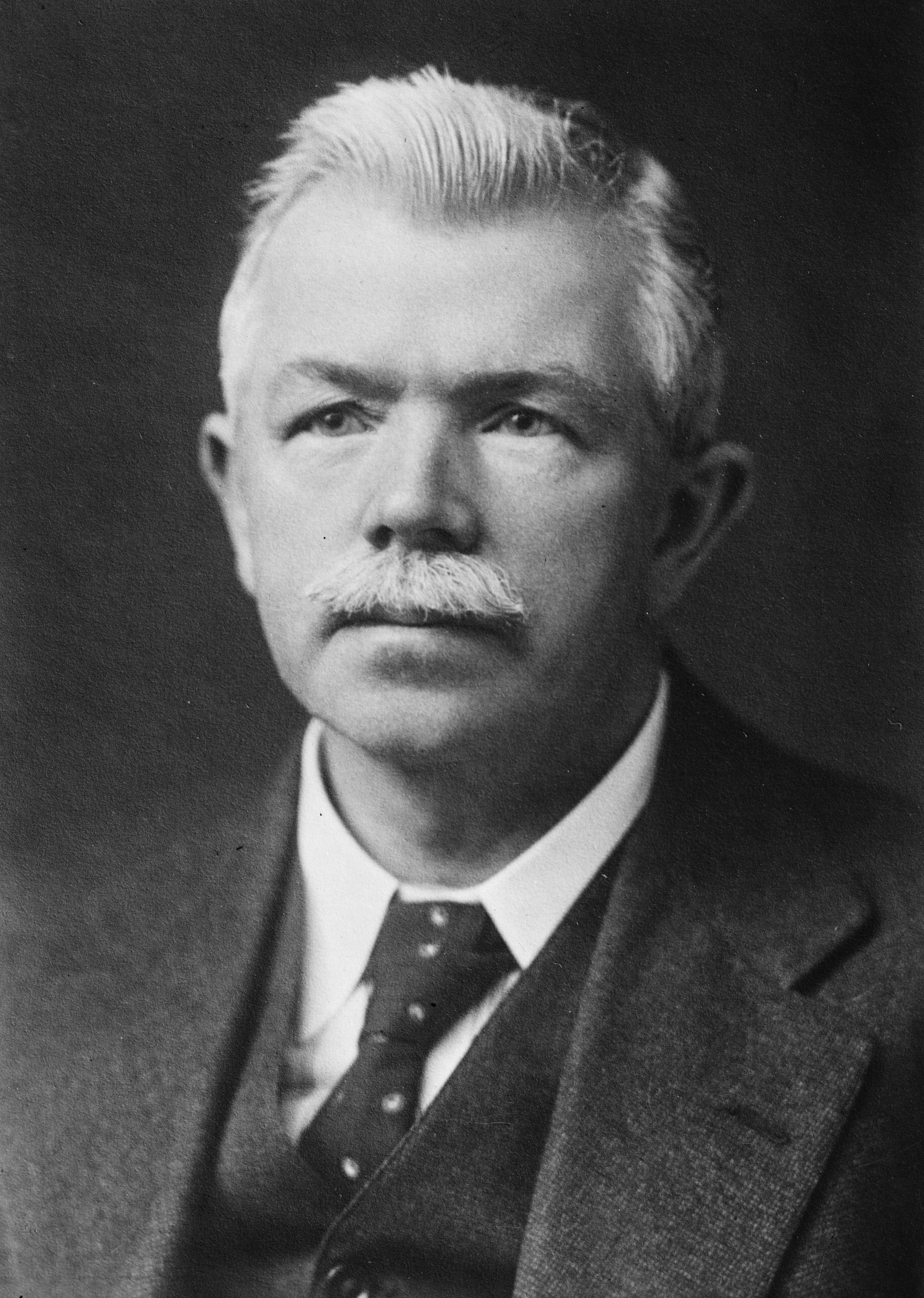

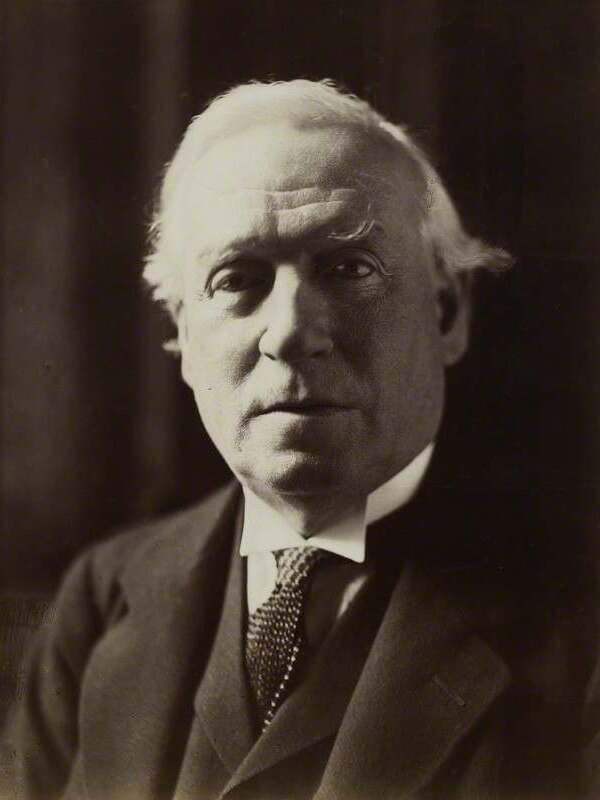

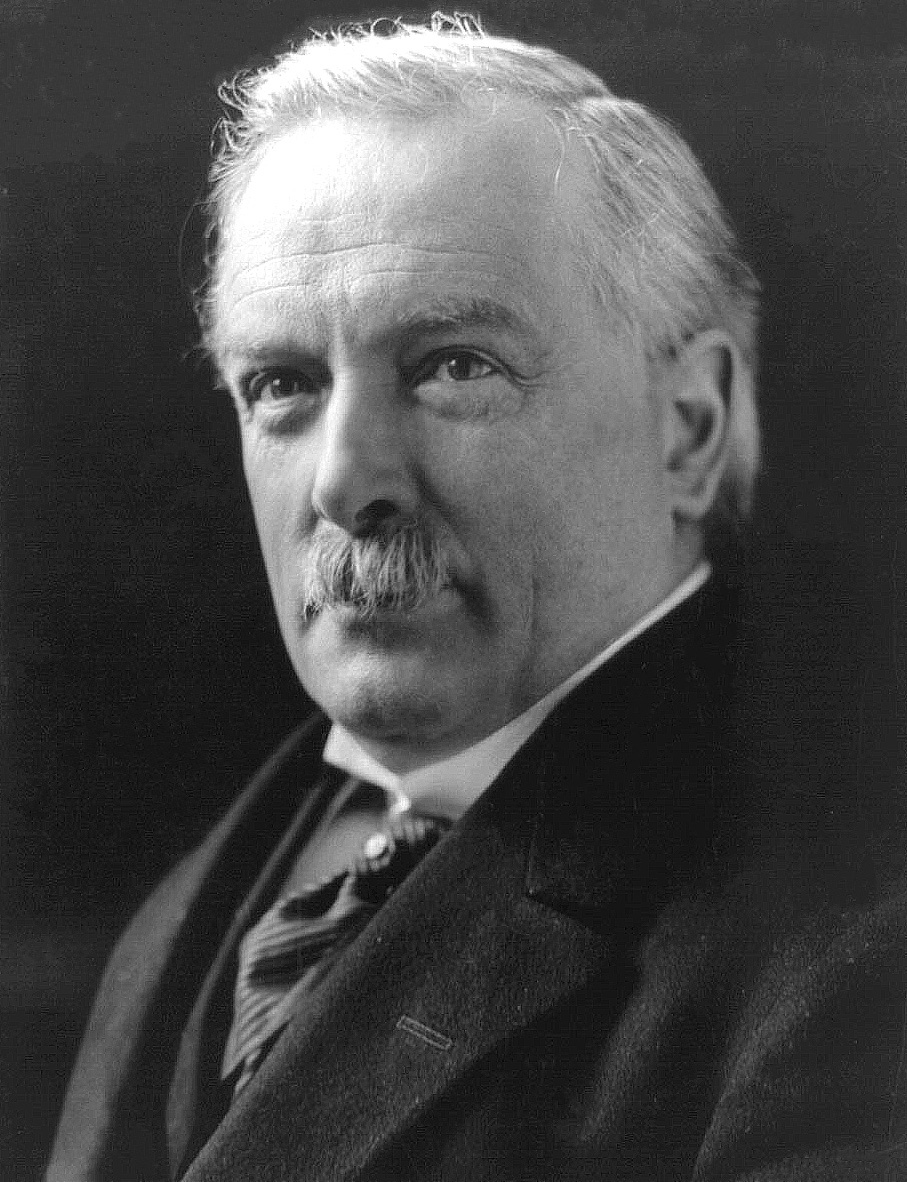
	First party	Second party
Leader	Bonar Law	J. R. Clynes
Party	Conservative	Labour
Leader since	23 October 1922	14 February 1921
Leader's seat	Glasgow Central	Manchester; Platting
Last election	382 seats, 38.7% (Note: Including Conservatives and Unionists not elected under the Coalition Coupon.)	57 seats, 20.8%
Seats won	344	142
Seat change	▼38	▲85
Popular vote	5,502,298	4,237,349
Percentage	38.5%	29.7%
Swing	▼0.2 pp	▲8.9 pp
	Third party	Fourth party
Leader	H. H. Asquith	David Lloyd George
Party	Liberal	National Liberal
Leader since	30 April 1908	7 December 1916
Leader's seat	Paisley	Caernarvon; Boroughs
Last election	36 seats, 13.0%	127 seats, 12.6% (Note: As Coalition Liberals.)
Seats won	62 (Note: Figure includes Speaker of the House of Commons John Henry Whitley in Halifax.)	53
Seat change	▲26	▼74
Popular vote	2,668,143	1,471,317
Percentage	18.9%	9.9%
Swing	▲5.9 pp	▼2.7 pp
- Colours denote the winning party—as shown in § Results

- Composition of the House of Commons following the 1922 general election
Prime Minister before election
Bonar Law
Conservative
Prime Minister after election
Bonar Law
Conservative

A general election was held in the United Kingdom on Wednesday 15 November 1922. It was won by the Conservative Party, led by Prime Minister Bonar Law, which gained an overall majority over the Labour Party, led by J. R. Clynes, and a divided Liberal Party.

This election is considered one of political realignment, with the Liberal Party falling to third-party status. The Conservative Party went on to spend all but eight of the next forty-two years as the largest party in Parliament, and Labour emerged as the main competition to the Conservatives. The Labour Party also won the majority of Welsh seats for the first time, a winning streak that would continue until the 2026 Senedd Election.

The election was the first not to include Southern Ireland, due to the signing of the Anglo-Irish Treaty on 6 December 1921, under which Southern Ireland was to secede from the United Kingdom as a Dominion – the Irish Free State – on 6 December 1922. This reduced the size of the House of Commons by nearly one hundred seats when compared to the previous election.

== Background ==
The Liberal Party had divided into two factions following the ousting of H. H. Asquith as prime minister in December 1916. From then until October 1922 the Conservatives had been in coalition with a Liberal faction (which later became known as the "National Liberals") led by David Lloyd George. Following the Carlton Club meeting, Lloyd George resigned as Prime Minister and Bonar Law formed a Conservative majority government.

Although still leader of the Liberal Party and a frequent public speaker, former prime minister Asquith was no longer a particularly influential figure in the national political debate, and he had played no part in the downfall of the Lloyd George coalition. Most attention was focused on Law and Lloyd George. Asquith's daughter Violet Bonham-Carter, a prominent Liberal Party campaigner, likened the election to a contest between a man with sleeping sickness (Bonar Law) and a man with St Vitus Dance (Lloyd George).

Some of Lloyd George's National Liberals were not opposed by Conservative candidates (e.g., Winston Churchill, who was defeated at Dundee nonetheless), while many leading Conservatives (e.g., former parliamentary leaders Arthur Balfour and Sir Austen Chamberlain, and former Lord Chancellor Lord Birkenhead) were not members of Bonar Law's government, and hoped to hold the balance of power after the election (comparisons were made with the Peelite group—the ousted Conservative front bench of the late 1840s and 1850s); this was not to be, as Bonar Law won an overall majority.

It was the first election at which Labour surpassed the combined strength of both Liberal parties in votes and seats. The election was also notable for Labour in that it saw future prime minister Clement Attlee elected as MP for Limehouse. Labour won the most seats in Wales (which had previously been dominated by the Liberals) for the first time. It continued to achieve holding the largest number of seats in Wales in every national election in Wales until the 2009 European Parliament election in the United Kingdom on a United Kingdom scale election, and the 2026 Senedd election at a Wales scale election.

Some Liberal candidates stood calling for a reunited Liberal Party, while others appear to have backed both Asquith and Lloyd George. Few sources are able to agree on exact numbers, and even in contemporary records held by the two groups, some MPs were claimed for both sides. By one estimate, there were 29 seats where Liberals stood against one another. This is thought to have cost them at least 14 seats, 10 of them to Labour, so in theory a reunited Liberal Party would have been much closer to, and perhaps even ahead of, Labour in terms of seats. However, in reality the two factions were on poor terms, and Lloyd George was still hoping for a renewed coalition with the Conservatives.

Neither of the leaders of the two main parties succeeded in enjoying their achievement in the election for very long; within less than a month of the election, Clynes was defeated in a leadership challenge by former Labour leader Ramsay MacDonald, while Bonar Law would only last a little over seven months as prime minister before being forced to step down due to a terminal illness, resulting in Stanley Baldwin succeeding him as both party leader and prime minister. As a result, Bonar Law was the shortest-serving UK prime minister of the twentieth century. Parliament was dissolved on 26 October 1923; Bonar Law died four days later.

== Party platforms ==
The Conservative Party offered continuity to the electorate. Bonar Law's election address stated:

The crying need of the nation have this moment ... Is that we should have tranquility and stability both at home and abroad so that the free scope should be given to the initiative and enterprise of our own citizens, for it is in that way, far more than by any action of the Government that we can hope to recover from the economic and social results of the war.

The Labour Party proposed to nationalise the mines and railways, to impose a levy on financial capital, and to revise the peace treaties. It promised a higher standard of living for workers, higher wages, and better housing.

== Results ==
=== Summary of seats returned ===
Party	Leader	MPs		Aggregate votes	
Party	Leader		Of total		Of total (Note: Adjusted for multi-member constituencies.)
Conservative and Unionist Party	Bonar Law	344	55.9%	5,502,298	38.5%
Conservative Party (Note: Results for England and Wales.)	Bonar Law	318	51.7%	5,014,930	35.4%
Unionist Party	George Younger	15	2.4%	379,396	2.6%
Ulster Unionist Party	James Craig	11	1.8%	107,972	0.5%
Labour Party	J. R. Clynes	142	23.1%	4,237,349	29.7%
Labour Party	J. R. Clynes	138	22.4%	4,110,940	28.8%
Co-operative Party	—N/a	4	0.7%	126,409	0.9%
Liberal Party	H. H. Asquith	62	10.1%	2,668,143	18.9%
National Liberal Party	David Lloyd George	53	8.6%	1,471,317	9.9%
Independent	—N/a	3	0.5%	139,644	1.0%
Independent Conservative	—N/a	3	0.5%	100,020	0.7%
Nationalist Party	Joseph Devlin	2	0.3%	90,053	0.3%
Communist Party of Great Britain	Albert Inkpin	1	0.2%	33,637	0.2%
Scottish Prohibition Party	Edwin Scrymgeour	1	0.2%	32,578	0.1%
Independent Labour	—N/a	1	0.2%	18,419	0.1%
Constitutionalist	—N/a	1	0.2%	16,662	0.1%
Independent Liberal	—N/a	1	0.2%	13,197	0.1%
Irish Nationalist	T. P. O'Connor	1	0.2%	12,614	0.1%

=== Full Results ===

Results of the November 1922 general election to the House of Commons of the United Kingdom
Party	Leader	Candidates	MPs					Aggregate votes		
Party	Leader	Candidates	Total	Gains	Losses	Net	Of total (%)	Total	Of total (%) (Note: Adjusted for multi-member constituencies.)	Change (%)
Conservative (Note: Figure includes the Unionist Party and the Ulster Unionist Party under their nation affiliations with the Conservative Party.)	Bonar; Law	482	344	44	82	▼38	55.9	5,502,298	38.5	▼0.2
Labour (Total)	J. R. Clynes	414	142	92	7	▲85	23.1	4,237,349	29.7	▲8.9 (Note: Includes the increase of the Co-operative Party standing with Labour compared to the last election.)
Labour	J. R. Clynes	403	138	88	6	▲82	22.4	4,110,940	28.8	▲8.0
Co-operative; Party	—N/a	11	4	4	1	▲3	0.7	126,409	0.9	▲0.3
Liberal	H. H. Asquith	334	62	46	20	▲26	10.1	2,668,143	18.9	▲5.9
National Liberal (Note: The National Liberal Party was formed by Lloyd George's Coalition Liberals after leaving the Coalition Government. The party's net seat change is compared with the Coalition Liberals' number of seats and vote share after the 1918 election.)	David Lloyd; George	151	53	8	82	▼74	8.6	1,471,317	9.9	▼2.7
Independent	—N/a	14	3	3	3 (Note: Includes loss for Coalition Independent.)	Steady	0.5	139,644	1.0	▲0.4
Independent; Conservative	—N/a	18	3	3	0	▲3	0.5	100,020	0.7	▲0.6
Nationalist (Note: Comparisons made to Irish Parliamentary Party result in 1918.)	Joseph; Devlin	2	2	0	5	▼5	0.3	90,053	0.3	▼1.9
Communist	Albert; Inkpin	5	1	New		▲1	0.2	33,637	0.2	New
Scottish; Prohibition	Edwin; Scrymgeour	1	1	1	0	▲1	0.2	32,578	0.1	Steady
Independent; Labour	—N/a	4	1	0	1	▼1	0.2	18,419	0.1	▼0.9
Constitutionalist	—N/a	1	1	New		▲1	0.2	16,662	0.1	New
Farmer's; Union	Harry; German	3	0	0	0	Steady	—	16,267	0.1	▼0.1
Health	—N/a	1	0	0	0	Steady	—	14,193	0.0	▲0.1
Independent; Liberal	—N/a	3	1	1	1	Steady	0.2	13,197	0.1	▼0.1
Irish; Nationalist	T. P. O'Connor	2	1	Independent from IPP		Steady	0.2	12,614	0.1	—N/a
Independent; Unionist	—N/a	1	0	0	2	▼2	—	7,214	0.1	▼0.4
Agriculturalist	—N/a	1	0	0	0	Steady	—	5,243	0.0	Steady
Anti- Conservative	—N/a	1	0	New			—	4,964	0.0	New
Independent; Communist	—N/a	1	0	New			—	4,027	0.0	New
Agriculturalist	—N/a	1	0	New			—	4,021	0.0	New
Anti-Parliamentary Communist	Guy; Aldred	1	0	New			—	470	0.0	New
Other non-contested		0	0	—N/a		▼89 (Note: 73 Sinn Féin seats, 9 Coalition NDP seats, 4 Coalition Labour seats, 2 National Party seats, and 1 National Socialist Party seat.)	—	0	0.0	—N/a
Total		1,441	615			▼92	100.0	14,392,330	100.0	0.0
Registered voters, and turnout								20,874,456 (Note: Including the electorate in uncontested constituencies.)	73.0 (Note: Adjusted for multi-member constituencies.)	▲15.8

=== Popular vote ===
Popular vote
Conservative	38.5%
Labour	29.7%
Liberal	18.9%
National Liberal	9.9%
Others	3.0%

=== Parliament seats ===
Parliament seats
Conservative	55.9%
Labour	23.1%
Liberal	10.1%
National Liberal	8.6%
Others	2.3%

== Transfers of seats ==
- All comparisons are with the 1918 election.
  - In some cases the change is due to the MP defecting to the gaining party. Such circumstances are marked with a *.
  - In other circumstances the change is due to the seat having been won by the gaining party in a by-election in the intervening years, and then retained in 1922. Such circumstances are marked with a †.

From	To	No.	Seats
Labour	Labour (HOLD)	51	Abertillery, Ayrshire South, Bedwellty, Bishop Auckland, Broxtowe, Burnley, Burslem, Caerphilly, Chester-le-Street, Deptford, Derby (one of two), Dundee (one of two), Ebbw Vale, Edinburgh Central, Fife West, Forest of Dean, Gorton, Govan, Gower, Hamilton, Hemsworth, Holland with Boston, Houghton-le-Spring, Ince, Kingswinford, Leeds South East, Leek, Morpeth, Nelson and Colne, Newton, Normanton, Nottingham West, Ogmore, Plaistow, Platting, Pontypool, Preston (one of two), Rhondda East, Rhondda West, Rother Valley, Rothwell, St Helens, Salford North, Smethwick, Wednesbury, Wentworth, West Bromwich, Westhoughton, Wigan, Woolwich East, Workington
Labour	Liberal	1	Mansfield
Labour	National Liberal	1	Wellingborough
Labour	Conservative	4	Barnard Castle, Bolton (one of two), Clitheroe, Ormskirk
Coalition Labour	Labour	2	Cannock, Gorbals
Coalition Labour	Independent	1	Norwich (one of two)*
Coalition Labour	Conservative	1	Stockport (one of two)†
Independent Labour	Independent Labour	1	Anglesey
Independent Labour	Labour	1	Aberdeen North*
Coalition National Democratic	Labour	8	Aberdare, Bradford East, Don Valley, East Ham South, Hanley, Leicester West, Wallsend, Walthamstow West
Coalition National Democratic	Conservative	1	Duddeston
National Socialist Party	Labour	1	Silvertown*
Co-operative Party	Conservative	1	Kettering
Sinn Féin	Nationalist	1	Fermanagh and Tyrone (one of two) (replaced Fermanagh South)
Sinn Féin	abolished	72	Londonderry City, Tyrone NW, N Donegal, S Donegal, W Donegal, N Monaghan, S Monaghan, E Cavan, W Cavan, Connemara, E Galway, N Galway, S Galway, Co Leitrim, N Roscommon, S Roscommon, N Sligo, S Sligo, E Mayo, N Mayo, S Mayo, W Mayo, Co Longford, Louth, King's County, Queen's County, Co Westmeath, Co Carlow, N Meath, S Meath, Dublin College Green, Dublin Harbour, Dublin St Patrick's, Dublin St Stephen's Green, N Dublin, S Dublin, National University of Ireland, Dublin Clontarf, Dublin Pembroke, Dublin St James's, Dublin St Michan's, E Wicklow, W Wicklow, N Kildare, S Kildare, N Kilkenny, S Kilkenny, N Wexford, S Wexford, E Clare, W Clare, E Tipperary, Mid Tipperary, N Tipperary, S Tipperary, Limerick City, E Limerick, W Limerick, E Kerry, N Kerry, S Kerry, W Kerry, Cork (both seats), E Cork, Mid Cork, N Cork, NE Cork, S Cork, SE Cork, W Cork, County Waterford
Nationalist	Nationalist	2	Fermanagh and Tyrone (one of two) (replaced Tyrone North-East)
Nationalist	abolished	3	Armagh South, Belfast Falls, Down South
Irish Parliamentary	Irish Nationalist	1	Liverpool Scotland
Irish Parliamentary	abolished	2	East Donegal, Waterford City
Liberal	Labour	9	Stirling and Falkirk, Midlothian South & Peebles, Derbyshire North East, Spennymoor, Seaham, Consett, Leigh, Bermondsey West, Whitechapel and St George's
Liberal	Liberal (HOLD)	15	Greenock, Paisley, Leith, Edinburgh East, Chesterfield, Belper, Derbyshire West, Kingston upon Hull South West, Lambeth North, Wolverhampton East, Middlesbrough West, Penistone, Merionethshire, Montgomeryshire, South Molton
Liberal	National Liberal	6	Camborne, Western Isles, Kinross and West Perthshire*, Loughborough, Norwich* (one of two), Berwick-upon-Tweed
Liberal	Conservative	5	Portsmouth Central, Stourbridge, Middlesbrough East, Cardiff East, Norfolk South
National Liberal	Scottish Prohibition	1	Dundee (one of two)
National Liberal	Labour	37	Dunfermline Burghs, Glasgow Cathcart, Renfrewshire East, Renfrewshire West, Rutherglen, Dumbarton Burghs, Glasgow Bridgeton, Crewe, Carlisle, Clay Cross, Ilkeston, Blaydon, Jarrow, Poplar South, Stepney Limehouse, Newcastle upon Tyne East, Newcastle upon Tyne West, Pontefract, Sheffield Hillsborough, Sheffield Attercliffe, Sheffield Brightside, Leeds South, Doncaster, Barnsley, Batley and Morley, Colne Valley, Wrexham, Llanelli, Carnarvonshire, Aberavon, Merthyr, Neath, Pontypridd†, Swansea East, Wansbeck, Cornwall North, Battersea North
National Liberal	Liberal	13	Orkney and Shetland, East Aberdeenshire & Kincardineshire, Aberdeenshire West and Kincardine, Galloway, South Shields, Bethnal Green North-East, Leeds West*, Huddersfield, Spen Valley, Combined Scottish Universities (one of three)*, Eye*, Banff, Kilmarnock
National Liberal	National Liberal (HOLD)	45	Combined English Universities (one of two), University of Wales, Caithness and Sutherland, Inverness, Ross and Cromarty, Moray and Nairn, Montrose Burghs, Argyll, Partick, Kirkcaldy Burghs, Roxburgh & Selkirk, Berwick & Haddington, Stockport (one of two), Stockton-on-Tees, Romford, Bristol East, Bristol North, Bristol South, Blackburn (one of two), Bolton (one of two), Heywood and Radcliffe, Middleton & Prestwich, Oldham (one of two), Stretford, Leicester East, Camberwell North-West, Hackney Central, Shoreditch, Southwark Central, Southwark North, Southwark South East, Northampton, Lichfield, Stoke, Shipley, Denbigh, Flintshire, Cardiganshire, Carmarthen, Pembrokeshire, Carnarvon, Brecon and Radnor, Swansea West, Norfolk South West, Sheffield Park
National Liberal	Speaker	1	Halifax*
National Liberal	Conservative	28	St Ives, Perth, Bedford, Luton, Cambridgeshire, Isle of Ely, Derbyshire South, Barnstaple, Sunderland (one of two), Leyton East, East Ham North, Stroud, Thornbury, Southampton (both seats), Buckrose, Bosworth, Kennington, Peckham, Banbury, The Wrekin, Lowestoft, Sudbury, Pudsey and Otley, Leeds North, Leeds Central, Newport (Monmouthshire)†, Saffron Walden
National Liberal	Ind. Conservative	1	Dorset East
National Liberal	Constitutionalist	1	Dartford
National Liberal	Independent	1	Mossley*
Independent	Conservative	1	Hackney South†
Ind. Unionist	Conservative	1	Sowerby
Coalition Independent	Labour	1	Norfolk North
Speaker	Liberal	1	Penrith and Cockermouth
Independent Liberal	Labour	1	Newcastle-under-Lyme*
Conservative	Communist	1	Motherwell
Conservative	Labour	32	Clackmannan and Eastern Stirlingshire, Stirlingshire West, Lanarkshire North, Glasgow Maryhill, Glasgow Camlachie, Bothwell†, Coatbridge, Glasgow Springburn, Glasgow Tradeston, Glasgow St. Rollox, Glasgow Shettleston, Linlithgow, Durham, Sedgefield, Gateshead, Stratford, Accrington, Eccles, Farnworth, Manchester Ardwick, Oldham (one of two), Rochdale, Bow and Bromley, Camberwell North†, Edmonton, Tottenham North, Newcastle upon Tyne Central, Elland, Bradford Central, Keighley, Dewsbury, Whitehaven
Conservative	Liberal	30	Aberdeen and Kincardine Central†, Forfarshire, Fife East, Edinburgh West, Dumfriesshire, Bedfordshire Mid, Birkenhead East, Derby (one of two), Tavistock, Dorset North, The Hartlepools, Harwich, Isle of Wight, Worcester, Holderness, Kingston upon Hull Central†, Preston (one of two), Bootle, Grantham, Horncastle, Bethnal Green South-West, Great Yarmouth, Nottingham Central, Oxford, Taunton, Chippenham, Westbury, Bradford South, Louth†, Bodmin†
Conservative	Independent Liberal	1	Cambridge University (one of two)
Conservative	Independent	1	Harrow*
Conservative	Conservative (HOLD)	289	Cambridge University (one of two), Combined English Universities (one of two), Oxford University (both seats), London University, Combined Scottish Universities (two of three), Aberdeen South, Ayr Burghs, Ayrshire N & Bute, Glasgow Central, Hillhead, Pollok, Kelvingrove, Dunbartonshire, Lanark, Edinburgh South, Midlothian N, Edinburgh North, Abingdon, Newbury, Reading, Windsor, Aylesbury, Buckingham, Wycombe, Cambridge, Huntingdonshire, Altrincham, Birkenhead West, Chester, Eddisbury, Knutsford, Macclesfield, Northwich, Stalybridge and Hyde, Wallasey, Wirral, Penryn and Falmouth, Cumberland North, Westmorland, High Peak, Exeter, Honiton, Plymouth Devonport, Plymouth Drake, Plymouth Sutton, Tiverton, Torquay, Totnes, Dorset South, Dorset West, Darlington, Sunderland (one of two), Chelmsford, Colchester, Epping, Essex SE, Ilford, Maldon, Leyton West, Southend, Walthamstow E, Upton, Bristol Central, Bristol West, Cheltenham, Cirencester and Tewkesbury, Gloucester, Aldershot, Basingstoke, Fareham, New Forest & Christchurch, Petersfield, Portsmouth North, Portsmouth South, Winchester, Hereford, Leominster, Bewdley, Dudley, Evesham, Kidderminster, Hitchin, St Albans, Watford, Hemel Hempstead, Ealing, Hornsey, Twickenham, Wood Green, Finchley, Brentford and Chiswick, Hendon, Spelthorne, Uxbridge, Willesden East, Acton, Enfield, Tottenham South, Willesden West, Howdenshire, Kingston upon Hull East, Kingston upon Hull North West, Ashford, Bromley, Canterbury, Chatham, Chislehurst, Dover, Faversham, Gillingham, Gravesend, Hythe, Isle of Thanet, Maidstone, Sevenoaks, Tonbridge, Barrow-in-Furness, Blackburn (one of two), Blackpool, Chorley, Darwen, Fylde, Lancaster, Lonsdale, Rossendale, Ashton-under-Lyne, Bury, Manchester Blackley, Manchester Clayton, Manchester Exchange, Hulme, Moss Side, Rusholme, Withington, Royton, Salford South, Salford West, E Toxteth, Edge Hill, Everton, Liverpool Exchange, Fairfield, Kirkdale, Walton, Wavertree, West Derby, West Toxteth, Southport, Warrington, Waterloo, Widnes, Harborough, Leicester South, Melton, Brigg, Gainsborough, Grimsby, Lincoln, Rutland and Stamford, Balham and Tooting, Chelsea, Clapham, Dulwich, Fulham East, Hampstead, Holborn, Lewisham East, Lewisham West, Kensington South, Hackney North, Brixton, Fulham West, Hammersmith South, Islington North, Kensington North, Battersea South, Greenwich, Islington East, Hammersmith North, Finsbury, Islington South, Islington West, City of London (both seats), Mile End, Stoke Newington, Norwood, Paddington North, Paddington South, Putney, Rotherhithe, St Marylebone, St Pancras North, St Pancras South East, St Pancras South West, Streatham, Wandsworth Central, Westminster Abbey, Woolwich West, King's Lynn, Norfolk East, Daventry, Peterborough, Hexham, Newcastle upon Tyne North, Tynemouth, Bassetlaw, Nottingham South, Nottingham East, Rushcliffe, Newark, Henley, Ludlow, Oswestry, Shrewsbury, Bath, Bridgwater, Frome, Wells, Weston-super-Mare, Yeovil, Burton, Stafford, Stone, Tamworth, Bilston, Wolverhampton West, Bury St Edmunds, Ipswich, Woodbridge, Chertsey, Croydon North, Croydon South, Epsom, Farnham, Guildford, Kingston upon Thames, Mitcham, Reigate, Surrey East, Wimbledon, Brighton (both seats), Chichester, East Grinstead, Eastbourne, Hastings, Horsham and Worthing, Lewes, Rye, Nuneaton, Coventry, Aston, Deritend, Erdington, King's Norton, Ladywood, Yardley, Sparkbrook, Birmingham West, Edgbaston, Handsworth, Moseley, Rugby, Warwick and Leamington, Devizes, Salisbury, Swindon, York, Cleveland, Richmond (Yorks), Scarborough and Whitby, Thirsk and Malton, Barkston Ash, Ripon, Ecclesall, Hallam, Skipton, Leeds North East, Sheffield Central, Bradford North, Wakefield, Rotherham, Monmouth, Llandaff & Barry, Cardiff C, Cardiff S
Conservative	Ind. Conservative	2	Westminster St George's, Richmond (Surrey)
Labour Unionist (Note: The Ulster Unionist Labour Association was an adjunctive party of the Irish Unionist Party.)	abolished	3	Shankill, St Anne's, Victoria
Irish Unionist	UUP	11	Antrim (both seats) (replaced South Antrim and Antrim Mid), Armagh (replaced Armagh North), Belfast East (replaced Belfast Pottinger), Belfast North (replaced Belfast Duncairn), Belfast South (replaced Belfast Ormeau), Belfast West (replaced Belfast Woodvale), Down (both seats) (replaced Down East and Down North), Londonderry (replaced Londonderry North), Queen's University of Belfast.
Irish Unionist	abolished	11	Antrim East, Antrim North, Armagh Mid, Belfast Cromac, Down Mid, Down West, Londonderry South, Fermanagh North, Tyrone South, Dublin Rathmines, Dublin University (one of two)
Ind. Unionist	abolished	1	Dublin University (one of two)
National	Liberal	1	Walsall
National	Conservative	1	Bournemouth*
Independent	Conservative	1	Hertford†^{1}

†^{1} MP elected as an Anti-Waste League candidate at a 1921 by-election, but moved to the Conservatives for the 1922 election

== See also ==
- List of MPs elected in the 1922 United Kingdom general election
- 1922 United Kingdom general election in England
- 1922 United Kingdom general election in Scotland
- 1922 United Kingdom general election in Wales
- 1922 United Kingdom general election in Northern Ireland
