= Edward Mitchell (Irish politician) =

Edward Mitchell (1859–1921) was an Irish Russellite Unionist politician.

He defeated James Craig to be elected as the Member of Parliament (MP) for North Fermanagh at a by-election on 20 March 1903 after the resignation of the Unionist MP Edward Archdale.

At the next general election, in January 1906 the Russellites did not manage to hold their early by-election gains. They won one new seat, but lost to mainstream Unionists both of the seats gained at by-elections, including Mitchell's. He did not stand again.

Parliament of the United Kingdom
Preceded by Edward Archdale	Member of Parliament for North Fermanagh; 1903 – 1906	Succeeded by Godfrey Fetherstonhaugh
