= Richard Dane =

Richard Martin Dane (4 December 1852 – 22 March 1903) was an Irish Unionist politician who later became a judge.

He was elected at the 1892 general election as Member of Parliament for North Fermanagh, winning the seat which had been held until the election by the Nationalist MP Willie Redmond. Redmond had sided with the Parnellite minority when the Irish Parliamentary Party split in 1891, and in 1892 he won a seat in East Clare; Dane's victory in North Fermanagh over an Anti-Parnellite Irish National Federation candidate made him the first in a series of Unionists who represented the constituency until its abolition in 1918.

Dane was re-elected in 1895, defeating an independent Liberal candidate, and held the seat until he left the House of Commons in 1898 to become a county court judge.

Parliament of the United Kingdom
Preceded by Willie Redmond	Member of Parliament for North Fermanagh; 1892 – 1898	Succeeded by Edward Archdale
