= North Fermanagh =

UK parliamentary constituency in Ireland, 1885–1922

- Former county constituency for the House of Commons
- County: County Fermanagh

1885–1922
- Seats: 1
- Created from: County Fermanagh; Enniskillen
- Replaced by: Fermanagh and Tyrone

North Fermanagh was a parliament constituency in Ireland which returned one Member of Parliament to the House of Commons of the United Kingdom on the electoral system of first past the post from 1885 to 1922.

== Politics ==
The constituency was a marginal one compared to many other seats in what became Northern Ireland. The Unionist candidate won in 1918, but Sinn Féin only polled 532 fewer votes.

== Boundaries ==
From 1801 to 1885, County Fermanagh returned two MPs to the House of Commons of the United Kingdom sitting at the Palace of Westminster, with separate representation for the parliamentary borough of Enniskillen. Under the Redistribution of Seats Act 1885, the parliamentary county was divided into the divisions of North Fermanagh and South Fermanagh. Enniskillen ceased to exist as a parliamentary borough.

North Fermanagh was defined as:

In County Fermanagh, the baronies of Lurg, Magheraboy, and Tirkennedy.

It was not affected by the Redistribution of Seats (Ireland) Act 1918. At the 1918 general election, Sinn Féin contested on an election manifesto with an abstentionist pledge that instead of taking its seats at Westminster, it would establish an assembly in Dublin. All MPs elected to Irish seats were invited to participate in the First Dáil convened in January 1919, but no members outside of Sinn Féin did so.

The Government of Ireland Act 1920 established the Parliament of Northern Ireland, which came into operation in 1921. The representation of Northern Ireland at Westminster was reduced from 30 MPs to 13 MPs, taking effect at the 1922 United Kingdom general election. At Westminster, North Fermanagh, South Fermanagh, North-East Tyrone, North-West Tyrone and South Tyrone were combined to form the two-member county constituency of Fermanagh and Tyrone. An eight-seat constituency of Fermanagh and Tyrone was created for the House of Commons of Northern Ireland, which formed the basis in republican theory for representation in the Second Dáil.

== Members of Parliament ==
Election	MP	Party
1885	Willie Redmond (Note: Redmond remained with the Parnellite Irish National League on the split of the Irish Parliamentary Party in 1891. He was elected for East Clare in 1892.)	Irish National League
1886	Willie Redmond	Irish National League
1892	Richard Dane	Irish Unionist
1895	Richard Dane	Irish Unionist
1898 b	Edward Archdale	Irish Unionist
1900	Edward Archdale	Irish Unionist
1903 b	Edward Mitchell	Russellite Unionist
1906	Godfrey Fetherstonhaugh	Irish Unionist
Jan 1910	Godfrey Fetherstonhaugh	Irish Unionist
Dec 1910	Godfrey Fetherstonhaugh	Irish Unionist
1916 b	Edward Archdale	Irish Unionist
1918	Edward Archdale	Irish Unionist
1922	constituency abolished	

== Elections ==
=== Elections in the 1880s ===
1885 general election: North Fermanagh
Party	Candidate	Votes	%	±%
Irish Parliamentary	Willie Redmond	3,255	53.6	
Irish Conservative	John Caldwell Bloomfield	2,822	46.4	
Majority		433	7.2	
Turnout		6,077	90.9	
Registered electors		6,687		
Irish Parliamentary win (new seat)				

1886 general election: North Fermanagh
Party	Candidate	Votes	%	±%
Irish Parliamentary	Willie Redmond	3,128	52.2	−1.4
Irish Conservative	William Humphrys Archdale	2,862	47.8	+1.4
Majority		266	4.4	−2.8
Turnout		5,990	89.6	−1.3
Registered electors		6,687		
Irish Parliamentary hold		Swing	−1.4	

=== Elections in the 1890s ===
1892 general election: North Fermanagh
Party	Candidate	Votes	%	±%
Irish Unionist	Richard Dane	2,879	52.9	+5.1
Irish National Federation	Jeremiah Jordan	2,562	47.1	−5.1
Majority		317	5.8	N/A
Turnout		5,441	91.6	+2.0
Registered electors		5,937		
Irish Unionist gain from Irish Parliamentary		Swing	+5.1	

1895 general election: North Fermanagh
Party	Candidate	Votes	%	±%
Irish Unionist	Richard Dane	2,782	53.6	+0.7
Independent Liberal	George Reginald Leeper	2,406	46.4	New
Majority		376	7.2	+1.4
Turnout		5,188	92.1	+0.5
Registered electors		5,632		
Irish Unionist hold		Swing		

1898 by-election: North Fermanagh
Party	Candidate	Votes	%	±%
Irish Unionist	Edward Archdale	2,568	55.1	+1.5
Ind. Unionist	Edward Charles Thompson	2,091	44.9	New
Majority		477	10.2	+3.0
Turnout		4,659	81.2	−10.9
Registered electors		5,735		
Irish Unionist hold		Swing		

=== Elections in the 1900s ===
1900 general election: North Fermanagh
Party	Candidate	Votes	%	±%
Irish Unionist	Edward Archdale	Unopposed		
Irish Unionist hold				

1903 by-election: North Fermanagh
Party	Candidate	Votes	%	±%
Russellite Unionist	Edward Mitchell	2,407	51.6	New
Irish Unionist	James Craig	2,255	48.4	N/A
Majority		152	3.2	N/A
Turnout		4,662	89.4	N/A
Registered electors		5,213		
Russellite Unionist gain from Irish Unionist		Swing	N/A	

1906 general election: North Fermanagh
Party	Candidate	Votes	%	±%
Irish Unionist	Godfrey Fetherstonhaugh	2,419	50.9	N/A
Russellite Unionist	Edward Mitchell	2,331	49.1	N/A
Majority		88	1.8	N/A
Turnout		4,750	93.4	N/A
Registered electors		5,083		
Irish Unionist gain from Russellite Unionist		Swing	N/A	

=== Elections in the 1910s ===
January 1910 general election: North Fermanagh
Party	Candidate	Votes	%	±%
Irish Unionist	Godfrey Fetherstonhaugh	2,474	53.8	+2.9
Liberal	Samuel Peter Kerr	2,124	46.2	New
Majority		350	7.6	+5.8
Turnout		4,598	93.9	+0.5
Registered electors		4,895		
Irish Unionist hold		Swing		

December 1910 general election: North Fermanagh
Party	Candidate	Votes	%	±%
Irish Unionist	Godfrey Fetherstonhaugh	2,402	53.9	+0.1
Liberal	Arthur Percival Tod Collum	2,055	46.1	−0.1
Majority		347	7.8	+0.2
Turnout		4,457	91.1	−2.8
Registered electors		4,895		
Irish Unionist hold		Swing	+0.1	

1916 by-election: North Fermanagh
Party	Candidate	Votes	%	±%
Irish Unionist	Edward Archdale	Unopposed		
Irish Unionist hold				

1918 general election (14 December 1918): North Fermanagh
Party	Candidate	Votes	%	±%
Irish Unionist	Edward Archdale	6,768	52.0	−1.9
Sinn Féin	Kevin O'Shiel	6,236	47.9	New
Majority		532	4.1	−3.7
Turnout		13,004	89.7	−1.4
Registered electors		14,496		
Irish Unionist hold		Swing		

== Sources ==
- Walker, Brian M., ed. (1978). Parliamentary Election Results in Ireland, 1801–1922. Dublin: Royal Irish Academy. ISBN 0901714127.
- Debrett's Guide to the House of Commons and Judicial Bench. 1918. p. 220.
- Stenton, M.; Lees, S., eds. (1978). Who's Who of British members of parliament: Volume II 1886–1918. The Harvester Press.
- Leigh Rayment's Historical List of MPs – Constituencies beginning with "F"
