= Godfrey Fetherstonhaugh =

Irish Unionist Party politician

Godfrey Fetherstonhaugh KC; 11 April 1858 – September 1928) was an Irish Unionist Party politician. He was elected at the 1906 general election as Member of Parliament (MP) for North Fermanagh, and held the seat until he resigned from the House of Commons on 16 October 1916 by taking the post of Steward of the Manor of Northstead.

Parliament of the United Kingdom
Preceded by Edward Mitchell	Member of Parliament for North Fermanagh; 1906–1916	Succeeded by Edward Archdale
