= Constitutionalist (UK) =

British political grouping

Constitutionalist was a label used by some British politicians standing for Parliament in the 1920s, instead of the more traditional party labels. The label was used primarily by former supporters of the David Lloyd George-led coalition government, and most notably by Winston Churchill. However, there was no party organisation called the Constitutionalist Party.

== Origins ==
In 1922, when the Unionist Party voted to end the coalition government with the National Liberal Party, there were still members of both parties who preferred to continue working together. At the 1922 general election, in a number of constituencies local Unionist Associations decided to continue supporting National Liberal candidates and vice versa. However, by the 1923 general election, the National Liberals had formally rejoined the Liberal Party. In some constituencies there was still some electoral co-operation between Unionists and Liberals. In Dartford a former National Liberal member of Parliament, George Jarrett, chose not to join the Liberal party and sought re-election as a 'Constitutionalist'. He was supported by the local Unionist Association.

== Meaning of Constitutionalist ==
The term had nothing to do with Constitutionalism in the philosophical sense. The term was meant to signify that the adherents believed in the principles of English constitutional government through electoral politics. It was used to highlight their belief that Labour, as a socialist party, did not fully support the existing English constitution. In January 1924 the first Labour government had taken office amongst fears of threats to the constitution.

== Winston Churchill ==
The former National Liberal cabinet minister Winston Churchill was an adherent to this view of constitutionalism. He was noted at the time for being particularly hostile to socialism. In March 1924 Churchill sought election at the 1924 Westminster Abbey by-election. He had originally sought the backing of the local Unionist association, which happened to be called the Westminster Abbey Constitutional Association, and adopted the term 'Constitutionalist' to describe himself during the by-election campaign. After the by-election Churchill continued to use the term and talked about setting up a Constitutionalist Party.

== 1924 general election ==
Any plans that Churchill may have had to create a Constitutionalist Party were shelved with the calling of another general election. While there were a number of Liberals and Unionists who sought electoral co-operation, as in 1923, there were twelve who decided to use the label Constitutionalist rather than Liberal or Unionist. These included Churchill but not Jarrett who had been the first to use the term in 1923. Of those who used the label Constitutionalist, three former National Liberal members of Parliament were opposed by official Liberals, while six sitting Liberal members were only opposed by Labour candidates and three other candidates were only opposed by Labour.

Date of election	Constituency	Candidate	Notes
1924 general election	Epping	Winston Churchill	Elected; opposed by Liberal candidate
1924 general election	Walthamstow East	Sir Hamar Greenwood	Elected; opposed by Liberal candidate
1924 general election	Camborne	Algernon Moreing	Elected; opposed by Liberal candidate
1924 general election	Stretford	Sir Thomas Robinson	Sitting MP re-elected in two-way contest with Labour
1924 general election	Stoke	John Ward	Sitting MP re-elected in two-way contest with Labour
1924 general election	Heywood and Radcliffe	Abraham England	Sitting MP re-elected in two-way contest with Labour
1924 general election	Accrington	Hugh Edwards	Sitting MP re-elected in two-way contest with Labour
1924 general election	Battersea North	Henry Hogbin	Sitting MP defeated in two-way contest with Communist
1924 general election	Tottenham North	John Leng Sturrock	Sitting MP (for Montrose Burghs) defeated in two-way contest with Labour
1924 general election	Burslem	William Allen	Lost seat in two-way contest with Labour
1924 general election	Consett	James Davies	Lost seat in two-way contest with Labour
1924 general election	Nottingham West	Charles Edgar Loseby	Lost seat in two-way contest with Labour

== 1924–1929 parliament ==
After the election, the seven Constitutionalist candidates who were elected did not act or vote together as a group. The four previously sitting as Liberals who had held their seats all re-took the Liberal whip, while Churchill, Greenwood, and Moreing took the Unionist whip. Churchill accepted the post of Chancellor of the Exchequer in Stanley Baldwin's Unionist government. The description 'Constitutionalist' dropped out of use.
