= National Liberal Party (UK, 1922) =

- Leader: David Lloyd George
- Founder: David Lloyd George
- Founded: 19 January 1922
- Dissolved: 13 November 1923
- Merger of: Coalition Liberals, National Democratic Party
- Merged into: Liberal Party
- Headquarters: London
- Newspaper: Lloyd George Liberal Magazine
- Ideology: British nationalism New liberalism Free trade
- Political position: Centre

The National Liberal Party was a liberal political party in the United Kingdom from 1922 to 1923. It was created as a formal party organisation for those Liberals, led by Prime Minister David Lloyd George, who supported the Coalition Government (1918–22) and subsequently a revival of the Coalition, after it ceased holding office. It was officially a breakaway from the Liberal Party. The National Liberals ceased to exist in 1923 when Lloyd George agreed to a merger with the Liberal Party.

== History ==
=== Origin ===
The "Coalition Coupon", often referred to as "the coupon", referred to the letter sent to parliamentary candidates at the 1918 general election, endorsing them as official representatives of the Coalition Government. The overdue 1918 general election took place in the heady atmosphere of victory following the First World War and the desire for revenge against Germany and its allies. Receiving the coupon was interpreted by the electorate as a sign of patriotism that helped candidates be elected, while those who did not receive it had a more difficult time as they were sometimes seen as being anti-war or pacifist. The letters were all dated 20 November 1918 and were signed by Prime Minister David Lloyd George for the Coalition Liberals and Bonar Law, the Leader of the Conservative Party. As a result, the 1918 general election has become known as 'the coupon election'.

The letters all contained the same simple text:

Dear (name of candidate)

We have much pleasure in recognising you as the Coalition Candidate for (name of constituency). We have every hope that the Electors will return you as their Representative in Parliament to support the government in the great task which lies before it.

Yours truly,

D. Lloyd George

A. Bonar Law

Some coalition candidates included the wording of the letter in their election addresses.

Following confidential negotiations between Lloyd George's Coalition Chief Whip, Freddie Guest, and George Younger, Chairman of the Conservative Party, over the summer of 1918, it was agreed that 150 Liberals were to be offered the support of the Prime Minister and the Leader of the Conservative Party at the next general election.

According to the figures recorded in Trevor Wilson's book, The Downfall of the Liberal Party, 159 Liberal candidates received the 'coupon'. A few of these were Liberal supporters of H. H. Asquith. Of those Liberals receiving the 'coupon' 136 were elected, whereas only 29 who did not receive the 'coupon' were returned to Parliament.

In addition to the Liberal and Conservative candidates who received the 'coupon' some letters were also sent to Labour supporters of the Coalition (although most were repudiated by the official Labour Party) and some to members of the '"patriotic labour" National Democratic Party.

=== Government ===
Lloyd George, a Liberal, replaced the Liberal Party leader H. H. Asquith as prime minister in 1916, at the head of a coalition ministry most of whose parliamentary members were Conservatives. Asquith and many of his leading colleagues went into opposition, but at first it was not clear that the division in the Liberal Party would result in a formal party split.

Lloyd George and the Conservative leader Bonar Law decided to continue the coalition after the end of the war. The two leaders agreed to issue a letter to a single government supporter in most constituencies for the 1918 general election, which thus became known as the 'coupon election'. Not all loyal MPs got the coupon and some who were offered it rejected the support, but this marked a formal division between Coalition Liberal supporters of Lloyd George and those Liberals loyal to Asquith and the official party.

After the coalition won the general election and the non-coalition wing of the party had suffered catastrophic defeat, the split in the Liberal Party became deeper. Of the 36 Liberal MPs elected without the coupon, nine supported the coalition. The others held a meeting and declared themselves to be the Liberal Parliamentary Party. During the course of the Parliament, the split spread through highest and lowest levels of the party organisation. At a meeting of the National Liberal Federation in May 1920, coalition ministers were shouted down, and the division became even more obvious.

=== Reunion ===
Eventually, despairing of capturing the official Liberal Party, tainted with apostasy and awkward hypocrisy but adamant on the need to compromise to solve major social, micro- and macro-economic problems, the Prime Minister decided to set up his own party. A meeting was held in London on 18–19 January 1922. Its own National Liberal Council was formed. The division was complete, with members rapidly deciding with which arm of the party to side.

Upon the Conservative Party's withdrawal from the Coalition, Lloyd George resigned as prime minister on 19 October 1922. The 1922 general election that followed was disastrous for both Liberal parties. Only 62 Liberals and 53 National Liberals were elected.

With the end of the coalition, the National Liberals had lost their reason for existing as a separate party. However, the bitterness caused by years of internal struggles made immediate Liberal reunion impossible and two parties retained their separate party organisations.

=== Dissolution ===
The political landscape was changed once more when in late 1923 the new prime minister and Conservative Party leader Stanley Baldwin decided to call a general election to seek a mandate to abandon free trade and introduce tariffs. Despite the deep hostility between the leaders of the Liberal and National Liberal parties, the call for a defence of Free Trade once more enabled all of them to unite around their most distinctive policy.

On 13 November 1923, the leaders of the two Liberal parties declared that "all candidates will be adopted and described as Liberals, and will be supported by the whole strength of the Party without regard to any past differences". This declaration marked the end of the National Liberal party—along with the ending of its journal, the Lloyd George Liberal Magazine the same month. However, the money that the Coalition Liberal/National Liberals had accumulated from the sale of honours and other donations to finance the party were retained by Lloyd George as a separate political fund. It was officially known as the National Liberal Party fund in 1925 and then changed its name to Lloyd George's Political fund in 1931. This fund would remain a source of constant friction in the reunited Liberal party and would later lead to further divisions in the 1930s before disappearing in 1945 when Lloyd George's son Gwilym Lloyd George who was the only surviving trustee of the fund deposited what was left into a private bank account.

At the 1923 general election about half the former National Liberals lost their seats. Winston Churchill, who had lost his Dundee seat in the 1922 general election as a National Liberal, failed to be re-elected as a Liberal for Leicester in 1923. Churchill would return to the House of Commons as a "Constitutionalist" at the 1924 general election and rejoined the Conservative Party the following year. Others, like former Cabinet minister Christopher Addison, had already joined the Labour Party, whilst many former leading members of the National Liberals, including Frederick Guest and Alfred Mond, would eventually join Churchill and move over to the Conservative Party by the end of the 1920s.

Although the reunited Liberal Party won a total of 158 seats in 1923, the party was reduced to a rump of 40 MPs in the 1924 general election, with Asquith losing his seat but Lloyd George remaining an MP.

== Legacy ==
As Margaret Cole's memoir of the time makes clear, many competent and patriotic candidates who did not receive the 'coupon', including sitting Liberal and Labour MPs, found themselves categorised as somehow anti-war or pacifist as a result. Sir Percy Harris, who had been MP for Harborough since 1916, recorded that once the 'coupon' had been allocated to his Conservative opponent it was interpreted as a personal reflection upon him by his constituents who assumed he must have done something wrong for the Liberal prime minister to be seen offering his open support to a rival.

Most historians have since agreed that the coupon essentially sealed the fate of those Liberals who were not fortunate enough to receive the Coalition's backing. Those Liberals that Lloyd George chose to abandon were left defenceless against Coalition candidates, who had a full claim on the spirit of national unity and patriotism that characterised Britain's war weary mood following the end of hostilities.

The election result was catastrophic for these Asquithian Liberals, who were decimated in the Coupon election. Only 28 were returned, and even Asquith lost the seat he had held in East Fife since the 1886 general election. Though the Liberal and National Liberals fought the 1923 election as one party, the political legacy of these earlier divisions would remain under the surface and re-emerge in the British economic and political crisis of 1931.

== Electoral performance ==
Parliament of the United Kingdom
Election	Leader	Votes			Seats			Government
Election	Leader	No.	%	Position	No.	±	Position	Government
1922	David Lloyd George	1,355,366	9.9	4th	53 / 615	▼71	▼4th	Conservative

== Leadership history ==
=== Leaders of the National Liberal Party ===
Name (Birth–Death)	Portrait	Constituency	Entered office	Left office
David Lloyd George (1863–1945)		Carnarvon Boroughs	19 January 1922	13 November 1923

=== Deputy Leaders of the National Liberal Party ===
Name (Birth–Death)	Portrait	Constituency	Entered office	Left office
Winston Churchill (1874–1965)		Dundee defeated	19 January 1922	15 November 1922
Alfred Mond (1868–1930)		Swansea West	20 November 1922	13 November 1923

=== Chief Whip of the National Liberal Party ===
Name (Birth–Death)	Portrait	Constituency	Entered office	Left office
Charles McCurdy (1870–1941)		Northampton	19 January 1922	20 December 1922
Edward Hilton Young (1879–1960)		Norwich	20 December 1922	13 November 1923

== Bibliography ==
- The History of the Liberal Party 1895–1970, by Roy Douglas (Sidgwick & Jackson 1971)
- A Short History of the Liberal Party 1900–92, by Chris Cook (Macmillan Press 1993)
