= Electoral history of Winston Churchill =

Elections featuring UK Prime Minister

This is a summary of the electoral history of Winston Churchill, who served in a multitude of ministerial positions between 1908 and 1955, including as Prime Minister of the United Kingdom from 1940 to 1945 and again from 1951 to 1955, and as a Member of Parliament (MP) for five different constituencies between 1900 and 1964, except for a break in 1922–24.

== Parliamentary elections ==
=== 1899 Oldham by-election ===
1899 Oldham by-election
Party	Candidate	Votes	%	±%
Liberal	✓ Alfred Emmott	12,976	26.7	+2.1
Liberal	✓ Walter Runciman	12,770	26.2	+2.0
Conservative	Winston Churchill	11,477	23.6	−2.6
Conservative	James Mawdsley	11,449	23.5	−1.5
Majority		1,527	3.2	N/A
Majority		1,293	2.6	N/A
Turnout		24,546 (est)	86.2	−1.3
Registered electors		28,476		
Liberal gain from Conservative		Swing	+2.4	
Liberal gain from Conservative		Swing	+1.8	

=== 1900 general election, Oldham ===
General election 1900: Oldham
Party	Candidate	Votes	%	±%
Liberal	✓ Alfred Emmott	12,947	25.3	+0.7
Conservative	✓ Winston Churchill	12,931	25.3	−0.9
Liberal	Walter Runciman	12,709	24.9	+0.7
Conservative	Charles Birch Crisp	12,522	24.5	−0.5
Turnout		51,109	87.9	+0.4
Registered electors		29,253		
Majority		425	0.8	N/A
Liberal gain from Conservative		Swing	+0.6	
Majority		222	0.4	0.0
Conservative hold		Swing	−0.8	

=== 1906 general election, Manchester North West ===
General election 1906: Manchester North West
Party	Candidate	Votes	%	±%
Liberal	Winston Churchill	5,639	56.2	New
Conservative	William Joynson-Hicks	4,398	43.8	N/A
Majority		1,241	12.4	N/A
Turnout		10,037	88.0	N/A
Registered electors		11,411		
Liberal gain from Conservative		Swing	N/A	

=== 1908 Manchester North West by-election ===
1908 Manchester North West by-election
Party	Candidate	Votes	%	±%
Conservative	William Joynson-Hicks	5,417	50.7	+6.9
Liberal	Winston Churchill	4,988	46.7	−9.5
Social Democratic Federation	Dan Irving	276	2.6	New
Majority		429	4.0	N/A
Turnout		10,681	89.7	+1.7
Registered electors		11,914		
Conservative gain from Liberal		Swing	+8.2	

=== 1908 Dundee by-election ===
1908 Dundee by-election
Party	Candidate	Votes	%	±%
Liberal	Winston Churchill	7,079	43.9	−8.7
Liberal Unionist	George Washington Baxter, 1st Baronet	4,370	27.1	−3.0
Labour	G. H. Stuart-Bunning	4,014	24.9	+1.6
Scottish Prohibition	Edwin Scrymgeour	655	4.1	New
Majority		2,709	16.8	−1.7
Turnout		16,138	84.6	+2.7
Registered electors		19,041		
Liberal hold		Swing	−2.9	

=== January 1910 general election, Dundee ===
General election January 1910: Dundee (2 seats) (Note: Compared to combined Liberal vote at 1906 election)
Party	Candidate	Votes	%	±%
Liberal	Winston Churchill	10,747	34.1	−8.5
Labour	Alexander Wilkie	10,365	32.9	+9.6
Conservative	John Hall Seymour Lloyd	4,552	14.4	+3.5
Liberal Unionist	James Glass	4,339	13.8	+0.6
Scottish Prohibition	Edwin Scrymgeour	1,512	4.8	N/A
Turnout		31,515	86.1	+4.2
Registered electors		19,374		
Majority		6,195	19.7	+1.2
Liberal hold				
Majority		5,813	18.5	+16.1
Labour hold				

=== December 1910 general election, Dundee ===
General election December 1910: Dundee (2 seats)
Party	Candidate	Votes	%	±%
Liberal	Winston Churchill	9,240	30.1	−4.0
Labour	Alexander Wilkie	8,957	29.3	−3.6
Liberal Unionist	George Washington Baxter, 1st Baronet	5,685	18.6	+4.8
Conservative	John Hall Seymour Lloyd	4,914	16.0	+1.6
Scottish Prohibition	Edwin Scrymgeour	1,825	6.0	+1.2
Turnout		30,621	84.1	−2.0
Registered electors		19,118		
Majority		3,555	11.5	−8.2
Liberal hold				
Majority		3,272	10.7	−7.8
Labour hold				

=== 1917 Dundee by-election ===
1917 Dundee by-election
Party	Candidate	Votes	%	±%
National Liberal	Winston Churchill	7,302	78.2	+58.1
Scottish Prohibition	Edwin Scrymgeour	2,036	21.8	+15.8
Majority		5,266	56.4	+44.9
Turnout		9,338	42.5	−41.6
Registered electors		21,953		
National Liberal hold		Swing	+21.2	

=== 1918 general election, Dundee ===
General election 1918: Dundee (2 seats)
Party		Candidate	Votes	%	±%
C	National Liberal	Winston Churchill	25,788	37.5	+7.4
	Labour	Alexander Wilkie	24,822	36.1	+6.8
	Scottish Prohibition	Edwin Scrymgeour	10,423	15.1	+9.1
	Labour	James Sunney Brown	7,769	11.3	N/A
Turnout			68,802	46.6	−37.5
Majority			15,365	22.4	+10.9
	National Liberal hold				
Majority			14,399	21.0	+10.3
	Labour hold				
C indicates candidate endorsed by the coalition government.

=== 1922 general election, Dundee ===
General election 1922: Dundee (2 seats)
Party	Candidate	Votes	%	±%
Scottish Prohibition	Edwin Scrymgeour	32,578	27.6	+12.5
Labour	E. D. Morel	30,292	25.6	−10.5
National Liberal	David Johnstone MacDonald	22,244	18.8	N/A
National Liberal	Winston Churchill	20,466	17.3	−20.2
Liberal	Robert Pilkington	6,681	5.7	N/A
Communist	Willie Gallacher	5,906	5.0	New
Majority		12,132	10.3	N/A
Majority		8,048	6.8	−14.2
Turnout		118,167	80.5	+33.9
Scottish Prohibition gain from National Liberal		Swing		
Labour hold		Swing		

=== 1923 general election, Leicester West ===
General election 1923: Leicester West
Party	Candidate	Votes	%	±%
Labour	Frederick Pethick-Lawrence	13,634	44.6	−0.4
Liberal	Winston Churchill	9,236	30.2	+3.6
Unionist	Alfred Instone	7,696	25.2	New
Majority		4,398	14.4	−2.2
Turnout		30,566	76.0	+3.5
Registered electors		40,244		
Labour hold		Swing	−2.0	

=== 1924 by-election, Westminster Abbey ===
1924 Westminster Abbey by-election
Party	Candidate	Votes	%	±%
Conservative	Otho Nicholson	8,187	35.9	N/A
Constitutionalist	Winston Churchill	8,144	35.8	New
Labour	Fenner Brockway	6,156	27.0	New
Liberal	James Scott Duckers	291	1.3	New
Majority		43	0.1	N/A
Turnout		22,778	61.6	N/A
Conservative hold		Swing	N/A	

=== 1924 general election, Epping ===
General election 1924: Epping
Party	Candidate	Votes	%	±%
Constitutionalist	Winston Churchill	19,843	58.9	N/A
Liberal	Gilbert Granville Sharp	10,080	29.9	−17.2
Labour	J R McPhie	3,768	11.2	New
Majority		9,763	29.0	N/A
Turnout		33,691	78.3	+11.9
Registered electors		43,055		
Constitutionalist gain from Unionist		Swing		

=== 1929 general election, Epping ===
General election 1929: Epping
Party	Candidate	Votes	%	±%
Unionist	Winston Churchill	23,972	48.5	−10.4
Liberal	Gilbert Granville Sharp	19,005	38.4	+8.5
Labour	Walton Newbold	6,472	13.1	+1.9
Majority		4,967	10.1	−18.9
Turnout		49,449	75.2	−3.1
Registered electors		65,758		
Unionist gain from Constitutionalist		Swing	−9.5	

=== 1931 general election, Epping ===
General election 1931: Epping
Party	Candidate	Votes	%	±%
Conservative	Winston Churchill	35,956	63.8	+15.3
Liberal	Arthur Comyns Carr	15,670	27.8	−10.6
Labour	James Ranger	4,713	8.4	−4.7
Majority		20,286	36.0	+25.9
Turnout		56,339	77.3	+2.1
Conservative hold		Swing		

=== 1935 general election, Epping ===
General election 1935: Epping
Party	Candidate	Votes	%	±%
Conservative	Winston Churchill	34,849	59.0	−4.8
Liberal	Gilbert Granville Sharp	14,430	24.4	−3.4
Labour	James Ranger	9,758	16.5	+8.1
Majority		20,419	34.6	−1.4
Turnout		59,037	67.7	−9.6
Conservative hold		Swing		

=== 1945 general election, Woodford ===
General election 1945: Woodford
Party	Candidate	Votes	%	±%
Conservative	Winston Churchill (Note: technically stood as "Conservative and National". See Toye 2015, p213)	27,688	72.53	
Independent	Alexander Hancock	10,488	27.47	
Majority		17,200	45.06	
Turnout		38,176	65.53	
Conservative win (new seat)				

=== 1950 general election, Woodford ===
General election 1950: Woodford
Party	Candidate	Votes	%	±%
Conservative	Winston Churchill	37,239	59.61	−12.92
Labour	Seymour Hills	18,740	30.00	New
Liberal	Howard Vivien Davies	5,664	9.07	New
Communist	Bill Brooks	827	1.32	New
Majority		18,499	29.61	−15.45
Turnout		62,470	86.06	+20.53
Conservative hold		Swing		

=== 1951 general election, Woodford ===
General election 1951: Woodford
Party	Candidate	Votes	%	±%
Conservative	Winston Churchill	40,938	62.96	+3.35
Labour	William Aaron Archer	22,359	34.39	+4.39
Communist	John Ross Campbell	871	1.34	+0.02
Independent	Alexander Hancock	851	1.31	New
Majority		18,579	28.57	−1.04
Turnout		65,019	83.38	−2.68
Conservative hold		Swing		

=== 1955 general election, Woodford ===
General election 1955: Woodford
Party	Candidate	Votes	%	±%
Conservative	Winston Churchill	25,069	73.02	
Labour	Arnold Keith Morgan Milner	9,261	26.98	
Majority		15,808	46.04	
Turnout		34,330	75.96	
Conservative hold		Swing		

=== 1959 general election, Woodford ===
General election 1959: Woodford
Party	Candidate	Votes	%	±%
Conservative	Winston Churchill	24,815	71.24	−1.78
Labour	Arthur Latham	10,018	28.76	+1.78
Majority		14,797	42.48	−3.57
Turnout		34,833	77.29	+1.33
Conservative hold		Swing		

== General elections (as leader of the Conservative Party) ==
=== 1945 general election ===
Results of the July 1945 general election to the House of Commons of the United Kingdom
Party	Leader	Candidates	MPs					Aggregate votes		
Party	Leader	Candidates	Total	Gains	Losses	Net	Of total (%)	Total	Of total (%) (Note: Adjusted for multi-member constituencies.)	Change (%)
Labour	Clement; Attlee	603 (Note: Includes 34 Co-operative Party candidates, as part of the Labour-Co-op alliance.)	393 (Note: Includes 23 Co-operative Party MPs, as part of the Labour-Co-op alliance.)	242 (Note: Includes 14 Co-operative Party MPs, as part of the Labour-Co-op alliance.)	3	▲239	61.4 (Note: Includes 3.6% for the Co-operative Party, as part of the Labour-Co-op alliance.)	11,967,746 (Note: Includes 635,335 for the Co-operative Party, as part of the Labour-Co-op alliance.)	48.0 (Note: Includes 2.6% for the Co-operative Party, as part of the Labour-Co-op alliance.)	▲10.0 (Note: Includes ▲0.9% for the Co-operative Party, as part of the Labour-Co-op alliance.)
Churchill Caretaker Ministry (Total)	Winston; Churchill	618	210	16	235	▼219	32.8	9,972,010	39.6	▼13.7
Conservative (Note: Figure includes the Unionist Party and the Ulster Unionist Party under their nation affiliations with the Conservative Party.)	Winston; Churchill	559	197	14	204	▼190	30.8	9,101,099	36.2	▼11.6
Liberal; National	Ernest; Brown	49	11	0	22	▼22	1.7	737,732	2.9	▼0.8
National	—N/a	10	2 (Note: Andrew Duncan in City of London and John Anderson in Combined Scottish Universities.)	2 (Note: Andrew Duncan in City of London and John Anderson in Combined Scottish Universities.)	1 (Note: Ivor Guest in Brecon and Radnorshire.)	▲1	0.3	133,179	0.5	▲0.2
National; Labour	—N/a	0	0	Dissolved		▼8	—	0	0.0	▼1.5
Liberal	Archibald; Sinclair	306	12	5	14	▼9	1.9	2,252,430	9.0	▲2.3
Nationalist	James; McSparran	3	2	0	0	Steady	0.3	148,078	0.4	▲0.1
Independent	—N/a	36	8	6	0	▲6	—	132,340	0.5	▲0.5
Common Wealth	C. A. Smith	23	1 (Note: Vernon Bartlett in Chelmsford.)	New		▲1	—	110,634	0.4	New
Communist	Harry; Pollitt	21	2 (Note: Phil Piratin in Mile End and Willie Gallacher in West Fife.)	1 (Note: Phil Piratin in Mile End.)	0	▲1	0.3	102,780	0.4	▲0.3
Independent; Unionist	—N/a	3	2 (Note: John Mackie in Galloway and James Little in Down.)	Did not stand in 1935		▲2	—	82,542	0.3	—N/a
Independent; Labour	—N/a	7	2	2 (Note: Denis Pritt in Hammersmith North and Jack Beattie in Belfast West.)	0	▲2	—	63,135	0.3	▲0.2
National; Independent	—N/a	11	2 (Note: Ernest Graham-Little in London University and Daniel Lipson in Cheltenham.)	1 (Note: Daniel Lipson in Cheltenham.)	1 (Note: Austin Hopkinson in Mossley.)	Steady	—	61,749	0.3	▲0.1
Ind. Labour Party	Bob; Edwards	5	3	0	1 (Note: George Buchanan re-elected in Glasgow Gorbals but as official Labour candidate.)	▼1	0.5	46,679	0.2	▼0.5
Independent; Progressive	—N/a	7	1	1 (Note: Ernest Millington in Bridgwater.)	0	▲1	0.2	35,071	0.1	▲0.1
SNP	Douglas; Young	8	0	0	0	Steady	—	30,595	0.1	Steady
Independent; Liberal	—N/a	3	2	2 (Note: John MacLeod in Ross and Cromarty and Murdoch Macdonald in Inverness.)	0	▲2	—	30,450	0.1	▲0.1
Plaid Cymru	Saunders; Lewis	7	0	0	0	Steady	—	16,017	0.1	▲0.1
Commonwealth Labour Party	Harry; Midgley	1	0	New			—	14,096	0.1	New
Independent; Conservative	—N/a	3	0	0	0	Steady	—	9,729	0.0	▼0.1
Independent; National	—N/a	4	0	Did not stand in 1935			—	5,430	0.0	—N/a
Liverpool; Protestant	Harry Dixon Longbottom	1	0	0	0	Steady	—	2,601	0.0	Steady
Protestant; Action	John Cormack	1	0	New			—	2,493	0.0	New
Christian; Pacifist	—N/a	1	0	Did not stand in 1935			—	2,381	0.0	—N/a
Agriculturalist	—N/a	2	0	Did not stand in 1935			—	2,057	0.0	—N/a
Democratic	Norman Leith-Hay-Clark	5	0	New			—	1,809	0.0	New
Medical	—N/a	1	0	New			—	1,249	0.0	New
Socialist (GB)	—N/a	1	0	New			—	472	0.0	New
United Socialist	Guy; Aldred	1	0	New			—	300	0.0	New
Independent Scoittish Nationalist	—N/a	1	0	New			—	232	0.0	New
Total		1,683	640	25 (Note: The number of seats in England was increased from 492 to 517 for this election.)		▲25	100.0	25,095,195	100.0	0.0
Registered voters, and turnout								33,672,036 (Note: Including the electorate in uncontested constituencies.)	72.8 (Note: Adjusted for multi-member constituencies.)	▲1.7

=== 1950 general election ===

Results of the February 1950 general election to the House of Commons of the United Kingdom
Party	Leader	Candidates	MPs					Aggregate votes		
Party	Leader	Candidates	Total	Gains	Losses	Net	Of total (%)	Total	Of total (%)	Change (%)
Labour	Clement; Attlee	617 (Note: Includes 33 Co-operative Party candidates, as part of the Labour-Co-op alliance.)	315 (Note: Includes 18 Co-operative Party MPs, as part of the Labour-Co-op alliance.)	—N/a (Note: Difficult to calculate due to significant boundary changes.)		▼78 (Note: Includes ▼5 Co-operative Party MPs, as part of the Labour-Co-op alliance.)	50.4 (Note: Includes 2.8% for the Co-operative Party, as part of the Labour-Co-op alliance.)	13,266,176 (Note: Includes 719,756 for the Co-operative Party, as part of the Labour-Co-op alliance.)	46.1 (Note: Includes 2.5% for the Co-operative Party, as part of the Labour-Co-op alliance.)	▼1.9 (Note: Includes ▼0.1% for the Co-operative Party, as part of the Labour-Co-op alliance.)
Conservative (Total)	Winston; Churchill	619	298	—N/a		▲90	47.7	12,492,404	43.4	▲4.3
Conservative (Note: Figure includes the Unionist Party and the Ulster Unionist Party under their nation affiliations with the Conservative Party.)	Winston; Churchill	564	282	—N/a		▲85	45.1	11,507,061	40.0	▲3.8
National Liberal	John; Maclay	55	16	5	0	▲5	2.6	985,343	3.4	▲0.5
Liberal	Clement; Davies	475	9	3	6	▼3	1.4	2,621,487	9.1	▲0.1
Communist	Harry; Pollitt	100	0	0	2	▼2	—	91,765	0.3	▼0.1
Nationalist	James; McSparran	2	2	0	0	Steady	0.3	65,211	0.2	▼0.2
Independent	—N/a	9	0	0	8	▼8	—	53,505	0.2	▼0.3
Irish Labour	William; Norton	2	0	New			—	52,715	0.2	New
Labour Independent Group	Denis; Pritt	5	0	New			—	26,014	0.1	New
Sinn Féin	Paddy; McLogan	2	0	Did not stand in 1945			—	23,362	0.1	—N/a
Plaid Cymru	Gwynfor; Evans	7	0	0	0	Steady	—	17,580	0.1	Steady
Independent; Liberal	—N/a	2	1 (Note: John MacLeod in Ross and Cromarty.)	0	1 (Note: Murdoch Macdonald in Inverness.)	▼1	0.2	15,066	0.1	Steady
Independent; Conservative	—N/a	4	0	0	0	Steady	—	13,689	0.1	▲0.1
SNP	Robert; McIntyre	3	0	0	0	Steady	—	9,708	0.0	▼0.1
Independent; Labour	—N/a	2	0	0	2	▼2	—	6,839	0.0	▼0.3
Anti-Partition	James; McSparran	4	0	New			—	5,084	0.0	New
Ind. Labour Party	David; Gibson	4	0	0	3	▼3	—	4,112	0.0	▼0.2
Independent; Welsh Nationalist	—N/a	1	0	New			—	1,511	0.0	New
Scottish; Self-Government	—N/a	1	0	New			—	1,039	0.0	New
Scottish; Home Rule	—N/a	2	0	New			—	915	0.0	New
Welsh; Republican	—N/a	1	0	New			—	631	0.0	New
Social Credit	John; Hargrave	1	0	Did not stand in 1945			—	551	0.0	—N/a
Christian; Democratic	—N/a	1	0	New			—	503	0.0	New
Socialist (GB)	—N/a	2	0	0	0	Steady	—	503	0.0	Steady
United Socialist Movement	Guy; Aldred	1	0	0	0	Steady	—	485	0.0	Steady
Independent; Scottish Nationalist	—N/a	1	0	0	0	Steady	—	283	0.0	Steady
Other non-contested		0	0	—N/a		▼8 (Note: 2 National MPs, 2 National Independent MPs, 2 Independent Unionist MPs, 1 Common Wealth Party MP, and 1 Independent progressive MP.)	—	0	0.0	—N/a
Total		1,868	625			▼15	100.0	28,771,124	100.0	0.0
Registered voters, and turnout								34,412,266	83.9	▲11.1

=== 1951 general election ===

Results of the October 1951 general election to the House of Commons of the United Kingdom
Party	Leader	Candidates	MPs					Aggregate votes		
Party	Leader	Candidates	Total	Gains	Losses	Net	Of total (%)	Total	Of total (%)	Change (%)
Labour	Clement; Attlee	617 (Note: Includes 38 Co-operative Party candidates, as part of the Labour-Co-op alliance.)	295 (Note: Includes 16 Co-operative Party MPs, as part of the Labour-Co-op alliance.)	2	22	▼20 (Note: Includes ▼2 Co-operative Party MPs, as part of the Labour-Co-op alliance.)	47.2 (Note: Includes 2.6% for the Co-operative Party, as part of the Labour-Co-op alliance.)	13,948,883 (Note: Includes 845,509 for the Co-operative Party, as part of the Labour-Co-op alliance.)	48.8 (Note: Includes 2.9% for the Co-operative Party, as part of the Labour-Co-op alliance.)	▲2.7 (Note: Includes ▲0.4% for the Co-operative Party, as part of the Labour-Co-op alliance.)
Conservative (Total)	Winston; Churchill	617	321	25	2	▲23	51.4	13,718,199	48.0	▲4.6
Conservative (Note: Figure includes the Unionist Party and the Ulster Unionist Party under their nation affiliations with the Conservative Party.)	Winston; Churchill	562	302	22	2	▲20	48.3	12,660,061	44.3	▲4.3
National Liberal	John; Maclay	55	19	3	0	▲3	3.0	1,058,138	3.7	▲0.3
Liberal	Clement; Davies	109	6	1	4	▼3	1.0	730,546	2.6	▼6.5
Irish Labour	William; Norton	1	0	1	0	▲1	—	33,174	0.1	▼0.1
Independent; Nationalist	—N/a	1	1	Did not stand in 1945		▲1	0.2	33,097	0.1	—N/a
Nationalist	James; McSparran	1	1	0	1	▼1	0.2	32,714	0.1	▼0.1
Independent; Republican	—N/a	1	0	Did not stand in 1945			—	26,976	0.1	—N/a
Communist	Harry; Pollitt	10	0	0	0	Steady	—	21,640	0.1	▼0.2
Independent	—N/a	5	0	0	0	Steady	—	19,633	0.1	▼0.1
Plaid Cymru	Gwynfor; Evans	4	0	0	0	Steady	—	10,920	0.0	▼0.1
SNP	Robert; McIntyre	2	0	0	0	Steady	—	7,299	0.0	Steady
Independent; Conservative	—N/a	2	0	0	0	Steady	—	6,062	0.0	▼0.1
Ind. Labour Party	Fred; Barton	3	0	0	0	Steady	—	4,057	0.0	Steady
British Empire	P. J. Ridout	1	0	New			—	1,643	0.0	New
Anti-Partition	James; McSparran	4	0	0	0	Steady	—	1,340	0.0	Steady
United Socialist Movement	Guy; Aldred	1	0	0	0	Steady	—	411	0.0	Steady
Other non-contested		0	0	—N/a		▼1 (Note: 1 Independent Liberal MP.)	—	0	0.0	—N/a
Total		1,376	625			0	100.0	28,596,594	100.0	0.0
Registered voters, and turnout								34,919,331	82.6	▼1.3
