= 1889 Dundee by-election =

UK parliamentary by-election

The 1889 Dundee by-election was a parliamentary by-election held in September 1889 to elect one of the members for the British House of Commons constituency of Dundee, following the death of Joseph Firth.

== Background ==
In February 1888 the voters of Dundee had gone to the polls to elect a replacement for Charles Carmichael Lacaita, one of the two members elected for Dundee in the 1886 general election, who had resigned from Parliament due to his disapproval of Gladstone's Home Rule policy. The winner of this contest was the Liberal Joseph Bottomley Firth. However Firth died in September 1889.

== Election ==
Shortly after Firth's death speculation started has to who would contest the vacant seat, with the Glasgow Herald reporting ex-Bailie Robertson was expected to be offered the Liberal nomination, with Mr Dalglish and Mr W. L. Boase thought to be possible Unionist candidates. John Burns was also speculated upon as a possible Socialist candidate. Four local Liberals, including John Leng, reportedly declined nomination as a candidate, but Leng eventually agreed to stand. John Leng had come to Dundee in 1851 to edit and manage The Dundee Advertiser, which he turned into a daily newspaper. He also founded The People's Journal, The Evening Telegraph and The People's Friend. The Glasgow Herald considered Leng to be a 'strong candidate', but thought that the Dundee Unionists had a chance of defeating him if they selected 'candidate of great local weight'.

Ultimately there was no contest and Leng was returned without opposition, the first time the Dundee seat had not been contested since Sir John Ogilvy was returned unopposed at the 1865 general election, when Dundee was still a one-member seat.

Leng was a supporter of Irish Home Rule and also supported Home Rule for Scotland, chairing a meeting of the Scottish Home Rule Association on the evening of his election. The Glasgow Herald described him as a strong supporter of Gladstone and considered Dundee 'fortunate' to have him as an MP.

== Result ==
Dundee by-election, 25th September 1889
Party	Candidate	Votes	%	±%
Liberal	John Leng	Unopposed		
Liberal hold				
