= 1908 Dundee by-election =

UK parliamentary by-election

- 9 May 1908

		Lib
Candidate	Winston Churchill	George Washington Baxter
Party	Liberal	Liberal Unionist
Popular vote	7,099	4,370
Percentage	43.9%	27.1%
Candidate	G. H. Stuart-Bunning	Edwin Scrymgeour
Party	Labour	Scottish Prohibition
Popular vote	4,014	655
Percentage	24.9%	4.1%
MP before election
Edmund Robertson
Liberal
Subsequent MP
Winston Churchill
Liberal

The 1908 Dundee by-election was a Parliamentary by-election held on 9 May 1908 for the constituency of Dundee. The constituency returned two Members of Parliament (MP) to the House of Commons of the United Kingdom, elected by the first past the post voting system.

== Vacancy ==
The by-election was triggered by the incumbent Liberal MP, Edmund Robertson, vacating the seat upon being elevated to the peerage as 1st Baron Lochee.

== Previous election ==
Robertson

General election 1906: Dundee (2 seats)
Party	Candidate	Votes	%	±%
Liberal	Edmund Robertson	9,276	31.7	+1.5
Labour Repr. Cmte.	Alexander Wilkie	6,833	23.3	New
Liberal	Henry Robson	6,122	20.9	−6.4
Liberal Unionist	Ernest Shackleton	3,865	13.2	−6.8
Conservative	A. Duncan Smith	3,183	10.9	−9.2
Majority		5,411	18.5	+8.9
Majority		711	2.4	N/A
Turnout		29,279	81.9	+12.4
Liberal hold		Swing		
Labour gain from Liberal		Swing		

== Candidates ==
Thirty-four-year-old Winston Churchill was selected by the local Liberal Association to be their candidate. Churchill had been elected Liberal MP for Manchester North West at the 1906 general election but had lost his seat at the 1908 Manchester North West by-election on 24 April. Churchill had been appointed to the Cabinet by H. H. Asquith as President of the Board of Trade. Under the law at the time, a newly appointed Cabinet Minister was obliged to seek re-election at a by-election; hence, he sought an opportunity to return to parliament.

Sir George Baxter, a 55-year-old local man, was chosen by the Unionists in Dundee. He was a linen and jute manufacturer, and had been Chairman of Dundee and District Liberal Unionist Association ever since its creation in 1886. He had contested Montrose Burghs in 1895. Baxter was the son of the former Liberal MP for Montrose Burghs, William Edward Baxter, and a great-nephew of the philanthropists Sir David Baxter and Mary Ann Baxter.

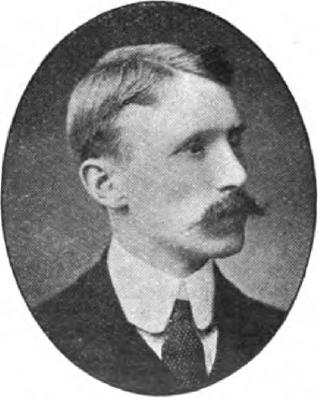
Stuart-Bunning

The local Labour Party selected 38-year-old G. H. Stuart as their candidate. He was born in Oldham, and became a postman and an activist in the Postmen's Federation. He also became active in the Labour Party, and stood unsuccessfully in York at the 1906 general election, His candidature was endorsed by the Scottish section of the party, but the National Executive refused to back him, as the party already held the other Dundee seat, and was concerned that it would over-reach itself.

Forty-two-year-old Edwin Scrymgeour stood as a Scottish Prohibition Party candidate. In direct opposition to Churchill, who had conducted his campaign from various hotel and hostelry bars and rarely made it back to his occasional residence in Springfield. Whereas Scrymgeour, a native of Dundee and a pioneer of the Scottish temperance movement, had established his party in 1901 to further this aim. He had previously been a member of the Independent Labour Party. He was elected to Dundee Town Council in 1905. He had not previously stood for parliament.

== Campaign ==
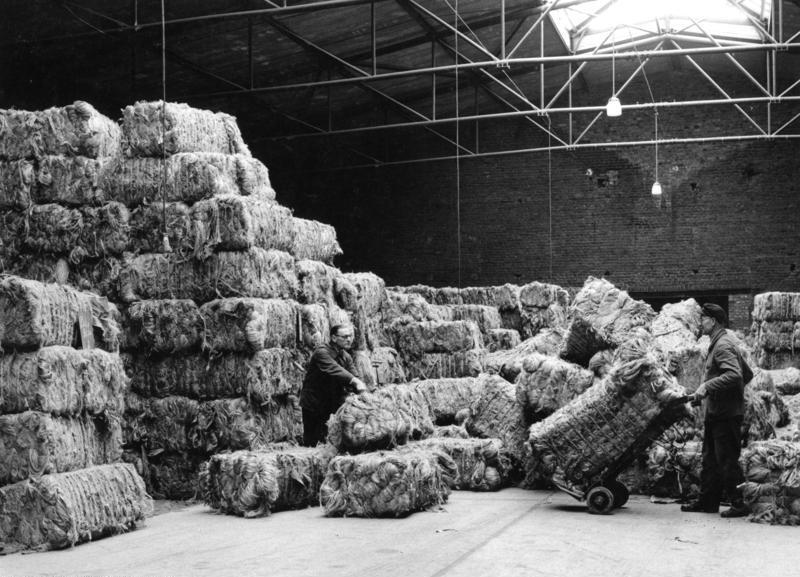
Raw jute

The issue of free trade v protectionism featured prominently in the campaign. This was because the jute industry was significant in Dundee, and it relied on importing raw jute, mainly from India. The Unionist, Sir George Baxter, stood on a protectionist platform, focusing his protectionist demands on Germany rather than India. However, James Caird, a prominent local jute proprietor, actively supported the free-trader Churchill by funding his pro-free trade propaganda.

On 14 May (after the poll), Churchill gave a significant speech at Kinnaird Hall [see external links, below].

Despite Stuart not being officially endorsed by the Labour Party, the party leader, Keir Hardie, sent him a letter of support in which condemned Churchill for "shameless prevarication" over the Right to Work Bill. He also spoke on Stuart's platform, and the Dundee Courier enthusiastically reported his criticisms of the Liberal Party candidate, Winston Churchill. Stuart was criticised for speaking too little about socialism and for not holding membership of the Independent Labour Party.

Scrymgeour described himself as a "Prohibition and Labour" candidate. As a strict Christian, he urged electors to "vote how you pray".

The Women's Social and Political Union was active in the campaign, with Mary Gawthorpe, Emmeline Pankhurst and Christabel Pankhurst holding meetings in the town. However, they were upstaged by the non-violent Women's Freedom League member Dorothy Moloney who came up from London for the campaign. Whenever Churchill spoke, Maloney produced a swinging dinner bell which drowned out what he was saying. The ding-dong exchanges were taken in fun initially, but some meetings had to be cancelled because of the uproar.

== Result ==
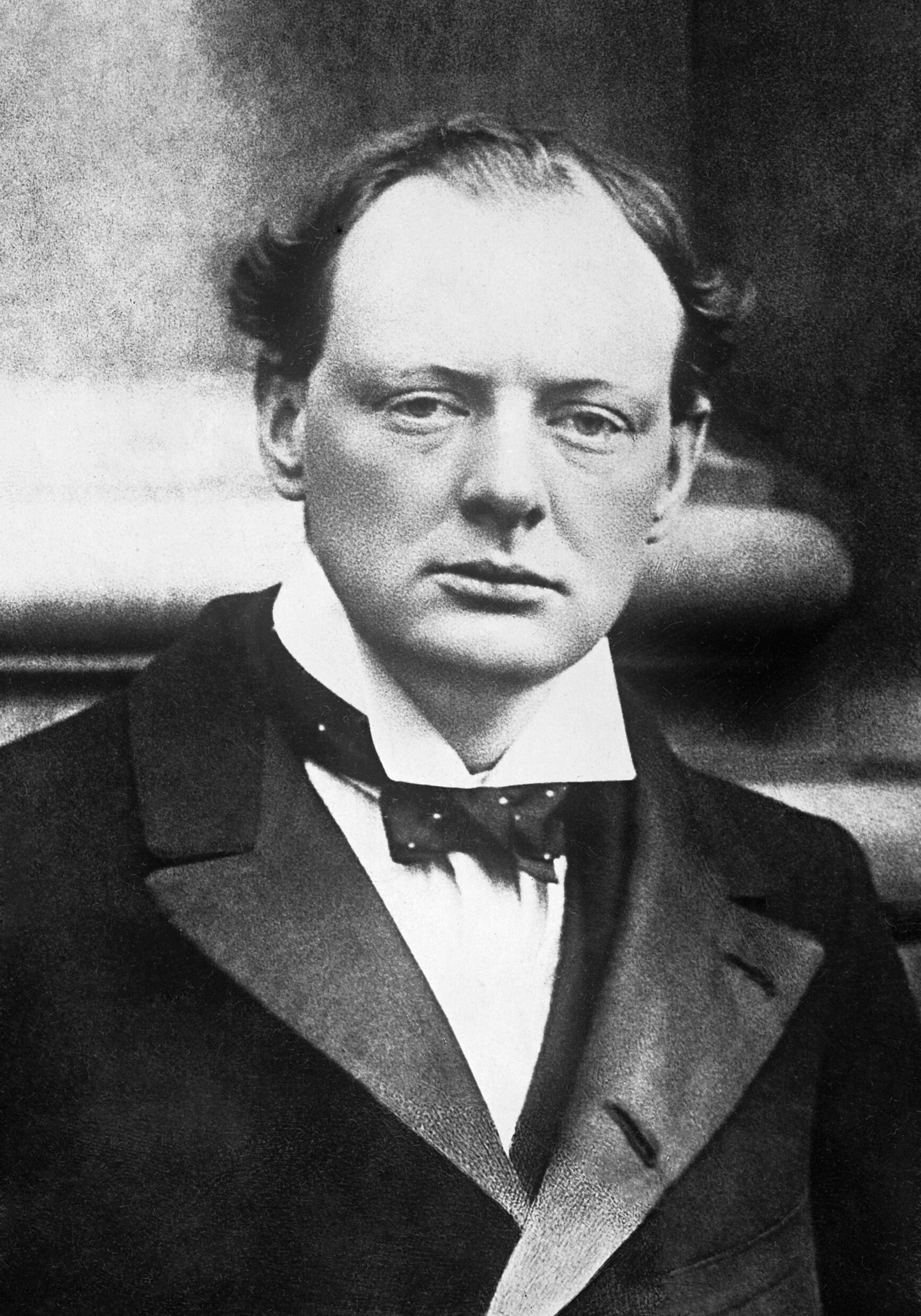
Churchill

Dundee by-election, 1908
Party	Candidate	Votes	%	±%
Liberal	Winston Churchill	7,079	43.9	−8.7
Liberal Unionist	George Washington Baxter	4,370	27.1	−3.0
Labour	G. H. Stuart-Bunning	4,014	24.9	+1.6
Scottish Prohibition	Edwin Scrymgeour	655	4.1	New
Majority		2,709	16.8	−1.7
Turnout		16,138	84.6	+2.7
Liberal hold		Swing	-2.9	

== Following election ==
General election Jan 1910: Dundee (2 seats)
Party	Candidate	Votes	%	±%
Liberal	Winston Churchill	10,747	34.1	−18.5
Labour	Alexander Wilkie	10,365	32.9	+1.6
Conservative	John Hall Seymour Lloyd	4,552	14.4	+3.5
Liberal Unionist	James Glass	4,339	13.8	+0.6
Scottish Prohibition	Edwin Scrymgeour	1,512	4.8	N/A
Turnout		31,515	86.1	+4.2
Majority		6,195	19.7	+1.2
Liberal hold		Swing		
Majority		5,813	18.5	+16.1
Labour hold		Swing		

Churchill continued to represent Dundee until 1922. Baxter re-appeared as candidate here at the December 1910 general election, his last electoral contest. Stuart made one further unsuccessful attempt to enter parliament, otherwise he concentrated on his Trade Union career. Scrymgeour continued to contest elections in Dundee and was eventually elected to the seat in 1922.

== See also ==
- 1917 Dundee by-election
- 1924 Dundee by-election
