= Edmund Robertson =

Edmund Robertson may refer to:

- Edmund Robertson, 1st Baron Lochee (1845–1911), Scottish barrister, academic and politician
- Edmund F. Robertson (born 1943), Scottish mathematician
