= 1873 Dundee by-election =

UK parliamentary by-election

The 1873 Dundee by-election was fought on 5 August 1873. The by-election was fought due to the resignation of the incumbent MP of the Liberal Party, George Armitstead. It was won by the Liberal candidate James Yeaman.
