= Frank Henderson (Scottish politician) =

Scottish politician (1836–1889)

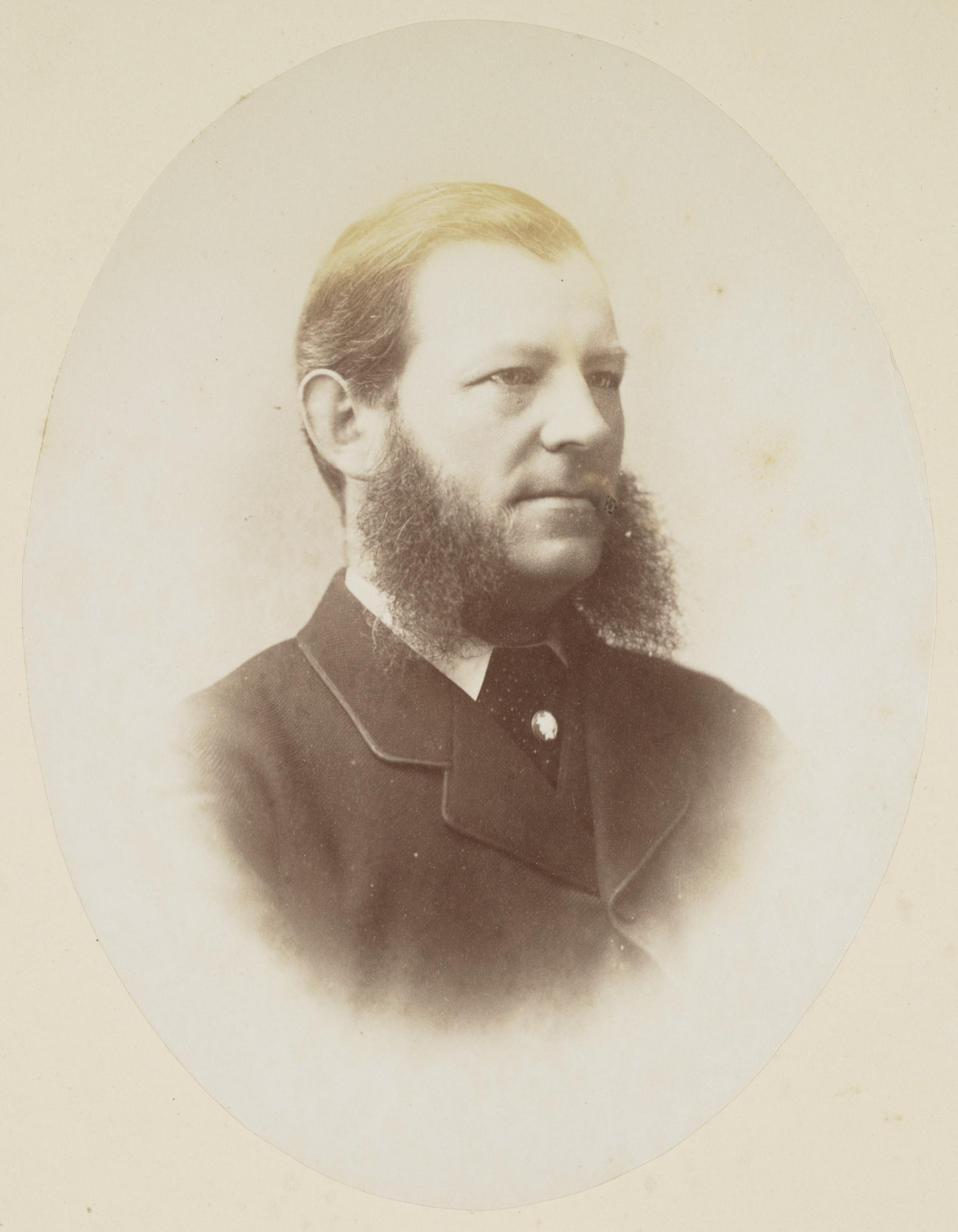
Frank Henderson, c. 1870s, photograph taken by James Valentine

Frank Henderson (1836 – 21 July 1889) was a Scottish Liberal politician who sat in the House of Commons from 1880 to 1885.

== Early life ==
Frank Henderson was born in 1836 as the youngest son of Henry Henderson, a leather merchant of Dundee, and his wife Anne Lindsay, daughter of James Lindsay. He was educated at the High School of Dundee.

== Career ==
At the 1880 general election Henderson was elected as the member of parliament (MP) for Dundee. He held the seat until the 1885 general election, when he did not stand again.

== Personal life ==
In 1863, Henderson married Ellen Isabelle Scroggie, daughter of David Scroggie of Laurencekirk, Kincardineshire. He died on 21 July 1889 at the age of 53.

Parliament of the United Kingdom
Preceded by James Yeaman; Edward Jenkins	Member of Parliament for Dundee; 1880 – 1885; With: George Armitstead	Succeeded by Edmund Robertson; Charles Carmichael Lacaita
