= 1924 Dundee by-election =

UK parliamentary by-election

- 22 December 1924

Constituency of Dundee
- Turnout: 42.4% (▼41.4%)
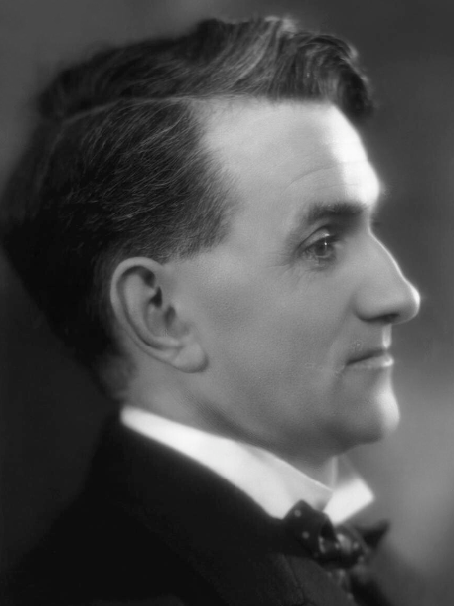

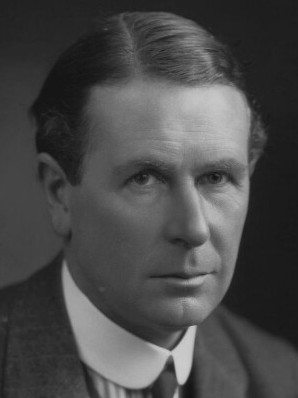
| | First party | Second party |
|---|---|---|
| Candidate | Tom Johnston | Ernest Simon |
| Party | Labour | Liberal |
| Popular vote | 22,973 | 10,234 |
| Percentage | 69.2% | 30.8% |
MP before election
E. D. Morel
Labour
Elected MP
Tom Johnston
Labour

The 1924 Dundee by-election was a by-election held on 22 December 1924 for the British House of Commons constituency of Dundee, in Scotland. It was won by the Labour Party candidate, Thomas Johnston.

== Vacancy ==
The Labour Party MP E. D. Morel had died on 25 November 1924, aged 51. Morel had held the seat since the 1922 general election, when he had been elected for one of the two seats of the constituency alongside Edwin Scrymgeour who famously defeated Winston Churchill.

== Candidates ==
The by-election was contested by only two candidates, both of whom were MPs who had been defeated elsewhere at the 1924 general election.

The Labour candidate was 42-year-old Thomas Johnston, who had been MP for Stirling and Clackmannan Western from 1922 to 1924. His only opponent was the Liberal candidate Ernest Simon, an English industrialist who had been MP for Manchester Withington from 1923.

== Result ==
On a turnout barely half that of the general election in October, Johnston held the seat for Labour, with more than 69% of the vote. He did not contest the seat at the 1929 general election, when he was re-elected for his old constituency of Stirling and Clackmannan Western, and went on to become Secretary of State for Scotland from 1941 to 1945.

Simon was re-elected in 1929 for his old Withington seat, but lost it in 1931, and did not return to the House of Commons. He later joined the Labour Party, and in 1947 he was ennobled and appointed Chairman of the Board of Governors of the BBC.

Dundee by-election, 22 December 1924
| Party | Candidate | Votes | % | ±% |
|---|---|---|---|---|
| Labour | Thomas Johnston | 22,973 | 69.2 | +42.7 |
| Liberal | Ernest Simon | 10,234 | 30.8 | +10.2 |
| Majority | | 12,739 | 38.4 | +34.6 |
| Turnout | | 33,207 | 42.4 | −41.4 |
| Labour hold | | Swing | | |

== See also ==
- Dundee (UK Parliament constituency)
- Dundee
- List of United Kingdom by-elections (1918–1931)
- 1908 Dundee by-election
- 1917 Dundee by-election

== Sources ==
- Craig, F. W. S. (1983) [1969]. British parliamentary election results 1918-1949 (3rd ed.). Chichester: Parliamentary Research Services. ISBN 0-900178-06-X.
- Leigh Rayment's Historical List of MPs
