= James Yeaman =

Scottish Liberal Party politician (1816-1886)

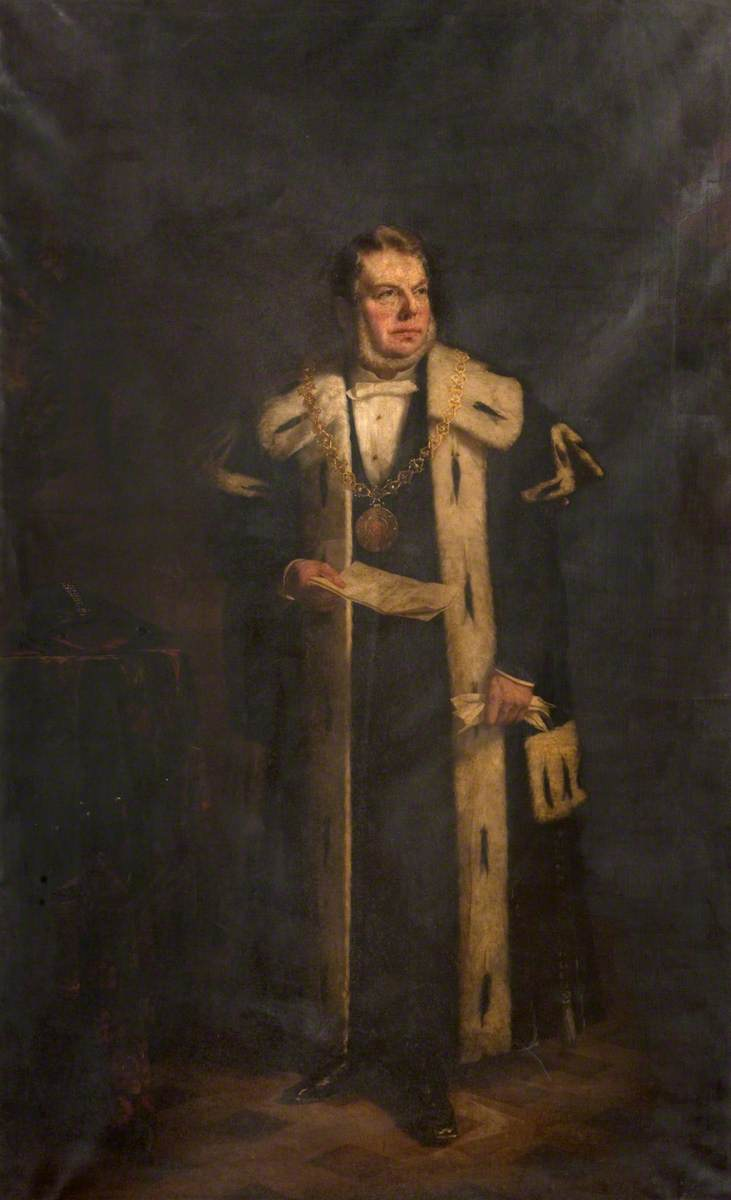
A portrait of James Yeaman (1876)

James Yeaman (1816 – 11 April 1886) was a Scottish businessman and Scottish Liberal Party, and briefly Conservative, politician. He sat in the House of Commons from 1873 to 1880 for as a member of parliament (MP) for Dundee.

He was elected at a by-election in August 1873, and re-elected in 1874. However, at the 1880 general election he stood as a Conservative, and was defeated.

A successful fish curer, Yeaman was the Lord Provost of Dundee from 1869 to 1872.

Parliament of the United Kingdom
Preceded by George Armitstead; Sir John Ogilvy, Bt	Member of Parliament for Dundee; 1873 – 1880; With: Sir John Ogilvy, Bt 1873–1874; Edward Jenkins 1874–1880	Succeeded by George Armitstead; Frank Henderson
