= James Arrott =

Scottish physician and philanthropist

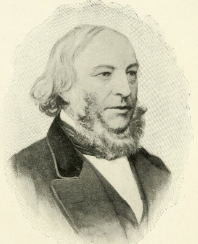
James Arrott

James Arrott MD (13 February 1808 – 13 August 1883) was a 19th-century Scottish physician and philanthropist.

He gives his name to James Arrott Drive on the Ninewells Hospital site west of Dundee.

== Biography ==
He was born in a town mansionhouse at Almeri Close in Arbroath on 13 February 1808, the son of William Arrott (1774-1862), a surgeon, and Mary Balfour, the widow of Henry Sharpy.

He was educated at Arbroath Academy then sent to Edinburgh University to study medicine. His tutors included the young Prof Christison. He gained his Diploma in 1827 and doctorate (MD) in 1829. He then did further studies on the continent in France, Belgium and the Netherlands. He then settled in Paris from late 1829 to 1831. In 1831 he returned to Scotland and set up practice in Dundee.

From 1833 to 1855 he was head physician at Dundee Royal Infirmary. This was originally on King Street, but, largely under his direction, a new hospital was designed. This was conceived in 1852 and opened in its new location of Barrack Road in February 1855. This was with the help and financial aid of Sir John Ogilvy, MP for Dundee. For the same period he was also physician to the Watt Institution, which catered for victims of consumption, under the presidency of Mr Erskine of Linlathen.

In 1819 he was presented with a stethoscope made by Laennec.

He was one of the founders of Dundee Free Library (replaced in 1895 using the Cox bequest).

At the passing of the Education (Scotland) Act in 1872 he became one of the Members of the School Board, remaining there for at least two terms of office.

He died in Dundee on 13 August 1883. On death he left almost £7000 to be used to maintain the poor of Arbroath.

Dundee Royal Infirmary closed in 1998 when its remaining functions were transferred to Ninewells Hospital.

== Family ==
He was younger half-brother to the physician William Sharpey.

He was elder brother to David Arrott (1809–1876), who founded the Arbroath Museum Society.

== Publications ==
- The Structure and Function of Animals (1834)

== Artistic recognition ==
His portrait of 1877 by John Anderson Stewart is held by Dundee City Council.
