= 1888 Dundee by-election =

UK parliamentary by-election

The 1888 Dundee by-election was a parliamentary by-election held on 16 February 1888 to elect one of the two Members of Parliament (MPs) for the British House of Commons constituency of Dundee.

== Background ==
The election was held following the resignation of Charles Carmichael Lacaita, one of the two members for the seat. Lacaita had first been elected in 1885 and who had cited his disapproval of Gladstone's Home Rule policy as his reason for resigning.

It was reported in the press that on 26 November 1887 Ex-Bailie John Robertson, the Chairman of the Dundee Liberals, had received a letter, published in full in The Glasgow Herald and The Dundee Courier and Argus two days later, from Lacaita announcing his intention to resign. In this lengthy letter Lacaita outlined his objection to what he saw as some Liberals practically encouraging Irish Nationalists pursuing "obstruction in parliament" and "violent agitation and lawlessness in Ireland". He indicated that this meant he could no longer guarantee to support William Gladstone and the Liberal Party in parliament, and as he believed that the majority in Dundee did support Gladstone and the liberals he felt he should resign. It was reported he had recently visited a prominent Scottish peer close to Gladstone before taking this action and that the peer approved of him taking this course. In a letter sent to The Dundee Courier and Argus from Brighton on 29 November 1887, Lacaita admitted to meeting with Lord Rosebery to tell him of his plan ten days earlier, but said that contrary to the previous report in the newspaper, Rosebery had actually expressed disapproval of Lacaita's views and urged him not to resign.

The local Liberals and a local Radical Association were divided on who to select as a candidate with four men all looking to stand. These included former MPs William Saunders, who was favoured by the radicals, Sir Horace Davey and Joseph Firth Bottomley Firth. Ultimately, to avoid splitting the Liberal and radical vote an agreement was reached to back Firth. The local Conservatives and Liberal Unionists united behind Sir Henry Dermot Daly, their candidate in 1886.

== Result ==
Dundee by-election, 1888
Party	Candidate	Votes	%	±%
Liberal	Joseph Firth Bottomley Firth	7,856	65.1	−5.4
Liberal Unionist	Sir Henry Dermot Daly	4,217	34.9	+5.4
Majority		3,639	30.2	+10.2
Turnout		12,073	72.7	+4.4
Liberal hold		Swing	-5.4	

== Aftermath ==
Firth died the following year. The Liberal candidate in the resulting by-election, John Leng, was returned without opposition.
