= Michael Marcus (politician) =

Michael Marcus (9 November 1894 – November 1960) (Note: Who Was Who gives his birth as 9 November 1894, but Lees and Stenton record the year as 1897.) was a Scottish Labour Party politician.

== Life ==
Marcus was educated at St Leonard's Public Board School, George Heriot's School and the University of Edinburgh, before becoming a solicitor. His initial foray into politics came in 1918, when he joined the Edinburgh Central branch of the Independent Labour Party (ILP), becoming that branch's chairman the following year. From 1923 to 1928 he was the election agent for William Graham, the sitting Labour MP for Edinburgh Central. In 1926, he was elected onto Edinburgh Corporation, representing St Leonard's ward.

He was elected at the 1929 general election as one of the two Members of Parliament for Dundee, but was defeated at the 1931 general election. He stood again in 1935, but was unsuccessful.

A supporter of appeasement, in 1938 Marcus resigned from the Labour Party and announced that he would be joining National Labour. In his letter of resignation, he stated that:

For some time past the Labour Party's foreign policy has given me much cause for alarm: and recent events have driven me irresistibly to the conclusion that the Labour Party's attitude is a menace to world peace. I am satisfied that Mr. Chamberlain's bold and courageous policy saved Europe, and indeed the world, from the horrible consequences of war, and that he is therefore entitled to support from the whole nation...

Thereafter, he focused on his legal career, becoming a barrister with the Middle Temple. He settled with his wife in Hampstead, and from 1946 to 1952 was chairman of the Finsbury and Shoreditch Rent Tribunal. He died in 1960.

== Notes ==
Parliament of the United Kingdom
Preceded by Edwin Scrymgeour and Thomas Johnston	Member of Parliament for Dundee; 1929–1931; With: Edwin Scrymgeour	Succeeded by Florence Horsbrugh and Dingle Foot
