= 1957 Ipswich by-election =

UK parliamentary by-election

The Member of Parliament for Ipswich in Suffolk, Richard Stokes, of the Labour Party died on 3 August 1957.

The by-election to fill his seat was held on 24 October. It was won for the Labour Party by Dingle Foot.

By-election 24 October 1957: Ipswich
Party	Candidate	Votes	%	±%
Labour	Dingle Foot	26,898	45.8	−7.1
Conservative	John C. Cobbold	19,161	32.6	−14.5
Liberal	Manuela Sykes	12,587	21.4	New
Majority		7,737	13.2	+7.4
Turnout		27,405		
Labour hold		Swing	+3.7	

== See also ==
- Lists of United Kingdom by-elections
