= George Duncan (politician) =

Scottish politician (1791–1878)

George Duncan (11 March 1791 – 6 January 1878) was a Scottish politician.

== Life ==
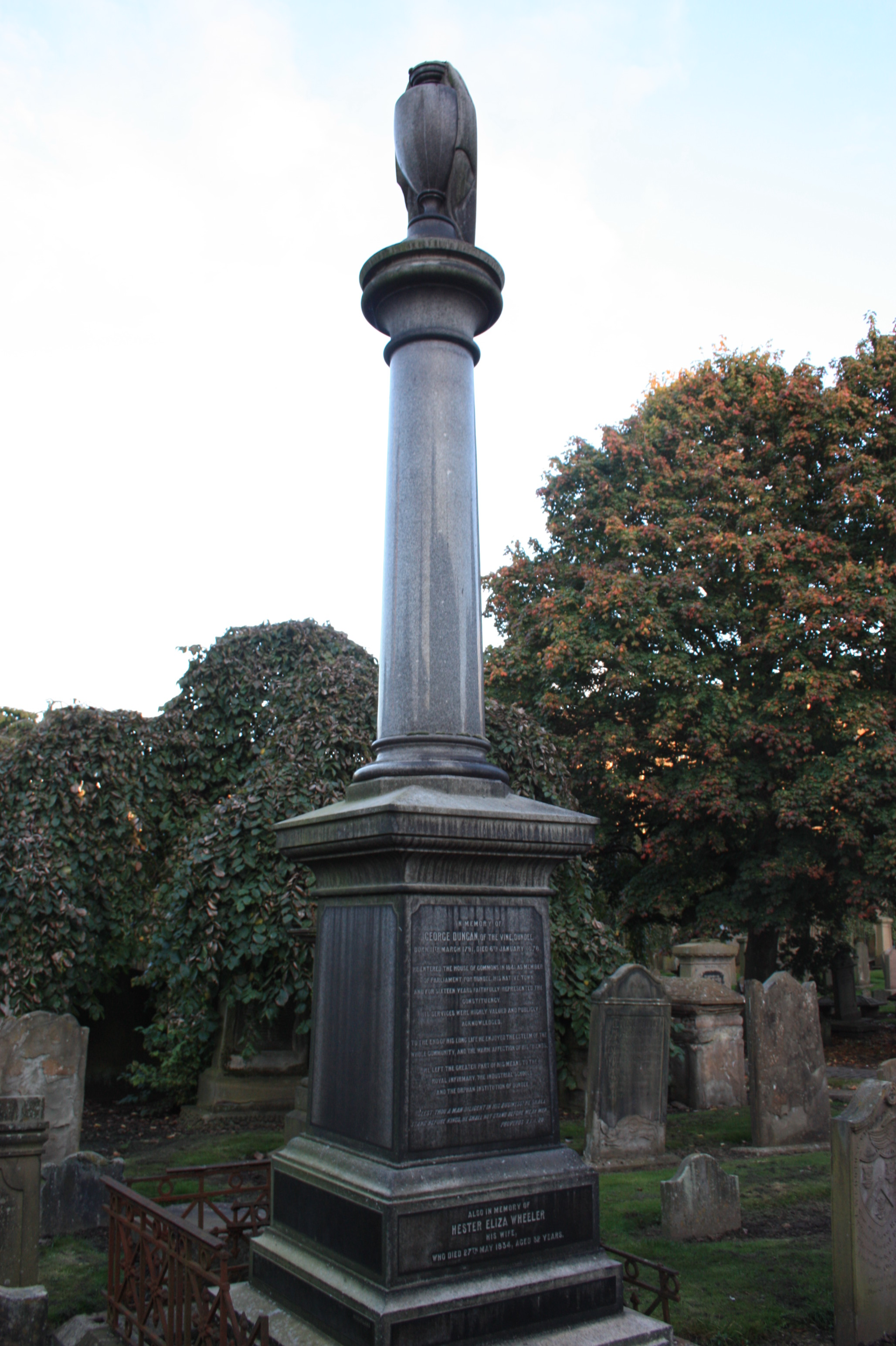
The grave of George Duncan MP, the Howff graveyard, Dundee

Born in Dundee of humble parents, William Duncan and Amelia Guthrie, he attended Dundee Academy, and was then apprenticed to a draper in Edinburgh. He started his own draper and silk mercer business in Dundee, and became very wealthy. His premises was on the High Street.

He married, on 18 November 1823, Hester Eliza Wheeler, who was about 11 years his junior and the daughter of an officer in the Royal Marines. She died 27 May 1834, aged 32, after a childless marriage.

He retired soon after, aged 45, from the drapery business. He became a Director of several companies including the Dundee, Perth and London Shipping Company, and the Forfarshire and Perthshire Fire Insurance Company.

He built himself a small mansion, "The Vine", in Magdelene Yard Road, Dundee.

George Duncan was elected to the House of Commons in 1841 as a Whig Member of Parliament (MP) being the third Member for Dundee after the 1832 Reform Act. He retired from Parliament in 1857 after serving Dundee for 16 years.

He died on 6 January 1878 and was buried at the Howff, Dundee. The grave lies on the western path.

== Family ==
He married Hester Eliza Wheeler (1802–1834). They had no children.

Parliament of the United Kingdom
| Preceded by Henry Parnell | Member of Parliament for Dundee; 1841–1857 | Succeeded by Sir John Ogilvy, Bt. |
