= Edward Jenkins (MP) =

British politician

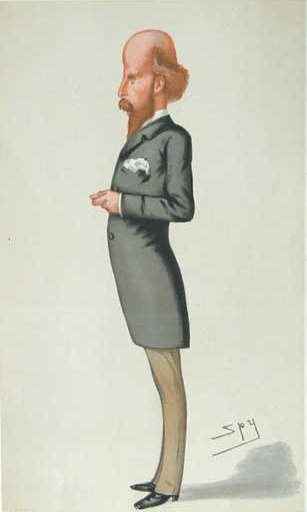
"Ginx's Baby" Jenkins as caricatured by Spy (Leslie Ward) in Vanity Fair, August 1878

John Edward Jenkins (2 July 1838 – 4 June 1910), known as Edward Jenkins or J. Edward Jenkins, was a barrister, author and Liberal Party politician in the United Kingdom. He was best known as an author of satirical novels, and also served as the Agent-General of Canada, encouraging emigration to the new Dominion. He contested several parliamentary elections, but won only one, and sat in the House of Commons from 1874 to 1880.

== Early life ==
Jenkins was born in Bangalore, Mysore, India, the eldest son of Rev. Dr. John Jenkins (1813–1898), a minister of the Wesleyan Methodist Missionary Society from 1837 to 1841. His father moved to Canada in 1847 as a Methodist minister, before becoming a Presbyterian minister in Philadelphia in 1853, and minister of a Presbyterian Church in Montreal, Quebec, Canada, from 1865. His mother was Harriet Shepstone of Mysore.

Edward's uncles included David James Jenkins, the MP for Penryn and Falmouth, and Rev. Ebenezer Jenkins, the chairman of Wesleyan Indian Missions.

He was educated in Montreal at the High School and at McGill University, and then at the University of Pennsylvania. He then moved to London, where he studied law with a conveyancer, Mr. Raymond, and was called to the bar at Lincoln's Inn in the Michaelmas term, 1864. He practised as a barrister on the Home Circuit.

== Career ==
Jenkins made his name as the author of the satire Ginx's Baby: his birth and other misfortunes, published in 1870. The book described a child born in poverty who became the victim of rival philanthropists.

He wrote at least two other satires, Lord Bantam (1871) and Barney Geoghegan, M.P (1872). The review of Lord Bantam in The Times newspaper in 1872 describes a political novel telling the story of a young nobleman of radical politics who enters Parliament supporting a redistribution of land and power, but who promptly abandons his radicalism when he inherits his father's peerage and large estates. The reviewer denounces the book as a vehicle for "Red Republican opinions", and remarks that the author wants the reader to conclude that "the working classes need never expect to derive any permanent advancement from the Radical professions of young lords who have such a stake in the existing institutions of the country". Jenkins supported the campaigns of the Warwickshire agricultural trade unionist Joseph Arch, and his novel Little Hodge (1873) dealt with the plight of landless labourers in England.

As well as the satires, Jenkins wrote a series of novels and many non-fiction-works, most of them relating to Canada.

He travelled in 1870 to Guiana on behalf of the English Benevolent Society, to "report of the condition of the coolies" (i.e. indentured labourers). His report was published in 1871, and resulted in the improvement of their conditions.

Jenkins stood for Parliament at two by-elections in the 1870s: Truro in September 1871, and Dundee in August 1873.

He was elected a member of parliament (MP) for Dundee at the 1874 general election The city was such a Liberal stronghold that its two seats were contested by four Liberals and one Conservative, and the lone Conservative came last of the five candidates. Jenkins won the seat despite being in America during the election in February, while on a lecture tour in Canada, he was appointed as the agent-general of the Dominion of Canada. His duties in that role were clarified to the House of Commons of Canada in May 1874 by the Canadian Prime Minister Alexander Mackenzie, who said that Jenkins would have surveillance of the Canadian emigration business in London, would occasionally be asked to attend to other business of a confidential nature. He would also be "expected to give some little attention to Canadian gentlemen sojourning in London". He held the post for two years.

On his return to Dundee in March, he addressed a meeting of electors in the Kinnaird Hall, Dundee. Between 2,000 and 3,000 people attended, with hundreds turned away because the hall was full.

Jenkins did not contest the 1880 general election, but stood unsuccessfully at a by-election in January 1881 for Edinburgh. He contested Dundee again at the 1885 and 1892 general elections as a Conservative, but was unsuccessful on both occasions.

He died in London on 4 June 1910, having been paralysed for some years.

== Family ==
Like his father, Jenkins was a Presbyterian.

In 1867 he married Hannah Matilda Johnstone, a daughter of William Johnson, of Belfast. They had five sons and two daughters.

== Works ==
=== Fiction ===
- Jenkins, Edward (1871). Ginx's baby: his birth and other misfortunes. London: Strahan.
- Jenkins, Edward (1872). Barney Geoghegan, M.P and Home Rule at St. Stephen's. London: Strahan.
- Jenkins, Edward (1872). Lord Bantam: a satire (3rd Canadian ed.). Montreal: Dawson.
- Jenkins, Edward (1873). Little Hodge. New York: Dodd & Mead.
- Jenkins, Edward (1876). The devil's chain. Montreal: Dawson.
- Jenkins, Edward (1877). Lutchmee and Dilloo : a study of West Indian life. London: Macmillan Education.
- Jenkins, Edward (1878). The captain's cabin : a Christmas yarn. Montreal: Dawson. ISBN 9780665074301.
- Jenkins, Edward (1878). Haverholme, or the Apotheosis of Jingo. A satire. London and Belfast: Chilworth.
- Jenkins, Edward (c. 1885). A week of passion, or, The dilemma of Mr. George Barton the younger : a novel. New York: G. Munro. ISBN 9780665370274.
- Jenkins, Edward (1886). A Secret of Two Lives. London: Keegan Paul & Co.

=== Non-fiction ===
- Stewart, Alexander P.; Jenkins, Edward (1867). The medical and legal aspects of sanitary reform. London: R. Hardwick.
- Jenkins, Edward (1869). State emigration : an essay. London: E. Stanford. ISBN 9780665235771.
- Jenkins, Edward (1871). The colonial question : being essays on imperial federalism (2nd ed.). Montreal: Dawson Bros. ISBN 9780665074332.
- Jenkins, Edward (1871). The coolie his rights and wrongs : notes of a journey to British Guiana, with a review of the system and of the recent commission of inquiry. London: Strahan.
- Jenkins, Edward, ed. (1872). Discussions on colonial questions: being a report of the proceedings of a conference held at Westminster Palace Hotel, on July 19th, 20th, and 21st, 1871. London: Strahan. ISBN 9780665074356.
- Jenkins, Edward (1871). The colonies and imperial unity, or, The "Barrel without the Hoops" : inaugural address delivered at the Conference on Colonial Questions held at Westminster Palace Hotel in London, July 19, 20 and 21, 1871 (2nd ed.). London: Strahan.
- Jenkins, Edward (1874). Glances at inner England : a lecture delivered in the United States and Canada [England of today]. London: H.S. King. ISBN 9780665084638.
- Jenkins, Edward (1875). "The Times" and Mr. Potter on Canadian railways : a criticism on critics. London : Pottle; Montreal : B. Dawson. ISBN 9780665240065.
- Jenkins, Edward (1875). Canadian immigration in 1875 : report to the Honorable the Minister of Agriculture, upon the position and prospects of immigration and with comparative statements of emigration from Great Britain during the past four years. London: Dawson.
- Jenkins, Edward (1875). The great Dominion : an address by Edward Jenkins, Esq., M.P., agent general for Canada to the Manchester Reform Club. Montreal: Dawson.
- Jenkins, Edward (1876). The blot on the Queen's head : how little Ben, the head waiter, changed the sign of the "Queen's Inn", ["]Empress Hotel Limited", and the consequences thereof, by a guest. London: Strahan.

Parliament of the United Kingdom
Preceded by James Yeaman; Sir John Ogilvy, Bt	Member of Parliament for Dundee; 1874 – 1880; With: James Yeaman	Succeeded by George Armitstead; Frank Henderson
