= Florence Horsbrugh, Baroness Horsbrugh =

British Conservative politician (1889–1969)

The Right Honourable The Baroness Horsbrugh GBE PC
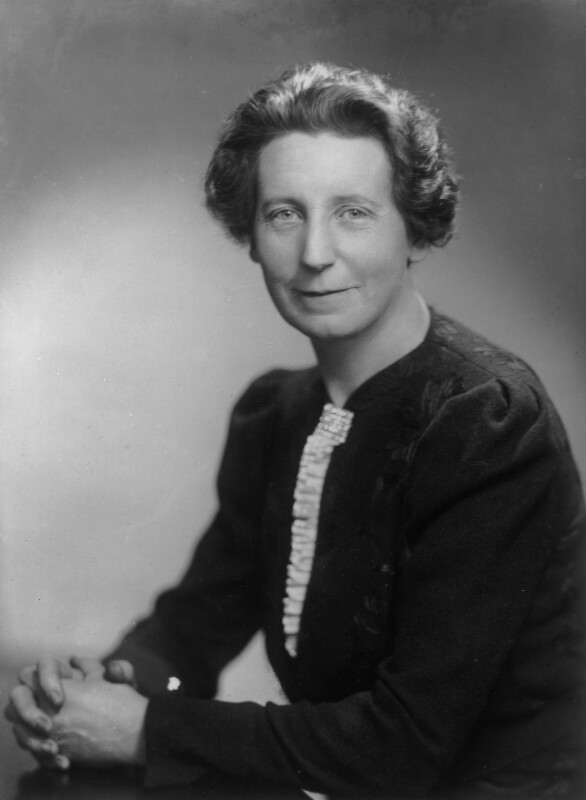
- Horsbrugh in 1945

Minister of Education
- In office 2 November 1951 – 18 October 1954
- Prime Minister: Sir Winston Churchill
- Preceded by: George Tomlinson
- Succeeded by: David Eccles

Parliamentary Secretary to the Ministry of Food
- In office 23 May 1945 – 13 July 1945
- Prime Minister: Sir Winston Churchill
- Preceded by: William Mabane
- Succeeded by: Edith Summerskill

Parliamentary Secretary to the Ministry of Health
- In office 14 July 1939 – 26 May 1945 Neville Chamberlain; Sir Winston Churchill
- Preceded by: Robert Bernays
- Succeeded by: Hamilton Kerr

Member of the House of Lords Lord Temporal
- In office 16 December 1959 – 6 December 1969; Life Peerage

Member of Parliament for Manchester Moss Side
- In office 23 February 1950 – 18 September 1959
- Preceded by: William Griffiths
- Succeeded by: James Watts

Member of Parliament for Dundee
- In office 27 October 1931 – 15 June 1945 Serving with Dingle Foot
- Preceded by: Michael Marcus; Edwin Scrymgeour
- Succeeded by: Thomas Cook; John Strachey

Personal details
- Born: 13 October 1889 Edinburgh, Scotland
- Died: 6 December 1969 (aged 80) Edinburgh, Scotland
- Party: Conservative
- Occupation: Politician

Florence Gertrude Horsbrugh, Baroness Horsbrugh GBE PC (13 October 1889 – 6 December 1969) was a Scottish Unionist Party and Conservative Party politician. The historian Kenneth Baxter has argued "in her day... [she] was arguably the best known woman MP in the UK". and that she was "arguably the most successful female Conservative parliamentarian until Margaret Thatcher".

== Early life and education ==
She was born at Edinburgh on 13 October 1889, third daughter of Henry Moncreiff Horsbrugh, a chartered accountant, and Mary Harriet, née Stark Christie. She was educated at Lansdowne House (Edinburgh), St Hilda's (Folkestone), and Mills College (California).

== Career ==
During the First World War, Horsbrugh pioneered a travelling kitchen scheme in Chelsea, London, which gained sufficient renown as to warrant an invitation to bring the kitchen to Buckingham Palace one lunch hour to entertain Queen Mary, who approved particularly of the sweets.

Horsbrugh was a Member of Parliament (MP) for Dundee from 1931 until her defeat in 1945. Her victory in 1931 was a surprising result, and she was the first woman to represent the city in the House of Commons and the first Conservative to be elected as a Member of Parliament for Dundee since the city gained its own constituency in 1832. At the time of her election, Dundee had not yet elected a female councillor. In 1936 she became the first woman to move the Address in reply to the King's Speech, following which she was interviewed for television, in the process becoming the first Member of Parliament to appear on that medium.

She unsuccessfully contested Midlothian and Peebles in 1950 and was elected in the delayed poll at Manchester Moss Side, sitting from 1950 until her retirement in 1959. Upon retirement, she was elevated to the House of Lords, as a life peer with the title Baroness Horsbrugh, of Horsbrugh in the County of Peebles, where she sat until her death.

She held ministerial office in the wartime coalition governments as Parliamentary Secretary to the Ministry of Health (1939–45), and Parliamentary Secretary to the Ministry of Food (1945). She was only the second woman to hold a ministerial post in a Conservative-led government following Katherine, Duchess of Atholl.

As Parliamentary Secretary to the Minister of Health, 1939–45, she was responsible for arranging the evacuation of schoolchildren from major cities during the war. Following her return to the House of Commons, she was the first woman to hold a Cabinet post in a Conservative government, and only the third woman, after Bondfield and Wilkinson to be appointed as a Cabinet minister in British history (1953–1954), having been appointed Minister of Education in 1951. She also served as a delegate to the Council of Europe and Western European Union from 1955 to 1960.

As part of her lifelong championing of social welfare issues, Horsbrugh took a marked interest in child welfare and introduced, as a private member, the bill which became the Adoption of Children (Regulation) Act 1939. Horsbrugh also carried out a great deal of preparatory work on the scheme which eventually became the National Health Service.

In 1945, she was a British delegate to the San Francisco Conference which established the United Nations.

== Awards ==
Horsbrugh was appointed MBE in 1920, promoted to CBE in 1939, and to GBE in 1954. She was appointed a Privy Counsellor in the 1945 New Years Honours List.

Horsbrugh was an awarded an LL.D by the University member and was also an honorary Fellow of the Royal College of Surgeons of Edinburgh.

== Sport ==
Baxter relates that Horsbrugh surprised a sports reporter who found her attending Dundee and Dundee United football matches during the 1935 election campaign. However she was a football fan and apparently supported Hearts.

== Notes ==
Parliament of the United Kingdom
Preceded by Michael Marcus; Edwin Scrymgeour	Member of Parliament for Dundee; 1931–1945; With: Dingle Foot	Succeeded by Thomas Cook; John St Loe Strachey
Preceded by William Griffiths	Member of Parliament for Manchester Moss Side; 1950–1959	Succeeded by James Watts
Political offices
Preceded by Robert Bernays	Parliamentary Secretary to the Ministry of Health; 1939–1945	Succeeded by Hamilton Kerr
Preceded by George Tomlinson	Minister of Education; 1951–1954	Succeeded by David Eccles
