= Dundee (UK Parliament constituency) =

Parliamentary constituency in the United Kingdom, 1868–1950

- Former burgh constituency for the House of Commons
- Major settlements: Dundee

1832–1950
- Seats: 1832–1868: One; 1868–1950: Two
- Created from: Forfarshire
- Replaced by: Dundee East; Dundee West

Dundee was a constituency of the House of Commons of the Parliament of the United Kingdom from 1832 to 1950, when it was split into Dundee East and Dundee West.

From 1832 to 1868 it elected one Member of Parliament (MP) using the first-past-the-post voting system, and from 1868 until its abolition for the 1950 general election it elected two MPs using the bloc vote system.

== Politics and history of the constituency ==
Winston Churchill became Member of Parliament for Dundee in a by-election of 1908 soon after losing his Manchester North West seat and retained the seat until 1922.

In 1906, the explorer Ernest Shackleton unsuccessfully ran as a candidate for the Liberal Unionist Party.

From its creation in 1832 the seat did not return a Conservative member until 1931 when Florence Horsbrugh was elected. Originally a Liberal stronghold, the seat was one of the first in Scotland to return a Labour candidate, Alexander Wilkie, who was elected in 1906.

At the 1918 general election both Churchill, still then a Liberal, and Wilkie were supported by the local Unionists, as well as their own party organisations. From 1923 onwards the Conservatives/Unionists and Liberals each ran only one candidate in the constituency. This was part of an unofficial agreement between the two parties at a local level, with the understanding being that their supporters would give their other vote to the other party's candidate.

== Boundaries ==
The boundaries of the constituency, as set out in the Representation of the People (Scotland) Act 1832, were-

"From the Point, on the East of the Town, at which the Shore of the Firth of Tay would be cut by a straight Line to be drawn from the Tower (in Fife) of Mr. Dalgleish of Scotscraig to the Point at which the Stobsmuir Road is joined by the old Road by Stobsmuir and Clepington and the old Craigie Road, in a straight Line to the said Point at which the Stobsmuir Road is joined by the old Road by Stobsmuir and Clepington and the old Craigie Road; thence, Westward, along the old Road by Stobsmuir and Clepington to the Point called Kings Cross, at which the several Boundaries of the Parishes of Dundee, Strathmartin, and Liff meet; thence in a straight Line to a Point on the Liff Road which is distant Twelve hundred Yards (measured along the Liff Road) to the West of the Point at which the Newtyle Road leaves the same; thence in a straight Line drawn due South to the Shore of the Firth of Tay; thence along the Shore of the Firth of Tay to the Point first described."

== Members of Parliament ==
Election	Party	Member	Party	Member
1832	Whig	George Kinloch	1 seat until 1868	
1833 by-election	Whig	Sir Henry Parnell	1 seat until 1868	
1841	Whig	George Duncan	1 seat until 1868	
1857	Whig	Sir John Ogilvy	1 seat until 1868	
1859	Liberal	Sir John Ogilvy	1 seat until 1868	
1868	Liberal	Sir John Ogilvy	Liberal	George Armitstead
1873 by-election	Liberal	Sir John Ogilvy	Liberal	James Yeaman
1874	Liberal	Edward Jenkins	Liberal	James Yeaman
1880	Liberal	George Armitstead	Liberal	Frank Henderson
1885	Liberal	Charles Lacaita	Liberal	Edmund Robertson
1888 by-election	Liberal	Joseph Bottomley Firth	Liberal	Edmund Robertson
1889 by-election	Liberal	John Leng	Liberal	Edmund Robertson
1906	Labour	Alexander Wilkie	Liberal	Edmund Robertson
1908 by-election	Labour	Alexander Wilkie	Liberal	Winston Churchill
1916	Labour	Alexander Wilkie	Coalition Liberal	Winston Churchill
1922	Labour	Alexander Wilkie	National Liberal	Winston Churchill
1922	Labour	E. D. Morel	Scottish Prohibition	Edwin Scrymgeour
1924 by-election	Labour	Thomas Johnston	Scottish Prohibition	Edwin Scrymgeour
1929	Labour	Michael Marcus	Scottish Prohibition	Edwin Scrymgeour
1931	Unionist	Florence Horsbrugh	Liberal	Dingle Foot
1945	Labour	John Strachey	Labour	Thomas Cook
1950	Constituency divided. See Dundee East and Dundee West			

== Election results, 1832–1868 ==
=== Elections in the 1830s ===
General election 1832: Dundee
Party	Candidate	Votes	%
Whig	George Kinloch	852	59.0
Whig	David Charles Guthrie	593	41.0
Majority		259	18.0
Turnout		1,445	89.1
Registered electors		1,622	
Whig win (new seat)			

Kinloch's death caused a by-election.

By-election, 17 April 1833: Dundee
Party	Candidate	Votes	%
Whig	Henry Parnell	Unopposed	
Whig hold			

General election 1835: Dundee
Party	Candidate	Votes	%
Whig	Henry Parnell	Unopposed	
Registered electors		1,751	
Whig hold			

Parnell was appointed as Paymaster-General of the Land Forces and Treasurer of the Navy, requiring a by-election.

By-election, 6 May 1835: Dundee
Party	Candidate	Votes	%	±%
Whig	Henry Parnell	Unopposed		
Whig hold				

General election 1837: Dundee
Party	Candidate	Votes	%
Whig	Henry Parnell	633	62.4
Conservative	John Gladstone	381	37.6
Majority		252	24.8
Turnout		1,014	45.8
Registered electors		2,214	
Whig hold			

=== Elections in the 1840s ===
General election 1841: Dundee
Party	Candidate	Votes	%	±%
Whig	George Duncan	577	56.5	−5.9
Radical	John Benjamin Smith	445	43.5	N/A
Majority		132	13.0	−11.8
Turnout		1,022	37.3	−8.5
Registered electors		2,739		
Whig hold		Swing	−5.9	

General election 1847: Dundee
Party	Candidate	Votes	%	±%
Whig	George Duncan	Unopposed		
Registered electors		2,635		
Whig hold				

=== Elections in the 1850s ===
General election 1852: Dundee
Party	Candidate	Votes	%	±%
Whig	George Duncan	Unopposed		
Registered electors		3,190		
Whig hold				

General election 1857: Dundee
Party	Candidate	Votes	%	±%
Whig	John Ogilvy	1,092	56.3	N/A
Radical	George Armitstead	847	43.7	N/A
Majority		245	12.6	N/A
Turnout		1,939	82.8	N/A
Registered electors		2,343		
Whig hold		Swing	N/A	

General election 1859: Dundee
Party	Candidate	Votes	%	±%
Liberal	John Ogilvy	Unopposed		
Registered electors		2,317		
Liberal hold				

=== Elections in the 1860s ===
General election 1865: Dundee
Party	Candidate	Votes	%	±%
Liberal	John Ogilvy	Unopposed		
Registered electors		3,039		
Liberal hold				

Seat increased to two members

General election 1868: Dundee (2 seats)
Party	Candidate	Votes	%	±%
Liberal	George Armitstead	7,738	36.8	N/A
Liberal	John Ogilvy	7,661	36.4	N/A
Liberal	James Alexander Guthrie	3,548	16.9	N/A
Liberal	Harry Warren Scott	2,085	9.9	N/A
Majority		4,113	19.5	N/A
Turnout		10,516 (est)	71.1 (est)	N/A
Registered electors		14,798		
Liberal hold		Swing	N/A	
Liberal win (new seat)				

== Election results, 1873–1918 ==
=== Elections in the 1870s ===
Armitstead resigned, causing a by-election.

By-election, 7 Aug 1873: Dundee
Party	Candidate	Votes	%	±%
Liberal	James Yeaman	5,297	51.0	N/A
Liberal	Edward Jenkins	4,010	38.6	N/A
Liberal	James Fitzjames Stephen	1,086	10.4	N/A
Majority		1,287	12.4	−7.1
Turnout		10,393	62.4	−8.7
Registered electors		16,652		
Liberal hold		Swing	N/A	

General election 1874: Dundee (2 seats)
Party	Candidate	Votes	%	±%
Liberal	James Yeaman	6,595	33.2	−3.6
Liberal	Edward Jenkins	6,048	30.5	N/A
Liberal	John Ogilvy	4,401	22.2	−14.2
Liberal	John Meiklejohn	2,231	11.2	N/A
Conservative	John Austin Lake Gloag	573	2.9	New
Majority		1,647	8.3	−11.2
Turnout		10,211 (est)	57.3 (est)	−13.8
Registered electors		17,814		
Liberal hold		Swing	N/A	
Liberal hold		Swing	N/A	

=== Elections in the 1880s ===
General election 1880: Dundee (2 seats)
Party	Candidate	Votes	%	±%
Liberal	George Armitstead	9,168	43.8	N/A
Liberal	Frank Henderson	6,750	32.3	N/A
Conservative	James Yeaman	4,993	23.9	+21.0
Majority		1,757	8.4	+0.1
Turnout		14,161 (est)	97.2 (est)	+39.9
Registered electors		14,566		
Liberal hold		Swing	N/A	
Liberal hold		Swing	N/A	

General election 1885: Dundee (2 seats)
Party	Candidate	Votes	%	±%
Liberal	Charles Lacaita	8,261	30.7	−13.1
Liberal	Edmund Robertson	7,187	26.7	−5.6
Independent Liberal	Alexander Hay Moncur	6,279	23.4	New
Conservative	Edward Jenkins	5,149	19.2	−4.7
Majority		908	3.3	−5.1
Turnout		14,623	83.9	−13.3 (est)
Liberal hold		Swing	−4.2	
Liberal hold		Swing	−0.5	

General election 1886: Dundee (2 seats)
Party	Candidate	Votes	%	±%
Liberal	Edmund Robertson	8,236	35.3	+8.6
Liberal	Charles Lacaita	8,216	35.2	+4.5
Liberal Unionist	Brinsley de Courcy Nixon	3,545	15.2	−4.0
Liberal Unionist	Henry Daly	3,346	14.3	N/A
Majority		4,671	20.0	+16.7
Turnout		11,893	68.3	−15.6
Registered electors		17,420		
Liberal hold		Swing	+6.3	
Liberal hold		Swing	+4.3	

Lacita's resignation caused a by-election.

By-election, 16 Feb 1888: Dundee
Party	Candidate	Votes	%	±%
Liberal	Joseph Bottomley Firth	7,856	65.1	−5.4
Liberal Unionist	Henry Daly	4,217	34.9	+5.4
Majority		3,639	30.2	+10.2
Turnout		12,073	72.7	+4.4
Registered electors		16,613		
Liberal hold		Swing	−5.4	

Firth's death caused a by-election.

By-election, 25 Sep 1889: Dundee
Party	Candidate	Votes	%	±%
Liberal	John Leng	Unopposed		
Liberal hold				

=== Elections in the 1890s ===
Leng

General election 1892: Dundee (2 seats)
Party	Candidate	Votes	%	±%
Liberal	John Leng	8,484	30.5	−4.7
Liberal	Edmund Robertson	8,191	29.5	−5.8
Conservative	William Dalgleish	5,659	20.4	+5.2
Liberal Unionist	William Charles Smith (politician)	5,066	18.3	+4.0
Scottish Labour	James MacDonald	354	1.3	New
Majority		2,532	9.1	−10.9
Turnout		14,025 (est)	77.0	+8.7
Registered electors		18,214		
Liberal hold		Swing	−5.0	
Liberal hold		Swing	−5.5	

Robertson is appointed Civil Lord of the Admiralty, requiring a by-election.

By-election, 1892: Dundee (1 seat)
Party	Candidate	Votes	%	±%
Liberal	Edmund Robertson	Unopposed		
Liberal hold				

Robertson

General election 1895: Dundee (2 seats)
Party	Candidate	Votes	%	±%
Liberal	Edmund Robertson	7,602	29.0	−0.5
Liberal	John Leng	7,592	28.9	−1.6
Liberal Unionist	William Charles Smith (politician)	5,390	20.6	+2.3
Conservative	Edward Jenkins	4,318	16.5	−3.9
Ind. Labour Party	James MacDonald	1,313	5.0	+3.7
Majority		2,202	8.3	−0.8
Turnout		13,490 (est)	74.9	−2.1
Registered electors		18,011		
Liberal hold		Swing	−1.4	
Liberal hold		Swing	+1.2	

=== Elections in the 1900s ===
Robertson

General election 1900: Dundee (2 seats)
Party	Candidate	Votes	%	±%
Liberal	Edmund Robertson	7,777	30.2	+1.2
Liberal	John Leng	7,650	29.7	+0.8
Conservative	Alexander Duncan Smith	5,181	20.1	+3.6
Liberal Unionist	J.E. Graham	5,152	20.0	−0.6
Majority		2,469	9.6	+1.3
Turnout		25,760	69.5	−5.4
Registered electors		18,655		
Liberal hold		Swing	−1.2	
Liberal hold		Swing	−1.4	

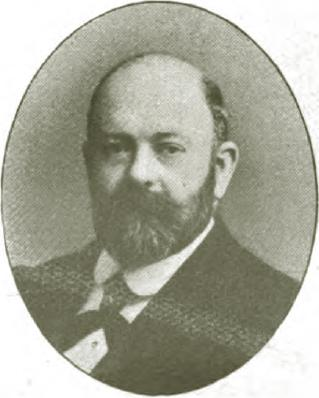
Wilkie

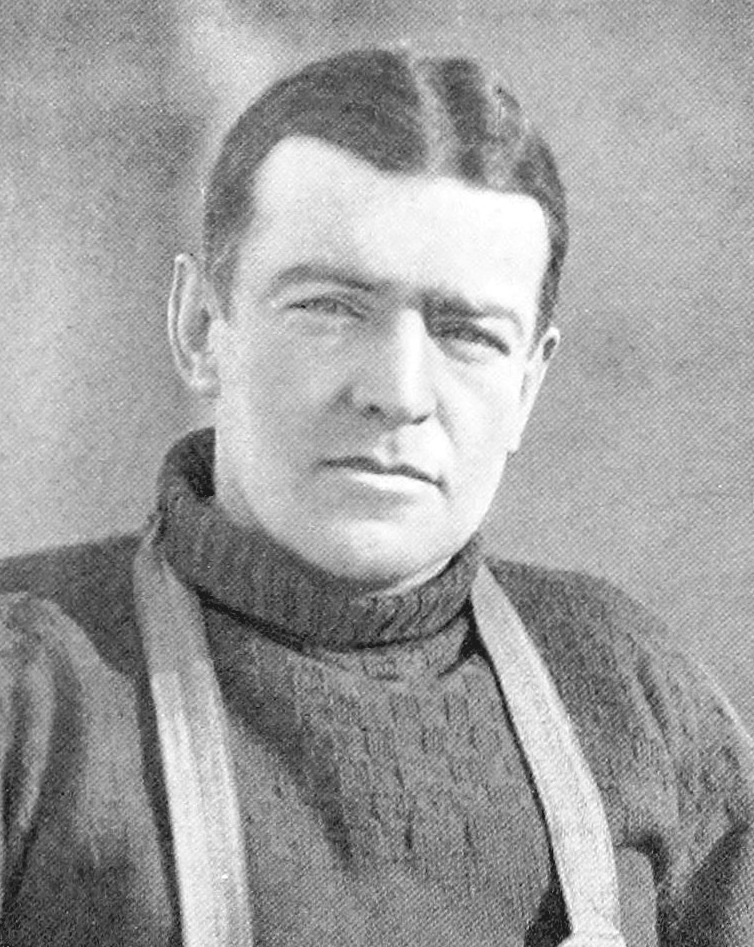
Shackleton

General election 1906: Dundee (2 seats)
Party	Candidate	Votes	%	±%
Liberal	Edmund Robertson	9,276	31.7	+1.5
Labour Repr. Cmte.	Alexander Wilkie	6,833	23.3	New
Liberal	Sir Henry Robson	6,122	20.9	−8.8
Liberal Unionist	Ernest Shackleton	3,865	13.2	−6.8
Conservative	Alexander Duncan Smith	3,183	10.9	−9.2
Turnout		29,279	81.9	+12.4
Registered electors		19,492		
Majority		5,411	18.5	+8.9
Liberal hold		Swing	+4.2	
Majority		711	2.4	N/A
Labour Repr. Cmte. gain from Liberal		Swing	N/A	

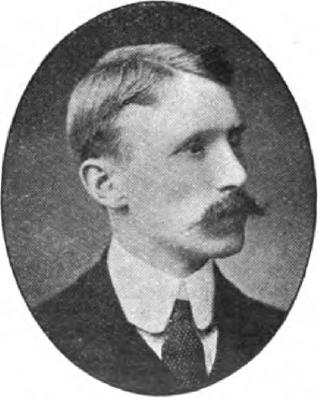
Stuart

1908 Dundee by-election
Party	Candidate	Votes	%	±%
Liberal	Winston Churchill	7,079	43.9	−8.7
Liberal Unionist	George Washington Baxter, 1st Baronet	4,370	27.1	−3.0
Labour	G. H. Stuart-Bunning	4,014	24.9	+1.6
Scottish Prohibition	Edwin Scrymgeour	655	4.1	New
Majority		2,709	16.8	−1.7
Turnout		16,138	84.6	+2.7
Registered electors		19,041		
Liberal hold		Swing	−2.9	

=== Elections in the 1910s ===
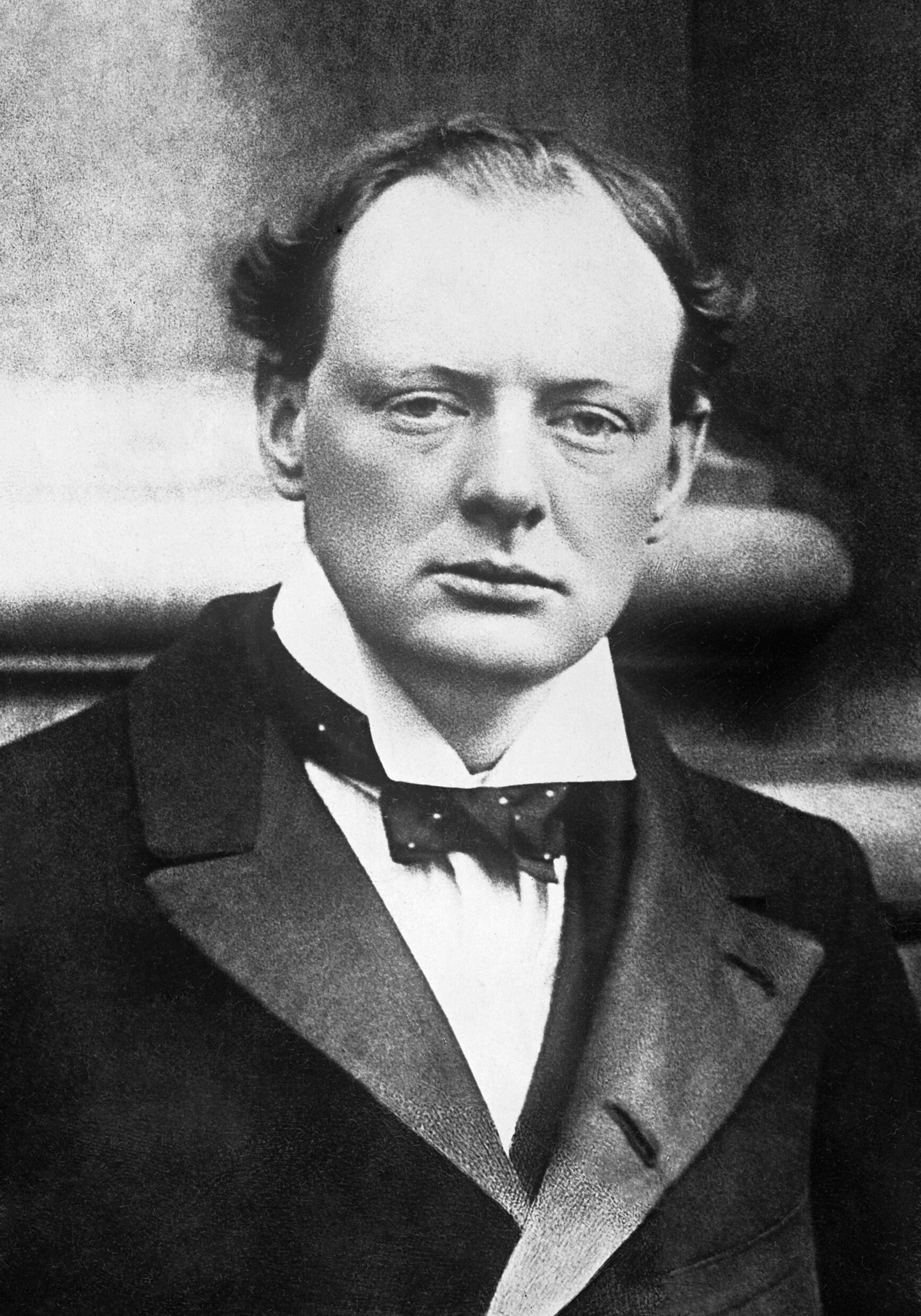
Churchill

General election January 1910: Dundee (2 seats) (Note: Compared to combined Liberal vote at 1906 election)
Party	Candidate	Votes	%	±%
Liberal	Winston Churchill	10,747	34.1	−8.5
Labour	Alexander Wilkie	10,365	32.9	+9.6
Conservative	John Hall Seymour Lloyd	4,552	14.4	+3.5
Liberal Unionist	James Glass	4,339	13.8	+0.6
Scottish Prohibition	Edwin Scrymgeour	1,512	4.8	N/A
Turnout		31,515	86.1	+4.2
Registered electors		19,374		
Majority		6,195	19.7	+1.2
Liberal hold				
Majority		5,813	18.5	+16.1
Labour hold				

General election December 1910: Dundee (2 seats)
Party	Candidate	Votes	%	±%
Liberal	Winston Churchill	9,240	30.1	−4.0
Labour	Alexander Wilkie	8,957	29.3	−3.6
Liberal Unionist	George Washington Baxter, 1st Baronet	5,685	18.6	+4.8
Conservative	John Hall Seymour Lloyd	4,914	16.0	+1.6
Scottish Prohibition	Edwin Scrymgeour	1,825	6.0	+1.2
Turnout		30,621	84.1	−2.0
Registered electors		19,118		
Majority		3,555	11.5	−8.2
Liberal hold				
Majority		3,272	10.7	−7.8
Labour hold				

1917 Dundee by-election
Party	Candidate	Votes	%	±%
National Liberal	Winston Churchill	7,302	78.2	+58.1
Scottish Prohibition	Edwin Scrymgeour	2,036	21.8	+15.8
Majority		5,266	56.4	+44.9
Turnout		9,338	42.5	−41.6
Registered electors		21,953		
National Liberal hold		Swing	+21.2	

General election 1918: Dundee (2 seats)
Party		Candidate	Votes	%	±%
C	National Liberal	Winston Churchill	25,788	37.5	+7.4
	Labour	Alexander Wilkie	24,822	36.1	+6.8
	Scottish Prohibition	Edwin Scrymgeour	10,423	15.1	+9.1
	Labour	James Sunney Brown	7,769	11.3	N/A
Turnout			68,802	46.6	−37.5
Majority			15,365	22.4	+10.9
	National Liberal hold				
Majority			14,399	21.0	+10.3
	Labour hold				
C indicates candidate endorsed by the coalition government.

In 1918 Wilkie and Churchill were officially supported by the Dundee Unionist Party Association in addition to their own party organisations.

== Election results, 1922–1945 ==
=== Elections in the 1920s ===
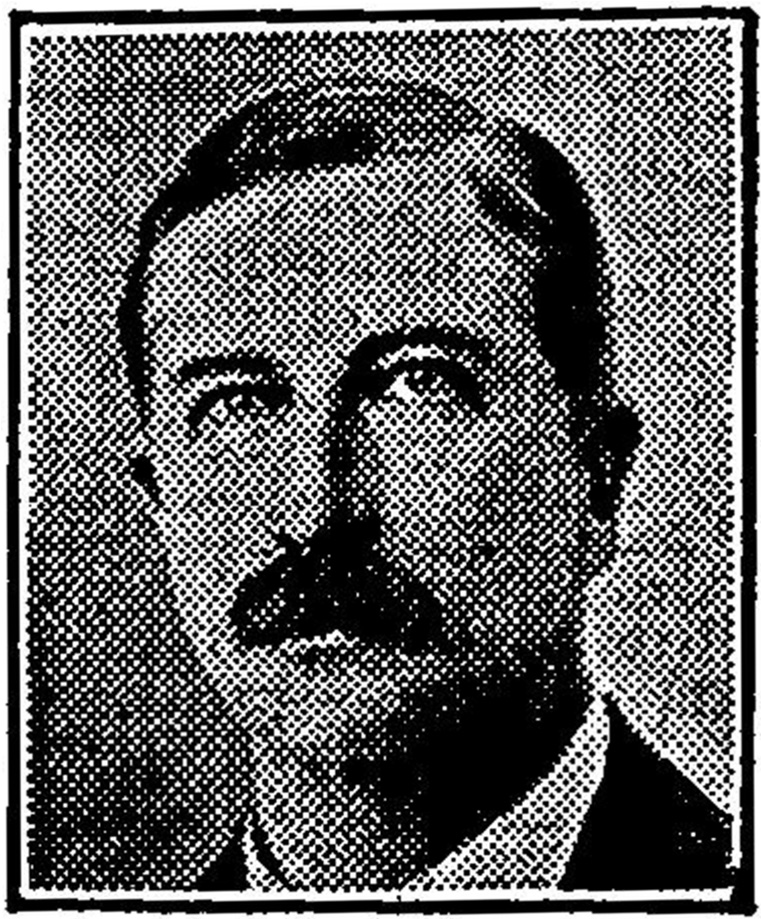
Pilkington

General election 1922: Dundee (2 seats)
Party	Candidate	Votes	%	±%
Scottish Prohibition	Edwin Scrymgeour	32,578	27.6	+12.5
Labour	E. D. Morel	30,292	25.6	−10.5
National Liberal	David Johnstone MacDonald	22,244	18.8	N/A
National Liberal	Winston Churchill	20,466	17.3	−20.2
Liberal	Robert Pilkington	6,681	5.7	N/A
Communist	Willie Gallacher	5,906	5.0	New
Majority		12,132	10.3	N/A
Majority		8,048	6.8	−14.2
Turnout		118,167	80.5	+33.9
Scottish Prohibition gain from National Liberal		Swing		
Labour hold		Swing		

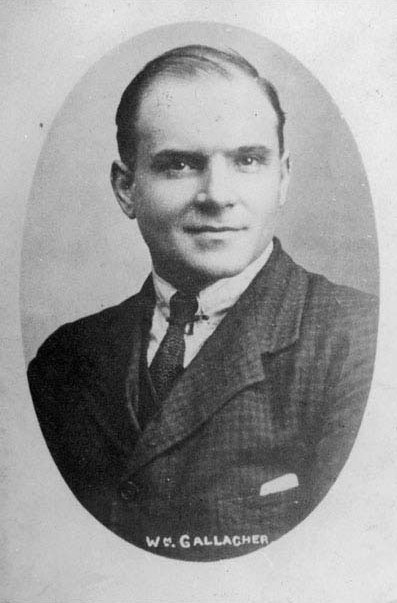
Gallacher

General election 1923: Dundee (2 seats)
Party	Candidate	Votes	%	±%
Scottish Prohibition	Edwin Scrymgeour	25,753	25.1	−2.5
Labour	E. D. Morel	23,345	22.7	−2.9
Liberal	John Pratt	23,031	22.4	+16.7
Unionist	Frederick William Wallace	20,253	19.7	New
Communist	Willie Gallacher	10,380	10.1	+5.1
Majority		2,722	2.7	−7.6
Majority		314	0.3	−6.5
Turnout		102,762	72.5	−8.0
Scottish Prohibition hold		Swing		
Labour hold		Swing		

Morel

General election 1924: Dundee (2 seats)
Party	Candidate	Votes	%	±%
Labour	E. D. Morel	32,846	26.5	+3.8
Scottish Prohibition	Edwin Scrymgeour	29,193	23.5	−1.6
Unionist	Frederick William Wallace	28,118	22.7	+3.0
Liberal	Andrew Rae Duncan	25,566	20.6	−1.8
Communist	Bob Stewart	8,340	6.7	−3.4
Majority		4,728	3.8	+3.5
Majority		1,075	0.8	−1.9
Turnout		124,063	83.8	+11.3
Labour hold		Swing		
Scottish Prohibition hold		Swing		

1924 Dundee by-election
Party	Candidate	Votes	%	±%
Labour	Tom Johnston	22,973	69.2	+42.7
Liberal	Ernest Simon	10,234	30.8	+10.2
Majority		12,739	38.4	+34.6
Turnout		33,207	42.4	−41.4
Labour hold		Swing		

Henderson-Stewart

General election 1929: Dundee (2 seats)
Party	Candidate	Votes	%	±%
Scottish Prohibition	Edwin Scrymgeour	50,073	29.2	+5.7
Labour	Michael Marcus	47,602	27.7	+1.2
Liberal	James Henderson-Stewart	33,890	19.8	−0.8
Unionist	Frederick William Wallace	33,868	19.7	−3.0
Communist	Bob Stewart	6,160	3.6	−3.1
Majority		16,183	9.4	+8.6
Majority		13,712	7.9	+4.1
Turnout		171,593	82.5	−1.3
Scottish Prohibition hold		Swing		
Labour hold		Swing		

=== Elections in the 1930s ===
General election 1931: Dundee (2 seats)
Party	Candidate	Votes	%	±%
Liberal	Dingle Foot	52,048	29.6	+9.8
Unionist	Florence Horsbrugh	48,556	27.7	+10.0
Labour	Michael Marcus	32,573	18.6	−9.1
Scottish Prohibition	Edwin Scrymgeour	32,229	18.3	−10.9
Communist	Bob Stewart	10,264	5.8	+2.2
Majority		19,475	11.0	N/A
Majority		16,327	9.4	N/A
Turnout		175,670	84.8	+2.3
Liberal gain from Labour		Swing		
Unionist gain from Scottish Prohibition		Swing		

General election 1935: Dundee (2 seats)
Party	Candidate	Votes	%	±%
Unionist	Florence Horsbrugh	50,542	26.8	−0.9
Liberal	Dingle Foot	49,632	26.4	−3.2
Labour	Michael Marcus	44,457	23.6	+5.0
Labour	Robert Gibson	43,747	23.2	N/A
Majority		6,085	3.2	−6.2
Majority		5,175	2.8	−8.2
Turnout		188,378	84.7	−0.1
Unionist hold		Swing		
Liberal hold		Swing		

=== Elections in the 1940s ===
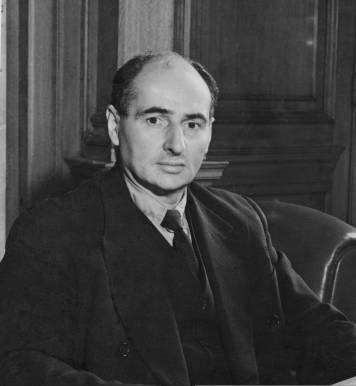
Strachey

General election 1945: Dundee (2 seats)
Party	Candidate	Votes	%	±%
Labour	Thomas Cook	48,804	28.6	+5.0
Labour	John Strachey	48,393	28.4	+5.2
Liberal	Dingle Foot	33,230	19.5	−6.9
Unionist	Florence Horsbrugh	32,309	18.9	−7.9
SNP	Arthur Donaldson	7,775	4.56	New
Majority		15,163	8.9	N/A
Majority		16,084	9.5	N/A
Turnout		170,511	79.2	−5.5
Labour gain from Liberal		Swing		
Labour gain from Unionist		Swing		

== Sources ==
- F. W. S. Craig, British Parliamentary Election Results 1832 – 1885
- F. W. S. Craig, British Parliamentary Election Results 1918 – 1949
- Debrett's House of Commons and the Judicial Bench 1889
- Leigh Rayment's Historical List of MPs – Constituencies beginning with "D" (part 4)
