= G. H. Stuart-Bunning =

British trade unionist

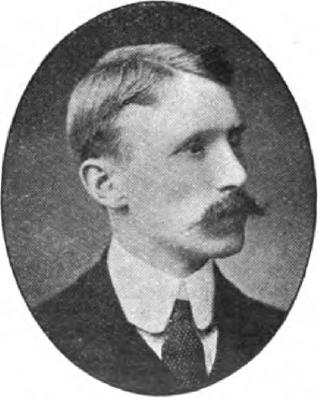
Stuart-Bunning in the mid-1900s

George Harold Stuart-Bunning (1870–1951), born George Harold Stuart, was a British trade unionist.

Born in Oldham, Stuart became a postman and an activist in the Postmen's Federation. He also became active in the Labour Party, and stood unsuccessfully in York at the 1906 general election, then in the 1908 Dundee by-election. Although this second candidature was endorsed by the Scottish section of the party, its National Executive refused to back him, as the party already held the other Dundee seat, and was concerned that it would over-reach itself. Despite this, Keir Hardie spoke on Stuart's platform, and the Dundee Courier enthusiastically reported his criticisms of the ultimately successful Liberal Party candidate, Winston Churchill.

Stuart soon became the Secretary of the Federation and, in 1912, he was the main figure involved in founding the Civil Service Federation, a combination containing more than 100,000 members. Under his leadership, the Postmen's Federation opened up membership to women. Duncan Campbell-Smith describes him as the "single most impressive officer among all the postal union staffs", and he was centrally involved in the formation of the Union of Post Office Workers.

Stuart stood for Parliament again at the 1914 North West Durham by-election, and once more lost to the Liberal candidate. His politics developed over time; at the time of the Dundee election, he was criticised for speaking too little about socialism and for not holding membership of the Independent Labour Party (ILP), but, by 1911, he was regarded as being on the left of the ILP, and was elected to its National Administrative Council, where he worked closely with J. M. McLachlan.

Stuart altered his surname to "Stuart-Bunning" in deference to his uncle, Theodore Bunning, manager of the Beeston Brewery. He served as President of the Trades Union Congress in 1919, but became involved in various disputes, and resigned all his trade union positions later in the year. He instead became the British Labour representative to the International Labour Organization.

Stuart-Bunning was awarded the OBE and was appointed as Chevalier of the Order of the Crown of Belgium. He also served as a Justice of the Peace. In 1928, Stuart-Bunning was appointed as an executor of Theodore Bunning's estate, and he received a large inheritance.

Trade union offices
Preceded by T. Robinson	General Secretary of the Postmen's Federation; 1912–1919	Succeeded by Position abolished
Preceded by John W. Ogden	President of the Trades Union Congress; 1919	Succeeded by J. H. Thomas
