= Alexander Wilkie =

British politician

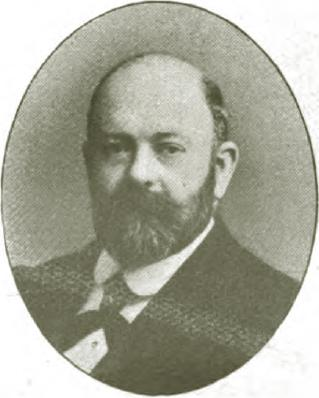
- Wilkie in the mid 1900s

Member of Parliament for Dundee
- In office 8 February 1906 – 26 October 1922 Serving with Edmund Robertson (1906–1908), Winston Churchill (1908–1922)
- Preceded by: John Leng; Edmund Robertson
- Succeeded by: E. D. Morel; Edwin Scrymgeour

Personal details
- Born: 30 September 1850 Fife, Scotland
- Died: 2 September 1928 (aged 77)
- Party: Labour

Alexander Wilkie CH (30 September 1850 – 2 September 1928) was a Labour Party politician in Scotland, best known for his service as a Member of Parliament for Dundee. Along with the Dundonian George Nicoll Barnes, Wilkie was one of the first-ever Labour MPs elected in Scotland.

== Biography ==
Wilkie was born in Fife in 1850 and, until his political career, was a ship carpenter. Wilkie was known for his work in the Labour movement serving as general secretary of the Ship Constructive and Shipwrights Association. He helped to form the Labour Representation Committee and visited the United States as a member of the Mosely Commission in 1902.

He unsuccessfully contested the Sunderland constituency at the 1900 general election but was elected to the House of Commons at the 1906 general election as one of the two Members of Parliament for Dundee. Wilkie's election has been argued to be an important part of a broader process of political change in Dundee, which saw the city's electorate move from supporting the Liberal Party to supporting the Labour Party.

While he was an MP, Wilkie was a trustee of both the University College, Dundee and the Dundee Technical College and School of Art. He also contributed to The Tocsin, a monthly periodical that backed the Labour Party in Dundee and was edited by Joseph Lee.

From 1908 to 1922, his colleague as MP for Dundee was a future British prime minister, then a Liberal MP, Winston Churchill. At the 1918 general election, both Wilkie and Churchill were supported by the local Unionists as well as their own party organisations. In Wilkie's case, that reflected both the fact that his political views had moved to the right since 1914 as well as his support for British involvement in the Great War. The Glasgow Herald noted in 1918 that Wilkie had "never been regarded as a rabid socialist" and had won support from many Liberal voters in the past because of his "moderate" opinions.

It was reported in 1920 that Wilkie would retire at the next general election. Wilkie stood down at the 1922 general election. In the subsequent election not only was Churchill defeated by the only MP to be elected as a prohibitionist but Wilkie was replaced by the considerably more leftwing Labour MP E. D. Morel.

Parliament of the United Kingdom
Preceded by John Leng and Edmund Robertson	Member of Parliament for Dundee; 1906–1922; With: Edmund Robertson 1906–1908; Winston Churchill 1908–1922	Succeeded by Edwin Scrymgeour and E. D. Morel
Trade union offices
Preceded by New position	General Secretary of the Ship Constructive and Shipwrights' Association; 1882–1928	Succeeded by Frank Purdy
Preceded by Will Thorne	Chairman of the Parliamentary Committee of the Trades Union Congress; 1897	Succeeded by W. J. Davis
Preceded by William Inskip and Will Thorne	Trades Union Congress representative to the American Federation of Labour; 1899; With: James Haslam	Succeeded by Pete Curran and John Weir
