= Joseph Bottomley Firth =

English barrister and politician

Firth in 1880

Joseph Firth Bottomley Firth (1842 - 3 September 1889) was an English barrister and Liberal politician who sat in the House of Commons between 1880 and 1889.

== Early life ==
Firth was born as Bottomley in Dobroyd, Yorkshire, the son of Joseph Bottomley of Huddersfield and his wife Ann, the eldest daughter of Joseph Firth. The Bottomleys were a prominent Quaker family in the West Riding of Yorkshire, having been major landowners since the reign of Elizabeth I. He attended Ackworth School and the University of London, where he received a degree in law. He was called to the bar at the Middle Temple and practiced as a barrister on the North Eastern Circuit. In 1873, his uncle, Joseph Firth of Shepley, died, and as part of the conditions of his uncle's will, he adopted the additional surname of "Firth" by royal licence to become Joseph Firth Bottomley Firth.

== Political career ==
Firth was an active campaigner for reform of local government in London and was involved in the Liberal Party. From 1876 to 1879, he was a member of Chelsea on the London School Board. In 1880 he entered the House of Commons as one of two Members of Parliament for Chelsea and held the seat until 1885. Firth was president of the London Municipal Reform League from 1882, and author of Municipal London; or London Government as it is and London Government as it ought to be. At the 1885 general election he stood unsuccessfully at North Kensington and at the 1886 general election at Newington West. In February 1888 Charles Lacaita, one of the sitting Liberal members for Dundee resigned his seat over the Home Rule policy of Gladstone and the Liberals, and Firth was elected in his place.

In 1889, a democratically elected London County Council was created, and Firth was elected as a member of the Progressive majority group. He became the first deputy chairman of the council.

Firth died suddenly from "sun stroke" at the age of 47, while in Switzerland.

Firth married Elizabeth Tatham, daughter of a sometime mayor of Leeds, in 1873.

Parliament of the United Kingdom
Preceded by William Gordon; Sir Charles Dilke	Member of Parliament for Chelsea; 1880 – 1885; With: Sir Charles Dilke	Succeeded by Sir Charles Dilke reduced to one member
Preceded by Charles Lacaita; Edmund Robertson	Member of Parliament for Dundee; 1888 – 1889; With: Edmund Robertson	Succeeded by John Leng; Edmund Robertson
