= George Armitstead, 1st Baron Armitstead =

British businessman, philanthropist and Liberal politician (1824-1915)

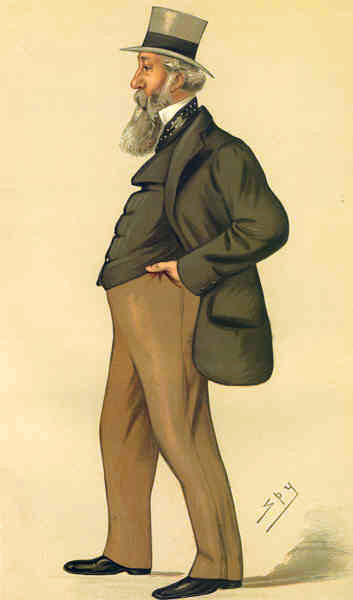
"Spy"'s caricature of George Armitstead, published in Vanity Fair 1882

George Armitstead, 1st Baron Armitstead MP (28 February 1824 in Riga, Governorate of Livonia (now Latvia) – 7 December 1915 in London) was a British businessman, philanthropist and Liberal politician.

== Background and education ==
Armitstead was born on 28 February 1824 at Riga, the second son of an English jute merchant living in Latvia. His grandfather was the vicar of Easingwold in East Riding of Yorkshire and his great-grandfather was a farmer in Austwick, West Riding of Yorkshire. He was educated in Wiesbaden and Heidelberg, Germany.

== Business career ==
He came to Dundee in 1843 and established the George Armitstead & Co shipping line and jute business in which he was senior partner.

== Political career ==
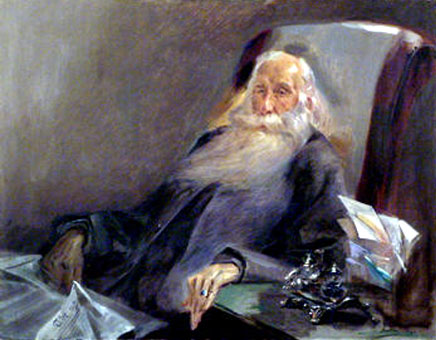
Portrait of Lord Armitstead by John McLure Hamilton (Dundee Art Gallery)

Armitstead was Member of Parliament for Dundee between 1868 and 1873 and from 1880 to 1885. He held the office of justice of the peace (JP) and of deputy lieutenant (DL) of Forfarshire and Dundee. He was invested as a fellow of the Royal Geographical Society (F.R.G.S.).

He donated £5,000 to the Prince of Wales Hospital Fund and shortly afterwards was created Baron Armitstead, of Castlehill in the city of Dundee, on 19 July 1906, by Arthur Balfour, having refused an offer in 1893 by his great friend William Ewart Gladstone. This friendship was significant for both of them, but more comfortable than influential, which is probably why it worked so well. He paid for Gladstone's holidays abroad in Biarritz and Cannes and often accompanied him almost as a paid companion except that Armitstead footed the bill. He is mentioned frequently in Gladstone's diary but without elaboration and was a pallbearer at Gladstone's state funeral.

== Personal life ==
He married Jane Elizabeth Baxter, daughter of Edward Baxter and Euphemia Wilson, (and sister of William Edward Baxter MP) in 1848 but they separated shortly afterwards following a scandalous affair with the daughter of the 15th chieftain of the Clan of MacPherson of Cluny. They had leased Castle Huntly in Longforgan, near Dundee. According to one account, when MacPherson learned of his daughter's affair, he threw her out of the house. Having nowhere else to turn the girl was taken to Castle Huntly by Armitstead. When Lady Armitstead gave her husband an ultimatum, he accepted it and she walked in her nightgown to the lodge where she spent the night. Nevertheless, they remained married until her death on 6 January 1913.

After the collapse of his marriage, Armitstead bought a large house at 4 Cleveland Square in London. Lord Armitstead died at his London residence on 7 December 1915 at the age of 91 and, after cremation at Golders Green Crematorium, his ashes were buried at Western Cemetery, Dundee.

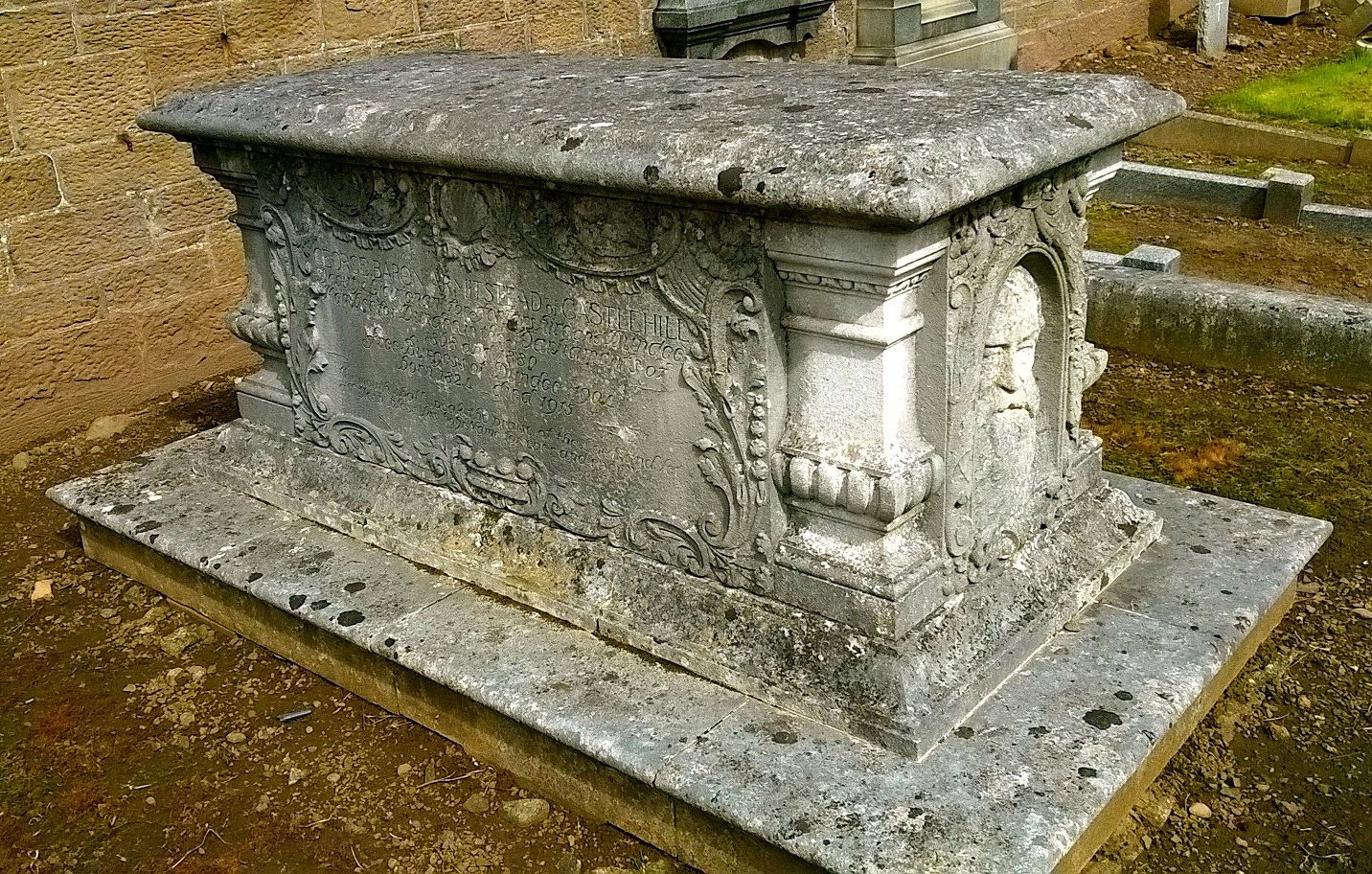
George Baron Armistead of Castlehill, Western Cemetery, Dundee

He was without issue, and on his death the barony became extinct. He bequeathed money for a chair of Philosophy at the University of Dundee and a ward in a hospital. There are several benevolent trusts in the city of Dundee from both Lord and Lady Armitstead. One such trust, founded in 1882, was to support the Botanical Gardens at the University of Dundee and the Armitstead Lectures.

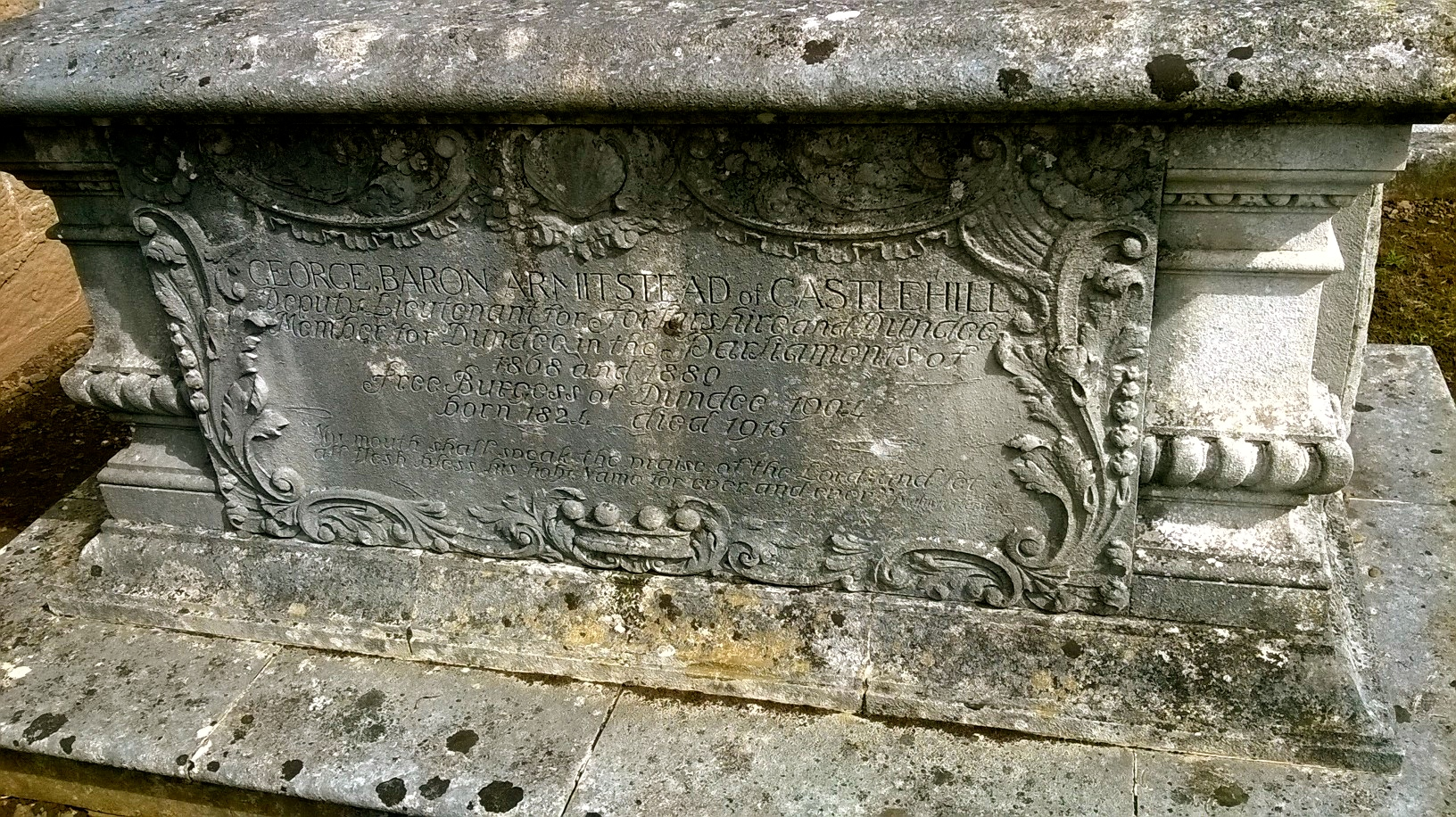
George Baron Armitstead of Castlehill, Western Cemetery, Dundee

His nephew, also George Armitstead (Džordžs Armitsteds in Latvian) (1847–1912), was Mayor of Riga from 1901 to 1912. In 2006, Queen Elizabeth II unveiled a statue of him while on tour in Latvia, in the presence of his great-grandson. His monument is in the gardens close to the Latvian National Opera. Another nephew, Henry Alfred Armitstead, served as a diplomat in Russia and seems to have been involved in an attempt to rescue Tsar Nicholas II after the Russian Revolution.

== Arms ==
Coat of arms of George Armitstead, 1st Baron Armitstead
| Crest A Sinister and a Dexter Arm embowed in Armour each hand grasping a Spear erect proper Escutcheon Or a Chevron embattled Sable between three Pheons Gules a Bordure Sable Supporters Dexter: A Mechanic holding in the exterior hand a Cogged Wheel; Sinister: A Ship's Carpenter holding in the exterior hand a Saw all proper Motto Ever Ready |

Parliament of the United Kingdom
| Preceded by Sir John Ogilvy, Bt | Member of Parliament for Dundee; 1868–1873; With: Sir John Ogilvy, Bt | Succeeded by James Yeaman; Sir John Ogilvy, Bt |
| Preceded by James Yeaman; Edward Jenkins | Member of Parliament for Dundee; 1880–1885; With: Frank Henderson | Succeeded by Edmund Robertson; Charles Lacaita |
Peerage of the United Kingdom
| New creation | Baron Armitstead; 1906–1915 | Extinct |
