= Sir John Ogilvy, 9th Baronet =

Scottish Liberal Party politician

Sir John Ogilvy Bt
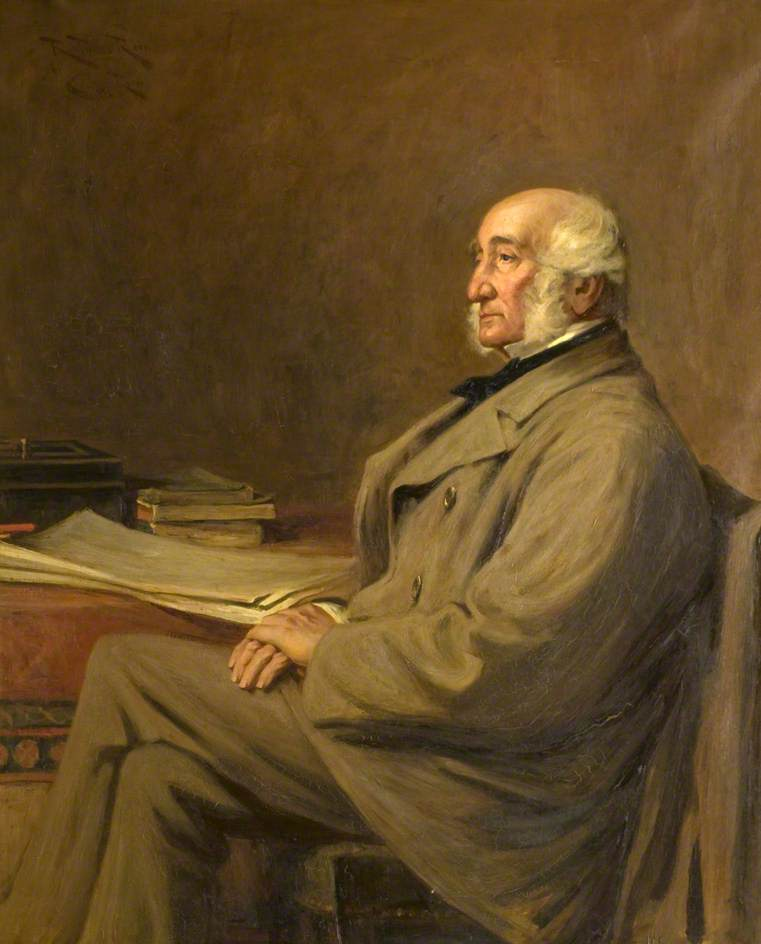
- Sir John Ogilvy, by Robert Payton Reid (after George Reid), painted c. 1885
- Born: 17 March 1803; Edinburgh
- Died: 9 March 1890 (aged 86); Archerfield, East Lothian

Sir John Ogilvy, 9th Baronet (17 March 1803 – 9 March 1890) was a Scottish Liberal Party politician who was MP for Dundee from 1857 to 1874.

== Origins ==
Ogilvy was born at 60 George Street in Edinburgh on 17 March 1803, eldest of the nine children of Rear Admiral (R. N.) Sir William Ogilvy, 8th Baronet (c.1758/58–1823), and his wife, Sarah Morley (Lady Ogilvy). He was educated at Harrow School and Christ Church, Oxford where he matriculated on 5 November 1821. He succeeded to the family baronetcy on the death of his father in 1823.

== Career ==
With his wife Lady Jane Ogilvy, he was largely responsible for the foundation of Baldovan Institute in 1852, Scotland's first residential hospital for learning disabled children. He was closely involved, along with Dr James Arrott, the head physician, in the moving of Dundee Royal Infirmary to a new site, and played a prominent part in the laying of the foundation stone for the new building on 22 July 1852. He also established the Dundee Corn Exchange in 1856.

He made an unsuccessful attempt to represent Montrose in parliament when a by-election was called there in 1855. He had better luck in the general election two years later, when he was elected to represent Dundee.

Ogilvy was MP for Dundee from 1857 to 1874, originally as its sole member, but from 1868 was one of two members representing the town after it became a two-member constituency. He was first elected at the general election of 1857, defeating his future colleague George Armitstead, by 245 votes. In both 1859 and 1865 he was returned unopposed. In the first election for the new two member seat in 1868 he was elected in second place, finishing 77 votes behind Armitstead, but polling over 3,000 votes more than third placed candidate.

== Marriage and progeny ==
Ogilvy married twice. On 7 July 1831 he married Juliana Barbara, the youngest daughter of Lord Henry Howard-Molyneux-Howard, at St George's Hanover Square. The couple had two children before Lady Juliana's death on 27 December 1833 (aged 21):

- Reginald Howard Alexander Ogilvy (1832–1910), 10th Baronet
- Juliana Ogilvy, married Sir Nelson Rycroft, 4th Baronet

Ogilvy remarried on 5 April 1836, to Jane Elizabeth Howard, daughter of Thomas Howard, 16th Earl of Suffolk, in Charlton, Wiltshire. The couple had five children:

- Henry Thomas Ogilvy (1837–1909), Barrister, known as Henry Thomas Nisbet Hamilton Ogilvy after his marriage.
- Charles William Norman Ogilvy (1839–1903), Rector of Hanbury, Worcestershire
- Fanny Henrietta Ogilvy
- Edith Isabel Ogilvy
- Eveline Constance Maud Ogilvy

Lady Jane Ogilvy died on 28 July 1861 (aged 52).

== Death and memorials ==
Sir John died on 9 March 1890 (aged 86) in Archerfield, East Lothian, whilst on a visit to his son Henry Hamilton Ogilvy accompanied by Eveline, his youngest daughter. He was succeeded by his eldest son, Sir Reginald Ogilvy, who died in 1910.

His death was marked by a memorial poem by William McGonagall.

Parliament of the United Kingdom
| Preceded by George Duncan | Member of Parliament for Dundee; 1857–1874; With: George Armitstead 1868–1873; James Yeaman 1873–1874 | Succeeded by James Yeaman; Edward Jenkins |
Baronetage of Nova Scotia
| Preceded by William Ogilvy | Baronet (of Inverquharity); 1823–1890 | Succeeded by Reginald Howard Alexander Ogilvy |
