= Postmen's Federation =

Former trade union of the United Kingdom

- Predecessor: Postmen's Union
- Merged into: Union of Post Office Workers
- Founded: 1891
- Dissolved: 1919
- Headquarters: Parliament Mansions, Victoria Street, London
- Location: United Kingdom
- Members: 31,000 (1906)
- Key people: George Harold Stuart
- Affiliations: TUC, Labour

The Postmen's Federation was a trade union representing postal workers in the United Kingdom.

In 1889, a "Postmen's Union" was founded in Clerkenwell by Tom Dredge and John Lincoln Mahon. This dissolved after many of its members were sacked, but two years later, C. Churchfield established the "Postmen's Federation" as a more cautious organisation. It immediately recruited 3,721 members, and survived, offering welfare benefits to members from 1895 and publishing The Postmen's Gazette.

By 1901, the union was becoming more confident, and felt able to affiliate to the Trades Union Congress and the Labour Representation Committee. Membership was over 31,000 by 1906.

In 1912, George Harold Stuart was elected as general secretary; Duncan Campbell-Smith describes him as the "single most impressive officer among all the postal union staffs". Under his leadership, the union began admitting women. It negotiated a merger with the Fawcett Association and the Postal and Telegraph Clerks' Association in 1919, forming the Union of Post Office Workers.

== General Secretaries ==
1891: Charles Churchfield
1901: Alexander MacLaren
1910: T. Robinson
1912: George Harold Stuart
