= Scottish Prohibition Party =

Scottish political party (1901–1935)

The Scottish Prohibition Party (SPP) was a minor Scottish political party which advocated alcohol prohibition.

The SPP was founded in 1901. In its early years, Bob Stewart acted as the party's full-time organiser. In 1908, Stewart and Edwin Scrymgeour were elected to Dundee Town Council. The leftist Stewart soon had a falling out with the SPP over its religiosity. In 1909-10, he led a Marxist split to form the socialist Prohibition and Reform Party, which merged with the Communist Party of Great Britain in 1920.

From the 1908 by-election onwards, Scrymgeour stood for the SPP in the Dundee constituency. He was finally elected as an MP for Dundee in the 1922 general election, when he and Labour Party candidate E. D. Morel defeated the National Liberal Party candidates, one of whom was future Prime Minister Winston Churchill. On issues other than prohibition, Scrymgeour generally supported Labour's positions. Still, he was the only prohibitionist ever elected to the House of Commons.

Scrymgeour lost his seat in the 1931 general election. The SPP was disbanded in 1935, against the wishes of Scrymgeour.

== See also ==
- National Prohibition Party (UK)
- Prohibition Party; the third longest established party in the United States.
