= Edmund Robertson, 1st Baron Lochee =

British politician

The Right Honourable The Lord Lochee PC KC DL

Parliamentary and Financial Secretary to the Admiralty
- In office 12 December 1905 – 13 April 1908
- Monarch: Edward VII
- Prime Minister: Sir Henry Campbell-Bannerman
- Preceded by: E. G. Pretyman
- Succeeded by: Thomas James Macnamara

Personal details
- Born: 28 October 1845
- Died: 13 September 1911 (aged 65)
- Party: Liberal
- Education: St Andrews University; Corpus Christi College, Oxford

Edmund Robertson, 1st Baron Lochee, PC, KC, DL (28 October 1845 – 13 September 1911) was a Scottish barrister, academic and Liberal politician.

== Background and education ==
Robertson was the son of Edmund Robertson, of Kinnaird, Inchture, Perthshire. He was educated at St Andrews University and Corpus Christi College, Oxford, and became a fellow of Corpus Christi College in 1872 and a Reader on law to the Council of Legal Education. He published on American Home Rule and wrote articles on legal and constitutional subjects for the 9th edition of Encyclopædia Britannica. In 1895 he was made a Queen's Counsel.

== Political career ==
Edmund Robertson c1895

Robertson was Liberal Member of Parliament for Dundee from 1885 to 1908, and held office under Gladstone and Lord Rosebery as Civil Lord of the Admiralty from 1892 to 1895 and under Sir Henry Campbell-Bannerman as Parliamentary Secretary to the Admiralty from 1905 to 1908. He was appointed a Privy Counsellor in 1905 and raised to the peerage as Baron Lochee, of Gowrie in the County of Perth, in 1908.

== Personal life ==
Lord Lochee died in September 1911, aged 65, when the barony became extinct.

Parliament of the United Kingdom
Preceded by George Armitstead; Frank Henderson	Member of Parliament for Dundee; 1885–1908; With: Charles Lacaita 1885–1888; Joseph Bottomley Firth 1888–1889; Sir John Leng 1889–1906; Alexander Wilkie 1906–1908	Succeeded by Alexander Wilkie; Winston Churchill
Political offices
Preceded by Ellis Ashmead-Bartlett	Civil Lord of the Admiralty; 1892–1895	Succeeded by Austen Chamberlain
Preceded by E. G. Pretyman	Parliamentary and Financial Secretary to the Admiralty; 1905–1908	Succeeded by Thomas James Macnamara
Peerage of the United Kingdom
New creation	Baron Lochee; 1908–1911	Extinct
