= Edwin Scrymgeour =

Scottish Prohibition MP (1866–1947)

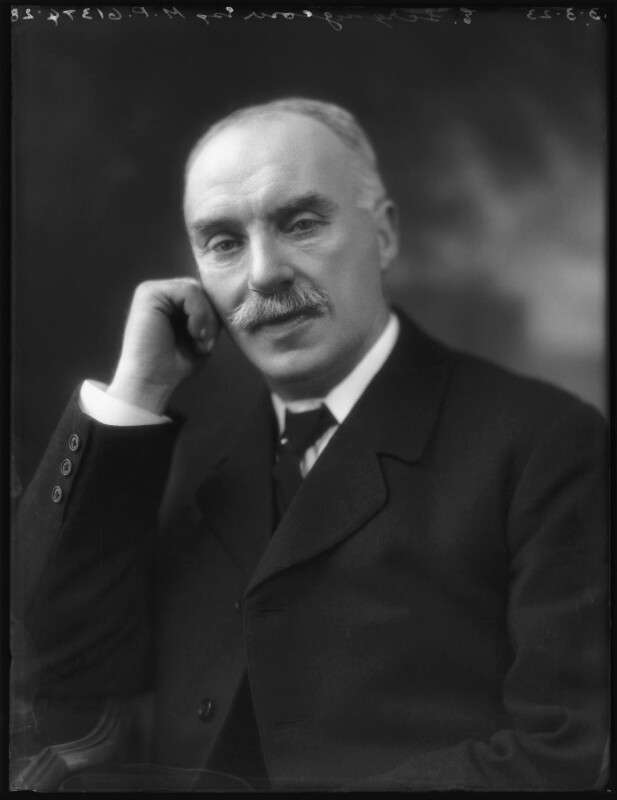

Member of Parliament for Dundee
- In office 15 November 1922 – 8 October 1931 Serving with E. D. Morel, Tom Johnston, Michael Marcus
- Preceded by: Winston Churchill; Alexander Wilkie
- Succeeded by: Florence Horsbrugh; Dingle Foot

Personal details
- Born: 28 July 1866 Dundee, Scotland
- Died: 1 February 1947 (aged 80) Dundee, Scotland
- Party: Scottish Prohibition
- Education: West End Academy

Edwin Scrymgeour (28 July 1866 – 1 February 1947) was a British politician who served as a Member of Parliament (MP) for Dundee in Scotland. He is the only person ever elected to the House of Commons on a prohibitionist ticket, as the candidate of the Scottish Prohibition Party. He was affectionately known as Neddy Scrymgeour.

== Life ==
A native of Dundee, he was educated at West End Academy. He was a pioneer of the Scottish temperance movement and established his party in 1901 to further that aim.

In 1896 he is listed as a clerk, living at 42 Kings Road in Dundee.

He served on Dundee City Council and began contesting elections in the 1908 Dundee by-election, which saw Winston Churchill first elected for Dundee, and Scrymgeour continued to fight at every election thereafter and increased his vote. That was in part because of his popularity, generally left-wing sympathies and history with the labour movement. Churchill's stance against suffragettes may have had an impact in a city that had many women as breadwinners and many men as "kettle-boilers" (househusbands).

In 1910 he was living at 92 Victoria Road in Dundee.

In the 1922 election, Scrymgeour and the Labour candidate, E. D. Morel, jointly ousted Winston Churchill, who had represented the city as a Liberal (to then a Coalition Liberal). Scrymgeour remained an MP for Dundee until the 1931 general election, when he was ousted by Florence Horsbrugh.

Out of Parliament, Scrymgeour worked as an evangelical Chaplain at East House and Maryfield Hospital in Dundee. Scrymgeour was a leader of the unsuccessful opposition to disbanding the Scottish Prohibition Party in 1935.

He died at his home in Dundee on 1 February 1947, followed by his wife Margaret on 28 May. Both were interred alongside Scrymgeour's father James in Dundee's Eastern Cemetery.

Parliament of the United Kingdom
Preceded by Winston Churchill; Alexander Wilkie	Member of Parliament for Dundee; 1922–1931; With: E. D. Morel 1922–1924; Tom Johnston 1924–1929; Michael Marcus 1929–1931	Succeeded by Dingle Foot; Florence Horsbrugh
