= Charles Lacaita =

British botanist and politician

Charles Carmichael Lacaita (1853 – 17 July 1933) was a British botanist and Liberal politician.

Lacaita was the only son of Sir James Philip Lacaita and his wife Maria Clavering Gibson-Carmichael daughter of Sir Thomas Gibson-Carmichael. He was educated at Balliol College, Oxford and was called to the bar at Lincoln's Inn in 1879. He was Assistant Private Secretary to Earl Granville in 1885.

At the 1885 general election, Lacaita was elected as a member of parliament (MP) for Dundee. He was re-elected in 1886, and resigned his seat on 7 February 1888 by the procedural device of accepting the post of Steward of the Chiltern Hundreds. His resignation was reported by The Glasgow Herald to be due to "his strong disapproval of the procedure adopted by the Gladstone Liberals in their Home Rule policy" and reportedly angered Liberal supporters in Dundee. He had written to Ex-Bailie John Robertson, the Chairman of the Dundee Liberal's on 25 November 1887 intimating his intention to resign owing to his objection to what he saw as some Liberals practically encouraging Irish Nationalists pursuing "obstruction in parliament" and "violent agitation and lawlessness in Ireland". He indicated that this meant he could no longer guarantee to support William Gladstone and the Liberal Party in parliament, and as he believed that the majority in Dundee did support Gladstone he felt he should resign.

Lacaita was a botanist of note. He lived at Horsley near Leatherhead and later at Selham, West Sussex. Lacaita died at the age of 80. Lacaita married Mary Annabel Doyle, daughter of Sir Francis Hastings Doyle. Lacaita had nineteen plant species named after him.

- (Asteraceae) Centaurea lacaitae Peruzzi
- (Boraginaceae) Echium lacaitae Sennen
- (Brassicaceae) Draba lacaitae Boiss.
- (Caryophyllaceae) Cerastium lacaitae Barberis, Bechi & Miceli
- (Caryophyllaceae) Silene lacaitae Willk.
- (Cistaceae) Halimiocistus × lacaitae Dans.
- (Lamiaceae) Micromeria lacaitae Lojac.
- (Leguminosae) Lathyrus lacaitae Czefr.
- (Liliaceae) Gagea lacaitae N.Terracc. ex Lojac.
- (Orchidaceae) Ophrys lacaitae Lojac.
- (Plumbaginaceae) Armeria lacaitae (Villar) Rivas Mart.

Parliament of the United Kingdom
Preceded by George Armitstead; Edmund Robertson	Member of Parliament for Dundee; 1885 – 1888; With: Edmund Robertson	Succeeded by Joseph Firth; Edmund Robertson
