= Montrose Burghs by-election =

Montrose Burghs by-election may refer to one several parliamentary by-elections held in Scotland for the British House of Commons constituency of Montrose Burghs:

- 1842 Montrose Burghs by-election, a Montrose Burghs election in the 1840s
- 1855 Montrose Burghs by-election, a Montrose Burghs election in the 1850s
- 1896 Montrose Burghs by-election, a Montrose Burghs election in the 1890s
- 1908 Montrose Burghs by-election
- 1932 Montrose Burghs by-election
- 1940 Montrose Burghs by-election

== See also ==
- Montrose Burghs (UK Parliament constituency)
