= General Hutchison =

General Hutchison may refer to:

- Alexander Richard Hamilton Hutchison (1871–1930), Royal Marines general
- Balfour Hutchison (1889–1967), British Army lieutenant general
- David William Hutchison (1908–1982), United States Air Force major general
- Robert Hutchison, 1st Baron Hutchison of Montrose (1873–1950), British Army major general

== See also ==
- Charles Scrope Hutchinson (1826–1912), British Army major general
- Grote Hutcheson (1862–1948), United States Army major general
- John Hely-Hutchinson, 2nd Earl of Donoughmore (1757–1832), British Army general
- William Nelson Hutchinson (1803–1895), British Army general
