= John Leng (politician) =

British politician

Sir John Leng
- c. 1895

Member of Parliament for Dundee
- In office 1889–1906
- Preceded by: Joseph Firth and Edmund Robertson
- Succeeded by: Alexander Wilkie and Edmund Robertson

Personal details
- Born: 10 April 1828 Hull, United Kingdom
- Died: 13 December 1906 (aged 78) Del Monte, California, U.S.
- Party: Liberal Party
- Spouse(s): Emily Cook; Mary Low
- Relatives: William C. Leng (brother); Frederick Sturrock (grandson); John Leng Sturrock (grandson); John A. L. Sturrock (great-grandson)
- Occupation: Publisher; Member of Parliament

Sir John Leng (10 April 1828 – 13 December 1906) was a newspaper proprietor and Liberal Party politician in Scotland.

== Life ==
He was born at Hull on 10 April 1828, the younger brother of Sir William Christopher Leng. Educated at Hull Grammar School, he acted there as joint editor with Charles Cooper (later the editor of the Scotsman) of a manuscript school magazine.

Becoming assistant teacher at a private school, he sent letters to the Hull Advertiser, which attracted the notice of Edward Francis Collins, then the editor, and led to his appointment in 1847, at the age of 19, as sub-editor and reporter. That post, which embraced dramatic and musical criticism, was held for four years.

In July 1851, Leng was selected from among 70 candidates as editor of the then-biweekly Dundee Advertiser. The paper was founded in 1801 but had fallen into a backward state. Leng soon raised the 'Advertiser' to high rank, both in local and imperial affairs. His wide practical knowledge of newspaper work enabled him to reorganise both the literary staff and machinery. The old premises were quickly found too small, and in 1859, he built the first portion of new premises in Bank Street, which, before his death, attained gigantic proportions. As early as 1852, Leng was made a partner by the proprietors of the Advertiser, and the imprint thenceforth bore the name of John Leng & Co.

After the abolition of the "taxes on knowledge" in 1861, the Advertiser was issued daily. In June 1870, Leng was one of the first Scottish newspaper proprietors to establish an office in Fleet Street, London, with direct telegraphic communication with Dundee. When stereotyping was adopted, after printing from rolls of paper, instead of sheets, was introduced, he caused a stereotype foundry to be erected as a portion of the plant. In 1851 the single machine in use could only produce 350 copies per hour, but fifty years afterwards, Leng had four elaborate machines in operation, each capable of throwing off 20,000 copies per hour. He was the first to attempt illustrations in a daily paper, and when the primitive pantographic method was superseded by zincography, he founded a zincographic and photographic studio as part of the office equipment. The difficulty of obtaining an adequate paper supply was overcome in 1893, when the Donside paper mills were acquired by a private limited liability company of which Leng was the chairman.

Leng proved to be a notable pioneer in other departments of journalistic enterprise. In May 1859, he founded the first half-penny daily newspaper in Scotland, under the title of the Daily Advertiser, but the limited machinery then available compelled him to suspend that venture. In January 1858 he established the People's Journal, a weekly newspaper, which soon reached the largest circulation of any similar paper in Scotland. A literary weekly paper, the People's Friend, was founded by him in 1869, and he lived to see it reach a circulation which rivalled that of London periodicals of its kind. The Evening Telegraph, halfpenny daily newspaper, was started in 1877 and had a successful career, being amalgamated in 1900 with the Evening Post, another local paper.

In 1860, he suggested the introduction of sixpenny telegrams, printing specimen forms similar to those afterwards adopted. In September 1889, on the death of Joseph Firth one of two Member of Parliament for Dundee, Leng was returned without opposition in the liberal interest. He was re-elected by large majorities in 1892, 1896, and 1900. retiring from the House of Commons at its dissolution in 1905.

An advanced radical and a supporter of Home Rule All Round, he made his maiden speech, on 26 March 1890, in support of the Parliamentary Elections (Scotland) bill, which proposed the expenses of returning officers at such elections to be paid out of the rates. Among the topics that he brought before the House of Commons were the excessive hours of railway guards, engine-drivers, and firemen; the appointment of female inspectors of factories and workshops and the boarding-out of pauper children by parochial boards. He was prominent in 1893, in support of the home rule bill of Gladstone, and of the employers' liability bill.

In the same year, he was knighted and was made deputy-lieutenant for the county of the city of Dundee.

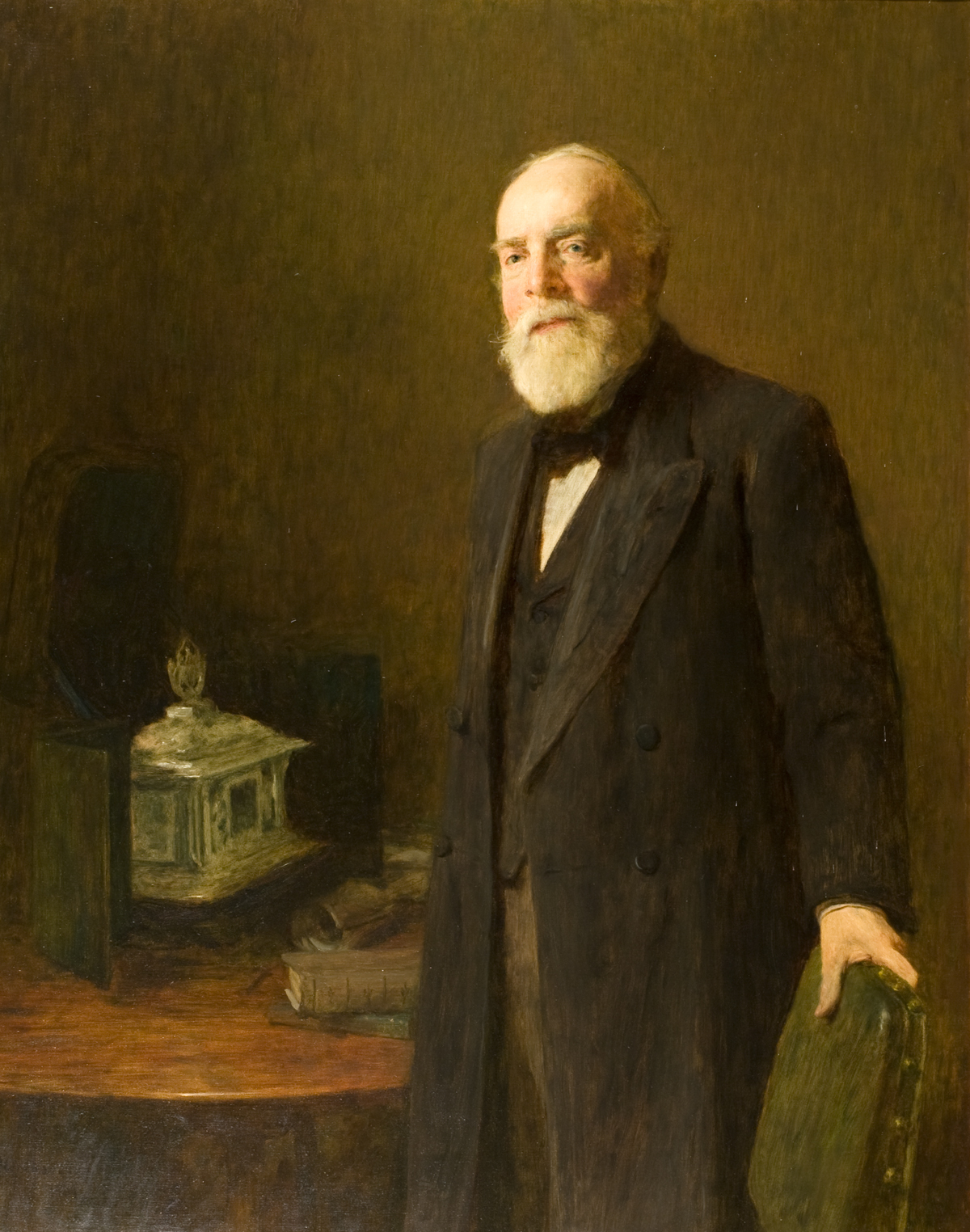
Sir John Leng, by William Quiller Orchardson, 1901

In 1901, he established a trust "to stimulate literary and scientific pursuits amongst the youth of Dundee" and to encourage and promote the teaching of the Songs of Scotland. The trust is still in existence.

He was made an honorary burgess of Dundee in July 1902, and, in 1904, Hon. LL.D. of St. Andrews.

Despite his journalistic and parliamentary activity, he found time for extensive travel. He visited the United States and Canada in 1876 and frequently toured in France, Germany and the Netherlands. His first western journey was recorded in a volume entitled 'America in 1876' (Dundee, 1877), and a visit to India in 1896 was detailed in his book Letters from India and Ceylon (1897), a work that was translated and widely circulated in Germany. Two journeys in the Near East produced Some European Rivers and Cities (1897) and Glimpses of Egypt and Sicily (1902). A second American tour in 1905 was commemorated in Letters from the United States and Canada (1905). In October 1906, he set out on a third tour to America but fell ill at Delmonte, California, and died there on 12 December 1906. His body was cremated and the ashes brought home and interred at Vicarsford cemetery, near Newport-on-Tay, Fife.

== Family ==
Leng married twice: in 1851, to Emily, to the elder daughter of Alderman Cook of Beverley; she died at Kinbrae, Newport, Fife, in 1894, leaving two sons and four daughters. He had the Lady Leng Memorial Chapel built in her memory in Vicarsford. He married in 1897, Mary, daughter of William Low, of Kirriemuir, who survived him.

His grandson was the journalist John Leng Sturrock, who was MP for Montrose Burghs from 1918 to 1924.

His daughter, Clara Beatrice Leng (d. 1941), married the Dundee shipowner William Thomson, the brother of the publisher David Couper Thomson.

== Sources ==
- Porter, Dilwyn (2004). "Leng, Sir William Christopher". Oxford Dictionary of National Biography. Oxford University Press.
- Leigh Rayment's Historical List of MPs

Parliament of the United Kingdom
Preceded by Joseph Firth and Edmund Robertson	Member of Parliament for Dundee; 1889–1906; With: Edmund Robertson	Succeeded by Alexander Wilkie and Edmund Robertson
