= Chief Whip of the Liberal Democrats =

UK political party official

The Chief Whip of the Liberal Democrats is responsible for administering the whipping system in the party which ensures that members attend and vote in parliament when the party leadership requires a majority vote. Whips, of which two are appointed in the party, a member of the House of Commons and a member of the House of Lords, also help to organise their party's contribution to parliamentary business. On some occasions, the party leadership may allow MP's to have a free vote based on their own conscience rather than party policy, of which the chief whip is not required to direct votes.

This is a list of people who have served as Chief Whip of the Liberal Democrats in the Parliament of the United Kingdom and of its predecessor parties. The Liberal Party was formed in 1859, but through its roots in the Whig Party dates back to the late 1670s. In 1988, the Liberals merged with the Social Democratic Party, formed by dissident Labour Party members in 1981, to create the Liberal Democrats.

== House of Commons ==
Chief Whip of the Liberal Democrats

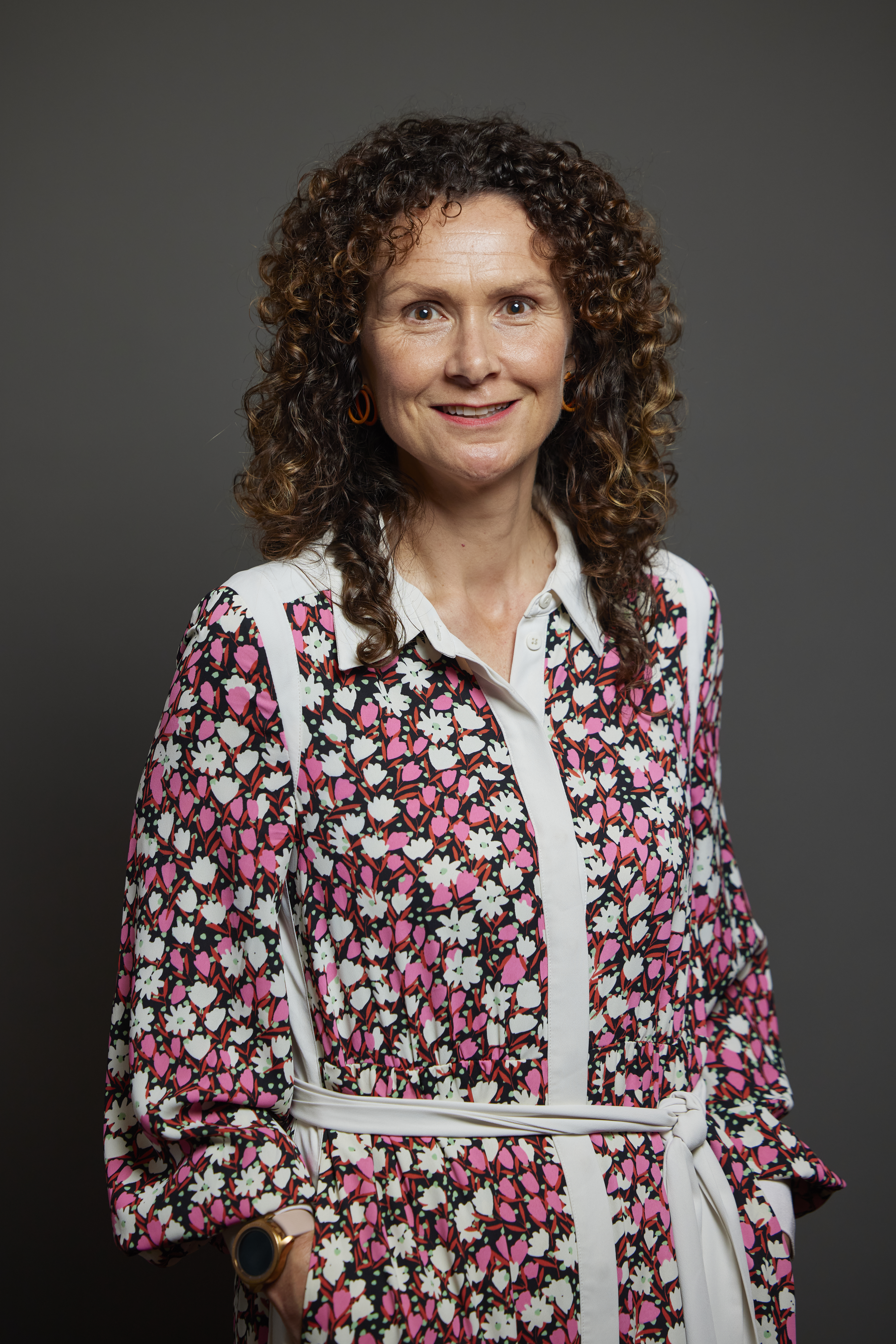
- Incumbent; Wendy Chamberlain MP since 31 August 2020
- Appointer: Leader of the Liberal Democrats
- Inaugural holder: Edward Ellice (Whigs); Henry Bouverie William Brand (Liberal Party); James Wallace (Liberal Democrats)
- Formation: circa 1830 (as Chief Whip of the Whig Party); 1988 (in current form)

=== Whigs ===
| Year | Name | Constituency |
|---|---|---|
| 1830 | Edward Ellice | Coventry |
| 1830 | Charles Wood | Great Grimsby |
| 1834 | Francis Thornhill Baring | Portsmouth |
| 1835 | Edward John Stanley | North Cheshire |
| 1841 | Richard More O'Ferrall | County Kildare |
| 1846 | Henry Tufnell | Plymouth Devonport |
| 1850 | William Goodenough Hayter | Wells |

=== Liberal Party ===
| Year | Name | Constituency |
|---|---|---|
| 1859 | Henry Bouverie William Brand | Lewes |
| 1866 | George Grenfell Glyn | Shaftesbury |
| 1873 | Arthur Wellesley Peel | Warwick |
| 1874 | William Patrick Adam | Clackmannanshire and Kinross-shire |
| 1880 | Lord Richard Grosvenor | Flintshire |
| 1885 | Arnold Morley | Nottingham East |
| 1892 | Edward Marjoribanks | Berwickshire |
| 1894 | T. E. Ellis | Merioneth |
| 1900 | Herbert Gladstone | Leeds West |
| 1905 | George Whiteley | Pudsey |
| 1908 | Joseph Pease | Saffron Walden |
| 1910 | The Master of Elibank | Midlothian |
| 1912 | Percy Illingworth | Shipley |
| 1915 | John Gulland | Dumfries Burghs |
| 1923 | Vivian Phillipps | Edinburgh West |
| 1924 | Sir Godfrey Collins | Greenock |
| 1926 | Sir Robert Hutchinson | Montrose Burghs |
| 1930 | Archibald Sinclair | Caithness and Sutherland |
| 1931 | Goronwy Owen | Caernarvonshire |
| 1932 | Walter Rea | Dewsbury |
| 1935 | Sir Percy Harris | Bethnal Green South West |
| 1945 | Tom Horabin | North Cornwall |
| 1946 | Frank Byers | North Dorset |
| 1950 | Jo Grimond | Orkney and Shetland |
| 1956 | Donald Wade | Huddersfield West |
| 1962 | Arthur Holt | Bolton West |
| 1963 | Eric Lubbock | Orpington |
| 1970 | David Steel | Roxburgh, Selkirk and Peebles |
| 1976 | Cyril Smith | Rochdale |
| 1977 | Alan Beith | Berwick-upon-Tweed |
| 1985 | David Alton | Liverpool Mossley Hill |
| 1987 | Jim Wallace^{1} | Orkney and Shetland |

- ^{1} Wallace continued as Liberal Democrat Chief Whip following the merger

=== Social Democratic Party ===
| Year | Name | Constituency |
|---|---|---|
| 1981 | John Roper | Farnworth |
| 1983 | John Cartwright | Woolwich |

=== Liberal Democrats ===
| Year | Name | Constituency |
|---|---|---|
| 1988 | Jim Wallace | Orkney and Shetland |
| 1992 | Archy Kirkwood | Roxburgh and Berwickshire |
| 1997 | Paul Tyler | North Cornwall |
| 2001 | Andrew Stunell | Hazel Grove |
| 2006 | Paul Burstow | Sutton and Cheam |
| 2010 | Alistair Carmichael | Orkney and Shetland |
| 2013 | Don Foster | Bath |
| 2015 | Tom Brake | Carshalton and Wallington |
| 2017 | Alistair Carmichael | Orkney and Shetland |
| 2020 | Wendy Chamberlain | North East Fife |

== House of Lords ==
Chief Whip of the Liberal Democrats

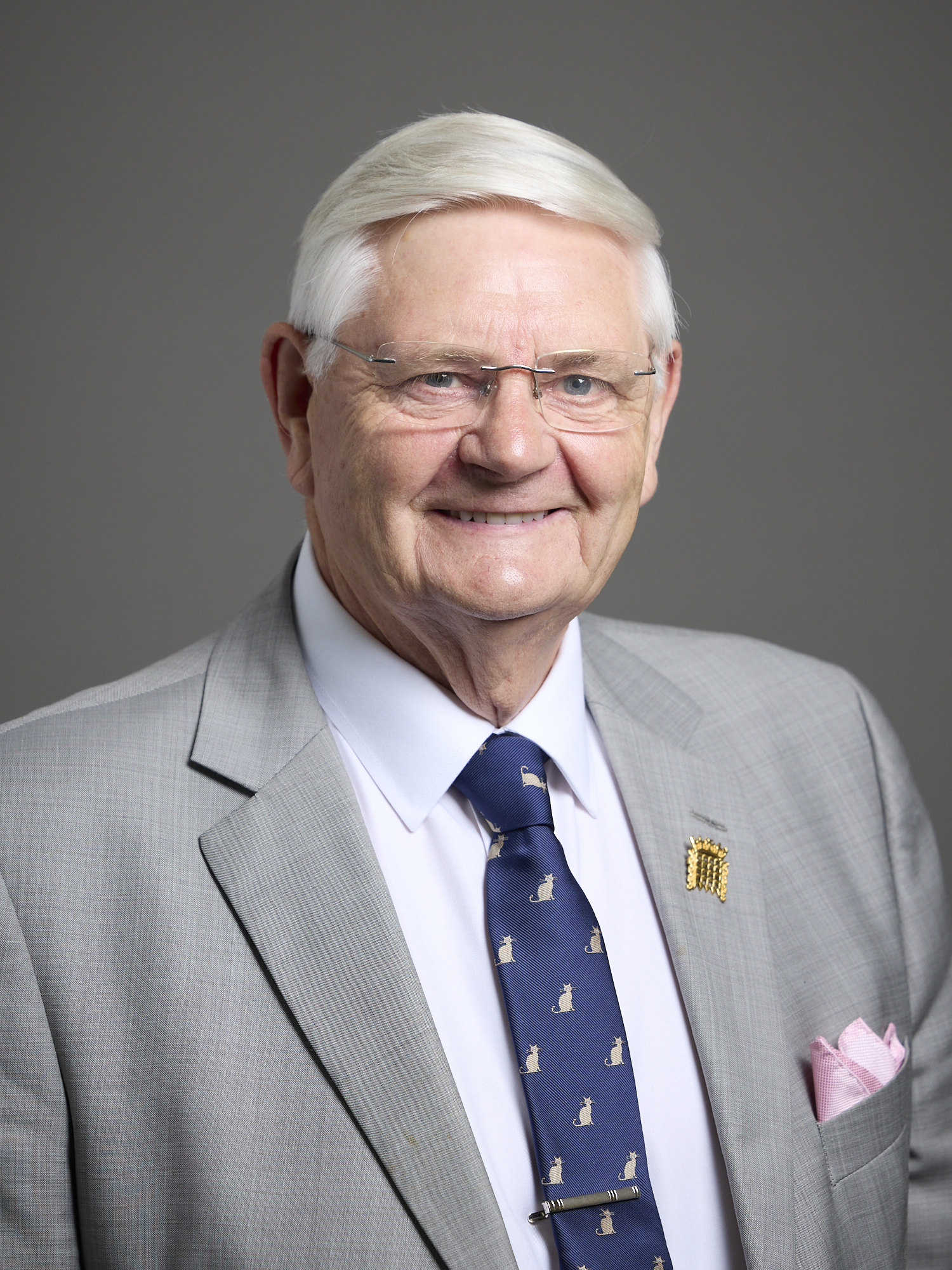
- Incumbent; David Goddard, Baron Goddard of Stockport since 2026
- Appointer: Leader of the Liberal Democrats
- Inaugural holder: The Viscount Falkland (Whigs); The Lord Tordoff (Liberal Democrats)
- Formation: circa 1837 (as Chief Whip of the Whig Party); 1988 (in current form)

=== Whigs ===
| Year | Name |
|---|---|
| 1837 | The Viscount Falkland |
| 1840 | none^{1} |
| 1846 | The Viscount Falkland |
| May 1848 | The Earl of Bessborough |

=== Liberal Party ===
| Year | Name |
|---|---|
| 1859 | The Earl of Bessborough |
| Jan 1880 | The Lord Monson (created Viscount Oxenbridge in 1886) |
| Aug 1892 | The Lord Kensington |
| Oct 1896 | The Lord Ribblesdale |
| May 1907 | The Lord Denman |
| 1911 | The Lord Colebrooke |
| 1922 | none^{2} |
| 1924 | The Lord Stanmore |
| 1944 | The Viscount Mersey |
| 1949 | The Marquess of Willingdon |
| 1950 | The Lord Moynihan |
| 1950 | The Lord Rea |
| 1955 | The Lord Amulree |
| 1977 | The Lord Wigoder |
| 1984 | The Lord Tordoff^{3} |

- ^{1} Falkland was absent serving as Governor of Nova Scotia
- ^{2} Colebrooke continued as Liberal Chief Whip in the Lloyd George coalition of 1916 to 1922. Denman was Chief Whip of the Opposition Asquith Liberals from 1919 to 1924
- ^{3} Tordoff continued as Liberal Democrat Chief Whip following the merger

=== Social Democratic Party ===
| Year | Name |
|---|---|
| 1981 | The Lord Kennet |
| 1983 | The Lord Kilmarnock |
| 1986 | The Baroness Stedman |

=== Liberal Democrats ===
| Year | Name |
|---|---|
| 1988 | The Lord Tordoff |
| 1994 | The Lord Harris of Greenwich |
| 2001 | The Lord Roper |
| 2005 | The Lord Shutt of Greetland |
| 2012 | The Lord Newby |
| 2016 | The Lord Stoneham of Droxford |
| 2026–present | The Lord Goddard of Stockport |

== Chief Whips of the National Liberal Party (Coalition Liberals), 1916–1923 ==
| Year | Name | Constituency |
|---|---|---|
| 1916 | Neil James Archibald Primrose | Wisbech |
| 1916 | Freddie Guest | East Dorset |
| 1921 | Charles McCurdy | Northampton |
| 1922 | Edward Hilton Young | Norwich |

== Chief Whips of the Liberal National Party (later National Liberal Party), 1931–1966 ==
| Year | Name | Constituency |
|---|---|---|
| 1931 | Alec Glassey | East Dorset |
| 1931 | Geoffrey Shakespeare | Norwich |
| 1932 | James Blindell (knighted in 1936) | Holland with Boston |
| 1937 | Charles Kerr | Montrose Burghs |
| 1940 | Herbert Holdsworth | Bradford South |
| 1945 | Herbert Butcher (knighted in 1953; created a Baronet in 1960) | Holland with Boston |

== See also ==
- Chief Whip of the Conservative Party
- Chief Whip of the Labour Party
- Chief Whip of Reform UK
