= Robert Harcourt =

Robert Harcourt may refer to:

- Robert Harcourt (unionist politician) (1902–1969), Northern Irish politician
- Robert Harcourt (explorer) (c. 1574–1631), English explorer of Guiana
- Robert Harcourt (Liberal politician) (1878–1962), British diplomat, playwright, and MP
- Robert Harcourt, multiple nobles, see House of Harcourt
