= Baron Teviot =

Barony in the Peerage of the United Kingdom

Baron Teviot, of Burghclere in the County of Southampton, is a title in the Peerage of the United Kingdom. It was created in 1940 for Charles Kerr, who had previously represented the Montrose Burghs in the House of Commons, and served as Chief Whip for the National Liberal Party, and government whip and Comptroller of the Household in the National Government. He later served as Chairman of the National Liberals. Kerr was a grandson of Lord Charles Lennox Kerr, fourth son of William Kerr, 6th Marquess of Lothian. The title was then held by his only son, the second Baron, who succeeded in 1968. After Eton, he worked first as a bus driver and then as a "bacon hand" at Sainsbury's in Hove. On succeeding to the title, he left the shop for the House of Lords, which he ascertained to be better paid work; from 1987 to 1990 he was President of the Institute of Transport Management, and was also a genealogist, being a Fellow of the Society of Genealogists and a director of Debrett's Peerage Ltd.

== Barons Teviot (1940) ==
- Charles Iain Kerr, 1st Baron Teviot (1874–1968)
- Charles John Kerr, 2nd Baron Teviot (1934–2023)
- Charles Robert Kerr, 3rd Baron Teviot (born 1971)

The third Baron has three daughters, but under current male primogeniture rules, there is no heir to the title.

== Arms ==
Coat of arms of Baron Teviot
Crest A stag's head erased Proper. Escutcheon Quarterly 1st & 4th Gules on a chevron Argent three mullets of the field (Kerr of Ferniehurst) 2nd & 3rd per fess Gules and Vert on a chevron Argent between three mascles in chief Or and a unicorn's head in base of the third horned of the fourth three mullets of the first (Kerr of Cessford) in the centre of the quarters a rose Or. Supporters Two border terriers Proper. Motto Sero Sed Serio (Late But In Earnest)

== See also ==
- Marquess of Lothian
- Earl of Teviot
