= Panner =

Panner may refer to:

- Israel Panner (1909–1973), Austrian/British journalist
- Owen M. Panner (1924-2018), American judge
- Gold-panner, a person who engages in panning for gold
- Palfuria panner, a spider species of the family Zodariidae
- Panner disease, an orthopedic disease of the elbow

== See also ==
- Paneer, a fresh cheese
- Panning (disambiguation)
