= Baron Hutchison =

Baron Hutchison may refer to:

- A subsidiary title of the Earldom of Donoughmore in the Peerage of the United Kingdom
- The Baron Hutchison of Montrose, title created in the Peerage of the United Kingdom in 1932 for Robert Hutchison, former MP
