= John Carnegie =

John Carnegie may refer to:

- John Carnegie, 1st Earl of Northesk (1611–1667), Scottish earl
- John Carnegie (Jacobite) (c. 1679 – bef. 1750), lord of Boysack, Scottish advocate and Jacobite
- John Carnegie (1837–1910), politician in Ontario, Canada
- John Carnegie (Labour politician), (1860–1928), Scottish politician
- John Hilliard Carnegie (1865–1937), Canadian politician
- John Carnegie, 12th Earl of Northesk (1895–1975), World War I army officer and Scottish earl
