= John Sturrock (politician) =

British politician (1878–1943)

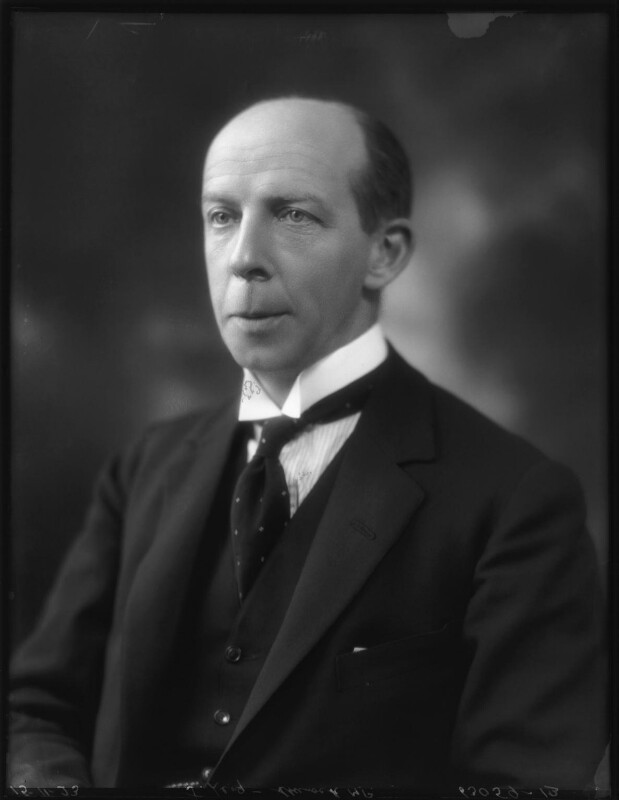

Member of Parliament for Montrose Burghs
- In office 14 December 1918 – 9 October 1924
- Preceded by: Robert Harcourt
- Succeeded by: Robert Hutchison

Personal details
- Born: 23 August 1878 Newport-on-Tay, Fife, Scotland
- Died: 22 July 1943 (aged 64) Dundee, Scotland
- Party: Liberal
- Relatives: John Leng (grandfather); William C. Leng (great-uncle); Frederick C. Sturrock (brother); John A. L. Sturrock (son)

John Leng Sturrock (23 August 1878 – 22 July 1943) was a Scottish newspaper publisher and Liberal politician.

== Family and education ==
John Leng Sturrock was born in Newport-on-Tay, Fife. He was educated at the High School of Dundee and at University College, Dundee. In 1925 he married Winifred, the daughter of William Anning JP of Torquay. They had one son and a daughter. Sturrock's grandfather was Sir John Leng, a journalist and newspaper proprietor, who was Member of Parliament for Dundee from 1899 to 1906. His great-uncle was Sir William Christopher Leng, who was also a newspaperman and active in Conservative politics in Sheffield. He owed his middle name to the Leng family connection and sometimes hyphenated his surname to Leng-Sturrock. His son was the writer John Sturrock.

== Career ==
Sturrock followed the family trade and was himself originally a journalist but later entered the newspaper publishing business and became managing director of John Leng & Co. Ltd, newspaper publishers.

== Politics ==
=== Coalition MP ===
Sturrock was selected as Coalition Liberal candidate - that is as a supporter of the Coalition government of David Lloyd George - for Montrose Burghs for the 1918 general election. He faced no Independent Asquithian Liberal candidate and the Unionists did not oppose him, so he presumably received the Coalition coupon. He won the seat in a straight fight with another journalist, Labour candidate H.N. Brailsford by 9,309 votes to 2,940 a majority of 6,369.

=== 1922-1924 ===
Sturrock held his seat at the 1922 general election, this time standing as a National Liberal i.e. a supporter of the Lloyd George wing of the Liberal Party. However he was unable to take part in the campaign due a serious illness. He again faced no challenge from the Conservatives or the Independent Liberals but this was a much tighter contest against a new Labour candidate Mr. J Carnegie. Sturrock received 8,407 votes to Carnegie's 7,044 a majority of 1,363. He again defeated Carnegie in a straight fight in the 1923 general election, this time gaining 8,717 votes to Carnegie's 7,032 a majority of 1,685.

From 1920 to 1922 he was secretary to the Coalition Liberals in the House of Commons.

=== Constitutionalist ===
Sturrock stood down from Montrose Burghs at the 1924 general election and contested Tottenham North as a Constitutionalist. He lost narrowly to Labour Co-operative candidate Robert Morrison by 557 votes. Although there was never a Constitutionalist Party with a central organisation, a number of candidates stood under this label in 1924 in constituencies where local Conservative and Liberal parties collaborated and where individual Liberals received Tory support against socialism. The best known of these candidates was Winston Churchill who had fought a by-election at Abbey Division of Westminster in March 1924 as a Constitutionalist and who then contested Epping in Essex at the general election in October 1924 under the same banner.

== Death ==
Sturrock died on 22 July 1943 aged 65 years in a Dundee nursing home.

Parliament of the United Kingdom
Preceded by Robert Harcourt	Member of Parliament for Montrose Burghs; 1918 – 1924	Succeeded by Robert Hutchison
