= Patrick Chalmers (MP) =

British politician (1802-1854)

Patrick Chalmers FSA

Member of Parliament (MP) for Montrose Burghs
- In office 1835–1842
- Preceded by: Horatio Ross
- Succeeded by: Joseph Hume

Personal details
- Born: 31 October 1802 Aldbar Castle, Brechin, Scotland
- Died: 23 June 1854 (aged 51)
- Party: Radical
- Education: The Queen's College, Oxford

Patrick Chalmers FSA (31 October 1802 – 23 June 1854) was a British soldier, writer and politician.

He was the son of another Patrick Chalmers, a merchant from Aldbar, from whom he inherited Aldbar Castle, near Brechin. After being educated in Germany he studied at the Queen's College in Oxford University from 1818, though he left before obtaining a degree. He then joined the army, serving in Ireland as part of the 3rd Dragoon Guards, where he rose to the rank of captain. In 1826, after his father's death, he sold his commission and returned to Aldbar. In 1832 he attempted to run for office as the member of parliament for Montrose Burghs, but was defeated by Horatio Ross. He ran again in 1835 and succeeded, being re-elected in 1837 and 1841. In 1842 he was forced to resign due to ill-health, having an unidentified disease at the base of his spine, becoming the first Member of Parliament to be appointed as Steward of the Manor of Northstead.

In later life he became a notable antiquary, being appointed a fellow of the Society of Antiquaries of London on 24 January 1850 and writing a book The Sculptured Monuments of the County of Angus describing work he had come across. His health returned in later years, with some suggesting that he run for re-election in the next general election, but on a journey with some young relatives on a continental tour in 1854 he was struck by smallpox, immediately followed by a second bout of the spinal disease that had forced him to resign. Under the care of doctors not familiar with him, he contracted dysentery, of which he died on 23 June. The 16th-century Aldbar Castle was extended by Chalmers between 1843 and 1854, but demolished in 1965.

Parliament of the United Kingdom
Preceded by Horatio Ross	Member of Parliament for Montrose Burghs; 1835 – 1842	Succeeded by Joseph Hume
