= William Edward Baxter =

Scottish businessman, Liberal politician and travel writer

The Right Honourable William Edward Baxter
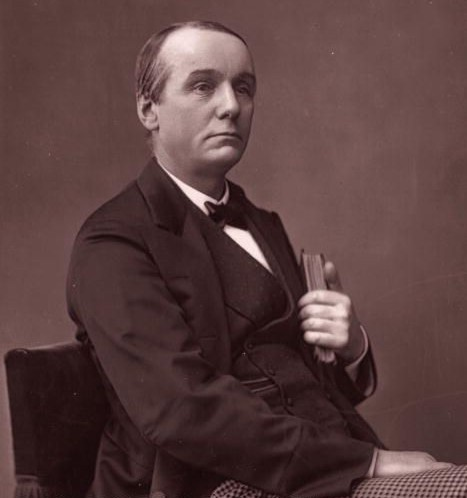

Financial Secretary to the Treasury
- In office 17 March 1871 – 11 August 1873
- Monarch: Victoria
- Prime Minister: William Ewart Gladstone
- Preceded by: James Stansfeld
- Succeeded by: John George Dodson

Personal details
- Born: 24 June 1825 Dundee, Angus
- Died: 10 August 1890 (aged 65)
- Party: Liberal later Liberal Unionists
- Education: High School of Dundee, University of Edinburgh

William Edward Baxter (24 June 1825 – 10 August 1890) was a Scottish businessman, Liberal politician and travel writer.

== Background and education ==
Born in Dundee, Angus, Baxter was educated at the High School of Dundee and the University of Edinburgh. He was the son of Edward Baxter, a benefactor and reformer who had opposed the corn laws. He became a partner in his father's firm of Edward Baxter & Co. (afterwards W. E. Baxter & Co.).

== Political career ==
Baxter was Liberal Member of Parliament for Montrose Burghs from 1855 to 1885, and served under William Ewart Gladstone as Secretary to the Admiralty from 1868 to 1871 and as Financial Secretary to the Treasury from 1871 to 1873. He was appointed a Privy Councillor in 1873. He was also President of the first day of the 1883 Co-operative Congress.

He retired from Parliament in 1885. When the Liberal Party split over the issue of Irish Home Rule in 1886, Baxter supported the Unionist faction until his death.

== Family ==
William Edward Baxter was the grandson of William Baxter, the founder of the Baxter Brothers textile business. His uncle, Sir David Baxter, was a noted businessman and philanthropist and his aunt, Mary Ann Baxter was the co-founder of University College, Dundee.

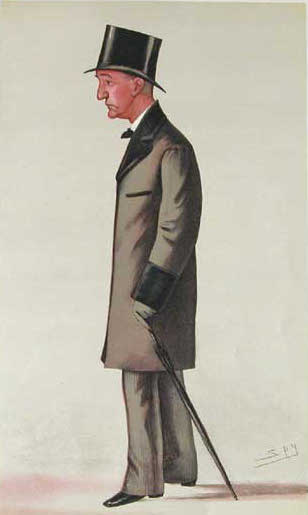
Baxter caricatured by Spy in Vanity Fair, 1885

W. E. Baxter's eldest son was Edward Armitstead Baxter who married Isobel Scott-Elliot. His second son, Sir George Washington Baxter (1853–1926), followed his father into politics, being a leading figure in the Unionist Party in Scotland in the early 20th-century. In 1908 he sought election in Dundee as a Liberal Unionist candidate, but was defeated by the Liberal Winston Churchill. Sir George, was active in the running of the Liberal Unionist and Unionist Parties in Dundee, served as President of the Scottish Unionist Association in 1920. Sir George also continued the family involvement with University College, serving as its president.

== Writings ==
Baxter published various works on foreign travel.

- Impressions of Central and Southern Europe, London, 1850, 8vo.
- The Tagus and the Tiber, or Notes of Travel in Portugal, Spain, and Italy, London, 1852, 2 vols. 8vo.
- America and the Americans, London, 1855, 8vo.
- Hints to Thinkers, or Lectures for the Times, London, 1860, 8vo.

== Personal life ==
After a long period of ill health, W. E. Baxter died at his home, Kincaldrum House, near Forfar in August 1890.

In November 1847, he married Janet, eldest daughter of J. Home Scott, a solicitor of Dundee. By her he had two sons and five daughters.

Parliament of the United Kingdom
Preceded by Joseph Hume	Member of Parliament for Montrose Burghs; 1855 – 1885	Succeeded by John Shiress Will
Political offices
Preceded by Lord Henry Lennox	First Secretary to the Admiralty; 1868–1871	Succeeded by George Shaw-Lefevre (Parliamentary Secretary to the Admiralty)
Preceded by James Stansfeld	Financial Secretary to the Treasury; 1873–1873	Succeeded by John George Dodson
