= Clan Young =

Scottish clan

- Òg
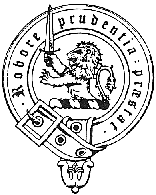
- Motto: Robore Prudentia Praestat (Prudence Excels Strength)

Profile
- Region: Scottish Borders and Scottish Lowlands
- District: Roxburghshire Kincardineshire Angus
- Clan Young no longer has a chief, and is an armigerous clan

Clan Young is a Scottish clan. The clan does not currently have a clan chief and therefore it is considered an armigerous clan.

== History ==
=== Origins of the clan ===
The name Young is clearly personal and descriptive, however it may have also been applied to distinguish a father from a son if both had the same Christian name. In this case the name in Scotland is synonymous with Younger, which was used to describe the heir to a feudal title. Earliest records of the name in Scotland include Malmor and Ade Young who appear at Dumbarton in 1271. In 1342 John Young of Dingwall witnessed a charter by the Earl of Ross to Reginald who was the son of the Lord of the Isles.

=== 15th, 16th, 17th and 18th centuries ===
In 1439 Alexander Young was chaplain to the House of the Holy Trinity in Aberdeen. Peter Young became assistant preceptor to the three-year-old James VI of Scotland, upon the recommendation of the Regent Moray in 1569. He was knighted at Whitehall in 1605. Peter Young had a large family with his first wife, Elizabeth Gibb, a gentlewoman in the household of Anne of Denmark. Several of their children enjoyed royal patronage. One of his sons, another Peter, was part of the Embassy in 1628 to Gustavus Adolphus of Sweden. Sir Peter Young was succeeded by his eldest son, Sir James Young, who held extensive grants of land in Ireland. As a result, the surname Young has become common in the counties of Antrim, Tyrone, Down and Londonderry. The descendants of Peter Young married into numerous prominent families. In 1670 the family sold their original estate in Easter Seton and purchased the lands of Auldbar. The estates were again sold in 1743 this time to William Chalmers of Hazlehead, who was related by marriage to the Youngs.

== Later clansmen ==
Peter Young (d.1988) was a distinguished military historian who was awarded the Military Cross three times and was for a time commander of the Ninth Arab Legion, an elite unit of the kingdom of Jordan. In 1968 he formed the Sealed Knot Society, a military history society, dedicated to the study of the English Civil War and the Scottish Wars of the Covenant. This Peter Young was a descendant of the Youngs of Auldbar.

== Clan castles ==
- Rue Castle, near Jedburgh, in the Scottish Borders, is the site of a castle once held by the Youngs that was torched by the English in 1513 and 1545.
- Auldbar Castle, near Brechin, Angus was held by the Clan Lyon before passing to the Youngs and then to the Chalmers of Balnacraig.
- Harburn Castle, near West Calder, West Lothian was built by the Youngs in 1804 but is now a hotel and conference centre.
