= John Maclay, 1st Viscount Muirshiel =

British politician

The Right Honourable The Viscount Muirshiel KT CH CMG PC DL
- 1962 portrait

Secretary of State for Scotland
- In office 13 January 1957 – 13 July 1962
- Prime Minister: Harold Macmillan
- Preceded by: The Hon. James Stuart
- Succeeded by: Michael Noble

Minister of State for the Colonies
- In office 18 October 1956 – 13 January 1957
- Prime Minister: Anthony Eden
- Preceded by: John Hare
- Succeeded by: John Drummond

Minister of Civil Aviation
- In office 31 October 1951 – 7 May 1952
- Prime Minister: Winston Churchill
- Preceded by: David Rees-Williams
- Succeeded by: Alan Lennox-Boyd

Chairman of the National Liberal Party
- In office 1947–1956
- Preceded by: Stanley Holmes
- Succeeded by: James Duncan

Member of Parliament for West Renfrewshire
- In office 23 February 1950 – 25 September 1964
- Preceded by: Thomas Scollan
- Succeeded by: Norman Buchan

Member of Parliament for Montrose Burghs
- In office 5 July 1940 – 3 February 1950
- Preceded by: Charles Kerr
- Succeeded by: Constituency abolished

Member of the House of Lords
- Lord Temporal
- In office 17 July 1964 – 17 August 1992
- Preceded by: Peerage created
- Succeeded by: Peerage extinct

Personal details
- Born: 26 October 1905 Glasgow, Scotland
- Died: 17 August 1992 (aged 86) Kilmacolm, Scotland
- Party: National Liberal; Scottish Unionist
- Spouse: Betty Astley (m. 1930; died 1974)
- Education: Trinity College, Cambridge

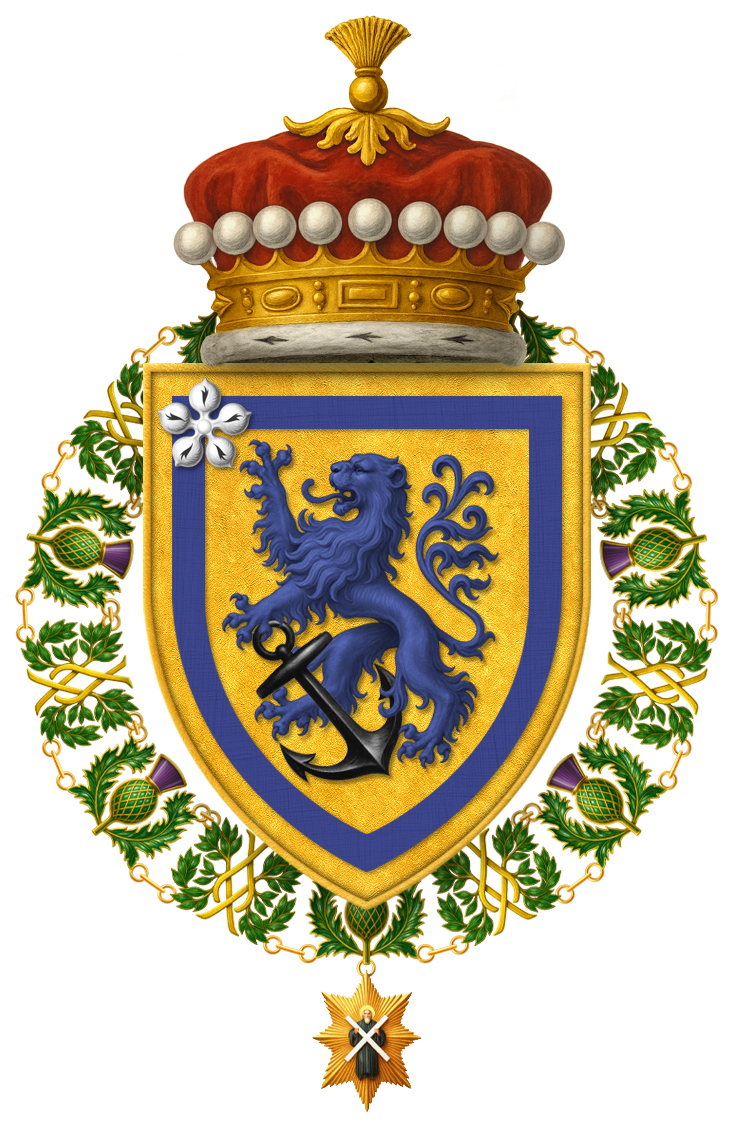
Shield of Arms of John Scott Maclay, 1st Viscount Muirshiel, KT, CH, CMG, PC, DL

John Scott Maclay, 1st Viscount Muirshiel (26 October 1905 – 17 August 1992), was a British politician, sitting as a National Liberal and Conservative Member of Parliament before the party was fully assimilated into the Unionist Party in Scotland in the mid-1960s.

Lord Muirshiel served as Secretary of State for Scotland from 1957 to 1962 within Harold Macmillan's Conservative government, having held a number of junior ministerial posts beforehand. In 1964, he was elevated to the House of Lords.

== Background and education ==
Maclay was born in Glasgow in 1905, the fifth son of Joseph Maclay, 1st Baron Maclay, and the younger brother of Joseph Maclay, 2nd Baron Maclay. He was educated at Winchester and Trinity College, Cambridge, and was bowman in the victorious Cambridge boat in the 1927 Boat Race. At Cambridge, he was also a member of the University Pitt Club.

== Political career ==
In 1940 Maclay was elected in a wartime by-election as Member of Parliament (MP) for Montrose Burghs. During the Second World War, he led the British Merchant shipping Mission to Washington, D.C., leading to his appointment to the Order of St Michael and St George as a Companion (CMG) in the 1944 Birthday Honours. In 1945 he briefly served as Parliamentary Private Secretary to the Minister of Production. He retained his Montrose seat at the 1945 general election. During the 1945 to 1951 Labour government, he led the National Liberals in the House of Commons. The Montrose Burghs constituency was abolished for the 1950 general election, and Maclay was instead returned for West Renfrewshire, a seat he held until 1964. He served under Winston Churchill as Minister of Civil Aviation and Minister of Transport between October 1951 and May 1952. In 1952 he was admitted to the Privy Council.

Maclay remained out of office until October 1956 when he was appointed Minister of State for the Colonies by Sir Anthony Eden. When Harold Macmillan became Prime Minister in January 1957, he was made Secretary of State for Scotland with a seat in the cabinet. He continued in this post until July 1962, when he was a victim of the "Night of the Long Knives", when one-third of the Cabinet lost their ministries. In 1964 Maclay was raised to the peerage as Viscount Muirshiel, of Kilmacolm in the County of Renfrew. He had been made a Member of the Order of the Companions of Honour in 1962 and was made a Knight of the Thistle in 1973. From 1967 to 1980 he served as Lord-Lieutenant of Renfrewshire.

== Personal life ==
Lord Muirshiel married Betty, daughter of Delaval Graham L'Estrange Astley, in 1930; they were married until her death in 1974. Lord Muirshiel died from heart failure at his home in Kilmacolm on 17 August 1992, at the age of 86. He had no children, and the viscountcy died with him. He is buried alongside a number of family members including the Barons Maclay in the Mount Zion Church graveyard in Quarrier's Village near Kilmacolm in his former West Renfrewshire constituency.

== See also ==
- List of Cambridge University Boat Race crews

Party political offices
Preceded by Stanley Holmes	Chairman of the National Liberal Party; 1947–1956	Succeeded by James Duncan
Parliament of the United Kingdom
Preceded by Charles Kerr	Member of Parliament for Montrose Burghs; 1940–1950	Constituency abolished
Preceded by Thomas Scollan	Member of Parliament for West Renfrewshire; 1950–1964	Succeeded by Norman Buchan
Political offices
Preceded by Alfred Barnes	Minister of Transport; 1951–1952	Succeeded by Alan Lennox-Boyd
Preceded by The Lord Ogmore	Minister of Civil Aviation; 1951–1952	Succeeded by Alan Lennox-Boyd
Preceded by The Hon. John Hare	Minister of State for the Colonies; 1956–1957	Succeeded by The Earl of Perth
Preceded by The Hon. James Stuart	Secretary of State for Scotland; 1957–1962	Succeeded by Michael Noble
Honorary titles
Preceded by Sir Walter Shaw-Stewart, Bt	Lord-Lieutenant of Renfrewshire; 1967-1980	Succeeded by David Makgill-Crichton-Maitland
Peerage of the United Kingdom
New creation	Viscount Muirshiel; 1964–1992; Member of the House of Lords (1964–1992)	Extinct
