= Richard Newby, Baron Newby =

British politician and life peer (born 1953)

The Right Honourable The Lord Newby OBE PC
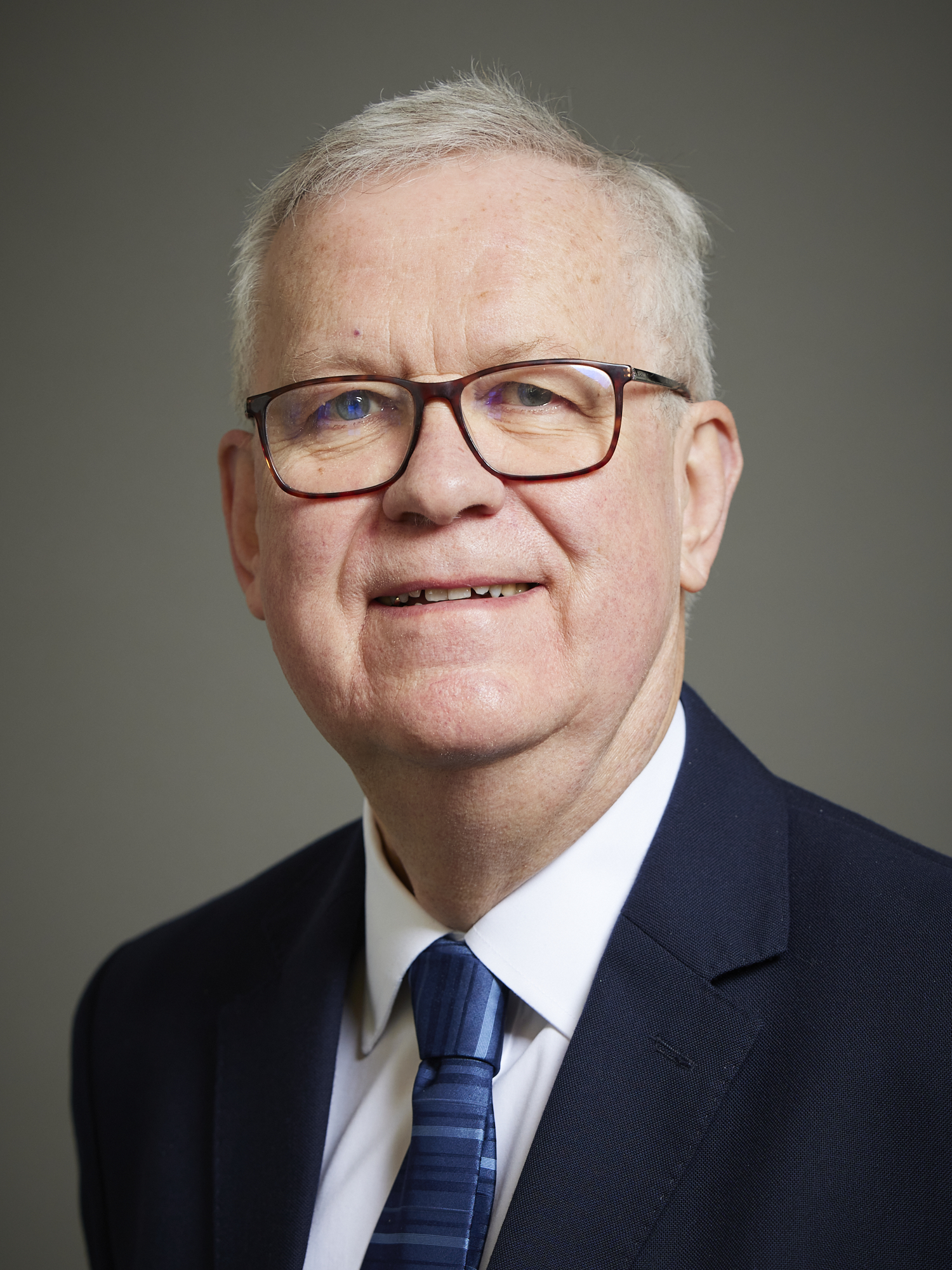
- Official portrait, 2023

Leader of the Liberal Democrats in the House of Lords
- In office 13 September 2016 – 24 July 2025
- Deputy: The Lord Dholakia; The Baroness Walmsley
- Leader: Tim Farron; Sir Vince Cable; Jo Swinson; Davey and Brinton (Acting); Davey and Pack (Acting); Ed Davey
- Preceded by: The Lord Wallace of Tankerness
- Succeeded by: The Lord Purvis of Tweed

Chief Whip of the Liberal Democrats in the House of Lords
- In office 3 May 2012 – 13 September 2016
- Leader: Nick Clegg; Tim Farron
- Preceded by: The Lord Shutt of Greetland
- Succeeded by: The Lord Stoneham of Droxford

Deputy Chief Whip of the House of Lords Captain of the Yeomen of the Guard
- In office 3 May 2012 – 8 May 2015
- Prime Minister: David Cameron
- Preceded by: The Lord Shutt of Greetland
- Succeeded by: The Lord Gardiner of Kimble

Member of the House of Lords
- Lord Temporal
- Life peerage 25 September 1997

Personal details
- Born: 14 February 1953 (age 73)
- Party: Liberal Democrats (since 1988)
- Other political affiliations: Social Democratic (1981–1988)
- Education: St Catherine's College, Oxford

Richard Mark Newby, Baron Newby OBE PC (born 14 February 1953) is a British politician who served as the leader of the Liberal Democrats in the House of Lords between September 2016 and July 2025. He served as Government Deputy Chief Whip in the House of Lords, as Captain of the Yeomen of the Guard between 2012 and 2015, as and Liberal Democrat Chief Whip in the House of Lords from 2012 to 2016.

== Early life, education and career ==
Newby was born in February 1953, the son of Frank and Kathleen Newby. He was educated at the Rothwell Grammar School in the village of Lofthouse in West Yorkshire, followed by St Catherine's College at the University of Oxford, where he received a Bachelor of Arts degree in philosophy, politics and economics in 1974 and was later awarded a Master of Arts degree.

On leaving university, Newby joined HM Customs and Excise where he became principal in charge of budget coordination in 1980. He was then director of corporate affairs at Rosehaugh plc, at one time a major property developer. He subsequently became a consultant on corporate social responsibility.

Newby worked extensively on programmes which used the power of sport to help motivate and educate children and young people. He was chair of sport at The Prince's Trust (1997–2012), chair of International Development Through Sport (a UK Sport charity) and chair of Sport for Life International, of which he remains patron.

== Political career ==
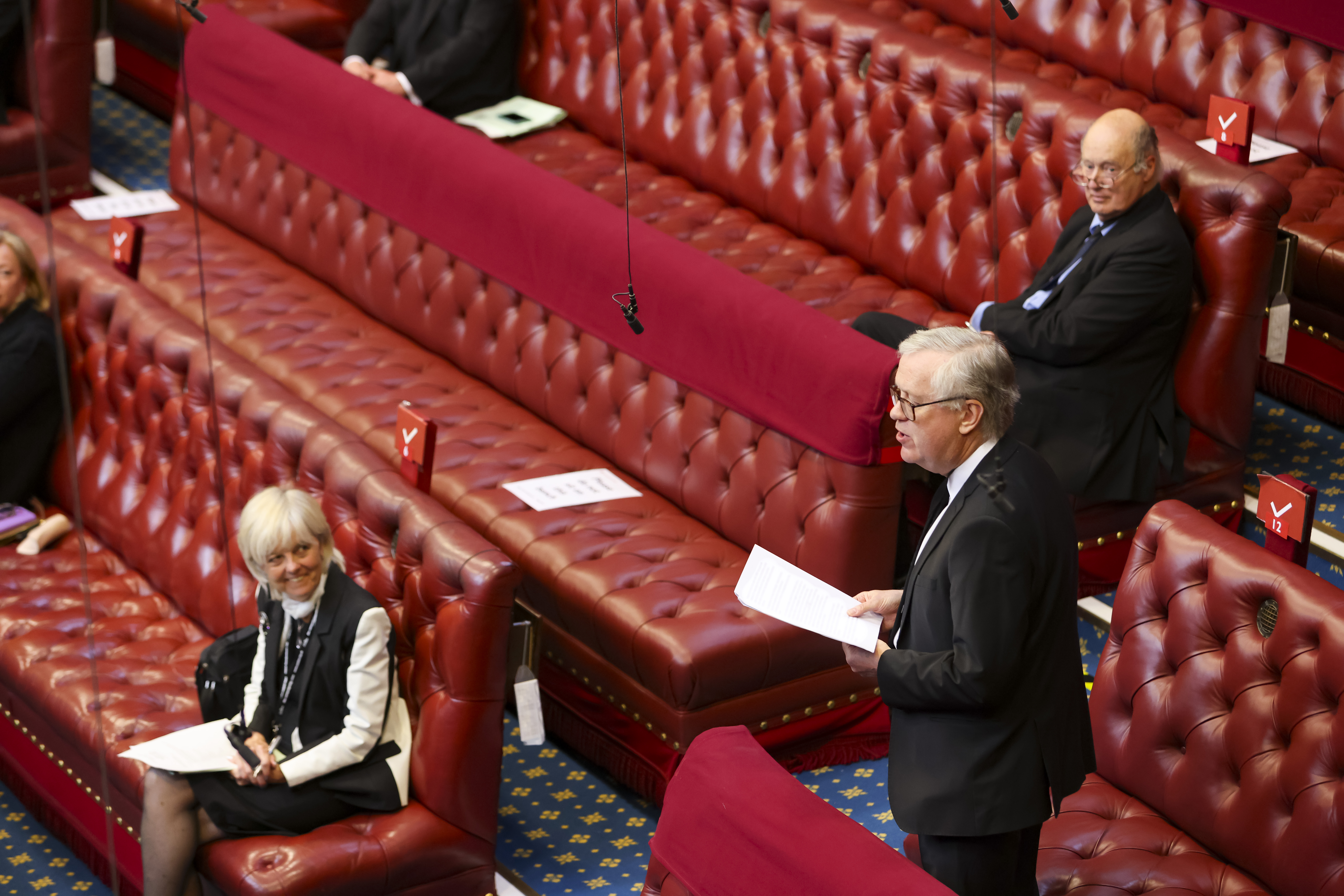
Newby speaks from the backbenches, 2021

Newby was Secretary of the Social Democratic Party (SDP) Parliamentary Committee in 1981, David Owen described him as 'an able young civil servant who resigned to come and work for us', and National Secretary of the SDP from 1983 to 1988. He had parliamentary ambitions, seeking the candidacy for Twickenham, challenging Vince Cable, in 1997. From 1999 to 2006, Newby was Chief of Staff to Charles Kennedy. He was instrumental in the process of managing the succession of leadership from Kennedy to Menzies Campbell.

He was appointed an Officer of the Order of the British Empire (OBE) in the 1990 New Year Honours and was created a life peer with the title Baron Newby, of Rothwell in the County of West Yorkshire on 25 September 1997.

At the beginning of May 2012, Lord Newby was appointed the Liberal Democrat Chief Whip in the House of Lords, and at the same time was appointed the Deputy Government Chief Whip in the House of Lords and Captain of the Yeomen of the Guard.

In September 2012, he was appointed Treasury spokesman in the House of Lords.

In September 2016 he was elected Leader of the Liberal Democrats in the House of Lords, replacing Lord Wallace of Tankerness.

== Personal life ==
Lord Newby has been married since 1978 to Ailsa Ballantyne (née Thomson), a priest and Canon Residentiary of Ripon Cathedral; they have two sons. According to the House of Lords register of members' interests, he jointly owns, with his wife, two flats in Lambeth, London, which are rented out.

Political offices
Preceded by The Lord Shutt of Greetland	Deputy Government Chief Whip in the House of Lords; 2012–2015	Succeeded by The Lord Gardiner of Kimble
Preceded by The Lord Shutt of Greetland	Captain of the Yeomen of the Guard; 2012–2015	Succeeded by The Lord Gardiner of Kimble
Party political offices
Preceded by The Lord Shutt of Greetland	Liberal Democrat Chief Whip of the House of Lords; 2012–2016	Succeeded by The Lord Stoneham of Droxford
Preceded by The Lord Wallace of Tankerness	Leader of the Liberal Democrats in the House of Lords; 2016–2025	Succeeded by The Lord Purvis of Tweed
Orders of precedence in the United Kingdom
Preceded by The Lord Levy	Gentlemen; Baron Newby	Followed by The Lord Lang of Monkton
