= Aldbar Castle =

Aldbar Castle, or Auldbar Castle, was a 16th-century tower house, located 2 miles (3.2 km) southwest of Brechin, in Angus, Scotland.

== History ==
The estate was owned by the Crammond family since the 13th century before it was sold to John Lyon, 8th Lord Glamis (c. 1544 – 1575) in 1575. His son, Sir Thomas Lyon (died 1608), served as Treasurer of Scotland from 1585 to 1595, and built the castle in the late 16th century. The property was subsequently owned by the Sinclair family, and then the Young family.

The Chalmers family owned the estate in the 18th century. The artist Clarkson Stanfield painted the castle in 1801. Patrick Chalmers (1777–1826) enlarged the castle in 1810, and his son Patrick Chalmers (1802–1854) made Baronial-style additions between 1844 and 1854.

A 13th-century grave slab from the castle's chapel is held at the National Museum of Scotland in Edinburgh.
