= Sheffield Telegraph =

British regional newspaper

- Type: Weekly newspaper
- Owner: National World
- Founded: 1855
- Circulation: 1,931 (as of 2023)
- Website: thestar.co.uk

The Sheffield Telegraph is a weekly newspaper published in Sheffield, England. Founded in 1855 as the Sheffield Daily Telegraph, it became known as the Sheffield Telegraph in 1938.

== History ==
The Sheffield Telegraph was founded in 1855 as the Sheffield Daily Telegraph. It was the city's first daily newspaper, published at 08:00 each morning. The newspaper struggled until W. C. Leng became editor in 1864, moving the business to Aldine Court, introducing Linotype printing and using it to support the Conservative Party.

After taking over the Sheffield and Rotherham Independent in 1938, it dropped the "Daily" from its name.

The history of Sheffield's "Telegraph" is intertwined with that of The Star and the Green Un. All three newspapers are published today by Johnston Press PLC. As has been the case for its sister publications, the Telegraph has undergone several name changes during its history.

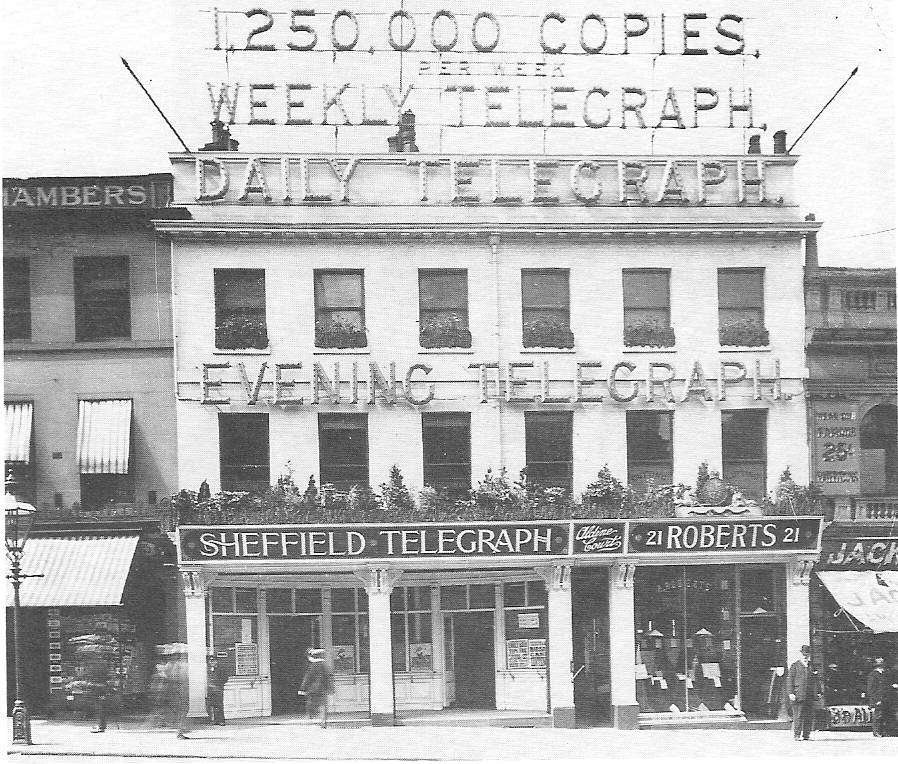
Offices of the Sheffield Daily Telegraph in 1898.

The Sheffield Daily Telegraph was first published on 8 June 1855 and continued under this name until 1934.

In its early years, the newspaper was owned by Frederick Clifford and then William Leng. It aimed to popularise the Conservative Party cause among the working class. By 1898, it was claiming sales of 1,250,000 copies per week, and it had two sister publications: the Weekly Telegraph, which contained feature articles and serialised fiction, and the Evening Telegraph, which later became The Star.

From 16 July 1934 to 29 October 1938 it appeared as the Sheffield Telegraph, and as the Sheffield Telegraph and Daily Independent from 31 October 1938 until 13 May 1939.

During the first years of the war (15 May 1939 – 12 June 1942) the newspaper was named the Telegraph & Independent, changing briefly (13 June 1942 – 14 July 1942) to the Sheffield Telegraph and Independent, before assuming the title Sheffield Telegraph on 15 July 1942 which it maintained until 14 September 1965.

The new title of Sheffield Morning Telegraph was implemented on 15 September 1965 and continued in use to 10 January 1966, after which Morning Telegraph was adopted (11 January 1966 – 8 February 1986). The Morning Telegraph ceased production in 1986.

In 1989, the Sheffield Telegraph was relaunched, and published weekly, on Fridays, and featuring a large property section. In 2010, the Sheffield Telegraph changed its day of publication from a Friday to a Thursday.

In January 2007, the total average issue readership for the Sheffield Telegraph was reported to be 64,093.

Notable staff at the Telegraph have included author Peter Tinniswood; novelists John Harris and J.L. Hodson; cartoonist J. F. Horrabin for the daily and Pete McKee for the weekly; critics George Linstead and E. F. Watling; sports writers John Motson, Lawrence Hunter, Frank Taylor (journalist) (who later survived the Munich Air crash of 1958), sub-editor Israel Panner; news editor Brian Stevenson; lady editor Amy Hurlston; industrial reporter Frazer Wright; George Hopkinson; Jean Rook, who was later a women's writer with the Daily Express; and Will Wyatt.

== Editors ==
1855: Benson
1855: Pearce
1858: William Shepherdson
1864: William C. Leng
1902: R. H. Dunbar
1910: David M. Sutherland
1912: John Oakley
1937: Frederick Keith Gardiner
1955: Bill Lyth
1962: David Hopkinson
1964: Michael J. Finley
1969: Michael Hides
1983: Peter Darling
1989: Alan Powell
2005: David Todd
2016: Nancy Fielder
2021: Ellen Beardmore

== Bibliography ==
- Bob Horton, Living in Sheffield: 1000 years of change
- Keith Farnsworth, The Turner Story: Bringing the News to Sheffield (Henry Melland, London, 1991).
