= Horatio Ross =

British sport shooter

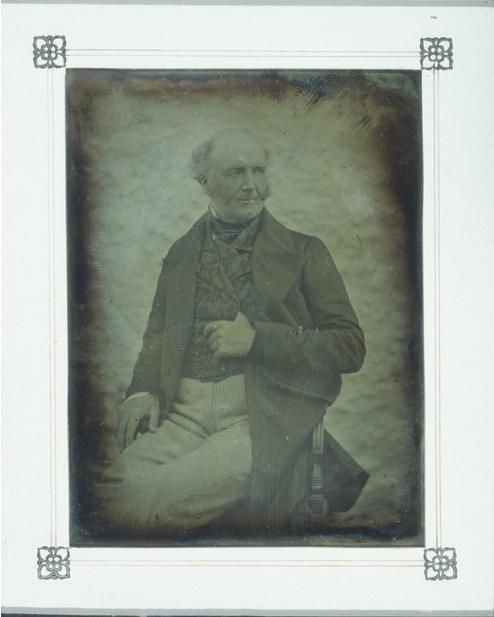
Photographic self-portrait of Horatio Ross. V&A Museum

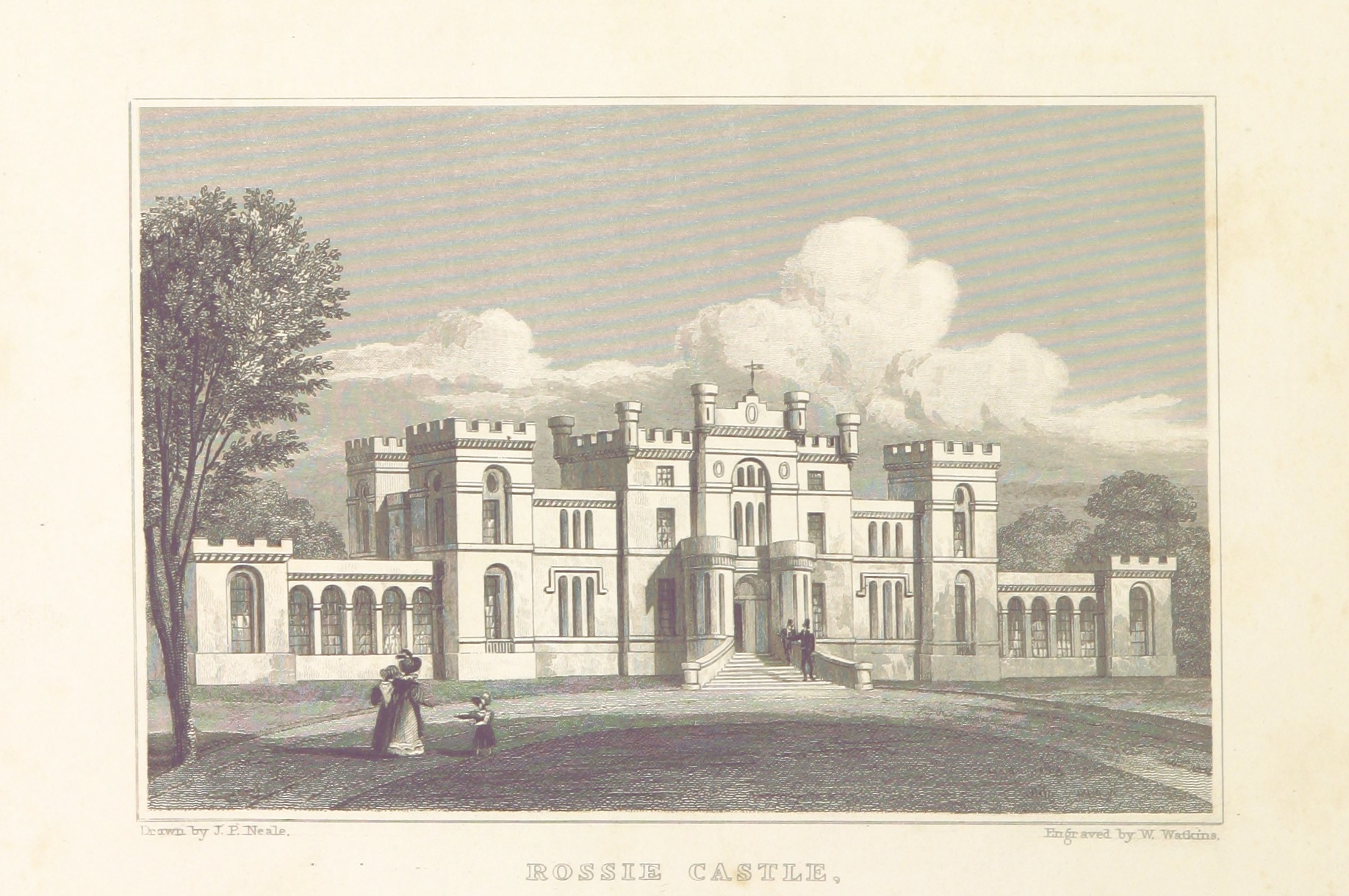
Rossie Castle

Horatio Ross (5 September 1801 – 6 December 1886) was a sportsman and a pioneer amateur photographer.

== Background and early life ==
Ross was born at Rossie Castle, near Montrose, Angus on 5 September 1801, the son of Hercules Ross, a rich landowner, and his wife, Henrietta Parrish. His father had acquired a substantial fortune as a slave trader in St Andrew's parish, Jamaica. Horatio was named after his godfather, Horatio Nelson, his father's intimate friend.

In 1817, following his father's death, he inherited the large Rossie Castle estate.

As a young man, he embarked on a brief military career, with a commission in the 14th Light Dragoons, and an equally brief political career as MP (first for Aberdeen Burghs and then for Montrose Burghs) between 1831 and 1835. However, he was reluctant to engage too deeply in any activity that might distract him from his primary and abiding passion for field sports.

== Sporting activities ==
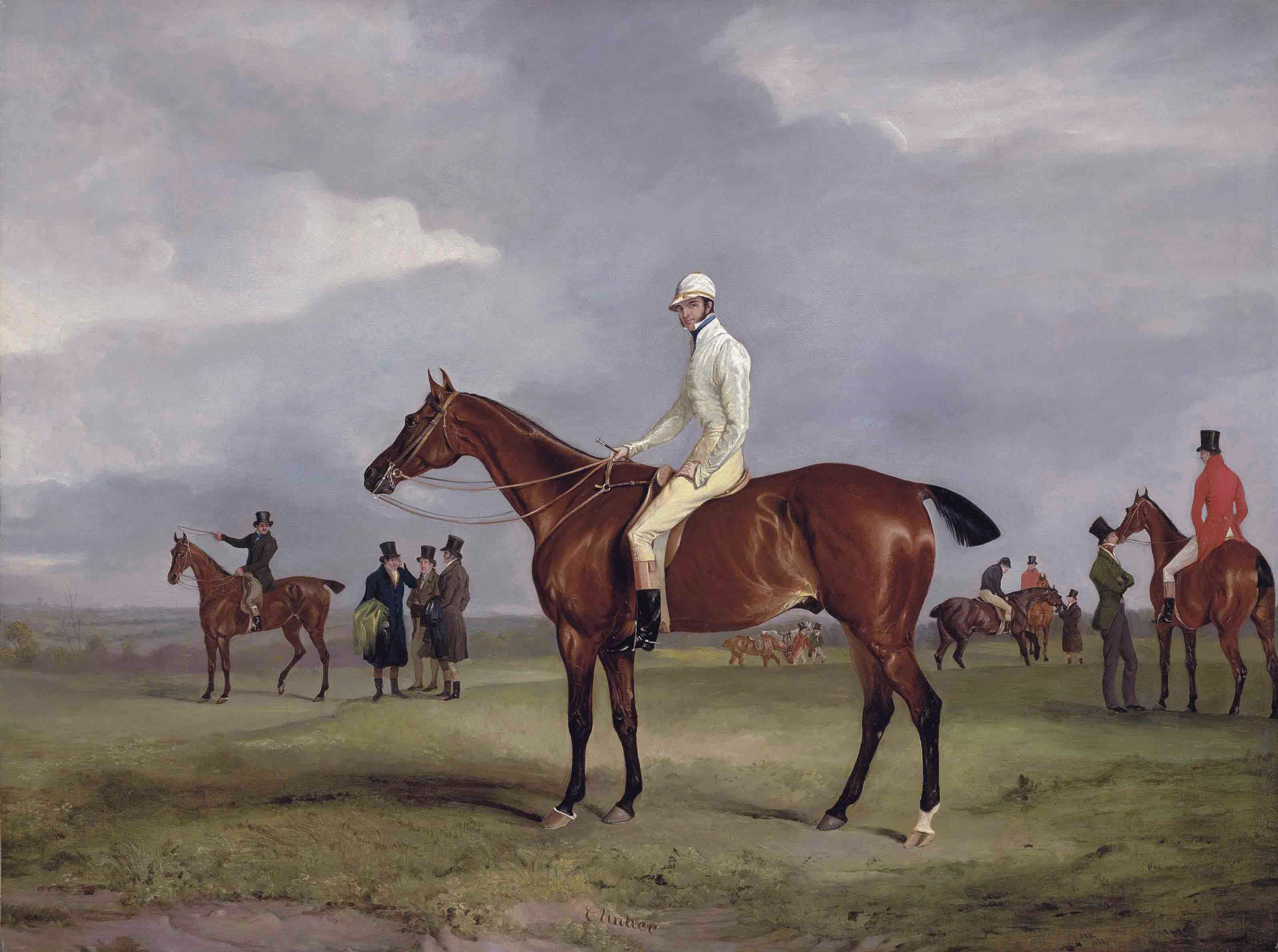
Clinker with Captain Horatio Ross up, after winning the 1826 race against Captain Douglas, who is pictured to the right with his head bent. (John Ferneley)

His sporting activities were numerous and were recorded in Sportascrapiana (1867), a collection of anecdotes edited by C.A.Wheeler. He was a fine cricketer, a sculling champion and a prize-winning yachtsman. In 1826, on Clinker, he won a famous steeplechase against Captain Douglas, on Radical, a horse owned by Lord Kennedy. He was also a remarkable pedestrian. On one occasion, Lord Kennedy had engaged in a walking match with Sir Andrew Leith Hay for £2,500. Ross was asked to act as umpire. Despite having just finished a full day's shooting, he set off at 9.00pm to walk nearly 100 miles from Banchory, Kincardineshire, to Inverness. He walked through the night, the following day and the next night, arriving at Inverness at 6.00am. His boots having disintegrated, he completed the last 25 miles or so barefoot.

== Shooting ==
However, Ross's greatest feats were as a marksman. He took part in many matches with the leading shots of the day, such as General Anson, and was much assisted by his extraordinary fitness and stamina, which lasted into his old age. On his 82nd birthday, he killed 82 grouse with 82 shots. On one occasion he challenged the Honourable George Vernon to a shooting match at 100 yards, which he won, despite using a pistol while Vernon used a rifle. On the same day, he won £100 from Henry Baring by hitting a hat with his pistol at one hundred yards' distance.

He and his sons regularly carried all before them at the most prestigious NRA annual rifle competitions at Wimbledon, London. Perhaps his most remarkable feat with the rifle was performed in 1867. In that year he won the cup of the Cambridge Long Range Rifle Club against nearly all the best shots of the three kingdoms. The competition extended up to eleven hundred yards, a test of nerve, judgment, and, most of all, of eyesight, which it would seem wholly impossible for any man in his sixty-sixth year to stand successfully.

In 1899, The English Illustrated Magazine described him as "undoubtedly the deer stalker of the expiring century."

In the society amid which Captain Ross spent his youth challenges and duels were no uncommon occurrence. He himself never appears to have been in any danger of figuring as principal. But he acted as second no fewer than sixteen times, and was justly proud of the fact that on every single occasion he had prevented a shot being fired. This was stated by him in his latter days in a published letter in which he emphatically condemned the system of duelling.

== Photography ==
In the mid-1840s Ross took up early photography. He was a Daguerrotypist from 1847 and a Calotypist from 1849. In 1856 he was a founding member of the Photographic Society of Scotland, of which he later became the President. He took numerous photographs, in particular, of Highland scenery, stalking and fishing. His work is now much sought after by collectors.

- To view the Janet Lehr Inc. NY Collection of Horatio Ross negatives c.1858
- A small selection of Horatio Ross photographs and negative can be seen here

Museum exhibitions incorporating the works of Horatio Ross

- 1992 La Menagerie du Palais. Centre national de la photographie, Palais de Tokyo Paris, France. 8 June – 16 September included Horatio Ross stag pictures from the Collection of Janet Lehr Inc. NY
- 1993 Horatio Ross - 1850s Scottish Photographer. Yale University, British Center for the Arts. 11 September – 26 November. Works from Justine Ross Presentation Album of 110 photographs included 54 albumen prints from waxed paper negatives c.1858. Collection of Janet Lehr Inc. NY
- 1994 MAGNUM OPUS. 5 February – 14 April. Art Gallery of New South Wales, Sydney Australia. The 112 works comprising an entire History of Photography. Collection loaned by Janet Lehr Inc. NY included albumen prints from waxed paper negatives c.1958 by Horatio Ross.

== Family ==
On 26 December 1833 Ross married Justine Henrietta Macrae, the daughter of Colin Macrae of Inverinate. They had five sons, who inherited a fair share of their father's sporting prowess. Ross's way of life, though in many ways enviable and not conventionally extravagant, was not profitable and, as time went on, he found himself obliged to retrench.

He ended his days in the Scottish Highlands to which he had devoted so much of his life. He died at Rossie Lodge in Inverness on 6 December 1886.

Parliament of the United Kingdom
Preceded by Sir James Carnegie, Bt	Member of Parliament for Aberdeen Burghs; 1831–1832	Constituency abolished
New constituency	Member of Parliament for Montrose Burghs; 1832–1835	Succeeded by Patrick Chalmers
