= John Shiress Will =

British legal writer and politician

John Shiress Will

John Shiress Will QC, born John Will (1840 – 24 May 1910) was a British legal writer and politician. He was born in Dundee, the son of John Will, a merchant, and his wife Mary Chambers. He was educated at Brechin Grammar School and afterwards at the University of Edinburgh and at King's College London, although he graduated from neither. In 1861, he was admitted to the Middle Temple, being called to the bar in 1864. In 1868 he was appointed an Ensign in the 19th Surrey Rifle Volunteer Corps. In 1883 he was made Queen's Counsel, and was made a Bencher of the Middle Temple in 1888.

In 1885, he was elected as a member of parliament (MP) for Montrose Burghs, a position he was re-elected to in 1886, 1892, and 1895. He was a strong supporter of William Ewart Gladstone, and resigned his seat on 5 February 1896 by taking the post of Steward of the Manor of Northstead so that John Morley could be re-elected after a defeat in Newcastle-upon-Tyne.

He was appointed a County Court Judge in 1906.

== Sources ==
- Oxford DNB: Will, John Shiress

Parliament of the United Kingdom
Preceded by William Edward Baxter	Member of Parliament for Montrose Burghs; 1885 – 1896	Succeeded by John Morley
