= George Linstead =

British musician (1908–1974)

George Frederick Linstead (24 January 1908 – 28 December 1974) was a musician, critic and composer, who featured prominently in the musical life of Sheffield and South Yorkshire.

Linstead spent his childhood in the village of Doveridge, South Derbyshire, where his musical talents first developed. The sudden death of his father in 1915 forced the family to move to Sheffield, where he spent the rest of his life, never forgetting his country roots. After leaving Sheffield Central School in 1923, he devoted himself to a musical career. While financial circumstances prevented his university matriculation, he nevertheless obtained degrees through external study, including those of Bachelor and Doctor of Music.

For many years, from his appointment in 1940, Linstead was the music critic of the Sheffield Telegraph. He was a music lecturer at Sheffield University, an organist and choirmaster (latterly at Christ Church, Fulwood, Sheffield), and for many years contributed program notes for the Philharmonic concerts. His numerous compositions included works for orchestra, solo instrument, piano, organ and choir. Some of these were performed by the Halle Orchestra and received their first public hearing in the City Hall. Several of these compositions have a local connection, including his Symphonic Study “Doveridge”, his arrangement of the Castleton Garland Dance, and his film music for “Engineers in Steel”, commissioned for the British Steel Corporation. The Horn Sonata, a copy of which was found in Dennis Brain's library, has been recorded.
