= David Shutt, Baron Shutt of Greetland =

British politician (1942–2020)

The Right Honourable The Lord Shutt of Greetland OBE PC
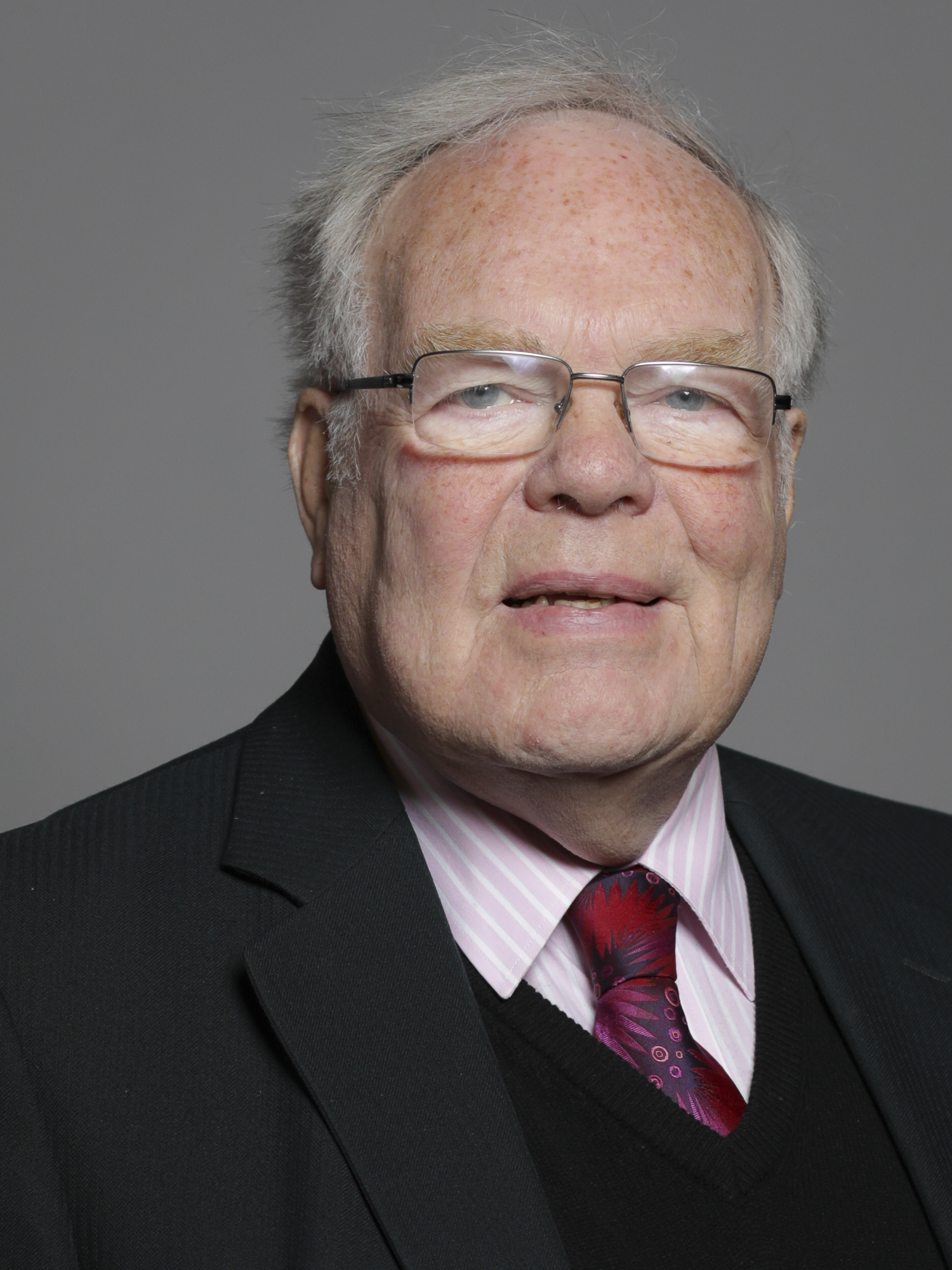
- Official portrait, 2020

Deputy Chief Whip of the House of Lords Captain of the Yeomen of the Guard
- In office 14 May 2010 – 1 May 2012
- Prime Minister: David Cameron
- Preceded by: The Lord Davies of Oldham
- Succeeded by: The Lord Newby

Chief Whip of the Liberal Democrats in the House of Lords
- In office 5 May 2005 – 3 May 2012
- Leader: Nick Clegg; Sir Menzies Campbell; Charles Kennedy
- Preceded by: The Lord Roper
- Succeeded by: The Lord Newby

Member of the House of Lords
- Lord Temporal
- Life peerage 12 May 2000 – 30 October 2020

Personal details
- Born: David Trevor Shutt; 16 March 1942 Leeds, West Riding of Yorkshire, England
- Died: 30 October 2020 (aged 78)
- Party: Liberal (before 1988); Liberal Democrats (after 1988)
- Spouse: Margaret Pemberton (m. 1965)
- Children: 3

David Trevor Shutt, Baron Shutt of Greetland, OBE, PC (16 March 1942 – 30 October 2020) was a British Liberal Democrat politician who served as Captain of the Yeomen of the Guard and Deputy Chief Whip in the House of Lords between May 2010 and May 2012.

== Early life ==
Shutt was born at Farsley, Leeds and attended Pudsey Grammar School in Yorkshire.

== Career ==
After school Shutt trained as an accountant. In 1975 he became a director of the Joseph Rowntree Reform Trust, of which he later became chairman. He also became a Trustee of the Joseph Rowntree Charitable Trust. In 1973 he was elected to Calderdale Metropolitan Borough Council, now Calderdale Council, as a Liberal councillor, and later represented the Liberal Democrats on this council, serving as Mayor of Calderdale in 1982–83.

He stood unsuccessfully for Parliament at seven general elections between 1970 and 1992. He contested Sowerby in 1970, February 1974, October 1974, and 1979. After the abolition of the Sowerby seat, he contested the new Calder Valley constituency in 1983 and 1987. At the 1992 general election he was the Liberal Democrat candidate in Pudsey.

He was appointed an Officer of the Order of the British Empire (OBE) in the 1993 New Year Honours, and on 12 May 2000 was created a life peer as Baron Shutt of Greetland, of Greetland and Stainland in the County of West Yorkshire. He was Liberal Democrat International Development spokesperson in the House of Lords until 2002. Following the 2005 general election, he was appointed the Liberal Democrat Chief Whip in the House of Lords. After the formation of the coalition government headed by David Cameron in May 2010, Shutt was appointed Captain of the Yeomen of the Guard and Government Deputy Chief Whip in the House of Lords, positions he held until May 2012, when he stepped down as the Liberal Democrats' Lords Chief Whip.

== Personal life ==
In 1965, he married Margaret Pemberton, with whom he had two sons and a daughter.

Lord Shutt died on 30 October 2020, at the age of 78.

Political offices
Preceded by The Lord Davies of Oldham	Captain of the Yeomen of the Guard; 2010–2012	Succeeded by The Lord Newby
