= Charles Kerr, 1st Baron Teviot =

British soldier and politician

The Right Honourable The Lord Teviot DSO, MC

Member of Parliament for Montrose Burghs
- In office 28 June 1932 – 27 June 1940
- Preceded by: Robert Hutchison
- Succeeded by: John Maclay

Personal details
- Born: 3 May 1874 London, England, United Kingdom
- Died: 7 January 1968 (aged 93) London, England, United Kingdom
- Spouses: Muriel Constance Canning (m. 1911; div. 1930) Florence Villiers (m. 1930)
- Children: Charles Kerr, 2nd Baron Teviot

Charles Iain Kerr, 1st Baron Teviot, DSO, MC (3 May 1874 – 7 January 1968), was a British politician.

Kerr was the son of Charles Wyndham Rodolph Kerr and the great-grandson of William Kerr, 6th Marquess of Lothian. His mother was Anna Maria Olivia, daughter of Admiral Sir George Elliot. He achieved the rank of Lieutenant-Colonel in the Royal Horse Guards and was awarded the Distinguished Service Order and the Military Cross. Kerr entered the House of Commons at the Montrose Burghs by-election in 1932 as a member of the National Liberal Party. He was Chief Whip of the National Liberals and served as a Junior Lord of the Treasury (government whip) from 1937 to 1939 and as Comptroller of the Household from 1939 to 1940 in the National Government. On 27 June 1940 he was raised to the peerage as Baron Teviot, of Burghclere in the County of Southampton. He then served as Chairman of the Liberal National Party (known from 1948 as the National Liberal Party) from 1940 to 1956. He was also a member of the pro-Nazi Right Club.

Lord Teviot married, firstly, Muriel Constance, daughter of William Gordon Canning, in 1911. They had no children and were divorced in 1930. He married, secondly, Florence Angela, daughter of Charles Walter Villiers, in 1930. In 1960 he unsuccessfully moved to ban publication of Lady Chatterley's Lover and all books akin. Teviot died in January 1968, aged 93, and was succeeded in the barony by his only son from his second marriage, Charles. Lady Teviot died in 1979.

== Arms ==
Coat of arms of Charles Kerr, 1st Baron Teviot
Crest A stag's head erased Proper. Escutcheon Quarterly 1st & 4th Gules on a chevron Argent three mullets of the field (Kerr of Ferniehurst) 2nd & 3rd per fess Gules and Vert on a chevron Argent between three mascles in chief Or and a unicorn's head in base of the third horned of the fourth three mullets of the first (Kerr of Cessford) in the centre of the quarters a rose Or. Supporters Two border terriers Proper. Motto Sero Sed Serio (Late But in Earnest)

== Citations ==
Parliament of the United Kingdom
Preceded by Robert Hutchison	Member of Parliament for Montrose Burghs; 1932–1940	Succeeded by John Maclay
Political offices
Preceded by Charles Waterhouse	Comptroller of the Household; 1939–1940	Succeeded by William Whiteley
Peerage of the United Kingdom
New title	Baron Teviot; 1940–1968	Succeeded by Charles John Kerr
