= Israel Panner =

Israel Panner (1909 - May 1973), also known by the pen names Ike Rennap and Harry Robertson, was an Austrian/British writer and journalist.

Active in Jewish and Communist circles, in 1934 Panner became secretary the Jewish Colonization Association in the USSR, and in 1935 was elected Secretary of the Jewish Labour Council. After serving in the army in World War II, in 1947 he became editor of the Jewish Clarion and in 1948, the London correspondent (as Robertson) of Kol HaAm. He went on to work as a sub-editor for the Sheffield Telegraph and the Birmingham Post, before serving as chief parliamentary editor of The Daily Telegraph and author (as Ike Rennap) of Middle Eastern literature. Under this pseudonym, he wrote Antisemitism and the Jewish Question (1942). At this time, he falsely claimed Joseph Stalin had protected Jews against antisemitism.

As a Communist Jewish writer of the period, Panner was a subject of Security Service interest in the 1930s and 1940s. As documented in KV 2/2173 (1934–1947) he first came to the Service's attention through being mentioned in intercepted correspondence of other Communist targets, and was soon found speaking at meetings.

His Intelligence file (File refs KV 2/2173-2174) includes a Special Branch report of his arrest for obstruction in February 1941 while he was engaged in trying to propagate Communist ideals in the confined spaces of the communal air-raid shelters in London's East End. Initially working as a stretcher-bearer for a London council, he was eventually called up in July 1942, and the file contains a number of the Special Observation Report Forms compiled on him by his senior officers. Typical of these is the one at serial 68a which describes him as being a "barrack room lawyer and given to grousing. Argumentative towards his fellow soldiers." Taken together these reports give a very full account of his (largely uneventful) military career. After demobilisation in June 1946, Panner returned to his journalistic work, and the Service continued to monitor his activities (as shown in KV 2/2174) until 1953.
