= W. C. Leng =

Sir William C. Leng
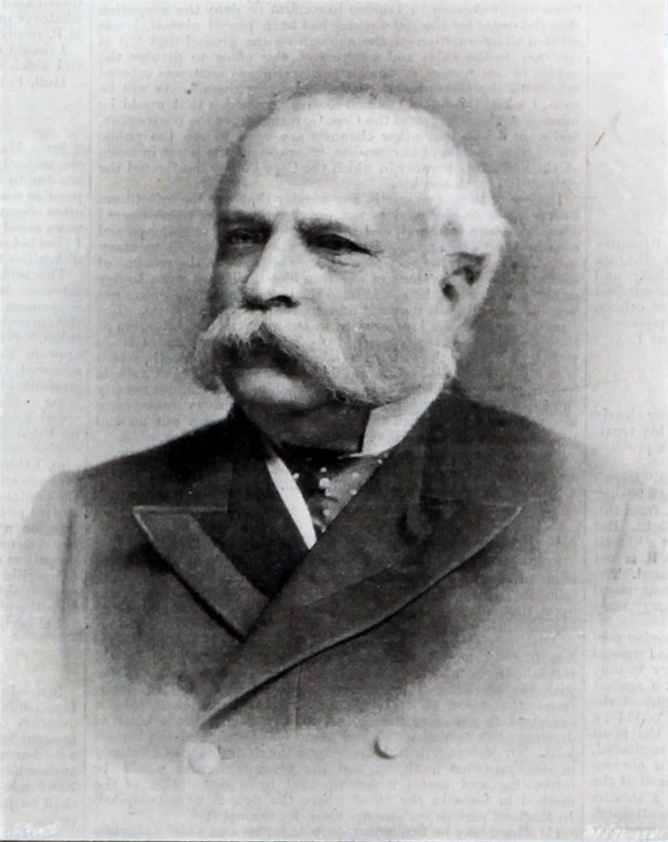
- Born: 25 January 1825; Hull
- Died: 20 February 1902 (aged 77); Sheffield
- Occupation: Newspaper publisher
- Known for: Sheffield Telegraph

Sir William Christopher Leng, known as W. C. Leng (25 January 1825 – 20 February 1902) was a newspaper publisher in Sheffield.

== Life ==
Leng was born in Hull on 25 January 1825. He was oldest son of Adam Leng of Hull, and Mary, daughter of Christopher Luccock, of Malton, architect. Sir John Leng was a younger brother.

He was educated in Hull, before being apprenticed as a pharmacist and setting up his own business. During this period, he contributed anonymously to the Hull Free Press, calling for reforms such as slum clearance and ship safety. He is believed to have inspired Samuel Plimsoll to take up this second cause.

Leng's family was Methodist and aligned with the Liberal Party cause. His brother John Leng retained these beliefs, but William joined the Church of England and became a supporter of the Conservative Party. Despite this, after John became the proprietor of the Dundee Advertiser, William was a regular contributor, and in 1859, he moved to the city. He was a prominent supporter of the north in the American Civil War, when most Scottish journalists supported the South.

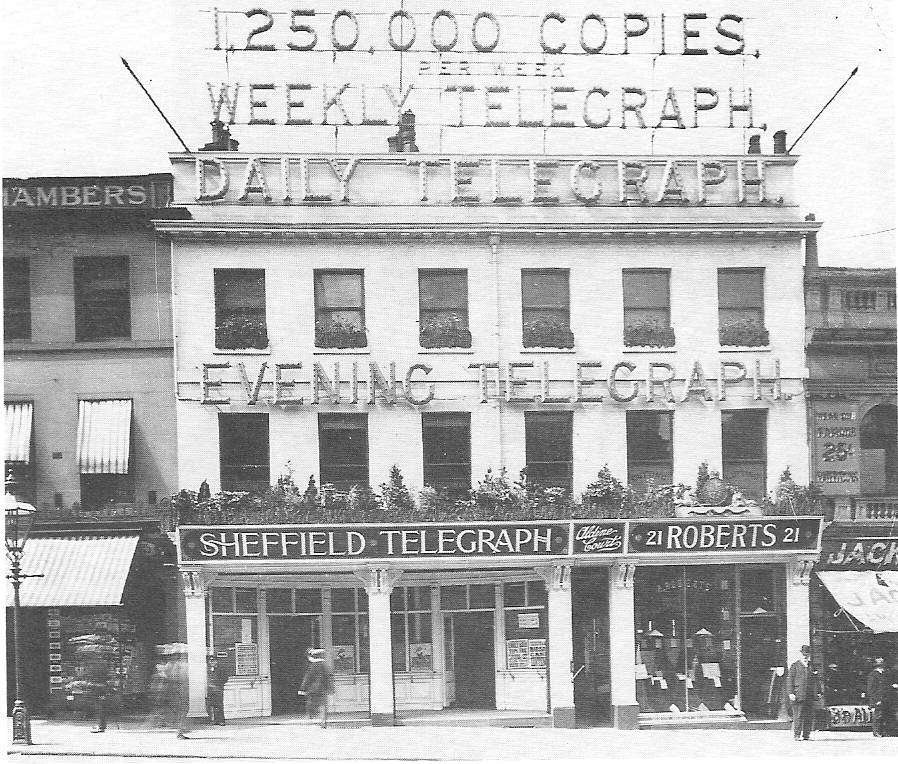
Offices of the Sheffield Telegraph in 1898.

In 1864, Leng became managing editor and joint proprietor of the Sheffield Daily Telegraph with Frederick Clifford. He moved to the city and relocated the firm to new premises on Aldine Court. Under him, the newspaper became one of the first to adopt linotype printing.

Shortly after Leng arrived in Sheffield, the city was struck by the Great Sheffield Flood. Following this disaster, he campaigned for the municipalisation of the city's water supply. His reputation established by this activity, he was able to publicise and investigate the Sheffield Outrages in 1867.

Leng was charged with libel in 1870 and stood trial as the proprietor and editor in a case which has become known as 'The Sefton Libel Case'. The admitted libel against the Earl and Countess of Sefton was libelled within an edition of the Telegraph due to the actions of an unnamed sub-editor following Leng's absence due to illness. The judge fined him £50 and explained, "We are satisfied that the justice of the case will be met by the infliction upon you of a fine, and a fine extremely moderate in its amount, because we cannot shut our eyes to those circumstances which have been urged in mitigating."

Leng never took political office, but became the leading figure in Sheffield Conservatism. During the last quarter of the nineteenth century, the Conservatives became the dominant group on Sheffield Town Council, while the Daily Telegraph was supplemented by the Weekly Telegraph, the Sunday Telegraph and the Evening Telegraph and Star.

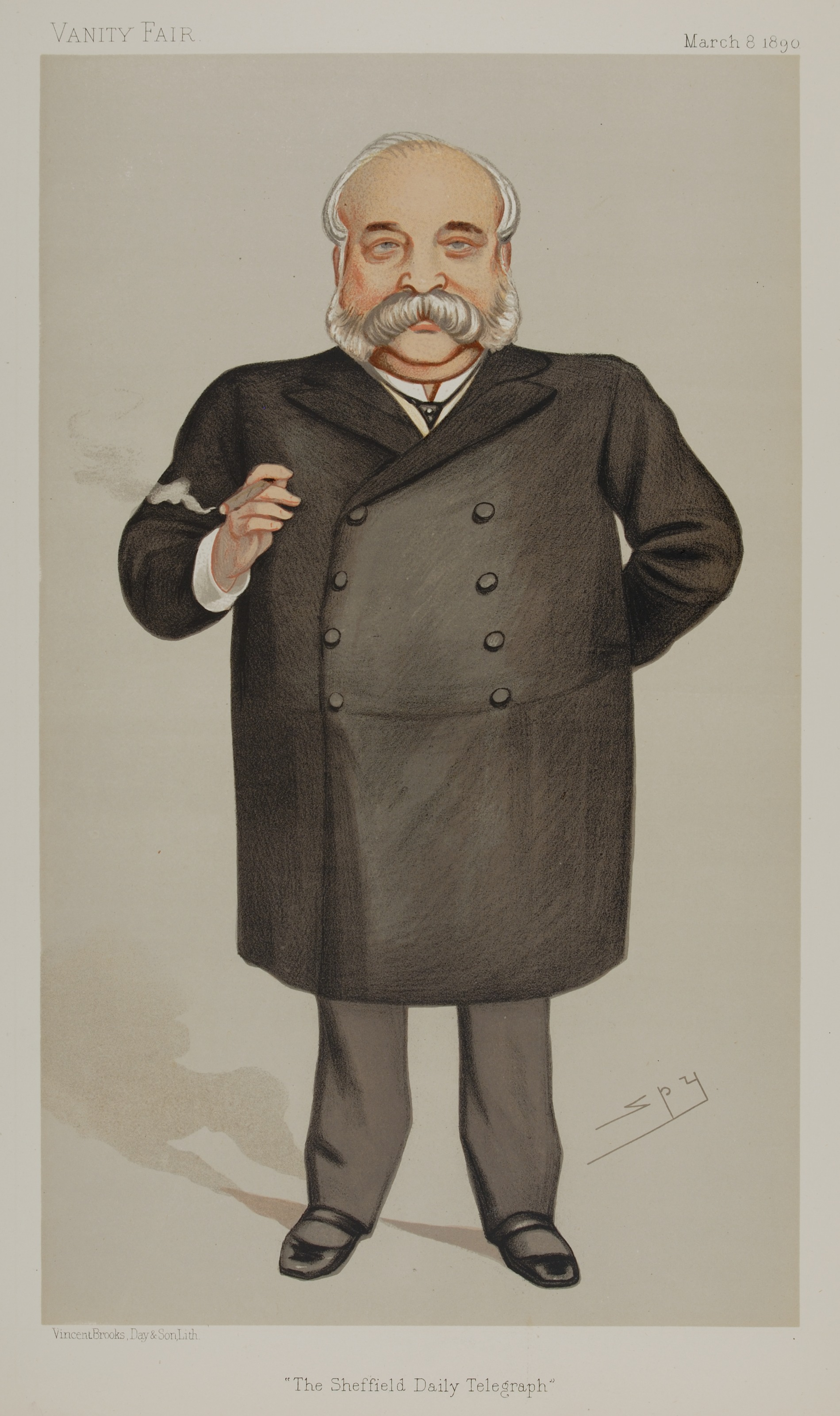
Leng as caricatured by Spy (Leslie Ward) in Vanity Fair, March 1890

Politically, he was a supporter of imperial preference and established Conservative Clubs and electoral organisations on a constituency basis throughout Sheffield. He was the Vice-Chairman and later the Chairman of the Sheffield Conservative and Constitutional Association, the Vice President of the Sheffield Association for Promoting Sanitary Reform and the Better Housing of the Poor, and the President of the Sheffield Chamber of Commerce in 1895–96. He generally supported municipalisation, while Liberals in the city opposed, until the positions were reversed over the question of the tramways in 1895.

Leng was knighted in 1887, on the recommendation of Lord Salisbury. He continued writing for the Telegraph until his last days.

He died at Sheffield, on 20 February 1902. He was buried in Ecclesall churchyard.

== Family ==
He married in 1860, Anne (died 1893), daughter of David Stark of Ruthven, Forfarshire, and widow of Harry Cook of Sandhurst, Australia. His two sons, C. D. Leng and W. St. Quentin Leng, were partners in the Sheffield Telegraph.

== Artistic recognition ==
A portrait by Hugh Ford Crighton was commissioned by public subscription in 1868.

== Notes ==
Attribution

This article incorporates text from a publication now in the public domain: Millar, Alexander Hastie (1912). "Leng, William Christopher". In Lee, Sidney (ed.). Dictionary of National Biography (2nd supplement). London: Smith, Elder & Co.
