= John Carnegie (Labour politician) =

Scottish politician

John Carnegie (1860 – 4 February 1928) was a Scottish politician.

Born in Brechin, Carnegie began working at the age of ten. He became interested in socialism, joining the Socialist League, and was an early member of the Scottish Labour Party, then became a founding member of the Independent Labour Party (ILP). Under this label, he was elected to the Dundee Public Board in 1894, becoming its first socialist member, and in 1904 he was elected to Dundee Town Council.

By the 1920s, Carnegie was living in Barry near Carnoustie, and working as a building contractor. He served on the Forfarshire Education Authority Works Committee. He stood for the Labour Party in Montrose Burghs at the 1922 and 1923 United Kingdom general elections, taking a close second place on each occasion.
