= 1908 Montrose Burghs by-election =

UK Parliamentary by-election

- 12 May 1908

| Candidate | Harcourt | Burgess | Constable |
| Party | Liberal | Ind. Labour Party | Conservative |
| Popular vote | 3,083 | 1,937 | 1,576 |
| Percentage | 46.7% | 29.4% | 23.9% |
MP before election
John Morley
Liberal
Subsequent MP
Robert Harcourt
Liberal

The 1908 Montrose Burghs by-election was held on 12 May 1908. The by-election was held due to the elevation to the peerage of the incumbent Liberal MP, John Morley. It was won by the Liberal candidate Robert Harcourt.

Montrose Burghs by-election, 1908
| Party | Candidate | Votes | % | ±% |
|---|---|---|---|---|
| Liberal | Robert Harcourt | 3,083 | 46.7 | −23.0 |
| Ind. Labour Party | Joseph Burgess | 1,937 | 29.4 | New |
| Conservative | Andrew Constable | 1,576 | 23.9 | −6.4 |
| Majority | | 1,146 | 17.3 | −22.1 |
| Turnout | | 6,596 | 80.4 | +4.7 |
| Liberal hold | | Swing | -8.3 | |
