= Robert Harcourt (Liberal politician) =

British diplomat, playwright, farmer and politician

Robert Venables Vernon Harcourt (7 May 1878 – 8 September 1962) was a British diplomat, playwright, farmer and Liberal Party politician.

== Family and education ==
Harcourt was the son of a Liberal statesman, Sir William Harcourt, who was briefly leader of the Liberal Party from 1896 to 1898 and his second wife Elizabeth Cabot Motley who was the daughter of John Lothrop Motley sometime Minister of the United States in London and author of a number of works of history. His brother, Lewis Vernon Harcourt, was also a Liberal MP and government minister.

Harcourt was educated at Eton College and Trinity College, Cambridge, where he took honours in the History Tripos. At Cambridge, he was a committee member of Cambridge University Liberal Club from 1899 to 1900.

He was engaged to be married to Margery (or Marjorie) Cunard, the granddaughter and heiress of the founder of the famous Cunard shipping concern, but the engagement was twice broken off. However, Miss Cunard was eventually persuaded to relent, and she married Harcourt in 1911. They had one daughter, Mary Elizabeth.

== Career ==
Harcourt went into the Foreign Service, serving as a Clerk on the diplomatic establishment of the Foreign Office from 1900 to 1906. He was then briefly engaged in journalism, being parliamentary correspondent of the magazine Tribune until he was elected to the House of Commons at a by-election in 1908. After leaving the Commons, Harcourt went into farming at his country home near Lyndhurst in Hampshire where he eventually built up a pedigree Jersey herd of about 50 head of cattle.

== War Service ==
During the First World War, Harcourt served as a lieutenant in the Royal Naval Volunteer Reserve from 1914 to 1918. He later served as a pilot officer in the Royal Air Force Volunteer Reserve from February 1939 until August that year, after which he was promoted to flight lieutenant.

== Politics ==
Harcourt followed the Liberal family tradition. He stood unsuccessfully for the London County Council seat of Mile End in 1907, as a Progressive. The Municipal Reform Party swept that election however and Harcourt turned his sights towards Parliament. He first stood for Parliament without success at the Hastings by-election of 1908. However another chance soon arrived with the elevation to the peerage of John Morley. Morley had been Secretary of State for India since 1905 but he was given a seat in the House of Lords to ease the burden of performing this office, so creating a vacancy in his Montrose Burghs constituency. The by-election was held on 12 May 1908. In a three-cornered contest, Harcourt held the seat for the Liberals with a majority of 1,146 over Labour, with the Unionists in third place.

Harcourt held his seat at Montrose at the general elections of January and December 1910. He did not contest the seat at the 1918 general election and the seat was taken for the Coalition Liberals by John Leng Sturrock in a straight fight against Labour.

Harcourt was sometime Chairman of the Reform Union.

== Dramatist ==
Harcourt was also a playwright. He published two three-act comedies; An Angel Unawares, which was produced by Miss Fanny Brough at Terry's Theatre in 1906, and A Question of Age, produced by Harley Granville-Barker which played at the Court Theatre in 1907. In addition while an MP he successfully agitated for the appointment of a Parliamentary inquiry into the Censorship of Plays and was a member of the Joint Committee set up to examine the issue.

== Death ==
Harcourt died at the age of 84 years on 8 September 1962. He is buried at All Saints, Minstead near, Lyndhurst.

Parliament of the United Kingdom
Preceded by John Morley	Member of Parliament for Montrose Burghs; 1908 – 1918	Succeeded by John Sturrock
