= John Sturrock (writer) =

English writer, editor, reviewer and translator (1930–2017)

- Born: John Anning Leng Sturrock; 14 June 1930
- Died: 15 August 2017 (aged 87)
- Occupations: Writer, editor, reviewer and translator
- Notable credit(s): The Times Literary Supplement; London Review of Books
- Father: John Leng Sturrock

John Anning Leng Sturrock (14 June 1930 – 15 August 2017) was an English writer, editor, reviewer and translator who was closely associated with The Times Literary Supplement and later the London Review of Books.

He was the son of the politician John Leng Sturrock.

== Selected publications ==
=== Author ===
- French New Novel: Claude Simon, Michel Butor, Alain Robbe-Grillet. Oxford: Oxford University Press, 1969. ISBN 9780192121783
- Paper Tigers: Ideal Fictions of Jorge Luis Borges. Oxford: Oxford University Press, 1977. ISBN 0198157460
- The French Pyrenees. London: Faber, 1988. ISBN 0571137415
- The Language of Autobiography: Studies in the first person singular. Cambridge: Cambridge University Press, 1993. ISBN 0521412900
- The Word from Paris: Essays on modern French writers and thinkers. London: Verso, 1998. ISBN 185984832X
- Structuralism. Oxford: Blackwell, 2002.

=== Editor ===
- Structuralism and Since: From Lévi Strauss to Derrida. Oxford: Oxford University Press, 1979. ISBN 0192158392
- The Oxford Guide to Contemporary Writing. Oxford: Oxford University Press, 1996. ISBN 0198182627
- The Oxford Guide to Contemporary World Literature. Oxford: Oxford University Press, 1996. ISBN 0192833189

=== Translations ===
- De Gaulle, Israel and the Jews, Praeger, 1969; Transaction Publishers, 2004; Routledge, 2017. In French: De Gaulle, Israël et les Juifs, Paris: Plon, 1968.
- The Charterhouse of Parma (1836), by Stendhal, Penguin, 2006.
