= Balfour Hutchison =

British Army officer

Lieutenant-General Sir Balfour Hutchison KBE CB
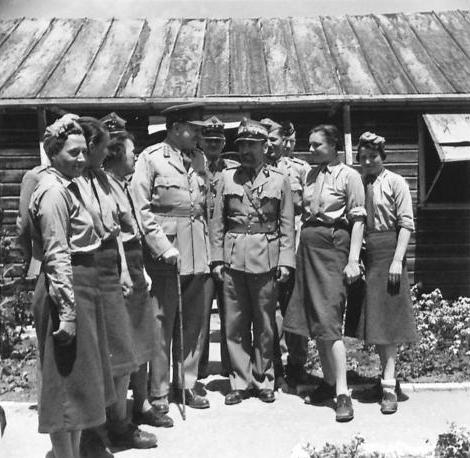
- Major-General Hutchison (centre left) with General Zamorski and members of the Polish Women's Auxiliary Service in 1942
- Born: 12 February 1889; Kirkcaldy, Fife, Scotland
- Died: 26 April 1967 (aged 78); Rendham, Suffolk, England
- Military career
- Allegiance: United Kingdom
- Branch: British Army
- Service years: 1909–1945
- Rank: Lieutenant-General
- Service number: 4670
- Units: Royal Artillery; 7th Hussars; 10th Royal Hussars
- Commands: 7th Queen's Own Hussars; 10th Royal Hussars
- Conflicts: First World War; Arab revolt in Palestine; Second World War
- Awards: Knight Commander of the Order of the British Empire; Companion of the Order of the Bath; Mentioned in Despatches (10)

Lieutenant-General Sir Balfour Oliphant Hutchison, KBE, CB (12 February 1889 – 26 April 1967) was a British Army officer who served in both the First and Second World Wars.

== Early life and First World War ==
Born on 12 February 1889, Hutchison was the son of Alexander Hutchison, of Braehead, Kirkcaldy, Fife. His older brother, Robert, later became a politician and a senior officer in the British Army. After attending Uppingham School, Hutchison received a commission as a second lieutenant into the Royal Artillery Supplementary Reserve on 26 June 1909. On 9 December 1911 Hutchison transferred to the 7th Hussars, and received a promotion to lieutenant on 9 August 1913. During the First World War Hutchison served with his regiment in the Mesopotamian campaign, and was mentioned in despatches four times.

== Between the wars ==
Remaining in the army during the interwar period, Hutchison served in a variety of staff and regimental appointments, including as a General Staff Officer (GSO) with the Mediterranean Expeditionary Force, before returning to the United Kingdom and attending the Staff College, Camberley as a student from 1923 to 1924. His fellow students there included Montagu Stopford, Michael Gambier-Parry, Dudley Johnson, Gordon Macready, Arthur Percival, Frederick Pile, Edmond Schreiber and John Smyth, all of whom, with the exception of Smyth, were destined to become general officers. He then served for two years as a staff captain with Scottish Command, before being sent to Northern China, joining the Shanghai Defence Force as a staff captain, later being made Deputy Assistant Quartermaster-General.

Returning to the United Kingdom in early 1928, Hutchison served with Eastern Command as Deputy Adjutant and Quartermaster-General. He transferred to the 10th Royal Hussars on 11 October 1930, and from 1935 to 1937 he succeeded Willoughby Norrie as commanding officer of the regiment. From October 1937 until November 1938, he served as assistant adjutant and quartermaster-general to the Mobile Division, commanded by Major-General Alan Brooke, who had been one of Hutchison's instructors at the Staff College.

== Second World War ==
Hutchison was invested as a Commander of the Order of the British Empire in 1940, when he was Deputy Quartermaster-General, Middle East, and with it came a promotion to the acting rank of major general. He was invested as a Companion of the Order of the Bath in 1941. He gained the rank of major-general on 17 January 1942, when he was General Officer Commanding Sudan and Eritrea. He gained the rank of honorary lieutenant-general on 10 December 1945 upon retirement as Quartermaster-General, Army Headquarters India. He was invested as a Knight Commander of the Order of the British Empire in 1946. He was mentioned in despatches several times during the war, including on 26 July 1940.

== Personal life ==
Hutchison married Audrey Jervis-White-Jervis, daughter of Herbert Jervis-White-Jervis and Beatrice Ruggles-Brise, on 28 January 1920. They had five children. He lived at Rendham Court, Rendham, Saxmundham, Suffolk, where he died on 26 April 1967.

== Bibliography ==
- Smart, Nick (2005). Biographical Dictionary of British Generals of the Second World War. Barnsley, South Yorkshire: Pen and Sword Books. ISBN 1844150496.

Military offices
Preceded by Noel Beresford-Peirse	Commandant of the Sudan Defence Force; 1942–1943	Succeeded by William Ramsden
