= 1932 Montrose Burghs by-election =

UK Parliamentary by-election

The 1932 Montrose Burghs by-election was held on 28 June 1932. The by-election was held due to the succession to the peerage of the incumbent Liberal National MP, Robert Hutchison. It was won by the Liberal National candidate Charles Kerr.

By-election 1932: Montrose Burghs
Party	Candidate	Votes	%	±%
National Liberal	Charles Kerr	7,963	46.9	−30.1
Labour	Tom Kennedy	7,030	41.4	+18.4
National (Scotland)	Douglas Emslie	1,996	11.7	New
Majority		933	5.5	−48.5
Turnout		16,989	56.7	−17.9
National Liberal hold		Swing		
