= 1940 Montrose Burghs by-election =

UK Parliamentary by-election

The 1940 Montrose Burghs by-election was held on 5 July 1940. The by-election was held due to the elevation to the peerage of the incumbent Liberal National MP, Charles Kerr. It was won by the unopposed Liberal National candidate John Maclay. Due to the war time electoral truce, the Labour and Liberal parties did not put up any candidates.
