= Robert Hutchison, 1st Baron Hutchison of Montrose =

Scottish soldier and Liberal politician

Major-General The Right Honourable The Lord Hutchison of Montrose KCMG CB DSO PC
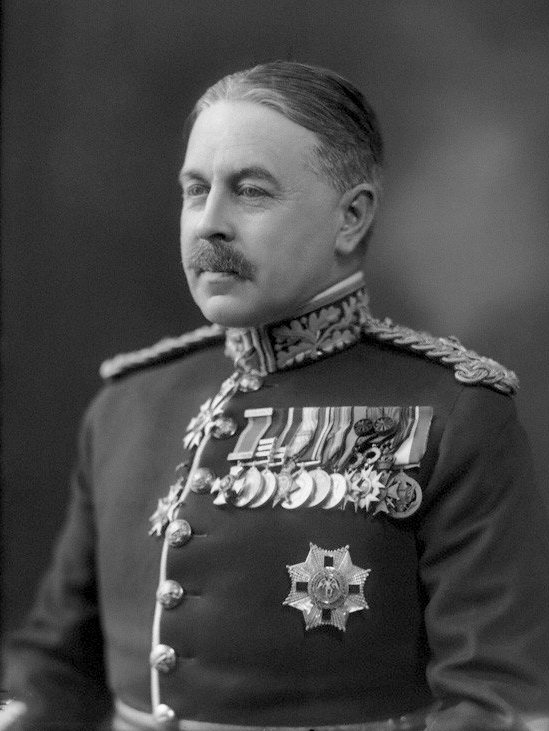
- Hutchison in 1923

Paymaster General
- In office 6 December 1935 – 2 June 1938
- Prime Minister: Stanley Baldwin; Neville Chamberlain
- Preceded by: Ernest Lamb
- Succeeded by: Geoffrey FitzClarence

Chief Whip of the Liberal Party
- In office 8 November 1926 – 6 November 1930
- Leader: David Lloyd George
- Preceded by: Godfrey Collins
- Succeeded by: Archibald Sinclair

Deputy Liberal Chief Whip in the House of Commons
- In office 8 November 1924 – 8 November 1926
- Leader: David Lloyd George
- Chief Whip: Godfrey Collins
- Preceded by: James Hogge
- Succeeded by: Murdoch McKenzie Wood

Member of the House of Lords Lord Temporal
- In office 5 July 1932 – 13 June 1950; Hereditary peerage
- Preceded by: Peerage created
- Succeeded by: Peerage Extinct

Member of Parliament for Montrose Burghs
- In office 29 October 1924 – 3 June 1932
- Preceded by: John Sturrock
- Succeeded by: Charles Kerr

Member of Parliament for Kirkcaldy Burghs
- In office 15 November 1922 – 6 December 1923
- Preceded by: Tom Kennedy
- Succeeded by: Tom Kennedy

Personal details
- Born: Robert Hutchison; 5 September 1873
- Died: 13 June 1950 (aged 76)
- Party: Liberal National (1931–1950)
- Other political affiliations: National Liberal (1922–1923); Liberal (1923–1930); Independent Liberal (1930–1931)
- Parent: Alexander Hutchison (father)
- Relatives: Balfour Oliphant Hutchison (brother)

Military service
- Allegiance: United Kingdom
- Branch/service: British Army
- Rank: Major-General
- Battles/wars: Second Boer War; First World War
- Awards: Knight Commander of the Order of St Michael and St George; Companion of the Order of the Bath; Distinguished Service Order; Mentioned in Despatches (6); Legion of Honour (France); Order of the Crown (Belgium); Croix de guerre (Belgium); Army Distinguished Service Medal (United States)

Major-General Robert Hutchison, 1st Baron Hutchison of Montrose, KCMG, CB, DSO, PC (5 September 1873 – 13 June 1950) was a British Army officer and Liberal politician.

== Early life ==
Hutchison was the son of Alexander Hutchison, of Braehead, Kirkcaldy, Fife. His younger brother Sir Balfour Hutchison (1889–1967) was a lieutenant general in the British Army.

== Military career ==
Hutchison was a lieutenant in the Fifeshire Artillery Militia when he received a regular commission as a second lieutenant in the 7th Dragoon Guards on 10 February 1900. He was promoted to lieutenant on 3 October 1900. The following year he was seconded to the Imperial Yeomanry, serving in the Second Boer War in South Africa, where he was appointed lieutenant and adjutant of the 12th Battalion on 25 November 1901, with the temporary rank of captain from the same day. He relinquished his appointment as adjutant and his temporary appointment as captain on 12 May 1902, shortly before the end of the war, and left Cape Town the following month, returning home on SS Plassy. In late August he was back with his regiment. He was promoted to the substantive rank of captain with the 11th Hussars in 1905 and major with the 4th Dragoon Guards in 1913. He was a General Staff Officer, 3rd Grade, 1912–1914, and promoted to 2nd Grade in 1914. He served in the First World War as General Staff Officer, 1st Grade, 1915–1917; temporary major general and Director of Organisation at the War Office from May 1917 to 1919; DAG 1919. He was Mentioned in Despatches six times, and awarded the Distinguished Service Order in 1915, appointed a Companion of the Order of the Bath in 1918, and knighted as a Knight Commander of the Order of St Michael and St George in 1919. He was also awarded the Belgian Order of the Crown and Croix de guerre, the French Legion of Honour, and the American Army Distinguished Service Medal. He was promoted to colonel on 2 June 1919.

He retired from the army in 1923.

== Political career ==
Hutchison was National Liberal Member of Parliament for Kirkcaldy Burghs from 1922 to 1923, Liberal member for Montrose Burghs from 1924 to 1931 and Liberal National member for that constituency from 1931 to 1932. He served as Scottish National Liberal Whip in 1923, as a Liberal Whip from 1924 to 1926 and as Liberal Chief Whip from 1926 to 1930.

On his retirement from the House of Commons in 1932, he was raised to the peerage as Baron Hutchison of Montrose, of Kirkcaldy in the County of Fife. He later served under Stanley Baldwin and Neville Chamberlain as Paymaster General from 1935 to 1938 and was appointed a Privy Counsellor in 1937.

=== Elections contested ===
==== UK Parliament elections ====
Date of election	Constituency	Party	Votes	%	Result
1922	Kirkcaldy Burghs	National Liberal	12,762	51.4	Elected
1923	Kirkcaldy Burghs	Liberal	11,937	45.6	Not elected (2nd)
1924	Montrose Burghs	Liberal	9,226	57.2	Elected
1929	Montrose Burghs	Liberal	11,715	55.5	Elected
1931	Montrose Burghs	Liberal National	17,212	77.0	Elected

== Personal life ==
Lord Hutchison of Montrose married firstly Agnes, daughter of William Drysdale, in 1905. After her death he married secondly Alma, daughter of W. G. Cowes, in 1942. He died in June 1950, aged 76, when the barony became extinct.

Apart from his military and political careers he was a director of the National Bank of Australasia, Phœnix Assurance Co., and other business interests.

Parliament of the United Kingdom
Preceded by Tom Kennedy	Member of Parliament for Kirkcaldy Burghs; 1922–1923	Succeeded by Tom Kennedy
Preceded by John Sturrock	Member of Parliament for Montrose Burghs; 1924–1932	Succeeded by Charles Kerr
Party political offices
Preceded by Murdoch McKenzie Wood	Deputy Liberal Chief Whip; 1924–1926	Succeeded by Thomas Fenby
Preceded by Godfrey Collins	Liberal Chief Whip; 1926–1930	Succeeded by Archibald Sinclair
Political offices
Preceded by The Lord Rochester	Paymaster General; 1935–1938	Succeeded by The Earl of Munster
Peerage of the United Kingdom
New creation	Baron Hutchison of Montrose; 1932–1950	Extinct
