= Montrose Burghs =

Parliamentary constituency in the United Kingdom, 1832–1950

- Former district of burghs constituency for the House of Commons

1832–1950
- Seats: One
- Created from: Aberdeen Burghs and Perth Burghs
- Replaced by: North Angus & Mearns and South Angus

Montrose Burghs was a district of burghs constituency represented in the House of Commons of the Parliament of the United Kingdom from 1832 until 1950.

The constituency elected one Member of Parliament (MP) to represent the parliamentary burghs of Montrose, Arbroath, Brechin, Forfar and Inverbervie.

In 1950, Montrose, Brechin and Inverbervie were merged into North Angus and Mearns, and Arbroath and Forfar were merged into South Angus.

== Members of Parliament ==
Election	Member	Party
1832	Horatio Ross	Whig
1835	Patrick Chalmers	Radical
1842 by-election	Joseph Hume	Radical
1855 by-election	William Edward Baxter	Radical
1859	William Edward Baxter	Liberal
1885	John Shiress Will	Liberal
1896 by-election	John Morley	Liberal
1908 by-election	Robert Harcourt	Liberal
1918	John Sturrock	Coalition Liberal
1922	John Sturrock	National Liberal
1923	John Sturrock	Liberal
1924	Robert Hutchison	Liberal
1930	Robert Hutchison	Independent Liberal
1931	Robert Hutchison	National Liberal
1932 by-election	Charles Kerr	National Liberal
1940 by-election	John Maclay	National Liberal
1950	constituency abolished: see North Angus & Mearns and South Angus	

== Elections ==
=== Elections in the 1830s ===
General election 1832: Montrose Burghs
Party	Candidate	Votes	%
Whig	Horatio Ross	796	59.8
Radical	Patrick Chalmers	535	40.2
Majority		261	19.6
Turnout		1,331	89.1
Registered electors		1,494	
Whig win (new seat)			

General election 1835: Montrose Burghs
Party	Candidate	Votes	%
Radical	Patrick Chalmers	Unopposed	
Registered electors		1,551	
Radical gain from Whig			

General election 1837: Montrose Burghs
Party	Candidate	Votes	%
Radical	Patrick Chalmers	Unopposed	
Registered electors		1,636	
Radical hold			

=== Elections in the 1840s ===
General election 1841: Montrose Burghs
Party	Candidate	Votes	%	±%
Radical	Patrick Chalmers	Unopposed		
Registered electors		1,403		
Radical hold				

Chalmers resigned by accepting the office of Steward of the Manor of Northstead, causing a by-election.

By-election, 16 April 1842: Montrose Burghs
Party	Candidate	Votes	%	±%
Radical	Joseph Hume	Unopposed		
Radical hold				

General election 1847: Montrose Burghs
Party	Candidate	Votes	%	±%
Radical	Joseph Hume	532	69.7	N/A
Radical	David Greenhill	231	30.3	N/A
Majority		301	39.4	N/A
Turnout		763	64.8	N/A
Registered electors		1,178		
Radical hold		Swing	N/A	

=== Elections in the 1850s ===
General election 1852: Montrose Burghs
Party	Candidate	Votes	%	±%
Radical	Joseph Hume	Unopposed		
Registered electors		1,586		
Radical hold				

Hume's death caused a by-election.

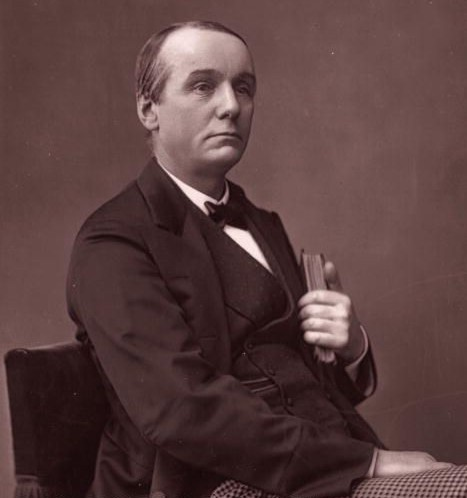
William Baxter

By-election, 9 March 1855: Montrose Burghs
Party	Candidate	Votes	%	±%
Radical	William Edward Baxter	478	52.4	N/A
Whig	John Ogilvy	434	47.6	N/A
Majority		44	4.8	N/A
Turnout		912	57.5	N/A
Registered electors		1,585		
Radical hold		Swing	N/A	

General election 1857: Montrose Burghs
Party	Candidate	Votes	%	±%
Radical	William Edward Baxter	Unopposed		
Registered electors		1,575		
Radical hold				

General election 1859: Montrose Burghs
Party	Candidate	Votes	%	±%
Liberal	William Edward Baxter	Unopposed		
Registered electors		1,651		
Liberal hold				

=== Elections in the 1860s ===
General election 1865: Montrose Burghs
Party	Candidate	Votes	%	±%
Liberal	William Edward Baxter	Unopposed		
Registered electors		1,806		
Liberal hold				

General election 1868: Montrose Burghs
Party	Candidate	Votes	%	±%
Liberal	William Edward Baxter	3,199	75.7	N/A
Conservative	William Macdonald Macdonald	1,027	24.3	New
Majority		2,172	51.4	N/A
Turnout		4,226	66.7	N/A
Registered electors		6,337		
Liberal hold		Swing	N/A	

=== Elections in the 1870s ===
General election 1874: Montrose Burghs
Party	Candidate	Votes	%	±%
Liberal	William Edward Baxter	3,333	64.0	−11.7
Conservative	William Macdonald Macdonald	1,875	36.0	+11.7
Majority		1,458	28.0	−23.4
Turnout		5,208	66.0	−0.7
Registered electors		7,891		
Liberal hold		Swing	−11.7	

=== Elections in the 1880s ===
General election 1880: Montrose Burghs
Party	Candidate	Votes	%	±%
Liberal	William Edward Baxter	Unopposed		
Registered electors		8,343		
Liberal hold				

John Shiress Will

General election 1885: Montrose Burghs
Party	Candidate	Votes	%	±%
Liberal	John Shiress Will	3,532	49.9	N/A
Independent Liberal	Alexander Gordon	2,779	39.3	New
Conservative	Alexander Mackenzie	763	10.8	New
Majority		753	10.6	N/A
Turnout		7,074	78.9	N/A
Registered electors		8,963		
Liberal hold		Swing	N/A	

General election 1886: Montrose Burghs
Party	Candidate	Votes	%	±%
Liberal	John Shiress Will	3,357	61.7	+11.8
Liberal Unionist	Arthur Patton	2,088	38.3	+27.5
Majority		1,269	23.4	+12.8
Turnout		5,445	60.7	−18.2
Registered electors		8,963		
Liberal hold		Swing	+6.4	

=== Elections in the 1890s ===
General election 1892: Montrose Burghs
Party	Candidate	Votes	%	±%
Liberal	John Shiress Will	3,941	65.3	+3.6
Liberal Unionist	Robert Arthur Lockhart	2,090	34.7	−3.6
Majority		1,851	30.6	+7.2
Turnout		6,031	71.5	+10.8
Registered electors		8,436		
Liberal hold		Swing	+3.6	

General election 1895: Montrose Burghs
Party	Candidate	Votes	%	±%
Liberal	John Shiress Will	3,594	59.3	−6.0
Liberal Unionist	George Washington Baxter	2,462	40.7	+6.0
Majority		1,132	18.6	−12.0
Turnout		6,056	71.4	−0.1
Registered electors		8,484		
Liberal hold		Swing	−6.0	

John Morley

1896 Montrose Burghs by-election
Party	Candidate	Votes	%	±%
Liberal	John Morley	4,565	64.0	+4.7
Conservative	John Wilson	2,572	36.0	−4.7
Majority		1,993	28.0	+9.4
Turnout		7,137	82.1	+10.7
Registered electors		8,692		
Liberal hold		Swing	+4.7	

=== Elections in the 1900s ===
General election 1900: Montrose Burghs
Party	Candidate	Votes	%	±%
Liberal	John Morley	3,960	62.4	+3.1
Liberal Unionist	John Birrell Don	2,390	37.6	−3.1
Majority		1,570	24.8	+6.2
Turnout		6,350	71.5	+0.1
Registered electors		8,881		
Liberal hold		Swing	+3.1	

General election 1906: Montrose Burghs
Party	Candidate	Votes	%	±%
Liberal	John Morley	4,416	69.7	+7.3
Conservative	Alexander Sprot	1,922	30.3	−7.3
Majority		2,494	39.4	+14.6
Turnout		6,338	75.7	+4.2
Registered electors		8,373		
Liberal hold		Swing	+7.3	

Montrose Burghs by-election, 1908
Party	Candidate	Votes	%	±%
Liberal	Robert Harcourt	3,083	46.7	−23.0
Ind. Labour Party	Joseph Burgess	1,937	29.4	New
Conservative	Andrew Constable	1,576	23.9	−6.4
Majority		1,146	17.3	−22.1
Turnout		6,596	80.4	+4.7
Registered electors		8,205		
Liberal hold		Swing	−8.3	

=== Elections in the 1910s ===
General election January 1910: Montrose Burghs
Party	Candidate	Votes	%	±%
Liberal	Robert Harcourt	3,606	50.9	−18.8
Ind. Labour Party	Joseph Burgess	1,888	26.6	N/A
Conservative	William Low	1,592	22.5	−7.8
Majority		1,718	24.3	−15.1
Turnout		7,086	84.2	+8.5
Registered electors		8,414		
Liberal hold		Swing	−5.5	

General election December 1910: Montrose Burghs
Party	Candidate	Votes	%	±%
Liberal	Robert Harcourt	3,878	64.3	+13.4
Conservative	William Low	2,155	35.7	+13.2
Majority		1,723	28.6	+4.3
Turnout		6,033	72.0	−12.2
Registered electors		8,383		
Liberal hold		Swing	+0.1	

General Election 1914–15:

Another General Election was required to take place before the end of 1915. The political parties had been making preparations for an election to take place and by July 1914, the following candidates had been selected;

- Liberal: Robert Harcourt
- Unionist: John Hossell Henderson
- Labour: James Maxton

General election 1918: Montrose Burghs
Party		Candidate	Votes	%	±%
C	Liberal	John Sturrock	9,309	76.0	+11.7
	Labour	H. N. Brailsford	2,940	24.0	New
Majority			6,369	52.0	+23.4
Turnout			12,249	49.1	−22.9
Registered electors			24,956		
	Liberal hold		Swing	N/A	
C indicates candidate endorsed by the coalition government.

=== Elections in the 1920s ===
General election 1922: Montrose Burghs
Party	Candidate	Votes	%	±%
National Liberal	John Sturrock	8,407	54.4	−21.6
Labour	John Carnegie	7,044	45.6	+21.6
Majority		1,363	8.8	−43.2
Turnout		15,451	62.7	+13.6
Registered electors		24,628		
National Liberal gain from Liberal		Swing	−21.6	

General election 1923: Montrose Burghs
Party	Candidate	Votes	%	±%
Liberal	John Sturrock	8,717	55.3	+0.9
Labour	John Carnegie	7,032	44.7	−0.9
Majority		1,685	10.6	+1.8
Turnout		15,749	62.9	+0.2
Registered electors		25,031		
Liberal hold		Swing	+0.9	

General election 1924: Montrose Burghs
Party	Candidate	Votes	%	±%
Liberal	Robert Hutchison	9,226	57.2	+1.9
Labour	Thomas Barron	6,914	42.8	−1.9
Majority		2,312	14.4	+3.8
Turnout		16,140	68.5	+5.6
Registered electors		23,568		
Liberal hold		Swing	+1.9	

General election 1929: Montrose Burghs
Party	Candidate	Votes	%	±%
Liberal	Robert Hutchison	11,715	55.5	−1.7
Labour	Thomas Irwin	9,381	44.5	+1.7
Majority		2,334	11.0	−3.4
Turnout		21,096	71.3	+2.8
Registered electors		29,573		
Liberal hold		Swing	−1.7	

=== Elections in the 1930s ===
General election 1931: Montrose Burghs
Party	Candidate	Votes	%	±%
National Liberal	Robert Hutchison	17,212	77.0	N/A
Labour	Arthur Fraser Macintosh	5,137	23.0	−21.5
Majority		12,075	54.0	+43.0
Turnout		22,349	74.6	+3.3
National Liberal hold		Swing		

1932 Montrose Burghs by-election
Party	Candidate	Votes	%	±%
National Liberal	Charles Kerr	7,963	46.9	−30.1
Labour	Tom Kennedy	7,030	41.4	+18.4
National (Scotland)	Douglas Emslie	1,996	11.7	New
Majority		933	5.5	−48.5
Turnout		16,989	56.7	−17.9
National Liberal hold		Swing		

General election 1935: Montrose Burghs
Party	Candidate	Votes	%	±%
National Liberal	Charles Kerr	15,198	69.6	−7.4
Labour	James Erskine Harper	6,632	30.4	+7.4
Majority		8,566	39.2	−14.8
Turnout		21,830	70.6	−4.0
National Liberal hold		Swing		

General Election 1939–40

Another General Election was required to take place before the end of 1940. The political parties had been making preparations for an election to take place and by the Autumn of 1939, the following candidates had been selected;

- Liberal National: John Maclay
- Labour: Olive R Crutchley

=== Elections in the 1940s ===
1940 Montrose Burghs by-election
Party	Candidate	Votes	%	±%
National Liberal	John Maclay	Unopposed	N/A	N/A
National Liberal hold				

General election 1945: Montrose Burghs
Party	Candidate	Votes	%	±%
National Liberal	John Maclay	13,966	58.2	−11.4
Labour	Thomas Alexander MacNair	10,011	41.8	+11.4
Majority		3,955	16.4	−22.8
Turnout		24,007	72.3	+1.7
National Liberal hold		Swing		
