= List of MPs for constituencies in Wales (1923–1924) =

- 6 December 1923
- Colours on map indicate the party allegiance of each constituency's MP.

This is a list of members of Parliament in Wales, elected to the House of Commons of the United Kingdom in the 1923 general election.

== Composition ==
| Affiliation | Members |
|---|---|
| Labour Party | 19 |
| Liberal Party | 11 |
| Conservative Party | 4 |
| Independent Liberal | 1 |
| Christian Pacafist | 1 |
| Total | 36 |

== MPs ==
| MP | Constituency | Party | In constituency since |
|---|---|---|---|
| George Barker | Abertillery | Labour Party | 1920 by-election |
| Reginald Clarry | Newport | Conservative Party | 1922 by-election |
| William Cope | Llandaff and Barry | Conservative Party | 1918 |
| David Davies | Montgomeryshire | Liberal Party | 1906 |
| Ellis Davies | Denbigh | Liberal Party | 1923 |
| Evan Davies | Ebbw Vale | Labour Party | 1920 by-election |
| Charles Edwards | Bedwellty | Labour Party | 1918 |
| Ellis Ellis-Griffith | Carmarthen | Liberal Party | 1923 |
| Leolin Forestier-Walker | Monmouth | Conservative Party | 1918 |
| James Childs Gould | Cardiff Central | Conservative Party | 1918 |
| Thomas Griffiths | Pontypool | Labour Party | 1918 |
| John Henry Williams | Llanelly | Labour Party | 1922 |
| David Grenfell | Gower | Labour Party | 1922 |
| George Hall | Aberdare | Labour Party | 1922 |
| Vernon Hartshorn | Ogmore | Labour Party | 1918 |
| Arthur Henderson Jr. | Cardiff South | Labour Party | 1923 |
| William Jenkins | Neath | Labour Party | 1922 |
| William Jenkins | Brecon and Radnor | Liberal Party | 1923 |
| William John | Rhondda West | Labour Party | 1920 by-election |
| Henry Haydn Jones | Merioneth | Liberal Party | January 1910 |
| Morgan Jones | Caerphilly | Labour Party | 1921 by-election |
| Thomas Mardy Jones | Pontypridd | Labour Party | 1922 by-election |
| David Lloyd George | Caernarvon Boroughs | Liberal Party | 1890 |
| Gwilym Lloyd George | Pembrokeshire | Liberal Party | 1922 |
| Ramsay MacDonald | Aberavon | Labour Party | 1922 |
| Rhys Hopkin Morris | Cardiganshire | Independent Liberal | 1923 |
| Goronwy Owen | Caernarvonshire | Liberal Party | 1923 |
| Tom Parry | Flintshire | Liberal Party | 1918 |
| Robert Richards | Wrexham | Labour Party | 1922 |
| Howel Samuel | Swansea West | Labour Party | 1923 |
| Robert Thomas | Anglesey | Liberal Party | 1923 |
| R. C. Wallhead | Merthyr | Labour Party | 1922 |
| Henry Webb | Cardiff East | Liberal Party | 1923 |
| David Watts-Morgan | Rhondda East | Labour Party | 1918 |
| David Williams | Swansea East | Labour Party | 1922 |
| George Davies | University of Wales | Christian Pacifist | 1923 |

== By-elections ==
- 1924 Carmarthen by-election

== See also ==
- List of MPs elected in the 1923 United Kingdom general election
- 1923 United Kingdom general election
- 1923 United Kingdom general election in Wales
