= 1923 United Kingdom general election in Wales =

- 6 December 1923

All 36 Welsh seats to the House of Commons
- Turnout: 77.3% (▼2.1 pp)
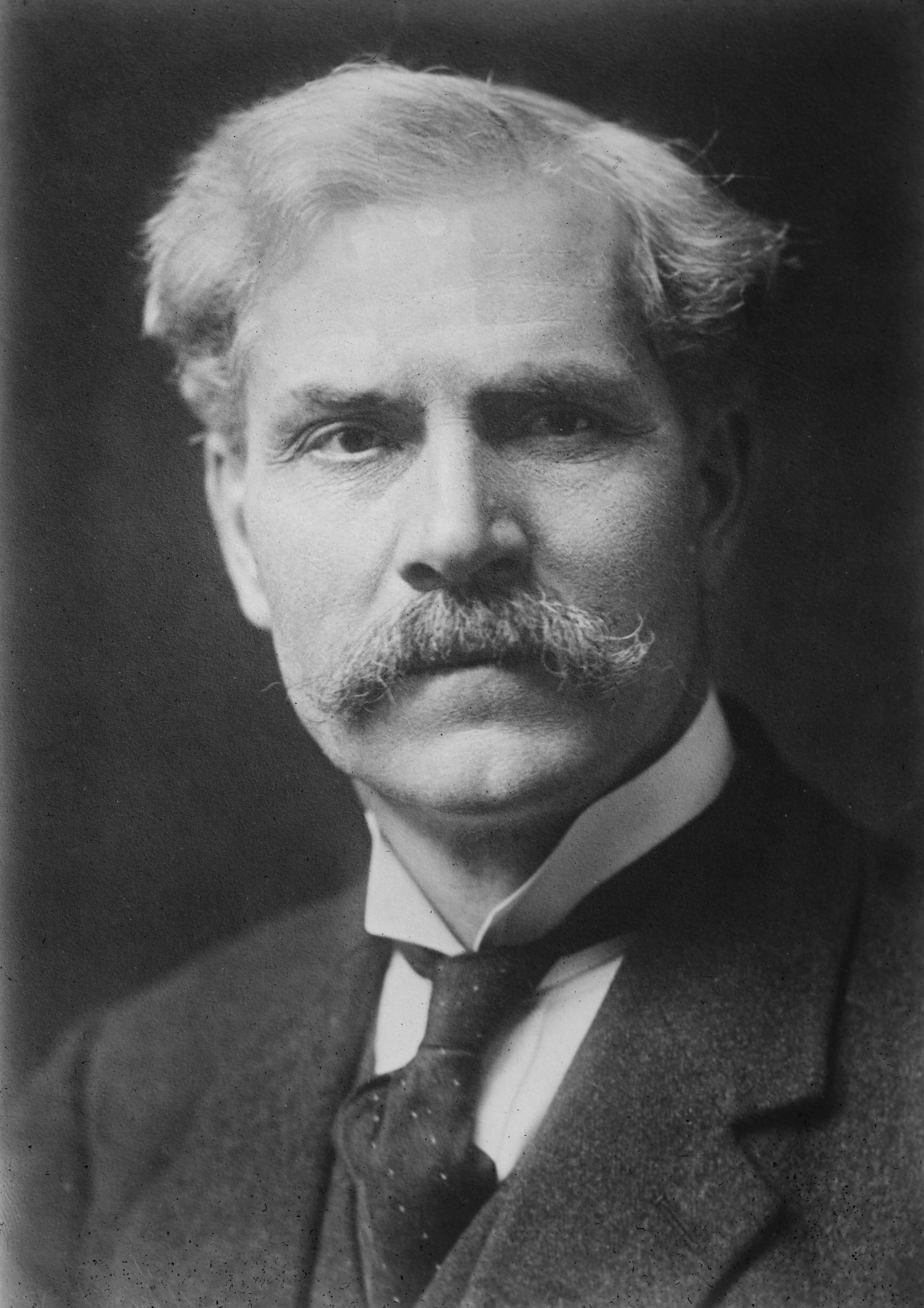

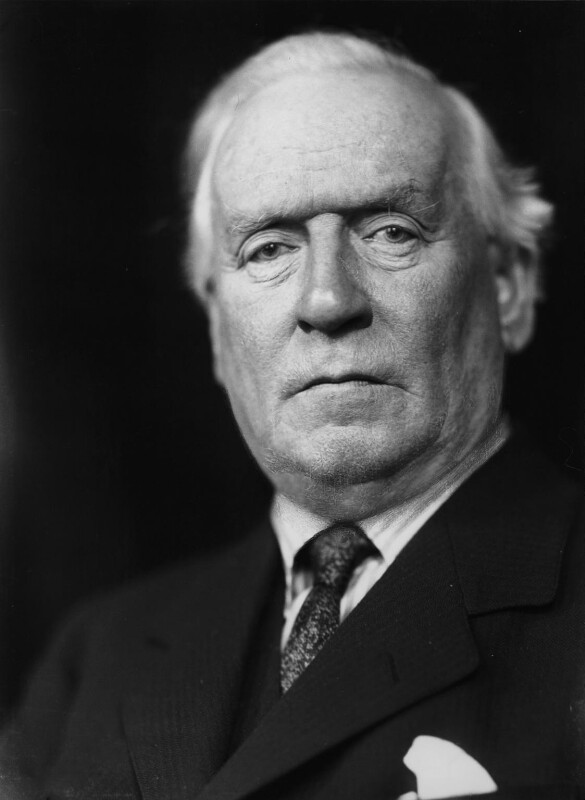

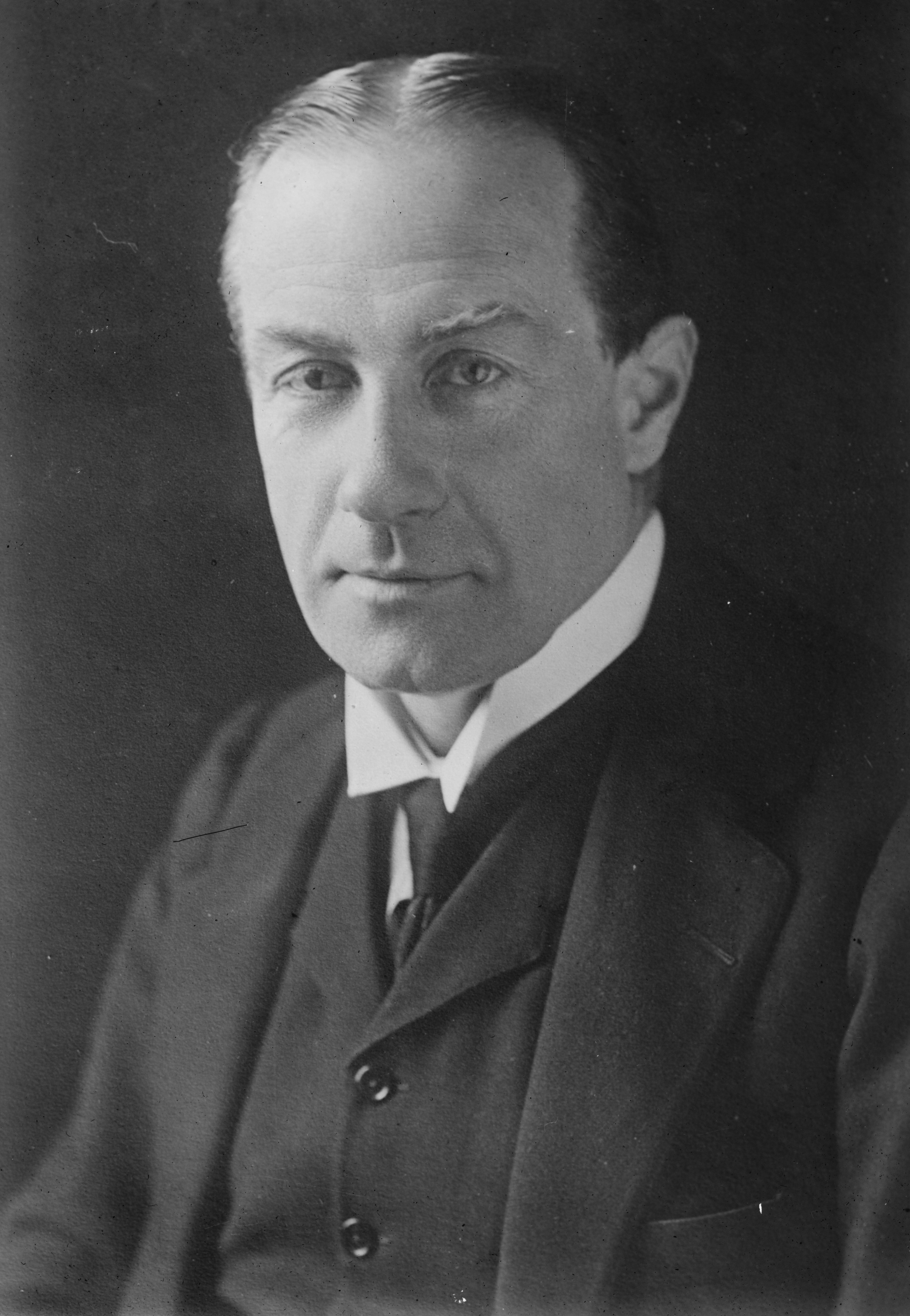
	First party	Second party	Third party
Leader	Ramsay MacDonald	H. H. Asquith	Stanley Baldwin
Party	Labour	Liberal	Conservative
Leader since	22 November 1922	30 April 1908	23 May 1923
Leader's seat	Aberavon	Paisley	Bewdley
Last election	18 seats, (Note: Combined results for county, borough and university seats.); 40.7%	11 seats, (Note: The Liberal Party total and change is compared to the combined Liberal and National Liberal total in 1922) 34.2%	6 seats, 21.4%
Seats won	19	11	4
Seat change	▲1	Steady	▼2
Popular vote	355,172 (Note: Total and percentage votes given here are for territorial constituencies only.)	299,314	178,113
Percentage	42.0%	35.4%	21.1%
Swing	▲1.3 pp	▲1.2 pp	▼0.3 pp

On Thursday 6 December 1923, the 1923 United Kingdom general election was held in Wales, to elect all 615 members of the House of Commons, with 36 constituencies being in Wales. 35 seats represented territorial constituencies contested under the first past the post electoral system, and one additional seat represented the University of Wales which was also contested under the first past the post electoral system.

The election led to an overall drop in seats for the Conservative Party, with the Liberal Party and Labor taking seats across the United Kingdom. The election saw the formation of the first Labour Government under Prime Minister Ramsay MacDonald, with the support of the reunited Liberal Party under H. H. Asquith; however, the Labour Government would only survive a year, owning to a vote of confidence the following year.

== Candidates ==
Below is a table summarising the candidates of the 1923 general election in Wales, excluding those in the University of Wales constituency.

Affiliation	Candidates
Liberal Party	31
Labour Party	27
Conservative and Unionist Party	19
Independent Liberal	1 (Note: Candidate Rhys Hopkin Morris stood in the seat of Cardiganshire.)
Total	78

== Analysis ==
The Liberal Party, which had reunited on 13 November 1923 under the leadership of H. H. Asquith, increased its number of seats to 11 seats in total in Wales. The party retained Anglesey. The former National Liberal Party had gained the seat in the 1923 Anglesey by-election after the death of incumbent Independent Labour Member of Parliament Owen Thomas, and had subsequently reunited with the Liberal Party. The retention represented a gain from the previous election. The party also gained Caernarvonshire from the Labour Party and Cardiff East from the Conservative Party.

Conversely, Rhys Hopkin Morris, who was initially a member of the Liberal Party, stood in and won the seat of Cardiganshire. Morris had previous run in the seat in 1922 as a member of Liberal Party, narrowly losing it to then National Liberal member Ernest Evans. In this election, Morris ran against Evans, despite Evans returning to the Liberal Party along with all other former Liberal National Members of Parliament in Wales, surprisingly winning the seat against him. Morris would, however, return of the Liberal Party benches in 1924.

The Labour Party gained Swansea West from the Liberals, which was initially held by the dissolved National Liberal Party, representing a loss of the reunited Liberal Party. It also gained Cardiff South from the Conservative Party. Combined with this loss, the Conservatives lost a total of two seats to both Labour and the Liberal Party.

Within the University of Wales constituency, the National Liberal Party had dissolved. The Liberal Party and an Independent Liberal stood in the seat, however it was won by Christian Pacifist candidate George Davies. Davies would go on to take the Labour Party whip, despite never joining the party.

== County and borough constituency results ==
Below is a table summarising the constituency results of the 1923 general election in Wales, excluding the result in the University of Wales constituency.

Party	Seats					Aggregate votes		
Party	Total	Gains	Losses	Net	Of total (%)	Total	Of total (%)	Change (%)
Labour	19	2	1	▲1	54.3	355,172	42.0	▲1.3
Liberal	11	3	2	▲1	31.4	299,314	35.4	▲1.2
Conservative	4	0	2	▼2	11.4	178,113	21.1	▼0.3
Independent Liberal	1 (Note: Rhys Hopkin Morris won the seat of Cardiganshire as an Independent Liberal, however he would join as a sitting Member of Parliament for Liberal Party in 1924.)	New		▲1	2.9	12,469	1.5	New
Other non-contested	0	0	1 (Note: The Liberal Party won the seat of Anglesey in a by-election after the death of incumbent Independent Labour Member of Parliament Owen Thomas. The party retained the seat.)	▼1	—	0	0.0	▼1.3
Total	35			0	100.0	845,068	100.0	0.0
Registered voters, and turnout						1,092,929 (Note: Electorate in contested constituencies. The total electorate was 1,258,973.)	77.3	▼2.1

Popular vote
Labour	42.0%
Liberal	35.4%
Conservative	21.1%
Ind. Liberal	1.5%

Popular vote
Labour	54.3%
Liberal	31.4%
Conservative	11.4%
Ind. Liberal	2.9%

== University of Wales result ==
Below is a table summarising the 1923 constituency results for seat of the University of Wales constituency. The independent candidate George Davies won the seat from the National Liberal Party, leaving the Liberal Party on a total of 11 seats, and bringing the total seats in Wales to 36.

General election 1923: University of Wales
Party	Candidate	Votes	%	±%
Christian Pacifist	George Davies	570	35.7	+10.9
Liberal	Joseph Jones	560	35.1	−0.8
Independent Liberal	John Edwards	467	29.2	New
Majority		10	0.6	N/A
Turnout		1.597	83.1	−4.1
Christian Pacifism gain from Liberal				

== See also ==
- 1923 United Kingdom general election in England
- 1923 United Kingdom general election in Scotland
- 1923 United Kingdom general election in Northern Ireland
- List of MPs for constituencies in Wales (1923–1924)
