= List of MPs elected in the 1923 United Kingdom general election =

1923–1924 Parliament of the United Kingdom
←	1922–1923 Parliament	1924–1929 Parliament	→
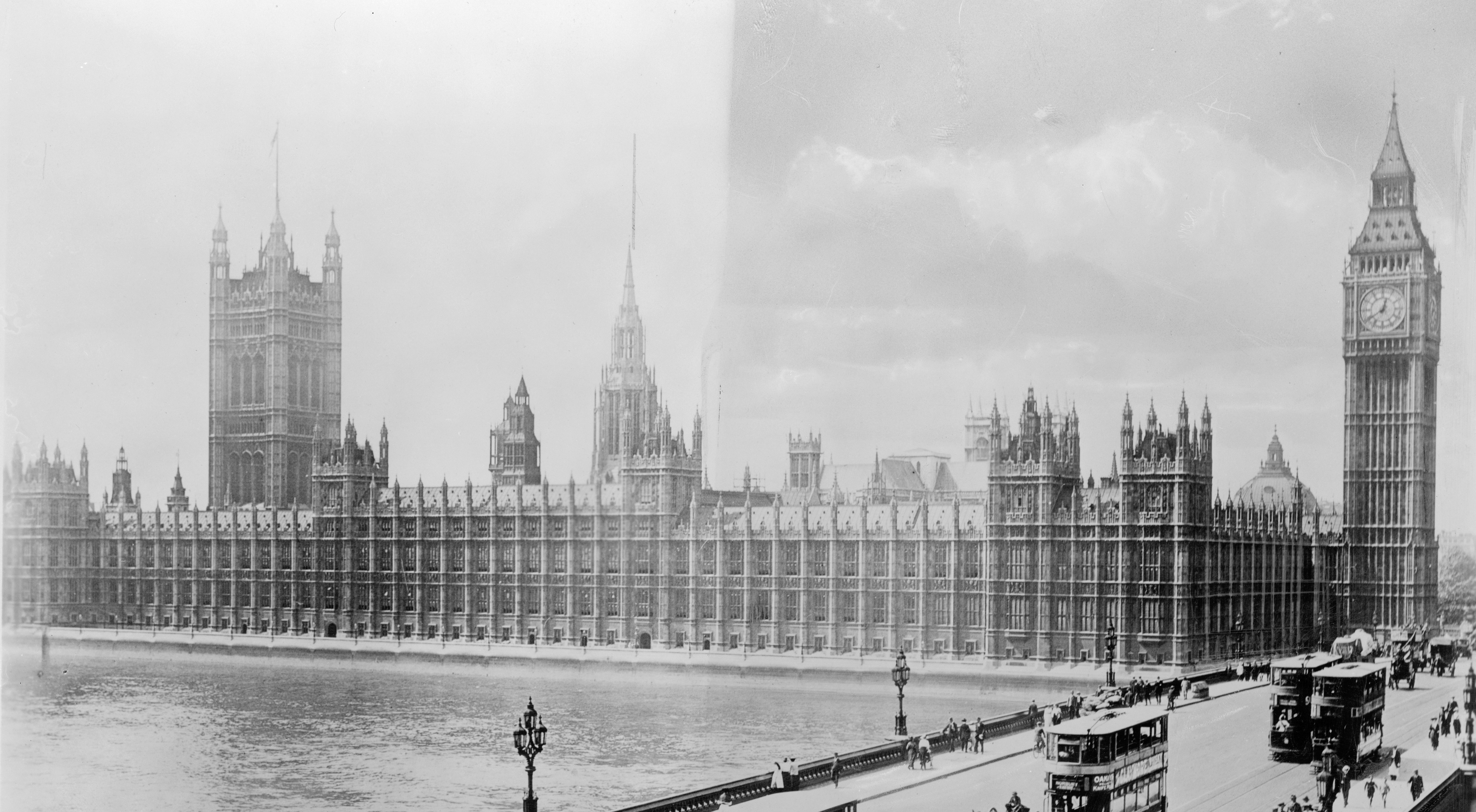
- Palace of Westminster in 1923

Overview
- Legislative body: Parliament of the United Kingdom
- Term: 6 December 1923 – 29 October 1924
- Election: 1923 United Kingdom general election
- Government: First MacDonald ministry

House of Commons
- Members: 615
- Speaker: John Henry Whitley
- Leader: Ramsay MacDonald
- Prime Minister: Ramsay MacDonald
- Leader of the Opposition: Stanley Baldwin
- Third-party leader: H. H. Asquith

House of Lords
- Lord Chancellor: George Cave, 1st Viscount Cave (until 1924); Richard Haldane, 1st Viscount Haldane (1924)
- Leader of the House of Lords: George Curzon, 1st Marquess Curzon of Kedleston (until 1924); Richard Haldane, 1st Viscount Haldane (1924)

Crown-in-Parliament George V

Sessions
- 1st: 8 January 1924 – 9 October 1924

This is a list of members of Parliament elected at the 1923 general election, held on 6 December. For a complete list of constituency elections results, see Constituency election results in the 1923 United Kingdom general election.

Table of contents:

A B C D E F G H I J K L M N O P Q R S T U V W X Y Z By-elections Changes

== A ==
Constituency	MP	Party
Aberavon	Ramsay MacDonald	Labour
Aberdare	George Hall	Labour
Aberdeen North	Frank Rose	Labour
Aberdeen South	Frederick Thomson	Conservative
Aberdeenshire Central	Murdoch McKenzie Wood	Liberal
Aberdeenshire East	Frederick Martin	Liberal
Aberdeenshire West and Kincardine	Malcolm Barclay-Harvey	Conservative
Abertillery	George Barker	Labour
Abingdon	Edward Lessing	Liberal
Accrington	Hugh Edwards	Liberal
Acton	Sir Harry Brittain	Conservative
Aldershot	Viscount Wolmer	Conservative
Altrincham	Robert Alstead	Liberal
Anglesey	Sir Robert Thomas, Bt	Liberal
Antrim (Two members)	Charles Craig	Ulster Unionist
Antrim (Two members)	Hon. Hugh O'Neill	Ulster Unionist
Argyll	Sir William Sutherland	Liberal
Armagh	William Allen	Ulster Unionist
Ashford	Samuel Strang Steel	Conservative
Ashton-under-Lyne	Sir Walter de Frece	Conservative
Aylesbury	Thomas Keens	Liberal
Ayr Burghs	Sir John Baird, Bt	Conservative
Ayrshire North and Bute	Aylmer Hunter-Weston	Conservative
Ayrshire South	James Brown	Labour
== B ==
Balham and Tooting	Sir Alfred Butt	Conservative
Banbury	Albert Edmondson	Conservative
Banff	Charles Barrie	Liberal
Barkston Ash	George Lane-Fox	Conservative
Barnard Castle	Moss Turner-Samuels	Labour
Barnsley	John Potts	Labour
Barnstaple	Tudor Rees	Liberal
Barrow-in-Furness	Daniel Somerville	Conservative
Basingstoke	Reginald Fletcher	Liberal
Bassetlaw	Sir Ellis Hume-Williams	Conservative
Bath	Frank Raffety	Liberal
Batley and Morley	Ben Turner	Labour
Battersea North	Henry Hogbin	Liberal
Battersea South	Francis Curzon	Conservative
Bedford	Sydney Wells	Conservative
Bedfordshire Mid	Frederick Linfield	Liberal
Bedwellty	Charles Edwards	Labour
Belfast, East	Herbert Dixon	Ulster Unionist
Belfast, North	Thomas McConnell	Ulster Unionist
Belfast, South	Thomas Moles	Ulster Unionist
Belfast, West	Sir Robert Lynn	Ulster Unionist
Belper	Herbert Wragg	Conservative
Bermondsey West	Roderick Kedward	Liberal
Berwick-on-Tweed	Mabel Philipson	Conservative
Berwick and Haddington	Robert Spence	Labour
Bethnal Green North-East	Walter Windsor	Labour
Bethnal Green South-West	Percy Harris	Liberal
Bewdley	Stanley Baldwin	Conservative
Birkenhead East	Graham White	Liberal
Birkenhead West	William Henry Egan	Labour
Birmingham Aston	Sir Evelyn Cecil	Conservative
Birmingham Deritend	Smedley Crooke	Conservative
Birmingham Duddeston	John Burman	Conservative
Birmingham Edgbaston	Sir Francis Lowe, Bt	Conservative
Birmingham Erdington	Sir Arthur Steel-Maitland, Bt	Conservative
Birmingham Handsworth	Oliver Locker-Lampson	Conservative
Birmingham King's Norton	Sir Herbert Austin	Conservative
Birmingham Ladywood	Neville Chamberlain	Conservative
Birmingham Moseley	Patrick Hannon	Conservative
Birmingham Sparkbrook	Leo Amery	Conservative
Birmingham West	Sir Austen Chamberlain	Conservative
Birmingham Yardley	Alfred Jephcott	Conservative
Bishop Auckland	Ben Spoor	Labour
Blackburn (Two members)	Sir Sydney Henn	Conservative
Blackburn (Two members)	John Duckworth	Liberal
Blackpool	Hugh Meyler	Liberal
Blaydon	William Whiteley	Labour
Bodmin	Isaac Foot	Liberal
Bolton (Two members)	Sir Herbert Cunliffe	Conservative
Bolton (Two members)	Albert Law	Labour
Bootle	James Burnie	Liberal
Bosworth	George Ward	Liberal
Bothwell	John Robertson	Labour
Bournemouth	Sir Henry Page Croft	Conservative
Bow and Bromley	George Lansbury	Labour
Bradford Central	William Leach	Labour
Bradford East	Fred Jowett	Labour
Bradford North	Walter Rea	Liberal
Bradford South	Herbert Harvey Spencer	Liberal
Brecon and Radnor	William Jenkins	Liberal
Brentford and Chiswick	Walter Morden	Conservative
Bridgwater	William Morse	Liberal
Brigg	Sir Berkeley Sheffield, Bt	Conservative
Brighton (Two members)	George Tryon	Conservative
Brighton (Two members)	Sir Cooper Rawson	Conservative
Bristol Central	Thomas Inskip	Conservative
Bristol East	Walter Baker	Labour
Bristol North	Walter Ayles	Labour
Bristol South	Sir Beddoe Rees	Liberal
Bristol West	George Gibbs	Conservative
Brixton	Frederick Laverack	Liberal
Bromley	Hon. Cuthbert James	Conservative
Broxtowe	George Spencer	Labour
Buckingham	George Bowyer	Conservative
Buckrose	Sir Guy Gaunt	Conservative
Burnley	Dan Irving	Labour
Burslem	William Edward Robinson	Liberal
Burton	John Gretton	Conservative
Bury	Charles Ainsworth	Conservative
Bury St Edmunds	Hon. Walter Guinness	Conservative
== C ==
Caerphilly	Morgan Jones	Labour
Caithness and Sutherland	Sir Archibald Sinclair, Bt	Liberal
Camberwell North	Charles Ammon	Labour
Camberwell North-West	Thomas Macnamara	Liberal
Camborne	Leif Jones	Liberal
Cambridge	Sir George Newton	Conservative
Cambridgeshire	Richard Briscoe	Conservative
Cambridge University (Two members)	John Rawlinson	Conservative
Cambridge University (Two members)	Sir Geoffrey G. Butler	Conservative
Cannock	William Adamson	Labour
Canterbury	Ronald McNeill	Conservative
Cardiff Central	James Childs Gould	Conservative
Cardiff East	Sir Henry Webb, Bt	Liberal
Cardiff South	Arthur Henderson	Labour
Cardiganshire	Rhys Hopkin Morris	Independent Liberal
Carlisle	George Middleton	Labour
Carmarthen	Sir Ellis Ellis-Griffith, Bt	Liberal
Carnarvon	David Lloyd George	Liberal
Carnarvonshire	Goronwy Owen	Liberal
Chatham	John Moore-Brabazon	Conservative
Chelmsford	Sydney Robinson	Liberal
Chelsea	Sir Samuel Hoare, Bt	Conservative
Cheltenham	Sir James Agg-Gardner	Conservative
Chertsey	Philip Richardson	Conservative
Chester	Sir Charles Cayzer, Bt	Conservative
Chesterfield	Barnet Kenyon	Liberal
Chester-le-Street	Jack Lawson	Labour
Chichester	Charles Rudkin	Liberal
Chippenham	Alfred Bonwick	Liberal
Chislehurst	Robert Nesbitt	Conservative
Chorley	Douglas Hacking	Conservative
Cirencester and Tewkesbury	Sir Thomas Davies	Conservative
City of London (Two members)	Sir Frederick Banbury, Bt	Conservative
City of London (Two members)	Edward Grenfell	Conservative
Clackmannan and Eastern Stirlingshire	MacNeill Weir	Labour
Clapham	Sir John Leigh, Bt	Conservative
Clay Cross	Charles Duncan	Labour
Cleveland	Sir Charles Starmer	Liberal
Clitheroe	Sir William Brass	Conservative
Coatbridge	James C. Welsh	Labour
Colchester	Sir Laming Worthington-Evans, Bt	Conservative
Colne Valley	Philip Snowden	Labour
Combined English Universities (Two members)	Sir Martin Conway	Conservative
Combined English Universities (Two members)	H. A. L. Fisher	Liberal
Combined Scottish Universities (Three members)	Sir Henry Craik	Conservative
Combined Scottish Universities (Three members)	Dugald Cowan	Liberal
Combined Scottish Universities (Three members)	Sir George Berry	Conservative
Consett	Herbert Dunnico	Labour
Cornwall North	Sir George Marks	Liberal
Coventry	A. A. Purcell	Labour
Crewe	Edward Hemmerde	Labour
Croydon North	Glyn Mason	Conservative
Croydon South	Sir William Mitchell-Thomson, Bt	Conservative
Cumberland North	Hon. Donald Howard	Conservative
== D ==
Darlington	William Edwin Pease	Conservative
Dartford	John Edmund Mills	Labour
Darwen	Frederick Hindle	Liberal
Daventry	Hon. Edward FitzRoy	Conservative
Denbigh	Ellis Davies	Liberal
Deptford	C. W. Bowerman	Labour
Derby (Two members)	J. H. Thomas	Labour
Derby (Two members)	William Raynes	Labour
Derbyshire North-East	Frank Lee	Labour
Derbyshire South	Henry Lorimer	Conservative
Derbyshire West	The Marquess of Hartington	Conservative
Devizes	Eric Macfadyen	Liberal
Dewsbury	Edmund Harvey	Liberal
Doncaster	Wilfred Paling	Labour
Don Valley	Thomas Williams	Labour
Dorset East	Gordon Hall Caine	Conservative
Dorset North	John Emlyn-Jones	Liberal
Dorset South	Robert Yerburgh	Conservative
Dorset West	Philip Colfox	Conservative
Dover	Hon. John Astor	Conservative
Down (Two members)	David Reid	Ulster Unionist
Down (Two members)	John Simms	Ulster Unionist
Dudley	Cyril Lloyd	Conservative
Dulwich	Sir Frederick Hall, Bt	Conservative
Dumbarton Burghs	David Kirkwood	Labour
Dumfriesshire	William Chapple	Liberal
Dunbartonshire	William Martin	Labour
Dundee (Two members)	E. D. Morel	Labour
Dundee (Two members)	Edwin Scrymgeour	Scottish Prohibition
Dunfermline Burghs	William McLean Watson	Labour
Durham	Joshua Ritson	Labour
== E ==
Ealing	Sir Herbert Nield	Conservative
Eastbourne	Rupert Gwynne	Conservative
East Grinstead	Henry Cautley	Conservative
East Ham North	Susan Lawrence	Labour
East Ham South	Alfred Barnes	Co-operative
Ebbw Vale	Evan Davies	Labour
Eccles	John Buckle	Labour
Eddisbury	Harry Barnston	Conservative
Edinburgh Central	William Graham	Labour
Edinburgh East	James Hogge	Liberal
Edinburgh North	Peter Raffan	Liberal
Edinburgh South	Sir Samuel Chapman	Conservative
Edinburgh West	Vivian Phillipps	Liberal
Edmonton	Frank Broad	Labour
Elland	Sir Robert Kay	Liberal
Enfield	William Henderson	Labour
Epping	Leonard Lyle	Conservative
Epsom	Rowland Blades	Conservative
Essex South East	Philip Hoffman	Labour
Evesham	Bolton Eyres-Monsell	Conservative
Exeter	Robert Newman	Conservative
Eye	The Lord Huntingfield	Conservative
== F ==
Fareham	Sir John Davidson	Conservative
Farnham	Arthur Samuel	Conservative
Farnworth	Thomas Greenall	Labour
Faversham	Granville Wheler	Conservative
Fermanagh and Tyrone (Two members)	Thomas Harbison	Irish Nationalist
Fermanagh and Tyrone (Two members)	Cahir Healy	Irish Nationalist
Fife East	James Millar	Liberal
Fife West	William Adamson	Labour
Finchley	Atholl Robertson	Liberal
Finsbury	George Gillett	Labour
Flintshire	Thomas Parry	Liberal
Forest of Dean	James Wignall	Labour
Forfarshire	James Falconer	Liberal
Frome	Frederick Gould	Labour
Fulham East	Kenyon Vaughan-Morgan	Conservative
Fulham West	Cyril Cobb	Conservative
Fylde	Edward Stanley	Conservative
== G ==
Gainsborough	Sir Richard Winfrey	Liberal
Galloway	Cecil Dudgeon	Liberal
Gateshead	John Dickie	Liberal
Gillingham	Gerald Hohler	Conservative
Glasgow Bridgeton	James Maxton	Labour
Glasgow Camlachie	Campbell Stephen	Labour
Glasgow Cathcart	Robert Macdonald	Conservative
Glasgow Central	Sir William Alexander	Conservative
Glasgow Gorbals	George Buchanan	Labour
Glasgow Govan	Neil Maclean	Labour
Glasgow Hillhead	Sir Robert Horne	Conservative
Glasgow Kelvingrove	William Hutchison	Conservative
Glasgow Maryhill	John Muir	Labour
Glasgow Partick	Andrew Young	Co-operative
Glasgow Pollok	Sir John Gilmour, Bt	Conservative
Glasgow St. Rollox	James Stewart	Labour
Glasgow Shettleston	John Wheatley	Labour
Glasgow Springburn	George Hardie	Labour
Glasgow Tradeston	Thomas Henderson	Co-operative
Gloucester	James Horlick	Conservative
Gower	David Grenfell	Labour
Grantham	Sir Victor Warrender, Bt	Conservative
Gravesend	George Isaacs	Labour
Great Yarmouth	Sir Arthur Harbord	Liberal
Greenock	Sir Godfrey Collins	Liberal
Greenwich	Edward Timothy Palmer	Labour
Grimsby	Tom Sutcliffe	Conservative
Guildford	Henry Buckingham	Conservative
== H ==
Hackney Central	Leonard Franklin	Liberal
Hackney North	John Harris	Liberal
Hackney South	Herbert Morrison	Labour
Halifax	John Henry Whitley	Liberal
Hamilton	Duncan Graham	Labour
Hammersmith North	James Patrick Gardner	Labour
Hammersmith South	Sir William Bull	Conservative
Hampstead	George Balfour	Conservative
Hanley	Harper Parker	Labour
Harborough	John Wycliffe Black	Liberal
Harrow	Oswald Mosley	Independent
The Hartlepools	William Jowitt	Liberal
Harwich	Albert Hillary	Liberal
Hastings	Eustace Percy	Conservative
Hemel Hempstead	John Freeman Dunn	Liberal
Hemsworth	John Guest	Labour
Hendon	Philip Lloyd-Graeme	Conservative
Henley	Reginald Terrell	Conservative
Hereford	Sir Samuel Roberts	Conservative
Hertford	Sir Murray Sueter	Conservative
Hexham	Victor Finney	Liberal
Heywood and Radcliffe	Abraham England	Liberal
High Peak	Sir Samuel Hill-Wood	Conservative
Hitchin	Guy Kindersley	Conservative
Holborn	James Remnant	Conservative
Holderness	Sir Samuel Savery	Conservative
Holland-with-Boston	William Royce	Labour
Honiton	Sir Clive Morrison-Bell	Conservative
Horncastle	Samuel Pattinson	Liberal
Hornsey	Viscount Ednam	Conservative
Horsham and Worthing	The Earl Winterton	Conservative
Houghton-le-Spring	Robert Richardson	Labour
Howdenshire	Hon. Stanley Jackson	Conservative
Huddersfield	James Hudson	Labour
Huntingdonshire	Leonard Costello	Liberal
Hythe	Philip Sassoon	Conservative
== I ==
Ilford	Fredric Wise	Conservative
Ilkeston	George Oliver	Labour
Ince	Stephen Walsh	Labour
Inverness-shire	Sir Murdoch Macdonald	Liberal
Ipswich	Robert Jackson	Labour
Isle of Ely	Henry Mond	Liberal
Isle of Thanet	Hon. Esmond Harmsworth	Conservative
Isle of Wight	J. E. B. Seely	Liberal
Islington East	Arthur Comyns Carr	Liberal
Islington North	Sir Henry Cowan	Conservative
Islington South	William Cluse	Labour
Islington West	Frederick Montague	Labour
== J ==
Jarrow	Robert John Wilson	Labour
== K ==
Keighley	Robert Pilkington	Liberal
Kennington	Thomas Williams	Labour
Kensington North	Percy Gates	Conservative
Kensington South	Sir William Davison	Conservative
Kettering	Samuel Perry	Co-operative
Kidderminster	John Wardlaw-Milne	Conservative
Kilmarnock	Robert Climie	Labour
King's Lynn	Graham Woodwark	Liberal
Kingston upon Hull Central	Hon. Joseph Kenworthy	Liberal
Kingston upon Hull East	Roger Lumley	Conservative
Kingston upon Hull North West	Lambert Ward	Conservative
Kingston upon Hull South West	Cyril Entwistle	Liberal
Kingston-upon-Thames	George Penny	Conservative
Kingswinford	Charles Sitch	Labour
Kinross & West Perthshire	The Duchess of Atholl	Conservative
Kirkcaldy District of Burghs	Tom Kennedy	Labour
Knutsford	Ernest Makins	Conservative
== L ==
Lambeth North	Frank Briant	Liberal
Lanark	Thomas Dickson	Labour
Lanarkshire North	Joseph Sullivan	Labour
Lancaster	John Joseph O'Neill	Liberal
Leeds Central	Sir Charles Wilson	Conservative
Leeds North	Sir Gervase Beckett	Conservative
Leeds North East	John Birchall	Conservative
Leeds South	Henry Charleton	Labour
Leeds South East	James O'Grady	Labour
Leeds West	Thomas Stamford	Labour
Leek	William Bromfield	Labour
Leicester East	George Banton	Labour
Leicester South	Ronald Wilberforce Allen	Liberal
Leicester West	Frederick Pethick-Lawrence	Labour
Leigh	Joe Tinker	Labour
Leith	William Wedgwood Benn	Liberal
Leominster	Ernest Shepperson	Conservative
Lewes	William Campion	Conservative
Lewisham East	Assheton Pownall	Conservative
Lewisham West	Sir Philip Dawson	Conservative
Leyton East	Archibald Church	Labour
Leyton West	James Cassels	Conservative
Lichfield	Frank Hodges	Labour
Lincoln	Alfred Davies	Conservative
Linlithgow	Manny Shinwell	Labour
Liverpool East Toxteth	James Stuart Rankin	Conservative
Liverpool Edge Hill	Jack Hayes	Labour
Liverpool Everton	John Harmood-Banner	Conservative
Liverpool Exchange	Sir Leslie Scott	Conservative
Liverpool Fairfield	Jack Cohen	Conservative
Liverpool Kirkdale	De Fonblanque Pennefather	Conservative
Liverpool Scotland	T. P. O'Connor	Irish Nationalist
Liverpool Walton	Sir Warden Chilcott	Conservative
Liverpool Wavertree	Hugh Rathbone	Liberal
Liverpool West Derby	Sydney Jones	Liberal
Liverpool West Toxteth	Sir Robert Houston	Conservative
Llandaff and Barry	William Cope	Conservative
Llanelli	John Henry Williams	Labour
Londonderry	Sir Malcolm Macnaghten	Ulster Unionist
London University	Sir Sydney Russell-Wells	Conservative
Lonsdale	Henry Maden	Liberal
Loughborough	Louis Spears	Liberal
Louth	Margaret Wintringham	Liberal
Lowestoft	Sir Gervais Rentoul	Conservative
Ludlow	George Windsor-Clive	Conservative
Luton	Hon. Geoffrey Howard	Liberal
== M ==
Macclesfield	John Remer	Conservative
Maidstone	Carlyon Bellairs	Conservative
Maldon	Valentine Crittall	Labour
Manchester Ardwick	Thomas Lowth	Labour
Manchester Blackley	Philip Oliver	Liberal
Manchester Clayton	John Edward Sutton	Labour
Manchester Exchange	Robert Noton Barclay	Liberal
Manchester Gorton	Joseph Compton	Labour
Manchester Hulme	Joseph Nall	Conservative
Manchester Platting	J. R. Clynes	Labour
Manchester Moss Side	Thomas Ackroyd	Liberal
Manchester Rusholme	Charles Masterman	Liberal
Manchester Withington	Ernest Simon	Liberal
Mansfield	Frank Varley	Labour
Melton	Sir Charles Yate, Bt	Conservative
Merioneth	Henry Haydn Jones	Liberal
Merthyr	R. C. Wallhead	Labour
Middlesbrough East	Penry Williams	Liberal
Middlesbrough West	Trevelyan Thomson	Liberal
Middleton and Prestwich	Nairne Stewart Sandeman	Conservative
Midlothian North	Andrew Clarke	Labour
Midlothian South and Peebles	Joseph Westwood	Labour
Mitcham	Sir Richard Meller	Conservative
Monmouth	Leolin Forestier-Walker	Conservative
Montgomeryshire	David Davies	Liberal
Montrose Burghs	John Sturrock	Liberal
Moray & Nairn	Hon. James Stuart	Conservative
Morpeth	Robert Smillie	Labour
Mossley	Austin Hopkinson	Independent
Motherwell	Hugh Ferguson	Conservative
== N ==
Neath	William Jenkins	Labour
Nelson and Colne	Arthur Greenwood	Labour
Newark	The Marquess of Titchfield	Conservative
Newbury	Harold Stranger	Liberal
Newcastle-under-Lyme	Josiah Wedgwood	Labour
Newcastle-upon-Tyne Central	Charles Trevelyan	Labour
Newcastle-upon-Tyne East	Sir Robert Aske	Liberal
Newcastle-upon-Tyne North	Nicholas Grattan-Doyle	Conservative
Newcastle-upon-Tyne West	Cecil Ramage	Liberal
New Forest and Christchurch	Wilfrid Ashley	Conservative
Newport	Reginald Clarry	Conservative
Newton	Robert Young	Labour
Norfolk East	Sir Hugh Seely	Liberal
Norfolk North	Noel Buxton	Labour
Norfolk South	George Edwards	Labour
Norfolk South West	Alan McLean	Conservative
Normanton	Frederick Hall	Labour
Northampton	Margaret Bondfield	Labour
Northwich	Lord Colum Crichton-Stuart	Conservative
Norwich (Two members)	Dorothy Jewson	Labour
Norwich (Two members)	Walter Smith	Labour
Norwood	Walter Greaves-Lord	Conservative
Nottingham Central	Reginald Berkeley	Liberal
Nottingham East	Norman Birkett	Liberal
Nottingham South	Lord Henry Cavendish-Bentinck	Conservative
Nottingham West	Arthur Hayday	Labour
Nuneaton	Herbert Willison	Liberal
== O ==
Ogmore	Vernon Hartshorn	Labour
Oldham (Two members)	Sir Edward Grigg	Liberal
Oldham (Two members)	William John Tout	Labour
Orkney and Shetland	Sir Robert Hamilton	Liberal
Ormskirk	Francis Blundell	Conservative
Oswestry	William Bridgeman	Conservative
Oxford	Frank Gray	Liberal
Oxford University (Two members)	Lord Hugh Cecil	Conservative
Oxford University (Two members)	Sir Charles Oman	Conservative
== P ==
Paddington North	William Perring	Conservative
Paddington South	Douglas King	Conservative
Paisley	H. H. Asquith	Liberal
Peckham	Collingwood Hughes	Conservative
Pembrokeshire	Gwilym Lloyd George	Liberal
Penistone	William Pringle	Liberal
Penrith and Cockermouth	Arthur Dixey	Conservative
Penryn and Falmouth	Sir Courtenay Mansel, Bt	Liberal
Perth	Robert Macgregor Mitchell	Liberal
Peterborough	Sir Henry Brassey, Bt	Conservative
Petersfield	William Graham Nicholson	Conservative
Plymouth Devonport	Leslie Hore-Belisha	Liberal
Plymouth Drake	Sir Arthur Benn	Conservative
Plymouth Sutton	Nancy Astor	Conservative
Pontefract	Tom Smith	Labour
Pontypool	Thomas Griffiths	Labour
Pontypridd	Thomas Mardy Jones	Labour
Poplar South	Samuel March	Labour
Portsmouth Central	Sir Thomas Bramsdon	Liberal
Portsmouth North	Sir Bertram Falle, Bt	Conservative
Portsmouth South	Sir Herbert Cayzer	Conservative
Preston (Two members)	James Hodge	Liberal
Preston (Two members)	Tom Shaw	Labour
Pudsey and Otley	Sir Francis Watson	Conservative
Putney	Samuel Samuel	Conservative
== Q ==
Queen's University of Belfast	Thomas Sinclair	Ulster Unionist
== R ==
Reading	Somerville Hastings	Labour
Reigate	George Cockerill	Conservative
Renfrewshire, East	Robert Nichol	Labour
Renfrewshire, West	Robert Murray	Labour
Rhondda East	David Watts-Morgan	Labour
Rhondda West	William John	Labour
Richmond (Yorkshire)	Murrough Wilson	Conservative
Richmond upon Thames	Harry Becker	Conservative
Ripon	Hon. Edward Wood	Conservative
Rochdale	Ramsay Muir	Liberal
Romford	Charles Rhys	Conservative
Ross and Cromarty	Ian Macpherson	Liberal
Rossendale	Robert Waddington	Conservative
Rotherham	Fred Lindley	Labour
Rotherhithe	Ben Smith	Labour
Rother Valley	Thomas Walter Grundy	Labour
Rothwell	William Lunn	Labour
Roxburgh and Selkirk	The Earl of Dalkeith	Conservative
Royton	William Gorman	Liberal
Rugby	Ernest Brown	Liberal
Rushcliffe	Henry Betterton	Conservative
Rutland and Stamford	Neville Smith-Carington	Conservative
Rutherglen	William Wright	Labour
Rye	George Courthope	Conservative
== S ==
Saffron Walden	William Foot Mitchell	Conservative
St Albans	Sir Francis Fremantle	Conservative
St Helens	Sir James Sexton	Labour
St Ives	Sir Clifford Cory, Bt	Liberal
St Marylebone	Sir Douglas Hogg	Conservative
St Pancras North	James Marley	Labour
St Pancras South East	Herbert Romeril	Labour
St Pancras South West	Richard Barnett	Conservative
Salford North	Ben Tillett	Labour
Salford South	Joseph Toole	Labour
Salford West	Alexander Haycock	Labour
Salisbury	Hugh Moulton	Liberal
Scarborough and Whitby	Sidney Herbert	Conservative
Seaham	Sidney Webb	Labour
Sedgefield	Leonard Ropner	Conservative
Sevenoaks	Ronald Williams	Liberal
Sheffield Attercliffe	Cecil Wilson	Labour
Sheffield, Brightside	Arthur Ponsonby	Labour
Sheffield, Central	James Hope	Conservative
Sheffield, Ecclesall	Albert Harland	Conservative
Sheffield, Hallam	Sir Frederick Sykes	Conservative
Sheffield, Hillsborough	A. V. Alexander	Co-operative
Sheffield, Park	Richard Storry Deans	Conservative
Shipley	William Mackinder	Labour
Shoreditch	Ernest Thurtle	Labour
Shrewsbury	Joseph Sunlight	Liberal
Skipton	Richard Roundell	Conservative
Smethwick	John Davison	Labour
Southampton (Two members)	Edwin Perkins	Conservative
Southampton (Two members)	Lord Apsley	Conservative
Southend-on-Sea	Viscount Elveden	Conservative
Southport	Sir John Brunner, Bt	Liberal
South Molton	George Lambert	Liberal
South Shields	Edward Harney	Liberal
Southwark Central	James Daniel Gilbert	Liberal
Southwark North	Leslie Haden-Guest	Labour
Southwark South East	Thomas Naylor	Labour
Sowerby	Arnold Williams	Liberal
Spelthorne	Philip Pilditch	Conservative
Spennymoor	Joseph Batey	Labour
Spen Valley	Sir John Simon	Liberal
Stafford	Hon. William Ormsby-Gore	Conservative
Stalybridge and Hyde	J. Lincoln Tattersall	Liberal
Stepney Limehouse	Clement Attlee	Labour
Stepney Mile End	John Scurr	Labour
Stirling and Falkirk Burghs	Sir George McCrae	Liberal
Stirlingshire West	Thomas Johnston	Labour
Stockport (Two members)	William Greenwood	Conservative
Stockport (Two members)	Charles Royle	Liberal
Stockton on Tees	Robert Strother Stewart	Liberal
Stoke Newington	Ernest Spero	Liberal
Stoke-on-Trent	John Ward	Liberal
Stone	Joseph Lamb	Conservative
Stourbridge	Douglas Pielou	Conservative
Streatham	William Lane-Mitchell	Conservative
Stretford	Sir Thomas Robinson	Liberal
Stroud	Hon. Freddie Guest	Liberal
Sudbury	Frederick Loverseed	Liberal
Sunderland (Two members)	Walter Raine	Conservative
Sunderland (Two members)	Luke Thompson	Conservative
Surrey East	James Galbraith	Conservative
Swansea East	David Williams	Labour
Swansea West	Howel Samuel	Labour
Swindon	Sir Reginald Banks	Conservative
== T ==
Tamworth	Sir Edward Iliffe	Conservative
Taunton	John Hope Simpson	Liberal
Tavistock	Maxwell Thornton	Liberal
Thirsk and Malton	Edmund Turton	Conservative
Thornbury	Athelstan Rendall	Liberal
Tiverton	Francis Dyke Acland	Liberal
Tonbridge	Herbert Spender-Clay	Conservative
Torquay	P. Gilchrist Thompson	Liberal
Totnes	Henry Vivian	Liberal
Tottenham North	Robert Morrison	Co-operative
Tottenham South	Percy Alden	Labour
Twickenham	Sir William Joynson-Hicks, Bt	Conservative
Tynemouth	Sir Alexander Russell	Conservative
== U ==
University of Wales	George M. Ll. Davies	Christian Pacifist
Uxbridge	Dennistoun Burney	Conservative
== W ==
Wakefield	George Sherwood	Labour
Wallasey	Sir Robert Burton-Chadwick	Conservative
Wallsend	Patrick Hastings	Labour
Walsall	Pat Collins	Liberal
Walthamstow East	Sir Stanley Johnson	Conservative
Walthamstow West	Valentine McEntee	Labour
Wansbeck	George Warne	Labour
Warrington	Charles Dukes	Labour
Warwick and Leamington	Anthony Eden	Conservative
Watford	Dennis Herbert	Conservative
Wandsworth Central	Sir John Norton-Griffiths, Bt	Conservative
Waterloo	Malcolm Bullock	Conservative
Wednesbury	Alfred Short	Labour
Wellingborough	William Cove	Labour
Wells	Arthur Hobhouse	Liberal
Wentworth	George Harry Hirst	Labour
West Bromwich	Frederick Roberts	Labour
Westbury	Charles Darbishire	Liberal
Western Isles	Alexander Livingstone	Liberal
West Ham Plaistow	Will Thorne	Labour
West Ham Silvertown	Jack Jones	Labour
West Ham Stratford	Thomas Groves	Labour
West Ham Upton	Benjamin Gardner	Labour
Westhoughton	Rhys Davies	Labour
Westminster Abbey	John Sanctuary Nicholson	Conservative
Westminster St George's	James Erskine	Conservative
Westmorland	John Weston	Conservative
Weston-super-Mare	Frank Murrell	Liberal
Whitechapel and St Georges	Harry Gosling	Labour
Whitehaven	Thomas Gavan-Duffy	Labour
Widnes	Christopher Clayton	Conservative
Wigan	John Parkinson	Labour
Willesden East	Harcourt Johnstone	Liberal
Willesden West	Samuel Viant	Labour
Wimbledon	Sir Joseph Hood, Bt	Conservative
Winchester	George Hennessy	Conservative
Windsor	Sir Annesley Somerville	Conservative
Wirral	Stephen Roxby Dodds	Liberal
Wolverhampton Bilston	Charles Howard-Bury	Conservative
Wolverhampton East	George Thorne	Liberal
Wolverhampton West	Robert Bird	Conservative
Woodbridge	Sir Arthur Churchman, Bt	Conservative
Wood Green	Godfrey Locker-Lampson	Conservative
Woolwich East	Harry Snell	Labour
Woolwich West	Sir Kingsley Wood	Conservative
Worcester	Crawford Greene	Conservative
Workington	Thomas Cape	Labour
The Wrekin	Henry Nixon	Labour
Wrexham	Robert Richards	Labour
Wycombe	Lady Terrington	Liberal
== Y ==
Yeovil	George Davies	Conservative
York	John Marriott	Conservative

== By elections ==
See the list of United Kingdom by-elections.

== Lists by region ==
- List of MPs for constituencies in Wales (1923–1924)

== See also ==
- UK general election, 1923
- List of parliaments of the United Kingdom
