= 1907 Anglesey by-election =

UK parliamentary by-election

The 1907 Anglesey by-election was a parliamentary by-election held for the UK House of Commons constituency of Anglesey in North Wales on 21 August 1907.

== Vacancy ==
Under the provisions of the Succession to the Crown Act 1707 and a number of subsequent Acts, MPs appointed to certain ministerial and legal offices were at this time required to seek re-election. The Anglesey by-election was caused by the appointment of the sitting Liberal MP, Ellis Griffith as Recorder of Birkenhead.

== Candidates ==
Ellis Griffith was nominated for the seat again. It was reported that the Conservatives were not expected to oppose his re-election. There was not yet any tradition of candidates from organised labour contesting elections in this part of the country and no nominations were put forward against Griffith who was therefore returned unopposed.

== Result ==
Anglesey by-election, 1907
Party	Candidate	Votes	%	±%
Liberal	Ellis Griffith	Unopposed		
Registered electors				
Liberal hold				

== See also ==
- 1837 Anglesey by-election
- 1923 Anglesey by-election
- List of United Kingdom by-elections
- United Kingdom by-election records
