= Thomas Lewis (Welsh politician) =

Thomas Lewis (1821 – 2 December 1897) was a Welsh Liberal Party politician. He was the Member of Parliament (MP) for Anglesey 12 July 1886 – 19 July 1895.

Parliament of the United Kingdom
Preceded by Richard Davies	Member of Parliament for Anglesey; 1886 – 1895	Succeeded by Sir Ellis Ellis-Griffith, Bt
