= 1837 Anglesey by-election =

UK parliamentary by-election

← 1835	23 February 1837	1837 →

The Anglesey seat in the House of Commons. Elected by simple majority using first past the post. Triggered by resignation of incumbent
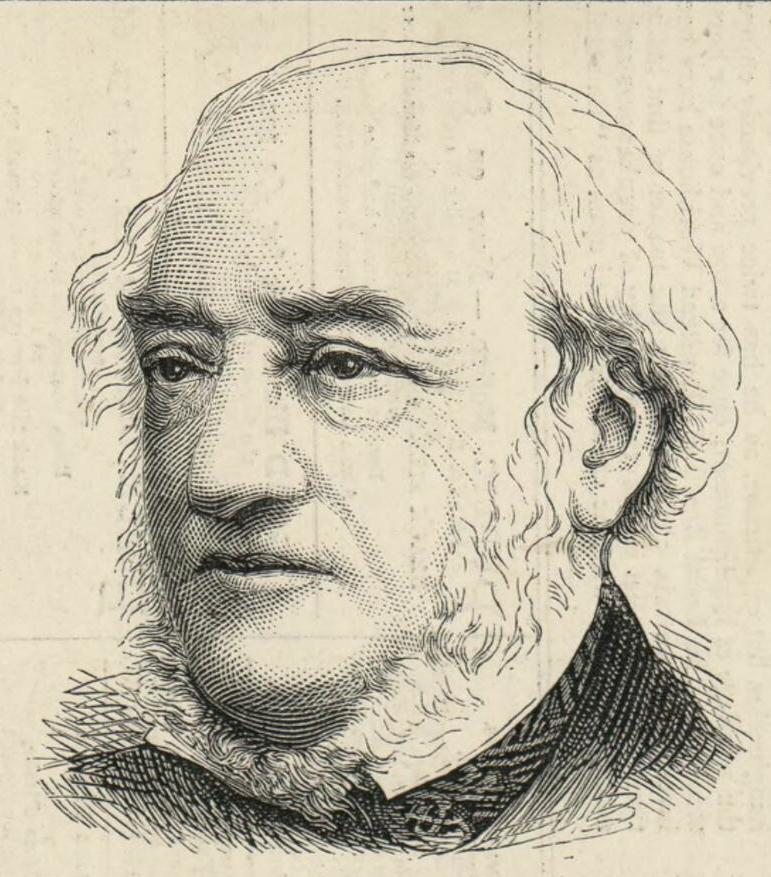
		Con
Candidate	William Owen Stanley	Owen John Augustus Fuller Meyrick
Party	Whig	Conservative
Popular vote	693	586
Percentage	54.2%	45.8%
MP before election
Richard Williams-Bulkeley
Whig
Subsequent MP
William Owen Stanley
Whig

The 1837 Anglesey by-election was a parliamentary by-election held for the UK House of Commons constituency of Anglesey in North Wales on 23 February 1837.

== Vacancy ==
The by-election was called following the resignation of the sitting member Richard Williams-Bulkeley.

== Candidates ==
The Whigs nominated solicitor William Owen Stanley who was the son of John Stanley, 1st Baron Stanley of Alderley and the younger twin brother of Edward Stanley, 2nd Baron Stanley of Alderley.

The Conservatives nominated Owen John Augustus Fuller Meyrick.

== Result ==
1837 Anglesey by-election
Party	Candidate	Votes	%	±%
Whig	William Owen Stanley	693	54.2	N/A
Conservative	Owen John Augustus Fuller Meyrick	586	45.8	N/A
Majority		107	8.4	N/A
Turnout		1,279	88.2	N/A
Registered electors		1,450		
Whig hold				

== See also ==
- 1907 Anglesey by-election
- 1923 Anglesey by-election
- List of United Kingdom by-elections
