= 1923 United Kingdom general election in Scotland =

1923 United Kingdom general election

- 6 December 1923

All 74 Scottish seats to the House of Commons
- Turnout: 67.9% (▼2.5 pp)
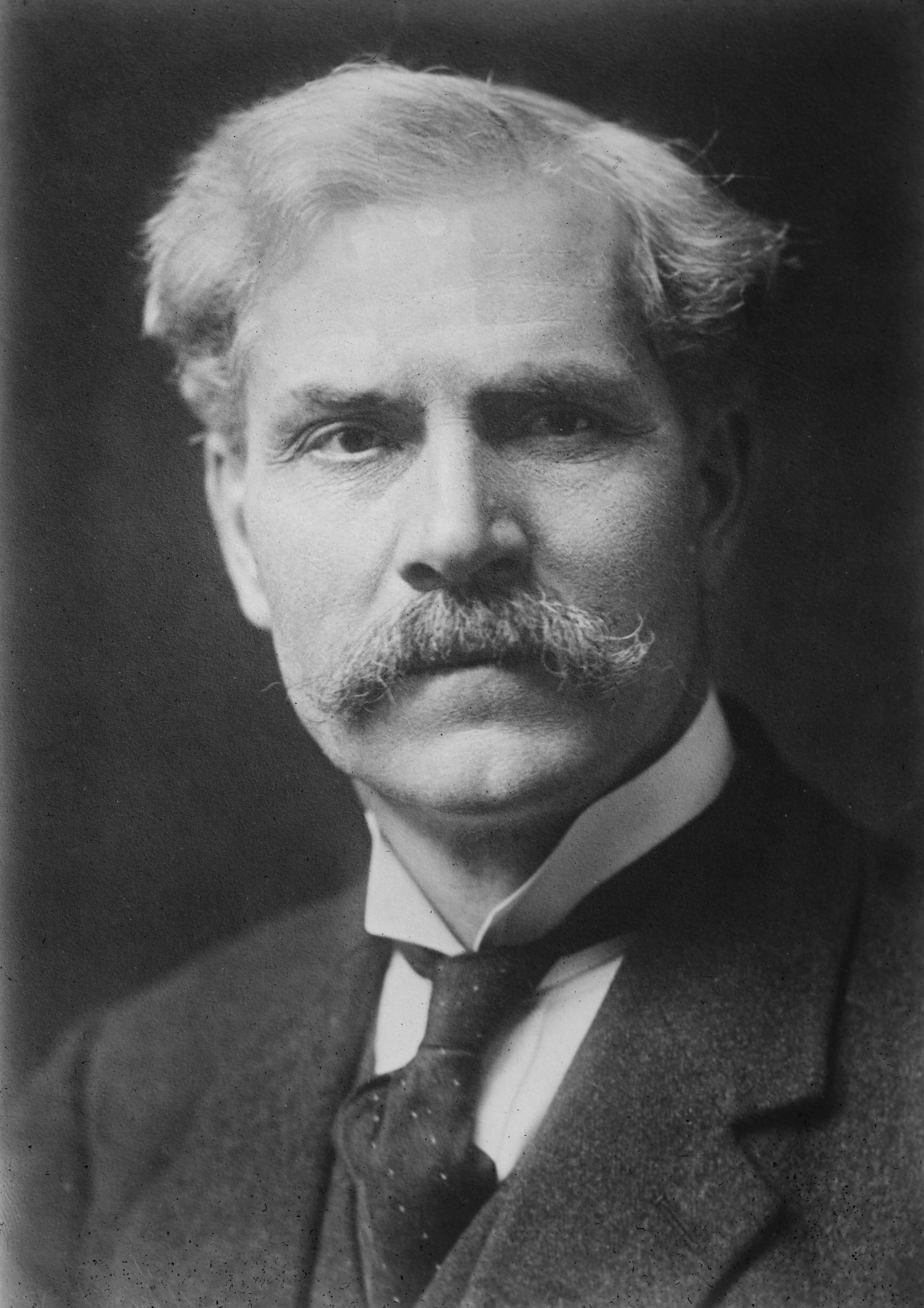

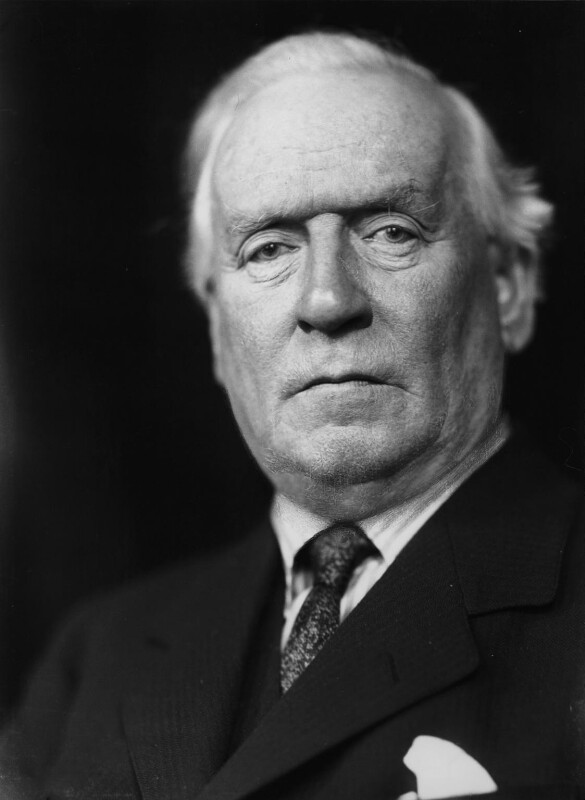

	First party	Second party	Third party
Leader	Ramsay MacDonald	H. H. Asquith	Stanley Baldwin
Party	Labour	Liberal	Unionist
Alliance		Liberal	Conservative
Leader's seat	Seaham	Paisley	Bewdley
Last election	29 seats, (Note: Combined results for burgh, county and university seats) 32.2%	28 seats, (Note: Liberal total and change in compared to the combined Liberal and National Liberal total in 1922) 39.2%	15 seats, 25.1%
Seats won	34	23	16
Seat change	▲5	▼5	▲1
Popular vote	532,450 (Note: Total and percentage votes given here are for territorial constituencies only)	422,995	468,526
Percentage	35.9%	28.4%	31.6%
Swing	▲3.7 pp	▼10.8 pp	▲6.5 pp
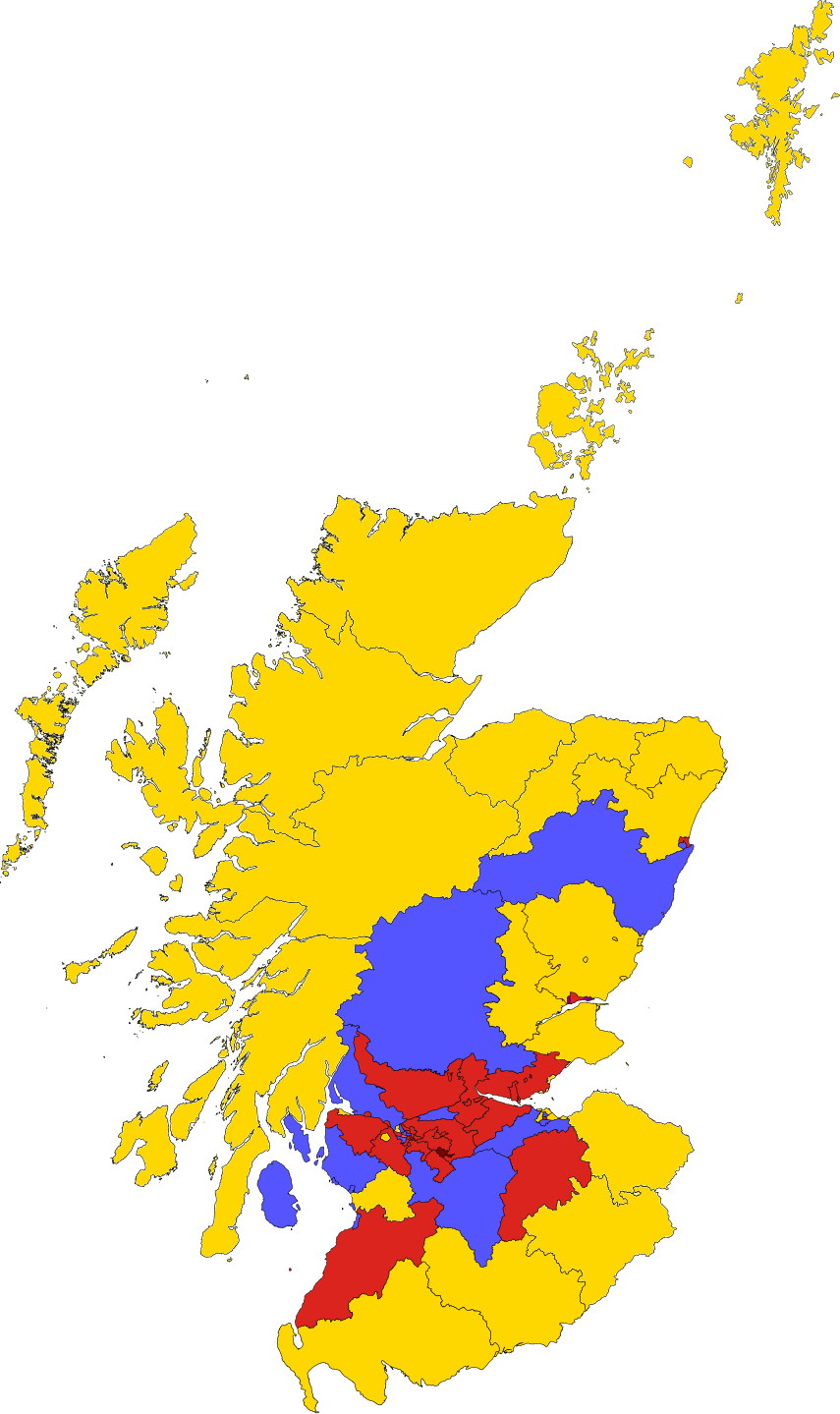

On Thursday 6 December 1923, the 1923 United Kingdom general election was held in Scotland, to elect all 615 members of the House of Commons, with 74 seats being in Scotland. 71 seats (32 burgh constituencies and 38 county constituencies) (Note: One burgh seat, Dundee, was represented by two members of parliament.) represented territorial constituencies. There was also one university constituency, which elected an additional 3 members using the Single Transferable Vote (STV) method.

The election led to an overall drop in seats for the Conservative Party, with the Liberal Party and Labour taking seats across the United Kingdom. The election saw the formation of the first Labour Government under Prime Minister Ramsay MacDonald, with the support of the reunited Liberal Party under H. H. Asquith; however, the Labour Government would only survive a year, owing to a vote of confidence the following year.

== Candidates ==
Below is a table summarising the candidates of the 1923 general election in Scotland, excluding those in the Combined Scottish Universities constituency.

Affiliation	Candidates
Scottish Liberal Party	59
Unionist Party	52
Labour Party	45
Communist Party of Great Britain	4 (Note: The candidates that stood were Willie Gallacher in Dundee, Aitken Ferguson in Glasgow Kelvingrove, Alec Geddes in Greenock and Walton Newbold in Motherwell.)
Co-operative Party	3 (Note: The candidates that stood were Andrew Young in Glasgow Partick, Tom Henderson in Glasgow Tradeston and John Biggar in Paisley.)
Independent Labour	2 (Note: Candidate D. D. Cormack stood in Paisley and Candidate Hugh McCowan stood in Western Isles.)
Scottish Prohibition Party	1 (Note: Leader Edwin Scrymgeour stood in Dundee.)
Miners' Reform Union	1 (Note: Candidate Philip Hodge stood in West Fife.)
Total	167

== Analysis ==
The election saw the Labour Party make further gains following their success in the previous election in 1922, winning 34 seats in total. Labour won Kirkcaldy Burghs, Glasgow Partick, Kilmarnock and Berwick and Haddington from the Liberals, though lost Stirling and Falkirk to the Liberals. The Co-operative party, under the Labour Party Whip, won Glasgow Patrick with candidate Andrew Young. It retained its other seat in Glasgow Tradeston.

The Liberals, who had reunited following the split caused by the continuation of the Wartime coalition, came in second on 23 seats, down five from the previous combined total for their two former factions.

The Unionists gained a seat overall, finishing third on 16 seats. The party lost Perth and Edinburgh North to the Liberals, and Dunbartonshire, Lanark and Midlothian and Peebles Northern to the Labour Party. However, the Unionist Party won Motherwell from the Communist Party of Great Britain, Glasgow Cathcart from the Labour Party, and West Aberdeenshire and Kincardine, Moray and Nairn and Kinross and Western Perthshire from the reunited Liberal Party.

Although Labour won a plurality of seats in Scotland, when combined with results from across the UK, the Conservatives (with whom the Unionists aligned at Westminster) led by Prime Minister Stanley Baldwin, won a plurality in the House of Commons. The conservatives were however, well short of majority, with both Labour, led by Ramsay MacDonald, and H. H. Asquith's reunited Liberal Party gaining enough seats to produce a hung parliament. MacDonald formed the first Labour government with tacit support from the Liberals. Rather than trying to bring the Liberals back into government, Asquith's motivation for permitting Labour to enter power was that he hoped they would prove to be incompetent and quickly lose support. Being a minority, MacDonald's government only lasted ten months and another general election was held in October 1924.

The Scottish Prohibition Party retained its only seat in Dundee.

== Seat summary ==
Below is a table summarising the total number of seats, gains and losses for each party in both the territorial county and burgh constituencies and the Combined Scottish Universities constituency.

Party	Seats				
Party	Total	Gains	Losses	Net	Of total (%)
Labour (Total)	34	7	2	▲5	45.9
Labour	32	6	2	▲4	43.2
Co-operative Party	2	1	0	▲1	2.8
Liberal	23	3	8	▼5	31.1
Unionist	16	6	5	▲1	21.6
Scottish Prohibition	1	0	0	Steady	1.4
Communist	0	0	1	▼1	—
Total	74				

== County and burgh constituency results ==
Below is a table summarising the constituency results of the 1923 general election in Scotland, excluding the result in the Combined Scottish Universities constituency.

Party	Seats					Aggregate votes		
Party	Total	Gains	Losses	Net	Of total (%)	Total	Of total (%) (Note: Adjusted for multi-member constituencies.)	Change (%)
Labour (Total)	34	7	2	▲5	47.9	532,450	35.9	▲3.7
Labour	32	6	2	▲4	45.1	503,289	34.0	▲3.6
Co-operative Party	2	1	0	▲1	2.8	29,161	1.9	▲0.1
Liberal	22	3	8	▼5	31.0	422,995	28.4	▼10.8
Unionist	14	6	5	▲1	19.7	468,526	31.6	▲6.5
Communist	0	0	1 (Note: Walton Newbold in Motherwell.)	▼1	—	39,448	2.4	▲1.0
Scottish Prohibition	1 (Note: Edwin Scrymgeour in Dundee.)	0	0	Steady	1.4	25,753	0.9	▼0.1
Independent Labour	0	Did not stand in 1922			—	5,696	0.4	—N/a
Miners' Reform Union	0	Did not stand in 1922			—	6,459	0.4	—N/a
Total	71			0	100.0	1,501,327	100.0	0.0
Registered voters, and turnout						2,145,326 (Note: Electorate in contested constituencies. The total electorate was 2,250,826.)	67.9	▼2.5

Popular vote
Labour	35.9%
Unionist	31.6%
Liberal	28.4%
Other	4.1%

Parliamentary seats
Labour	47.3%
Liberal	31.1%
Unionist	21.6%
Prohibition	1.4%

== Combined Scottish Universities result ==
The Combined Scottish Universities elected an additional 3 members to the house using the STV voting method. Note that there was no election as only three candidates stood for election.

General election 1923: Combined Scottish Universities
Party	Candidate	Votes	%	±%
Unionist	George Andreas Berry	Unopposed		
Liberal	Dugald Cowan	Unopposed		
Unionist	Henry Craik	Unopposed		

== See also ==
- 1923 United Kingdom general election in England
- 1923 United Kingdom general election in Wales
- 1923 United Kingdom general election in Northern Ireland
