= Ellis-Griffith baronets =

Extinct baronetcy in the Baronetage of the United Kingdom

1st Baronet

The Ellis-Griffith Baronetcy, of Llanidan in the County of Anglesey, was a title in the Baronetage of the United Kingdom. It was created on 26 January 1918 for the barrister and Liberal politician Ellis Ellis-Griffith. He was succeeded by his only surviving son, the second Baronet. On his early death in 1934 the title became extinct.

== Ellis-Griffith baronets, of Llanidan (1918) ==
- Sir Ellis Jones Ellis-Griffith, 1st Baronet (1860–1926)
- Sir Elis Arundell Ellis-Griffith, 2nd Baronet (1896–1934)

Coat of arms of Ellis-Griffith of Llanidan
Crest 1st, in front of a griffin’s head erased Gules, a scaling ladder fessewise Or (Griffith); 2nd, in front of a wolf’s head erased Sable, a hunting horn, stringed Or (Ellis). Escutcheon Quarterly, 1st and 4th: Argent, on a mount Vert a griffin segreant Gules, supporting a spear proper (Griffith); 2nd and 3rd: Or, a saltire Vert between two crescents in fesse and as many wolves’ heads erased in pale Sable (Ellis). Motto Trech tynged nag arfeath
