= 1923 United Kingdom general election in Northern Ireland =

- 6 December 1923

All 13 seats in Northern Ireland to the House of Commons
- Turnout: 76.5% (▼0.7 pp)

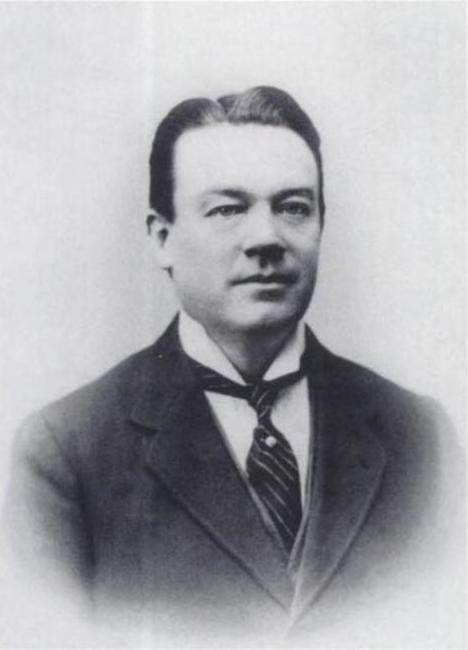
	First party	Second party
Leader	James Craig	Joe Devlin
Party	UUP	Nationalist
Alliance	Conservative
Leader since	7 June 1921	14 December 1918
Leader's seat	Did not stand (Note: Craig sat as an Member of Parliament for Down in the Northern Ireland Parliament.)	Did not stand (Note: Devlin sat as an MP for Belfast West in the Northern Ireland Parliament.)
Last election	11 seats, 55.8%	2 seats, 36.3%
Seats won	11 (Note: Includes 9 members elected unopposed.)	2
Seat change	Steady	Steady
Popular vote	117,161 (Note: Voting only took place in 4 of 13 seats. The other 9 MPs were unopposed.)	87,671
Percentage	49.4%	27.3%
Swing	▼6.4 pp	▼9.0 pp

The 1923 United Kingdom general election in Northern Ireland was held on 6 December as part of the wider general election. There were ten constituencies, seven single-seat constituencies with elected by FPTP and three two-seat constituencies with MPs elected by bloc voting. Only three of the constituencies had contested elections.

Nationally, the election led to an overall drop in seats for the Conservative Party, with the Liberal Party and Labor taking seats across the United Kingdom. The election saw the formation of the first Labour Government under Prime Minister Ramsay MacDonald, with the support of the reunited Liberal Party under H. H. Asquith; however, the Labour Government would only survive a year, owing to a vote of confidence the following year.

== Candidates ==
Below is a table summarising the candidates of the 1923 general election in Northern Ireland in the county and borough constituencies, and those in Queen's University of Belfast.

Affiliation	Candidates
Ulster Unionist Party	13
Nationalist Party	2
Independent Labour	1 (Note: Candidate Harry Midgley stood in Belfast West.)
Independent Unionist	1 (Note: Candidate Tommy Henderson stood in Belfast North.)
Total	17

== Results ==
Voting only took place for 4 of 13 seats. The other 9 MPs (all Ulster Unionists) were unopposed. The election saw no change in the representation of the 13 seats in Northern Ireland.

In the election as a whole, the Conservative Party, now led by Stanley Baldwin, lost its majority and the Labour Party formed a minority government with Ramsay MacDonald as Prime Minister. The Ulster Unionists sat as members of the Conservative Party.

Party	Leader	Candidates	Seats					Aggregate votes		
Party	Leader	Candidates	Total	Gains	Losses	Net	Of total (%)	Total	Of total (%) (Note: Adjusted for multi-member constituencies.)	Change (%)
UUP	James Craig	13	11	0	0	Steady	84.6	117,161	49.4	▼6.4
Nationalist	Joseph Devlin	2	2	0	0	Steady	15.4	87,671	27.3	▼9.0
Independent Labour	—N/a	1	0	Did not stand in 1922			—	22,225	13.8	—N/a
Independent Unionist	—N/a	1	0	Did not stand in 1922			—	15,171	9.5	—N/a
Total		17	13			0	100.0	242,258	100.0	0.0
Registered voters, and turnout								161,409 (Note: Electorate in contested constituencies. The total electorate was 608,877.)	76.5	▼0.7

Popular vote
UUP	49.4%
National	27.3%
Ind. Labour	13.8%
Ind. Unionist	9.5%

Parliamentary seats
UUP	84.6%
National	15.4%

== MPs elected ==
Constituency	Party	MP
Antrim	Ulster Unionist	Charles Craig
Antrim	Ulster Unionist	Hugh O'Neill
Armagh	Ulster Unionist	William Allen
Belfast East	Ulster Unionist	Herbert Dixon
Belfast North	Ulster Unionist	Thomas McConnell
Belfast South	Ulster Unionist	Thomas Moles
Belfast West	Ulster Unionist	Robert Lynn
Down	Ulster Unionist	David Reid
Down	Ulster Unionist	John Simms
Fermanagh and Tyrone	Nationalist Party	Thomas Harbison
Fermanagh and Tyrone	Nationalist Party	Cahir Healy
Londonderry	Ulster Unionist	Malcolm Macnaghten
Queen's University of Belfast	Ulster Unionist	Sir William Whitla

== See also ==
- 1923 United Kingdom general election in England
- 1923 United Kingdom general election in Scotland
- 1923 United Kingdom general election in Wales
