= 1923 United Kingdom general election in England =

- 6 December 1923

All 492 English seats to the House of Commons
- Turnout: 71.1% (▼1.7 pp)

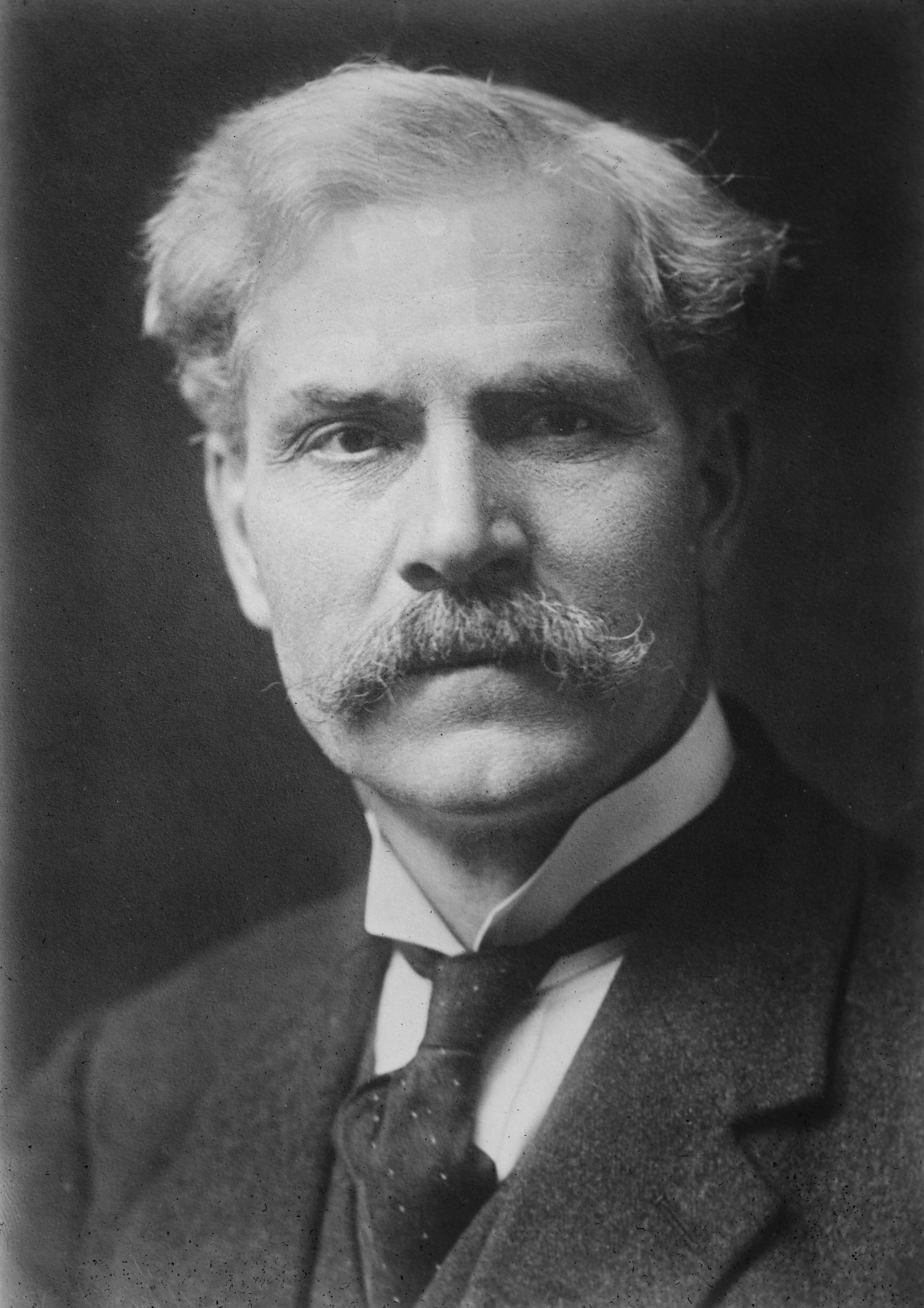

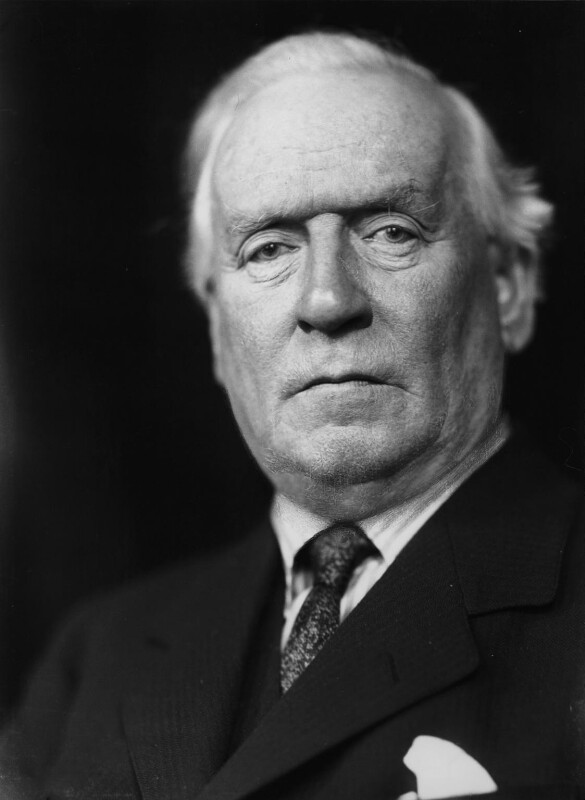
	First party	Second party	Third party
Leader	Stanley Baldwin	Ramsay MacDonald	H. H. Asquith
Party	Conservative	Labour	Liberal
Leader since	23 May 1923	22 November 1922	30 April 1908
Leader's seat	Bewdley	Aberavon	Paisley
Last election	312 seats, (Note: Combined results for county, borough and university seats.); 41.5%	95 seats, 28.8%	75 seats, (Note: The Liberal Party total and change is compared to the combined Liberal and National Liberal total in 1922); 27.2%
Seats won	227	138	124 (Note: Figure includes Speaker of the House of Commons John Henry Whitley in Halifax.)
Seat change	▼85	▲43	▲48
Popular vote	4,732,176 (Note: Total and percentage votes given here are for territorial constituencies only.)	3,549,888	3,572,335
Percentage	39.8%	29.7%	29.9%
Swing	▼1.7 pp	▲0.9 pp	▲2.7 pp

On Thursday 6 December 1923, the 1923 United Kingdom general election was held in England, to elect all 615 members of the House of Commons, with 492 constituencies being in England. 485 seats represented territorial constituencies contested under the first past the post electoral system, and seven additional seats represented the university constituencies. Three university constituencies returned two members through the single transferable vote electoral system and one returned one member by the first past the post system.

The election led to an overall drop in seats for the Conservative Party, with the Liberal Party and Labor taking seats across the United Kingdom. The election saw the formation of the first Labour Government under Prime Minister Ramsay MacDonald, with the support of the reunited Liberal Party under H. H. Asquith; however, the Labour Government would only survive a year, owing to a vote of confidence the following year.

== Candidates ==
Below is a table summarising the candidates of the 1923 general election in England, excluding those in the university constituencies.

Affiliation	Candidates
Conservative and Unionist Party	444
Liberal Party	362
Labour Party	343
Co-operative Party	7
Independent	4 (Note: The candidates that stood were Ray Strachey in Brentford and Chiswick, Oswald Mosley in Harrow, James Bustard in Manchester Moss Side and Austin Hopkinson in Mossley.)
Nationalist Party	2 (Note: The candidates that stood were William Grogan in Liverpool Exchange and T. P. O'Connor in Liverpool Scotland.)
Constitutionalist	1 (Note: Candidate George Jarrett stood in Dartford.)
Independent Conservative	1 (Note: Candidate Thomas Newbold stood in Derby.)
Independent Labour	1 (Note: Candidate Henry Mills stood in Nottingham South.)
Free Trade	1 (Note: Candidate A. Ford stood in Birmingham Duddeston.)
Total	1,166

== Analysis ==
=== Conservatives and Labour ===
The Labour Party overall gained 43 seats in England, the vast majority of its overall 47 seat gain nationally, taking a several seats from both the Conservatives and reunited Liberals. The Co-operative Party under the Labour Whip won a total of four seats (an increase of one compared to the last election), Samuel Perry, regaining Kettering (the party's first seat in 1918) for the party, following the party's loss in the previous election. The party otherwise retained East Ham South, Sheffield Hillsborough and Tottenham North. Although Labour did not gain the greatest number of seats in England or indeed nationally, Leader of the Labour Party Ramsay MacDonald would become Prime Minister with the support of the Liberal Party, forming the first Labour Government; however, the instability and several controversies leading to a vote of confidence brought another election the following year.

The Conservatives under new leader Stanley Baldwin lost a total of 85 seats at the election overall, losing 109 in the county and borough constituencies but gaining 17, along with gaining a seat among the seven available in the university constituencies. Notably, the Conservatives gained Sedgefield from Labour by only six votes. Edward Cavendish took the seat of West Derbyshire, and would hold it until 1938. Future Minister Victor Warrender gained Grantham, holding the seat until 1942.

Amongst the other gains in England for the Conservatives were Eye, Penrith and Cockermouth, Belper, Middleton and Prestwich, Worcester, Holderness and Grantham, Romford, Sheffield Park, South West Norfolk from the reunited Liberal Party.

=== Reunited Liberal Party ===
David Lloyd George's National Liberal Party had reunited with the Liberal Party under H. H. Asquith since the last election, and the party managed to gain a net of 48 seats in England. Combined with the loss of five seats in Scotland, and no change in Wales, the party gained an overall 43 seats nationally.

The party took 69 seats from the Conservatives, along with several gains from the Labour Party. Amongst these gains was the Liberal win in Battersea North wherein the party took the seat from Labour Member of Parliament (and Communist Party member) Shapurji Saklatvala. The Liberals made several other gains from Labour, including the urban and semi-urban seats of Accrington, Bermondsey West, Burslem, Dewsbury, Elland, Gateshead, Keighley, Newcastle upon Tyne East and Rochdale from the Labour Party. In Newcastle upon Tyen East, the Liberals took the seat from former Leader of the Labour Party Arthur Henderson who had retained the seat in the 1923 Newcastle-upon-Tyne East by-election for Labour in the by-election. As such, it was a gain from Labour in comparison to 1922.

However, the party also lost the central urban seats of Bristol East, Bristol North, Leicester East, Northampton, Wellingborough, Lichfield and Shipley. Additionally, it lost Shoreditch, Southwark North and Southwark South East in the County of London. These were losses to the Labour Party. It also lost one of the two seats in both Bolton and Norwich to Labour. Winston Churchill, who was still a member of the reunited Liberal Party after having rejoined with the Liberal National Party, unsuccessfully contested the Labour-held seat of Leicester West, after having been unseated in Scotland at the last election.

=== Minor parties and independents ===
Independent Oswald Mosley held Harrow with a reduced majority, with Austin Hopkinson holding Mossley also with a reduced majority. Feminist Ray Strachey contested Brentford and Chiswick for a second time but was again unsuccessful. However, George Roberts, who had moved from being Coalition Labour to an independent in the last election, lost his seat in Norwich standing as a candidate for the Conservative Party. The loss of Norwich was a gain for Labour, with the party also having taking the other of the two seats in Norwich from the Liberals. The independent seats in England and nationally were consequently reduced to two at this election.

In comparison to the last election, the number of Independent Conservative MPs was reduced to no seats in England and the United Kingdom due to such Members of Parliament joining the Conservative Party following the previous election, with far fewer of such candidates in England. James Erskine, who had won as an Independent Conservative in the last election, retained Westminster St George's unopposed, though did so as the official Conservative Party candidate for the seat. Similarly, Harry Becker, who had won Richmond (Surrey) as an Independent Conservative under the sponsorship of the Anti-Waste League in the last election, retained the seat also as the official Conservative candidate in this election. Gordon Hall Caine in East Dorset, a former Independent Conservative MP, had also taken the Conservative Whip by 1923, and retained the seat as a Conservative. As such, these were Conservative seat gains from initially being held by Conservative Independents.

The Conservative Party also gained a seat in the university constituencies. In Cambridge University, Conservative candidate John Rawlinson retaining his seat, with Conservative Geoffrey G. Butler taking the second seat after winning the second round of voting. As such, incumbent Independent Liberal J. R. M. Butler lost in the second round. The Conservatives therefore held six of the seven seats among the universities, with all other seats in the university constituencies remaining unchanged.

== Seat summary ==
Below is a table summarising the total number of seats, gains and losses for each party in both the territorial county and borough constituencies and the English university constituencies.

Party	Seats				
Party	Total	Gains	Losses	Net	Of all (%)
Conservative	227	17	102	▼85	56.3
Labour (Total)	138	55	12	▲43	28.0
Labour	134	54	12	▲42	27.2
Co-operative Party	4	1	0	▲1	0.8
Liberal	124	76	28	▲48	25.2
Independent	2	0	1	▼1	0.4
Irish Nationalist	1	0	0	Steady	0.2
Ind. Conservative	0	0	3	▼3	—
Constitutionalist	0	0	1	▼1	—
Independent Liberal	0	0	1	▼1	—
Total	492				

== County and borough constituency results ==
Below is a table summarising the constituency results of the 1923 general election in England, excluding the result in the university constituencies.

Party	Seats					Aggregate votes		
Party	Total	Gains	Losses	Net	Of all (%)	Total	Of all (%) (Note: Adjusted for multi-member constituencies.)	Change (%)
Conservative	221	16	102	▼86	55.9	4,732,176	39.8	▼1.7
Labour (Total)	138	55	12	▲43	28.5	3,549,888	29.7	▲0.9
Labour	134	54	12	▲42	27.7	3,471,125	29.0	▲1.0
Co-operative Party	4	1 (Note: Samuel Perry in Kettering.)	0	▲1	0.8	78,763	0.7	▼0.1
Liberal	123	76	28	▲48	25.4	3,572,355	29.9	▲2.7
Independent	2 (Note: Oswald Mosley in Harrow and Austin Hopkinson in Mossley.)	0	1 (Note: George Roberts in Norwich, though Roberts stood as a Conservative candidate in the seat at this election.)	▼1	0.4	31,282	0.3	▼0.7
Constitutionalist	0	0	1 (Note: George Jarrett in Dartford.)	▼1	—	15,500	0.1	Steady
Irish Nationalist	1 (Note: T. P. O'Connor in Liverpool Scotland.)	0	0	Steady	0.2	10,322	0.1	Steady
Ind. Conservative	0	0	3	▼3	—	9,772	0.1	▼0.8
Independent Labour	0	0	0	Steady	—	5,176	0.0	Steady
Free Trade	0	New			—	634	0.0	New
Total	485			0	100.0	11,927,085	100.0	0.0
Registered voters, and turnout						16,128,599 (Note: Electorate in contested constituencies. The total electorate was 17,079,822.)	71.1	▼1.7

Popular vote
Conservative	39.8%
Liberal	29.9%
Labour	29.7%
Other	0.6%

Parliament seats
Conservative	55.9%
Labour	28.5%
Liberal	25.4%
Other	0.6%

== University constituency results ==
=== University results summary ===
Below is a table summarising the seats and vote share of the English university constituencies in the 1923 general election.

Party	Seats				First preference votes	
Party	Total	Gains	Losses	Net	Total	Of all (%)
Conservative	6	1	0	▲1	18,565	61.1
Liberal	1	0	0	Steady	6,277	20.7
Independent Liberal	0	0	1	▼1	3,248	10.7
Labour	0	0	0	Steady	2,270	7.5
Total	7				30,360	

=== Cambridge University ===
The constituency for Cambridge University returned two Members of Parliament using the single transferable vote electoral system. The electorate consisted of graduates of the university.

General election 1923: Cambridge University (2 seats)
Party	Candidate	FPv%	Count	
Party	Candidate	FPv%	1	2
Conservative	John Rawlinson	40.85	4,207	
Conservative	Geoffrey G. Butler	27.61	2,844	3,560
Independent Liberal	J. R. M. Butler	31.54	3,248	3,283
Electorate: 14,974 Valid: 10,229 Quota: 3,434 Turnout: 68.78%

=== Combined English Universities ===
The Combined English Universities constituency, which represented effectively all red brick universities and Durham University, returned two Members of Parliament using the single transferable vote electoral system. The electorate consisted of graduates of the university.

General election 1923: Combined English Universities (2 seats)
Party	Candidate	FPv%	Count
Party	Candidate	FPv%	1
Conservative	Martin Conway	44.1	1,711
Liberal	H. A. L. Fisher	34.0	1,316
Labour	Joseph Findlay	21.9	850
Electorate: 5,008 Valid: 3,877 Quota: 1,293 Turnout: 77.4%

=== London University ===
The constituency for London University returned one Member of Parliament using the First-past-the-post electoral system. The electorate consisted of graduates of the university.

General election 1923: London University
Party	Candidate	Votes	%	±%
Conservative	Sydney Russell-Wells	4,037	50.15	−1.37
Liberal	Albert Pollard	2,593	32.21	+2.91
Labour	H. G. Wells	1,420	17.64	−1.54
Majority		1,444	17.94	−4.28
Turnout		8,050	71.28	+3.64
Registered electors		11,293		
Conservative hold		Swing	−2.14	

=== Oxford University ===
The constituency for Oxford University returned two Members of Parliament using the single transferable vote electoral system. The electorate consisted of graduates of the university.

General Election 1923: Oxford University (2 seats)
Party	Candidate	FPv%	Count	
Party	Candidate	FPv%	1	2
Conservative	Lord Hugh Cecil	43.77	3,560	
Conservative	Charles Oman	27.12	2,206	2,950
Liberal	Gilbert Murray	29.11	2,368	2,472
Electorate: 10,814 Valid: 8,134 Quota: 2,712 Turnout: 75.22%

== See also ==
- 1923 United Kingdom general election in Scotland
- 1923 United Kingdom general election in Wales
- 1923 United Kingdom general election in Northern Ireland
