= Sir Robert Thomas, 1st Baronet =

British politician (1873–1951)

Sir Robert Thomas

Sir Robert John Thomas, 1st Baronet (23 April 1873 – 27 September 1951) was a Welsh businessman and Liberal Party politician, who was twice elected to Parliament.

Thomas was a ship and insurance broker. In 1918 he was created a Baronet, of Garreglwyd in the County of Anglesey.

== Politics ==
He was elected at the 1918 general election as the Member of Parliament (MP) for the new constituency of Wrexham. Standing as a Liberal, with the official backing of the David Lloyd George led Coalition Government, he faced only a Labour Party opponent and won 76% of the votes.

General election 1918: Wrexham
Party	Candidate	Votes	%	±%
Liberal	Robert Thomas	20,874	76.3	n/a
Labour	Hugh Hughes	6,500	23.7	n/a
Majority		14,374	52.6	n/a
Turnout			69.7	n/a
Liberal win				

At the 1922 general election he stood as a National Liberal Party candidate for Anglesey, losing by a margin of 9% to the sitting Labour MP Sir Owen Thomas.

1922 General Election: Anglesey
Party	Candidate	Votes	%	±%
Labour	Owen Thomas	11,929	54.2	+3.8
National Liberal	Robert Thomas	10,067	45.8	−3.8
Majority		1,862	8.4	+7.6
Turnout			80.5	
Labour hold		Swing	-3.8	

However, Owen Thomas died in January 1923, and at the resulting by-election in April Robert Thomas won a 3-way contest with 53% of the votes, and a 23% majority over the second-placed Labour candidate.

1923 Anglesey by-election
Party	Candidate	Votes	%	±%
Liberal	Robert Thomas	11,116	53.3	+7.5
Labour	Edward John	6,368	30.5	−23.7
Unionist	Richard Owen Roberts	3,385	16.2	n/a
Majority			22.8	
Turnout			76.4	
Liberal gain from Labour		Swing	+15.6	

He was returned unopposed at the general election in December 1923. He was returned by a majority of 28% over his Labour opponent at the election in 1924.

General election 1924: Anglesey
Party	Candidate	Votes	%	±%
Liberal	Robert Thomas	13,407	63.9	
Labour	Cyril O Jones	7,580	36.1	
Majority		5,827	27.8	
Turnout			74	
Liberal hold		Swing		

He stood down from Parliament at the 1929 general election.

== Arms ==
Coat of arms of Sir Robert Thomas, 1st Baronet

Crest
On the waves of the sea Proper between two anchors Sable a ship in full sail Proper.
Escutcheon
Per pale Gules and Azure on a chevron Argent between in dexter chief a sower scattering seed and in sinister chief on eagle displayed both Or and in base a garb of the last three fleurs-de-lis Sable.
Motto
Fac Recte Et Nil Time

Parliament of the United Kingdom
New constituency	Member of Parliament for Wrexham; 1918 – 1922	Succeeded by Robert Richards
Preceded by Sir Owen Thomas	Member of Parliament for Anglesey; 1923 – 1929	Succeeded by Megan Lloyd George
Baronetage of the United Kingdom
New creation	Baronet (of Garreglwyd); 1918 – 1951	Succeeded by William Eustace Rhyddlad Thomas
