= 1923 Anglesey by-election =

UK parliamentary by-election

- 7 April 1923

Candidate	Thomas	John	Roberts
Party	Liberal	Labour	Unionist
Popular vote	11,116	6,368	3,385
Percentage	53.3%	30.5%	16.2%
MP before election
Owen Thomas
Independent Labour
Subsequent MP
Robert Thomas
Liberal

The 1923 Anglesey by-election was a parliamentary by-election for the British House of Commons constituency of Anglesey on 7 April 1923.

== Vacancy ==
The by-election was caused by the death of the sitting Labour MP, Sir Owen Thomas on 17 January 1923. He had been MP here since winning the seat in 1918.

== Election history ==
Anglesey had been won by either the Liberal Party or the Whigs at every election since 1784, until Thomas surprisingly gained it as an independent Labour candidate in 1918. He held onto it at the 1922 general election, standing as an Independent. The result at the last General Election was as follows;

Owen Thomas

General election 1922: Anglesey
Party	Candidate	Votes	%	±%
Independent Labour	Owen Thomas	11,929	54.2	+3.8
National Liberal	Robert Thomas	10,067	45.8	−3.8
Majority		1,862	8.4	+7.6
Turnout		21,996	80.5	+11.1
Registered electors		27,320		
Independent Labour hold		Swing	+3.8	

== Candidates ==
- The Labour Party selected Edward John to defend the seat. He had been Liberal MP for East Denbighshire from December 1910-18. John, a pacifist, had left the Liberals to stand unsuccessfully as a Labour candidate in 1918. He was a prominent Welsh Nationalist.
- The Liberal candidate was again Sir Robert Thomas, the former Wrexham MP who had fought here at the 1922 general election. Thomas was a ship and insurance broker. Thomas had been allied to Lloyd George and had stood as a National Liberal last time. Even though the Liberals nationally had been divided between followers of Asquith and Lloyd George, the local Liberals managed to unite behind Thomas.
- Even though the Coalition Government between the National Liberals and the Unionists had ended, the local Unionists chose not to contest the seat in 1922. However, for the by-election, they decided to intervene and field their own candidate, Richard Owen Roberts. Roberts had stood for the Unionists at Anglesey in 1910. He was a Barrister and sat on the London County Council for Lewisham East.

== Campaign ==
Labour's campaign was supported by visits from national figures such as Arthur Henderson, and a host of Labour MPs from south Wales such as David Watts Morgan, Tom Griffiths, David Grenfell and T. I. Mardy Jones, as well as prominent Welsh nationalist figures such as future Liberal MP William John Gruffydd and Principal Thomas Rees. John called for Welsh Home Rule, even though it was not Labour Party policy.

== Result ==
The Liberal Party gained the seat from Labour and the Unionists trailed a poor third;

Robert Thomas

1923 Anglesey by-election
Party	Candidate	Votes	%	±%
Liberal	Robert Thomas	11,116	53.3	+7.5
Labour	Edward John	6,368	30.5	−23.7
Unionist	Richard Owen Roberts	3,385	16.2	N/A
Majority		4,748	22.8	N/A
Turnout		20,869	76.4	−4.1
Registered electors		27,320		
Liberal gain from Independent Labour		Swing	+15.6	

The good Liberal result spurred moves towards Liberal reunion at a national level. Within days, the two Liberal groups in the House of Lords decided to accept Viscount Grey as their leader in the Lords.

== Aftermath ==
Sir Robert Thomas sat for the constituency until retiring in 1929. The Liberal Party held the constituency until 1951. The result at the following General election;

General election 1923: Anglesey
Party	Candidate	Votes	%	±%
Liberal	Robert Thomas	Unopposed		
Registered electors		28,135		
Liberal hold				

John did not stand again. Roberts did not stand again and became a County Court Judge in 1924.

== See also ==
- 1837 Anglesey by-election
- 1907 Anglesey by-election
- List of United Kingdom by-elections
- United Kingdom by-election records
