= Owen Thomas (politician) =

Welsh politician

Brigadier-General Sir Owen Thomas MP JP DL

Member of Parliament for Anglesey
- In office 14 December 1918 – 6 March 1923
- Preceded by: Sir Ellis Ellis-Griffith, Bt
- Succeeded by: Sir Robert Thomas, Bt

Personal details
- Born: 18 December 1858 Anglesey
- Died: 6 March 1923 (aged 64)
- Resting place: Ebenezer Cemetery, Llanfechell
- Party: Independent Labour
- Other political affiliations: Liberal, Labour
- Spouse: Frederica Pershouse
- Children: 5
- Parents: Owen Thomas (father); Ellen Thomas (mother)
- Education: Liverpool College

Military service
- Allegiance: United Kingdom
- Branch/service: British Army
- Rank: Brigadier-General
- Unit: 3rd (Militia) Battalion Manchester Regiment; 2nd Volunteer Battalion, Royal Welch Fusiliers; Prince of Wales Light Horse Regiment
- Commands: Prince of Wales Light Horse
- Battles/wars: Second Boer War; First World War

Sir Owen Thomas, JP, DL (18 December 1858 – 6 March 1923) was a Welsh politician who served as the Member of Parliament for Anglesey.

== Early life and education ==
Thomas was born at Carrog on Anglesey on 18 December 1858. He was educated at Liverpool College, and afterwards became a farmer.

== Political career ==
As a farmer, during 1893-7 he sat as member of the Royal Commission on Agricultural Depression; he and Lord Rendel were the only representatives of Wales on that body. Thomas took an interest in politics and stood unsuccessfully for the Liberal Party in Oswestry at the 1895 United Kingdom general election. At the 1918 United Kingdom general election, he was elected for Anglesey as an independent labour candidate. He joined the Labour Party group in Parliament but resigned the party whip in 1920, and was re-elected in 1922 as an independent. He died in 1923, causing the 1923 Anglesey by-election.

== Military career ==
Thomas raised the Prince of Wales Light Horse regiment in 1899 to serve in the Second Boer War.

He commanded the regiment and later became a temporary brigadier general in October 1914, commanding the North Wales Brigade of the Territorial Force. He also served as chief officer of the Life-Saving Apparatus at Sea section of the Board of Trade, and in his spare time bred farm stock.

He was knighted on 21 February 1917.

Parliament of the United Kingdom
Preceded by Sir Ellis Ellis-Griffith, Bt	Member of Parliament for Anglesey; 1918 – 1923	Succeeded by Sir Robert Thomas, Bt
