= Ellis Ellis-Griffith =

British barrister and politician (1860–1926)

The Right Honourable, Sir Ellis Ellis-Griffith Bt KC

Under-Secretary of State for the Home Department
- In office 19 February 1912 – 4 February 1915
- Prime Minister: H. H. Asquith
- Preceded by: Charles Masterman
- Succeeded by: Cecil Harmsworth

Member of Parliament for Carmarthen
- In office 6 December 1923 – 19 July 1924
- Preceded by: John Hinds
- Succeeded by: Alfred Mond

Member of Parliament for Anglesey
- In office 13 July 1895 – 14 December 1918
- Preceded by: Thomas Lewis
- Succeeded by: Owen Thomas

Personal details
- Born: Ellis Jones Ellis-Griffith; 23 May 1860 Birmingham, Warwickshire, UK
- Died: 30 November 1926 (aged 66) Metropole Hotel, Swansea, Wales, UK
- Party: Liberal (Before 1916, 1921–1926)
- Other political affiliations: Coalition Liberal (1916–1921)
- Spouse: Mary Owen (m. 1892)
- Children: 3
- Parents: Thomas Morris Griffith (father); Jane Jones (mother)
- Education: Holt Academy
- Alma mater: University College, Aberystwyth, University of London, Downing College, Cambridge
- Occupation: Barrister

Sir Ellis Jones Ellis-Griffith, 1st Baronet, PC, KC (23 May 1860 – 30 November 1926) was a British barrister and radical Liberal politician. He was born Ellis Jones Griffith.

== Early life and career ==
Griffith was the only child of Thomas Morris Griffith (1827-1901), a master builder, and his wife Jane (née Jones) (1823-1881). Both his parents were Welsh, but had been living in Birmingham at the time of his birth, before moving to Brynsiencyn when Griffith was a child.

He was initially educated at the Holt Academy, and passed both the Cambridge & Oxford local examinations in 1873. The following year he passed a scholarship examination for the University College, Aberystwyth, where he began studying in 1876. He took an arts degree at the University of London in 1879, graduating with double honours in English and Philosophy, before moving to Downing College, Cambridge, in 1880, where he read law and was President of the Cambridge Union.

== Legal career ==
Ellis Griffith c.1895

Griffith was called to the Bar, Middle Temple, in 1887 and worked on the North Wales and Chester Circuit. Among his most notable cases was his defence of Major Spilsbury in the Gibraltar Tourmaline smuggling case in 1898. He was Recorder of Birkenhead from 1907 to 1912 and was appointed a King's Counsel in 1910.

== Political career ==
Griffith initially stood unsuccessfully for West Toxteth in 1892 but in 1895 was successfully returned to Parliament for Anglesey. He was returned unopposed in 1900.

Upon his appointment as Recorder of Birkenhead in 1907 he was required to re-submit himself to his electorate at Anglesey and was returned unopposed. Whilst an MP he voted in favour of the 1908 Women's Enfranchisement Bill. He served in the Liberal administration of H. H. Asquith as Under-Secretary of State for the Home Department from 1912 to 1915, in which position he played an important role in steering the Welsh Disestablishment Bill through the House of Commons, and was sworn of the Privy Council in 1914. In 1918 he was created a baronet, of Llanidan in the County of Anglesey and changed his surname to Ellis-Griffith.

He was narrowly defeated at Anglesey in the 1918 general election by the Labour candidate Owen Thomas. He then unsuccessfully contested the University of Wales constituency in 1922, before returning to the House of Commons in 1923, when he was elected for Carmarthen, but he resigned the seat the following year, citing personal unfulfillment in his parliamentary career.

=== Elections contested ===
==== UK Parliament elections ====
Date of election	Constituency	Party	Votes	%	Result
1892	Liverpool West Toxteth	Liberal	2,479	40.8	Not elected (2nd)
1895	Anglesey	Liberal	4,224	56.9	Elected
1900	Anglesey	Liberal	Unopposed		Elected
1906	Anglesey	Liberal	5,356	67.0	Elected
1910 (Jan)	Anglesey	Liberal	5,888	70.7	Elected
1910 (Dec)	Anglesey	Liberal	Unopposed		Elected
1918	Anglesey	Coalition Liberal	8.898	49.6	Not elected (2nd)
1922	University of Wales	Liberal	451	35.9	Not elected (2nd)
1923	Carmarthen	Liberal	12,988	45.1	Elected

== Personal life & death ==
Ellis-Griffith married Mary Owen (1862-1941), daughter of Robert Owen, in 1892. They had two sons and one daughter (b. 1903). The couple's only surviving son, Ellis succeeded in the baronetcy after his father's death, but died without issue in 1934.

In November 1926, Ellis-Griffith (who had previously suffered small bouts of ill health) was in Swansea, as defence in a manslaughter case at the assizes court. It was noted during the day that Griffith appeared unwell, and after retiring to his room at the Metropole Hotel that evening, he was found by two colleagues, in great pain, on the floor. Despite receiving medical treatment, he died at the scene, aged 66. His wife was in the Italian Riviera at the time of his death, and was brought home shortly afterwards. The cause of death was later ruled as apoplexy. He was buried at St Nidan's Church, Llanidan on the 4 December.

Parliament of the United Kingdom
Preceded by Thomas Lewis	Member of Parliament for Anglesey; 1895–1918	Succeeded by Sir Owen Thomas
Preceded by John Hinds	Member of Parliament for Carmarthen; 1923–1924	Succeeded by Sir Alfred Mond, Bt
Political offices
Preceded by Charles Masterman	Under-Secretary of State for the Home Department; 1912–1915	Succeeded by Cecil Harmsworth
Baronetage of the United Kingdom
New creation	Baronet (of Llanindan); 1918–1926	Succeeded by Ellis Arundell Ellis-Griffith
