= 1923 United Kingdom general election =

- 6 December 1923

All 615 seats in the House of Commons 308 seats needed for a majority
- Registered: 21,283,061
- Turnout: 14,547,695; 71.1% (▼1.9 pp)

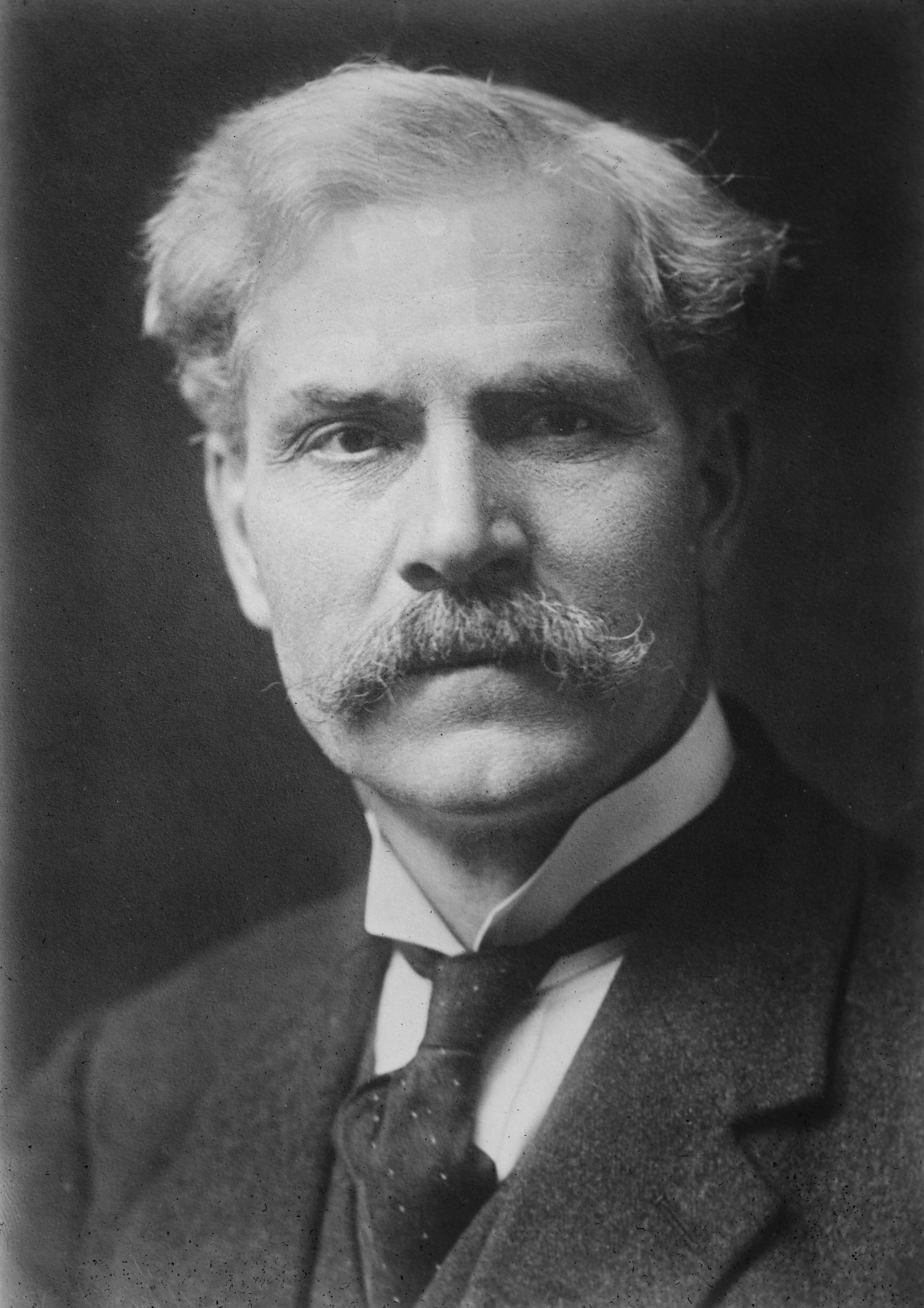

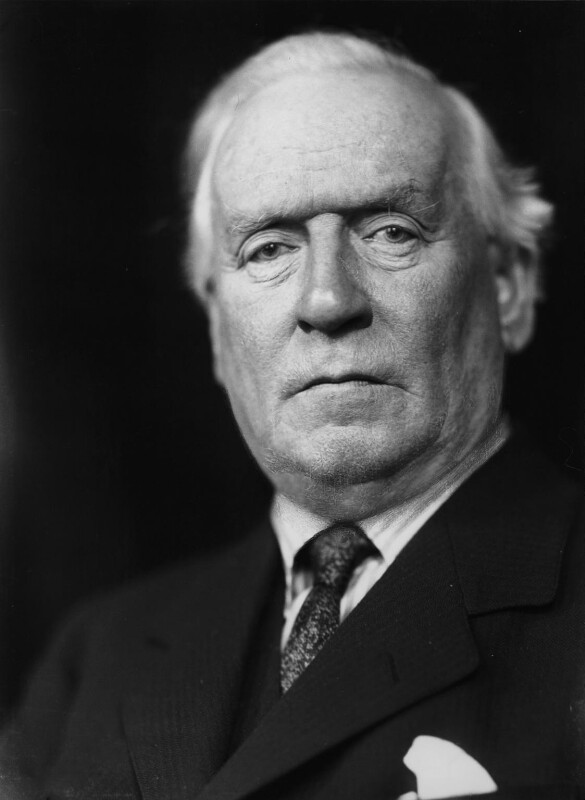
	First party	Second party	Third party
Leader	Stanley Baldwin	Ramsay MacDonald	H. H. Asquith
Party	Conservative	Labour	Liberal
Leader since	23 May 1923	21 November 1922	30 April 1908
Leader's seat	Bewdley	Aberavon	Paisley
Last election	344 seats, 38.5%	142 seats, 29.7%	115 seats, 28.8% (Note: This represents the joint total of the Liberals and the National Liberals in the 1922 election. The two parties reunified for the 1923 election.)
Seats won	258	191	158 (Note: Figure includes Speaker of the House of Commons John Henry Whitley in Halifax.)
Seat change	▼86	▲49	▲43
Popular vote	5,514,541	4,439,780	4,301,481
Percentage	38.0%	30.7%	29.7%
Swing	▼0.5 pp	▲1.0 pp	▲1.1 pp
- Colours denote the winning party—as shown in § Results

- Composition of the House of Commons following the 1923 general election
Prime Minister before election
Stanley Baldwin
Conservative
Prime Minister after election
Ramsay MacDonald
Labour

A general election was held in the United Kingdom on Thursday 6 December 1923. The Conservatives, led by Prime Minister Stanley Baldwin, won the most seats, but Labour, led by Ramsay MacDonald, and H. H. Asquith's reunited Liberal Party gained enough seats to produce a hung parliament. It is the most recent UK general election in which a third party won over 100 seats (158 for the Liberals) and the smallest margin (100 seats) between the first and third parties since. The Liberals' percentage of the vote, 28.8%, trailed Labour's by only one percentage point and has not been exceeded by a third party at any general election since.

MacDonald formed the first Labour government with tacit support from the Liberals. Rather than trying to bring the Liberals back into government, Asquith's motivation for permitting Labour to enter power was that he hoped they would prove to be incompetent and quickly lose support. Being a minority, MacDonald's government only lasted ten months, and another general election was held in October 1924.

== Overview ==
In May 1923, Prime Minister Bonar Law fell ill and resigned on 22 May, after just 209 days in office. He was replaced by Chancellor of the Exchequer, Stanley Baldwin. The Labour Party had also changed leaders since the previous election, after J. R. Clynes was defeated in a leadership challenge by former leader Ramsay MacDonald.

Having won an election just the year before, Baldwin's Conservative Party had a comfortable majority in the House of Commons and could have waited another four years, but the government was concerned and the Conservatives were divided. Baldwin felt the need to receive a mandate from the people, which, if successful, would strengthen his grip on the Conservative Party leadership and allow him to introduce tariff reform and imperial preference as protectionist trade policies over the objections of the free trade elements of his party.

Oxford historian and Conservative MP John Marriott depicts the gloomy national mood:

The times were still out of joint. Mr. Baldwin had indeed succeeded in negotiating (January 1923) a settlement of the British debt to the United States, but on terms which involved an annual payment of £34 million, at the existing rate of exchange. The French remained in the Ruhr. Peace had not yet been made with Turkey; unemployment was a standing menace to national recovery; there was continued unrest among the wage-earners, and a significant strike among farm labourers in Norfolk.

Confronted by these difficulties, convinced that economic conditions in England called for a drastic change in fiscal policy, and urged thereto by the Imperial Conference of 1923, Mr. Baldwin decided to ask the country for a mandate for Preference and Protection.

Parliament was dissolved on 16 November and the result backfired on Baldwin, who lost a host of seats to Labour and the Liberals, resulting in a hung parliament.

The Liberals' gains were regionally concentrated: they made sweeping gains across the South-West, including areas such as Bath, Salisbury, Wells, Bridgwater, St Ives, Weston-Super-Mare and Torquay. They increased their share of the vote from 45.2% to 51.3% in those constituencies where a straight fight with the Conservatives had taken place in both 1922 and 1923.

A reformation of the Conservative-Liberal coalition which had governed the country from 1918 to 1922 was not practical, as Baldwin had alienated both of the most prominent Liberals, Asquith and David Lloyd George.

=== Aftermath ===
Faced with the decision of whether to support a minority Conservative or Labour government on an issue-by-issue basis, Asquith ultimately chose to support the Labour government. This decision was influenced by Lloyd George's faction, which was strongly opposed to collaborating with Baldwin, and the belief amongst the Liberals as a whole that Labour's electoral success was largely due to the previous split within the Liberal Party. Asquith anticipated that a Labour government would reveal Labour's policies as impractical, thereby enabling the Liberals to surpass them in the subsequent election. Consequently, the Liberals joined forces with Labour to defeat Baldwin's King's Speech, leading to the fall of his government and allowing the Labour Party to form its first government.

== Campaign ==
The Conservative manifesto said that action would be taken to "impose duties on imported manufactured goods" in order "to raise revenue" and "give special assistance" to industries facing unfair foreign competition while negotiating for "a reduction of foreign tariffs" to help British exports and giving "substantial preference to the Empire."

In Liverpool, Baldwin was asked how shipping would be affected by protectionism, and he replied that Liverpool's prosperity began before free trade "and to imagine that it would decline on a return to protection, or indeed that any responsible statesman could support measures that would put it in peril, was absurd."

Labour's manifesto said that Labour would "abolish the slums [and] build an adequate supply of decent homes." Labour also planned to nationalise mines, railways and power stations. Under their plans, "a non-recurring, graduated war debt redemption levy" was announced for "all individual fortunes in excess of £5,000." MacDonald said proceeds of the levy would be used to reduce debt.

The Liberal manifesto condemned the government’s failure to prevent the French and Belgian occupation of the Ruhr and claimed that the maintenance of a peace on a long-term basis was dependent upon Europe’s economic recovery. The Liberals also advocated the admittance of all countries to the League of Nations and pledged to re-open diplomatic relations with the Soviet Union. In addition, the programme contained a planned national credit to ease unemployment, and the Liberals had plans for afforestation.

== Results ==
=== Summary of seats returned ===
Party	Leader	MPs		Aggregate votes	
Party	Leader		Of total		Of total (Note: Adjusted for multi-member constituencies.)
Conservative and Unionist Party	Stanley Baldwin	258	42.0%	5,514,541	38.0%
Conservative Party (Note: Results for England and Wales.)	Stanley Baldwin	231	37.6%	4,928,854	34.3%
Unionist Party	George Younger	16	2.6%	468,526	3.2%
Ulster Unionist Party	James Craig	11	1.8%	117,161	0.5%
Labour Party	Ramsay MacDonald	191	31.1%	4,439,780	30.7%
Labour Party	Ramsay MacDonald	185	30.1%	4,331,856	29.9%
Co-operative Party	—N/a	6	1.0%	107,924	0.8%
Liberal Party	H. H. Asquith	158	25.7%	4,301,481	29.7%
Nationalist Party	Joseph Devlin	2	0.3%	87,671	0.3%
Independent	—N/a	2	0.3%	31,282	0.2%
Scottish Prohibition Party	Edwin Scrymgeour	1	0.2%	25,753	0.1%
Independent Liberal	—N/a	1	0.2%	12,469	0.1%
Irish Nationalist	T. P. O'Connor	1	0.2%	10,322	0.1%
Christian Pacifist	—N/a	1	0.2%	570	0.0%

=== Full Results ===

Results of the December 1923 general election to the House of Commons of the United Kingdom
Party	Leader	Candidates	MPs					Aggregate votes		
Party	Leader	Candidates	Total	Gains	Losses	Net	Of total (%)	Total	Of total (%) (Note: Adjusted for multi-member constituencies.)	Change (%)
Conservative (Note: Figure includes the Unionist Party and the Ulster Unionist Party under their nation affiliations with the Conservative Party.)	Stanley; Baldwin	536	258	23	109	▼86	42.0	5,514,541	38.0	▼0.5
Labour (Total)	Ramsay; MacDonald	427	191	64	15	▲49	31.1	4,439,780	30.7	▲1.0
Labour	Ramsay; MacDonald	417	185	62	15	▲47	30.1	4,331,856	29.9	▲1.1
Co-operative Party	—N/a	10	6	2	0	▲2	1.0	107,924	0.8	▼0.1
Liberal (Note: Figures are in comparison to the combined Liberal Party and National Liberal Party in 1922, due to the parties having reunited prior to this election.)	H. H. Asquith	457	158	82	39	▲43	25.7	4,301,481	29.7	▲1.1
Nationalist	Joseph; Devlin	2	2	0	0	Steady	0.3	87,671	0.3	Steady
Communist	Albert; Inkpin	4	0	0	1	▼1	—	39,448	0.2	Steady
Independent	—N/a	4	2	0	1	▼1	0.3	31,282	0.3	▼0.7
Scottish; Prohibition	Edwin Scrymgeour	1	1	0	0	Steady	0.2	25,753	0.1	Steady
Belfast Labour	David Robb Campbell	1	0	Did not stand in 1922			—	22,255	0.2	—N/a
Independent; Liberal	—N/a	3	1	1	1	Steady	0.2	16,184	0.1	Steady
Constitutionalist	—N/a	1	0	0	1	▼1	—	15,500	0.1	Steady
Independent; Unionist	—N/a	1	0	0	0	Steady	—	15,171	0.1	Steady
Independent; Labour	—N/a	3	0	0	1	▼1	—	10,872	0.1	Steady
Irish; Nationalist	T. P. O'Connor	2	1	0	0	Steady	0.2	10,322	0.1	Steady
Independent; Conservative	—N/a	1	0	0	3	▼3	—	9,772	0.1	▼0.6
Miners' Reform Union	James; Cook	1	0	Did not stand in 1922			—	6,459	0.0	—N/a
Free; Trade	—N/a	1	0	New			—	634	0.0	New
Christian; Pacifist	—N/a	1	1	New		▲1	0.2	570	0.0	New
Total		1,446	615			0	100.0	14,547,695	100.0	0.0
Registered voters, and turnout								21,283,061 (Note: Including the electorate in uncontested constituencies.)	71.1 (Note: Adjusted for multi-member constituencies.)	▼1.9

=== Votes summary ===
Popular vote
Conservative	38.0%
Labour	30.7%
Liberal	29.7%
Others	1.6%

=== Seats summary ===
Parliamentary seats
Conservative	42.0%
Labour	31.1%
Liberal	25.7%
Others	1.4%

=== Votes and seats by country ===
==== England ====
Popular vote in England
Conservative	39.8%
Liberal	29.9%
Labour	29.7%
Others	0.6%

Parliamentary seats in England
Conservative	45.6%
Labour	28.5%
Liberal	25.4%
Others	0.6%

==== Scotland ====
Popular vote in Scotland
Labour	35.9%
Conservative	31.6%
Liberal	28.4%
Others	4.1%

Parliamentary seats in Scotland
Labour	47.9%
Liberal	31.0%
Conservative	19.7%
Others	1.4%

==== Wales ====
Popular vote in Wales
Labour	42.0%
Liberal	35.4%
Conservative	21.1%
Others	1.5%

Parliamentary seats in Wales
Labour	54.3%
Liberal	31.4%
Conservative	11.4%

==== Northern Ireland ====
Popular vote in Northern Ireland
Ulster Unionist	49.4%
Nationalist	27.3%
Others	23.2%

Parliamentary seats in Northern Ireland
Ulster Unionist	75.0%
Nationalist	12.5%
Others	12.5%

== Transfers of seats ==
- All comparisons are with the 1922 election.
  - In some cases the change is due to the MP defecting to the gaining party. Such circumstances are marked with a *.
  - In other circumstances the change is due to the seat having been won by the gaining party in a by-election in the intervening years, and then retained in 1923. Such circumstances are marked with a †.

From	To	No.	Seats
Communist	Liberal	1	Battersea North
Communist	Conservative	1	Motherwell
Labour	Labour (HOLD)	125	Aberdeen North, Ayrshire South, Bishop Auckland, Chester-le-Street, Derby (one of two), Dundee (one of two), Edinburgh Central, Fife West, Govan, Hamilton, Houghton-le-Spring, Workington, Plaistow, Forest of Dean, Burnley, Nelson and Colne, Preston (one of two), Ince, Platting, Westhoughton, Wigan, Salford North, Newton, St Helens, Holland with Boston, Deptford, Woolwich East, Morpeth, Broxtowe, Nottingham West, Kingswinford, Leek, Smethwick, Wednesbury, West Bromwich, Hemsworth, Leeds South East, Normanton, Rother Valley, Rothwell, Wentworth, Abertillery, Bedwellty, Ebbw Vale, Pontypool, Caerphilly, Gower, Ogmore, Rhondda East, Rhondda West, Glasgow Gorbals, Manchester Gorton, Cannock, East Ham South, Walthamstow West, Leicester West, Wallsend, Hanley, Bradford East, Don Valley, Aberdare, Silvertown, Midlothian South & Peebles, Derbyshire North East, Spennymoor, Seaham, Consett, Leigh, Whitechapel and St George's, Wansbeck, Newcastle-under-Lyme, Dunfermline Burghs, Renfrewshire East, Renfrewshire West, Rutherglen, Dumbarton Burghs, Glasgow Bridgeton, Crewe, Clay Cross, Ilkeston, Blaydon, Jarrow, Poplar South, Stepney Limehouse, Pontefract, Sheffield Hillsborough, Sheffield Attercliffe, Sheffield Brightside, Leeds South, Doncaster, Barnsley, Batley and Morley, Colne Valley, Wrexham, Llanelli, Aberavon, Merthyr, Neath, Swansea East, Norfolk North, Clackmannan and Eastern Stirlingshire, Stirlingshire West, Lanarkshire North, Glasgow Maryhill, Glasgow Camlachie, Bothwell†, Coatbridge, Glasgow Springburn, Glasgow Tradeston, Glasgow St Rollox, Glasgow Shettleston, Linlithgow, Durham, Stratford, Eccles, Farnworth, Manchester Ardwick, Oldham (one of two), Bow and Bromley, Camberwell North, Edmonton, Tottenham North, Newcastle upon Tyne Central, Bradford Central, Pontypridd†
Labour	Liberal	12	Accrington, Bermondsey West, Burslem, Carnarvonshire, Dewsbury, Elland, Gateshead, Keighley, Newcastle upon Tyne East, Newcastle upon Tyne West, Rochdale, Stirling and Falkirk
Labour	Conservative	2	Cathcart, Sedgefield
Independent Labour	Liberal	1	Anglesey†
Constitutionalist	Labour	1	Dartford
Independent	Labour	1	Norwich (one of two)
Scottish Prohibition	Scottish Prohibition	1	Dundee (one of two)
Nationalist	Nationalist	2	Fermanagh and Tyrone (both seats)
Irish Nationalist	Irish Nationalist	1	Liverpool Scotland
Liberal	Labour	5	Bethnal Green North East, Derby (one of two), Huddersfield, Leeds West, Mansfield
Liberal	Liberal (HOLD)	45	Greenock, Paisley, Leith, Edinburgh East, Chesterfield, Kingston upon Hull South West, Lambeth North, Wolverhampton East, Middlesbrough West, Penistone, Merionethshire, Montgomeryshire, Orkney and Shetland, East Aberdeenshire & Kincardineshire, Galloway, South Molton, South Shields, Spen Valley, Combined Scottish Universities (one of three), Aberdeen and Kincardine Central†, Forfarshire, Fife East, Edinburgh West, Dumfriesshire, Bedfordshire Mid, Birkenhead East, Tavistock, Dorset North, The Hartlepools, Harwich, Isle of Wight, Kingston upon Hull Central, Preston (one of two), Bootle, Horncastle, Bethnal Green South West, Great Yarmouth, Nottingham Central, Oxford, Taunton, Chippenham, Westbury, Bradford South, Louth, Walsall
Liberal	Conservative	7	Aberdeenshire West and Kincardine, Penrith and Cockermouth, Belper, Derbyshire West, Worcester, Holderness, Grantham
National Liberal	Labour	17	Kirkcaldy Burghs, Glasgow Partick, Kilmarnock, Berwick & Haddington, Bristol East, Bristol North, Bolton (one of two), Leicester East, Shoreditch, Southwark North, Southwark South East, Norwich (one of two), Northampton, Wellingborough, Lichfield, Shipley, Swansea West
National Liberal	Liberal	27	Caithness and Sutherland*, Inverness*, Ross and Cromarty*, Western Isles, Banff*, Montrose Burghs*, Argyll*, Stockport (one of two), Cornwall North*, Stockton-on-Tees, Bristol South*, Blackburn (one of two), Heywood and Radcliffe*, Oldham (one of two)*, Stretford, Camberwell North West*, Hackney Central, Southwark Central*, Stoke*, Denbigh, Flintshire*, Carmarthen, Pembrokeshire*, Carnarvon*, Brecon and Radnor*, Combined English Universities (one of two)*, Camborne
National Liberal	Independent Liberal	1	Cardiganshire
National Liberal	Christian Pacifist	1	University of Wales
National Liberal	Conservative	6	Moray and Nairn, Kinross and West Perthshire, Romford, Middleton & Prestwich, Sheffield Park, Norfolk South West
Independent Liberal	Conservative	2	Eye, Cambridge University (one of two)
Independent	Independent	2	Mossley, Harrow
Speaker	Speaker	1	Halifax
Conservative	Labour	40	Dunbartonshire, Lanark, Midlothian and Peebles North, Reading, Birkenhead West, Barnard Castle, Leyton East, East Ham North, Essex SE, Maldon, Upton, Gravesend, Manchester Clayton, Salford South, Salford West, Warrington, Liverpool Edge Hill†, Greenwich, Kennington, Hammersmith North, Finsbury, Hackney South, Islington South, Islington West, Stepney Mile End, Rotherhithe, St Pancras North, St Pancras South East, Norfolk South, Kettering, The Wrekin, Frome, Ipswich, Coventry, Enfield, Tottenham South, Willesden West, Wakefield, Rotherham, Cardiff South
Conservative	Liberal	69	Perth, Edinburgh North, Luton, Abingdon, Newbury, Aylesbury, Wycombe, Huntingdonshire, Isle of Ely, Altrincham, Stalybridge and Hyde, Wirral, Penryn and Falmouth, St Ives, Barnstaple, Plymouth Devonport, Tiverton, Torquay, Totnes, Chelmsford, Stroud, Thornbury, Basingstoke, Portsmouth Central, Hemel Hempstead, Sevenoaks, Blackpool, Darwen, Lancaster, Lonsdale, Manchester Blackley, Manchester Exchange, Manchester Moss Side, Manchester Rusholme, Manchester Withington, Royton, Liverpool Wavertree, Liverpool West Derby, Southport, Bosworth, Harborough, Leicester South, Gainsborough, Hackney North, Brixton, Islington East, Stoke Newington, King's Lynn, Norfolk East, Hexham, Nottingham East, Shrewsbury, Bath, Bridgwater, Wells, Weston-super-Mare, Sudbury, Chichester, Nuneaton, Rugby, Finchley, Willesden East†, Devizes, Salisbury, Cleveland, Middlesbrough East, Bradford North, Sowerby, Cardiff East
Conservative	Conservative (HOLD)	226	Cambridge University (one of two), Combined English Universities (one of two), Oxford University (both seats), London University, Combined Scottish Universities (two of three), Aberdeen South, Ayr Burghs, Ayrshire N & Bute, Glasgow Central, Hillhead, Pollok, Kelvingrove, Edinburgh South, Windsor, Buckingham, Cambridge, Chester, Eddisbury, Knutsford, Macclesfield, Northwich, Wallasey, Cumberland North, Westmorland, High Peak, Exeter, Honiton, Plymouth Drake, Plymouth Sutton, South Dorset, Dorset West, Darlington, Sunderland (both seats), Colchester, Epping, Ilford, Leyton West, Southend, Walthamstow E, Bristol Central, Bristol West, Cheltenham, Cirencester and Tewkesbury, Gloucester, Aldershot, Fareham, New Forest & Christchurch, Petersfield, Portsmouth North, Portsmouth South, Winchester, Hereford, Leominster, Bewdley, Dudley, Evesham, Kidderminster, Hitchin, St Albans, Watford, Ealing, Hornsey, Twickenham, Wood Green, Brentford and Chiswick, Hendon, Spelthorne, Uxbridge, Acton, Howdenshire, Kingston upon Hull East, Kingston upon Hull North West, Ashford, Bromley, Canterbury, Chatham, Chislehurst, Dover, Faversham, Gillingham, Hythe, Isle of Thanet, Maidstone, Tonbridge, Barrow in Furness, Blackburn (one of two), Chorley, Fylde, Rossendale, Ashton-under-Lyne, Bury, Hulme, E Toxteth, Everton, Liverpool Exchange, Fairfield, Kirkdale, Walton, West Toxteth, Waterloo, Widnes, Melton, Brigg, Grimsby, Lincoln, Rutland and Stamford, Balham and Tooting, Chelsea, Clapham, Dulwich, Fulham East, Hampstead, Holborn, Lewisham East, Lewisham West, Kensington South, Fulham West, Hammersmith South, Islington North, Kensington North, Battersea South, City of London (both seats), Norwood, Paddington North, Paddington South, Putney, St Marylebone, St Pancras South West, Streatham, Wandsworth Central, Westminster Abbey, Woolwich West, Daventry, Peterborough, Newcastle upon Tyne North, Tynemouth, Bassetlaw, Nottingham South, Rushcliffe, Newark, Henley, Ludlow, Oswestry, Yeovil, Burton, Stafford, Stone, Tamworth, Bilston, Wolverhampton West, Bury St Edmunds, Woodbridge, Chertsey, Croydon North, Croydon South, Epsom, Farnham, Guildford, Kingston upon Thames, Mitcham, Reigate, Surrey East, Wimbledon, Brighton (both seats), East Grinstead, Eastbourne, Hastings, Horsham and Worthing, Lewes, Rye, Aston, Deritend, Erdington, King's Norton, Ladywood, Yardley, Sparkbrook, Birmingham West, Edgbaston, Handsworth, Moseley, Warwick and Leamington, Swindon, York, Richmond (Yorks), Scarborough and Whitby, Thirsk and Malton, Barkston Ash, Ripon, Ecclesall, Hallam, Skipton, Leeds North East, Sheffield Central, Monmouth, Llandaff & Barry, Cardiff C, Bournemouth, Hertford, Bedford, Cambridgeshire, Derbyshire South, Southampton (both seats), Buckrose, Peckham, Banbury, Lowestoft, Pudsey and Otley, Leeds North, Leeds Central, Newport (Monmouthshire), Bodmin, Saffron Walden, Stourbridge, Berwick-upon-Tweed, Birmingham Duddeston, Stockport (one of two), Clitheroe, Ormskirk, Bolton (one of two)
Ind. Conservative	Conservative	3	Westminster St George's, Richmond (Surrey)*, Dorset East
UUP	UUP	11	Antrim (both seats), Armagh, Belfast East, Belfast North, Belfast South, Belfast West, Down (both seats), Londonderry, Queen's University of Belfast

== See also ==
- List of MPs elected in the 1923 United Kingdom general election
- 1923 United Kingdom general election in England
- 1923 United Kingdom general election in Scotland
- 1923 United Kingdom general election in Wales
- 1923 United Kingdom general election in Northern Ireland
- 2019 United Kingdom general election, the next UK general election after 1923 to be held in December.
