= Rúaidhrí de Valera =

Irish archaeologist (1916–1978)

- Born: 3 November 1916; Dublin, Ireland
- Died: 28 October 1978 (aged 61); Enniskillen, Northern Ireland
- Resting place: Glasnevin Cemetery, Dublin, Ireland
- Education: University College Dublin
- Political party: Fianna Fáil
- Parents: Éamon de Valera; Sinéad de Valera
- Relatives: Catherine Coll (grandmother); Vivion de Valera (brother); Máirin de Valéra (sister)

Rúaidhrí de Valera (3 November 1916 – 28 October 1978) was an Irish archaeologist most known for his work on the megalithic tombs of his country. He was the son of Éamon de Valera and Sinéad de Valera.

== Early studies ==
De Valera took a Bachelor of Arts degree in Celtic studies from University College Dublin in 1939, before serving briefly in the Irish Army and then lecturing at the National University of Ireland at Maynooth for one year until 1943. He then studied for an MA in archaeology, writing his thesis on the prehistoric tombs of County Clare.

== Work ==
In 1947, de Valera became the Archaeological Officer for Ordnance Survey Ireland which permitted him to develop the Survey of the Megalithic Tombs of Ireland project. He went on to write significant papers on Irish prehistory which contributed to his doctorate, awarded in 1954.

In 1957, de Valera was appointed Chair of Celtic Archaeology at University College Dublin where he worked to enlarge the department whilst continuing to publish on Irish chamber tombs, especially the Court cairns which he proposed first developed in the west of the country.

De Valera later excavated at the Mound of the Hostages at Tara.

He died suddenly on 28 October 1978, while visiting the Fermanagh County Museum in Enniskillen, Northern Ireland.
