= John J. O'Kelly =

Irish politician, author and publisher (1872–1957)

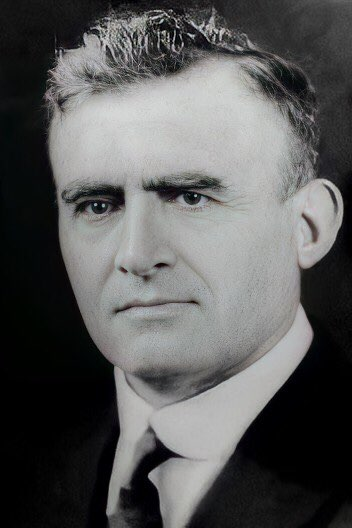
- O'Kelly in 1920

President of Sinn Féin
- In office 1 May 1926 – 30 April 1931
- Vice President: Mary MacSwiney
- Preceded by: Éamon de Valera
- Succeeded by: Brian O'Higgins

Minister for Education
- In office 26 August 1921 – 9 January 1922
- President: Éamon de Valera
- Preceded by: New office
- Succeeded by: Michael Hayes

Minister for Irish
- In office 29 June 1920 – 26 August 1921
- President: Éamon de Valera
- Preceded by: New office
- Succeeded by: Office abolished

Leas-Cheann Comhairle of Dáil Éireann
- In office 1 April 1919 – 26 August 1921
- Ceann Comhairle: Seán T. O'Kelly
- Preceded by: New office
- Succeeded by: Brian O'Higgins

Teachta Dála
- In office June 1922 – August 1923
- Constituency: Louth–Meath
- In office December 1918 – May 1921
- Constituency: County Louth

Personal details
- Born: John Joseph O'Kelly; 7 July 1872 Valentia Island, County Kerry, Ireland
- Died: 26 March 1957 (aged 84) Dublin, Ireland
- Party: Sinn Féin
- Spouse: Nora O'Sullivan (m. 1904)

John Joseph O'Kelly (Irish: Seán Ua Ceallaigh; known as Sceilg; 7 July 1872 – 26 March 1957) was an Irish republican politician, author and publisher who served as President of Sinn Féin from 1926 to 1931, Minister for Education from 1921 to 1922, Minister for Irish from 1920 to 1921 and Leas-Cheann Comhairle of Dáil Éireann from 1919 to 1921. He served as a Teachta Dála from 1918 to 1921 and 1922 to 1923.

== Early years ==
O'Kelly was born in Coramore, on Valentia Island off the County Kerry coast, he was the son of Patrick Kelly, a farmer, and Ellen Sullivan. While his birth date is recorded as 7 July 1872, his family gave it as 4 July.

== Political career ==
He joined Sinn Féin at its inaugural meeting on 5 November 1905. Following the 1916 Easter Rising, O'Kelly joined the Irish Nation League and became treasurer of the Irish National Aid and Volunteers' Dependants' Fund for the relief of prisoners and their families. In February 1917, he was arrested and deported to England where he was interned without trial for several months. On his release O'Kelly was elected to the Provisional Committee of the newly merged Irish Nation League and Sinn Féin, thereafter called Sinn Féin. He was appointed editor of the influential "Catholic Bulletin". In the 1918 general election he was elected as a Sinn Féin MP for Louth by 255 votes in what was the closest contest in Ireland in that election. The closeness of the contest was due to the strong AOH organisation in the county that campaigned for outgoing North Galway MP Richard Hazleton of the Irish Parliamentary Party.

O'Kelly took his seat in Dáil Éireann as a Sinn Féin TD and was Leas-Cheann Comhairle from 1919 to 1921. He was appointed Minister for Irish in the Government of the 2nd Dáil. This position that was expanded as the Minister for Education in the Government of the 2nd Dáil. From 1919 to 1923, he was President of the Gaelic League. He opposed the Anglo-Irish Treaty that was ratified by the Dáil in January 1922, and refused to accept the legitimacy of the Irish Free State established in December 1922. He and others maintained that the Irish Republic continued to exist and that the rump of the Second Dáil, composed of those anti-Treaty TDs who had refused to take their seats in what became the Free State parliament, was the only legitimate government for the whole of Ireland. In June 1922, he was elected to the 3rd Dáil for Louth-Meath but abstained from taking his seat. In August 1923, standing as a Republican for Meath, he was defeated for a seat in the 4th Dáil. He was again defeated in the 1925 Roscommon by-election, his last election attempt. After the resignation of Éamon de Valera as president of Sinn Féin in 1926, O'Kelly, who maintained an abstentionist policy towards Dáil Éireann, was elected in his place and remained in this position until 1931 when Brian O'Higgins took over the leadership.

O'Kelly was hostile towards the 1937 Constitution of Ireland, claiming it was insufficiently supportive of Irish Republicanism and was critical that it did not require the President of Ireland to be of Irish birth.

Sceilg was unusual among Irish Republicans in that he regarded Daniel O'Connell and T.M. Healy as political heroes. This apparently reflected local patriotism (both men came from south-western Ireland near to Sceilg's own birthplace) and Sceilg's own devout Catholicism, which led him to exalt O'Connell's achievement of Catholic Emancipation and Healy's claims that the adultery of Charles Stewart Parnell with Katharine O'Shea made Parnell unfit for political leadership. Sceilg was also explicitly hostile to the Spanish Republic declared in 1931, believing it to be anti-Catholic and supported by pro-British Freemasons.

== Literary interests ==
He was a prolific author on Irish language and history topics, editing Banba, The Catholic Bulletin and An Camán. He was intensely religious and an active Catholic. O'Kelly opposed members of the IRA fighting against Franco in the Spanish Civil War. In 1938, he was one of seven remaining abstentionist Second Dáil TDs who transferred what they believed was their authority as the Government of the Irish Republic to the IRA Army Council (see Irish republican legitimatism).

In 1938, he visited Germany, later publishing his impressions in the Irish Independent.

== Anti-Semitism ==
Many of O'Kelly's speeches and writings contained content critical of Freemasons and Jews. In 1916, members of Ireland's Jewish community protested after the Catholic Bulletin published a series of articles by Fr. T.H. Burbage accusing the Jewish community of carrying out ritual murders; O'Kelly refused to apologise for the articles. O'Kelly also featured the anti-semitic writings of Denis Fahey in the Bulletin.

In 1930, O'Kelly, speaking as Sinn Féin President to its members, said, "In the signs of the Anti-Christ, England is today the prey of rival groups of unscrupulous Jews fighting for their lands."

In 1939 O'Kelly spoke at Cork City Hall and praised Nazi Germany's treatment of Jews, saying: "England's difficulty is Ireland's opportunity...its seems to me that England prefers to plant the Jews in Ireland, as she planted the Cromwellians, The Orangemen...How many people in Ireland reflect that the Treaty of Versailles placed Germany...with the heel of Jews on her neck...while Jewish usury emaciated and the Jewish White Slave Trade sought to corrupt the whole land".

== Death ==
O'Kelly died in Our Lady's Hospice, Harold's Cross, on 26 March 1957, and was buried in Glasnevin Cemetery on 28 March.

== Bibliography ==
- Cathal Brugha, 1942
- Taistealuidheacht, nó Cúrsa na Cruinne ("Travelling, or A World Tour"), 1931
- Spelling Made Easy, 1946
- A Trinity of Martyrs (biographies of Terence McSwiney, Cathal Brugha and Austin Stack), 1947
- Ireland's Spiritual Empire: Saint Patrick as a World Figure, 1952

Parliament of the United Kingdom
New constituency	Member of Parliament for County Louth; 1918–1922	Constituency abolished
Oireachtas
New constituency	Teachta Dála for County Louth; 1918–1921	Constituency abolished
Political offices
New office	Secretary for Education; 1921–1922	Succeeded by Michael Hayes
Party political offices
Preceded by Éamon de Valera	President of Sinn Féin; 1926–1931	Succeeded by Brian O'Higgins

Dáil	Election	Deputy (Party)	Deputy (Party)	Deputy (Party)	Deputy (Party)	Deputy (Party)
2nd	1921	Justin McKenna (SF)	Eamonn Duggan (SF)	Peter Hughes (SF)	James Murphy (SF)	John J. O'Kelly (SF)
3rd	1922	Cathal O'Shannon (Lab)	Eamonn Duggan (PT-SF)	Peter Hughes (PT-SF)	James Murphy (PT-SF)	John J. O'Kelly (AT-SF)
4th	1923	Constituency abolished. See Louth and Meath				
