= Máire Delaney =

Irish doctor

Máire Delaney (née de Valera, 1945–2002) was an Irish medical doctor in the fields of psychiatry, anatomy and pathology. She was best known for her research on 'bog bodies'.

== Biography ==
She was born in Dublin in 1945. Her mother was from Carndonagh on the County Donegal coast. Her father, Eamon de Valera, Jnr, was a professor and consultant gynaecologist at the National Maternity Hospital, Dublin. Her grandfather was Éamon de Valera, was President of Ireland. She was educated at St Louis High School, Rathmines, a convent school, and University College Dublin (UCD) where she qualified as a medical doctor in 1971.

She married Tom Delaney, an archaeologist specialising in the mediaeval period, and moved to Belfast where he worked at the Ulster Museum. She trained in psychiatry and also reported on archaeological anatomy and pathology. When her husband died, she returned to Dublin with their two daughters, finally settling in the village of Ballyboughal. She got remarried, to Pat O'Connell. After working as a psychiatric registrar, her interest in archaeology led her to teaching at UCD followed by a lectureship in anatomy at Trinity College. In her research, she engaged the assistance of many experts worldwide to understand the chemistry of tissue preservation in bog people. In 1999, she and her archaeologist colleague, Nóra Bermingham, began studying a bog body found in Offaly. She was co-author, with Bermingham, of The bog body from Tumbeagh (Wordwell, 2005). The novelist, Erin Hart, based the pathologist character Nora Gavin from her book False Mermaid on Delaney after interviewing her.

Throughout her life, she had been eagerly involved in amateur drama. She was well known for her singing and was a supporter of traditional dance and music; along with her second husband, she was a member of the Góilín Club in Dublin. After some months of illness, she died and her funeral was held in Ballyboughal.

Delaney was one of 14 Irish women scientists celebrated on International Women's Day in 2016.
