= Éamon de Valera Forest =

Forest near Nazareth, Israel

Éamon de Valera Forest (Hebrew: יער איימון דה ואלירה) is a forest in Israel, near Nazareth. It was planted in 1966 and named after American-born Irish politician and statesman Éamon de Valera.

== History ==
The planting and dedication of the forest was arranged by the Dublin Jewish community, in recognition of de Valera's consistent support for Ireland's Jews. In the 1937 Constitution of Ireland, the drafting of which was personally supervised by de Valera, Jews were specifically given constitutional protection. This was considered to be a necessary component to the constitution by de Valera because of the treatment of Jews elsewhere in Europe at the time.

In 1948 de Valera overruled the Department of Justice when it barred 150 Jewish children from travelling to Ireland as refugees.

During its dedication to de Valera, Israeli Prime Minister Levi Eshkol read out loud a message to honour the occasion and Ireland-Israel relations in general, saying that the Jews and Irish both "have so much in common."

== See also ==
- History of the Jews in Ireland
