= Sinéad de Valera =

Irish author (1878–1975)

- Born: Jane O'Flanagan; 3 June 1878; Balbriggan, County Dublin, Ireland
- Died: 7 January 1975 (aged 96); Santry, Dublin
- Resting place: Glasnevin Cemetery, Dublin
- Education: University College Dublin
- Spouse: Éamon de Valera (m. 1910)
- Children: 7; including Vivion, Máirín, Éamon and Rúaidhrí
- Relatives: Síle de Valera (granddaughter); Éamon Ó Cuív (grandson)

Sinéad de Valera (née Ní Fhlannagáin; 3 June 1878 – 7 January 1975) was an Irish author of a number of children's books in both Irish and English. She was married to Taoiseach and third president of Ireland, Éamon de Valera.

== Background ==
She was born Jane O'Flanagan in Balbriggan, County Dublin. Her father, Laurence, was a carpenter and was a native of Kildare who moved to Balbriggan and married a local girl, Margaret Byrne. The couple emigrated to New York City, where their daughter Mary was born in 1871. The family returned to Balbriggan in 1873, and Sinéad was born there in 1878. She trained as a teacher and worked first in Edenderry, before taking up a post at a national school in Dorset Street, Dublin in around 1901. The 1901 census records her as 'Jane Flanagan', living with her parents and three siblings at 6 Richmond Cottages in Dublin.

== Marriage and children ==
In her spare time, she taught Irish at the Leinster College of the Gaelic League in Parnell Square. One of her Irish students was Éamon de Valera, then a teacher of mathematics. On 8 January 1910, they were married. Together they had five sons, Vivion, Éamon, Brian, Rúaidhrí and Terence (Terry), and two daughters, Máirín and Emer. On 9 February 1936, Brian, then aged twenty, was killed in a riding accident in the Phoenix Park.

Due to a combination of his imprisonment, political activities, and fundraising tours of the United States, the family saw relatively little of Éamon de Valera in the 1916 to 1923 period. He was also away from home frequently during the early years of his political career. Sinéad de Valera played little or no public role during her husband's fifty years in public life.

== Literary output ==
Sinéad de Valera wrote thirty-one books for children, in both English and Irish. Among her works were plays such as Cluichidhe na Gaedhilge (1935) and story collections such as The Emerald Ring and Other Irish Fairy Stories (1951), The Stolen Child and Other Stories (1961), The Four-leafed Shamrock (1964) and The Miser's Gold (1970).

== Spouse of president ==
Her husband was inaugurated as President of Ireland on 25 June 1959, two days after retiring as Taoiseach. They immediately took up residence at Áras an Uachtaráin. She remained unconvinced about her new role but conceded that "she should be happy if only for [her husband's] sake".

== Death ==
Sinéad de Valera died on 7 January 1975, at the age of 96, the day before what would have been the de Valeras' sixty-fifth wedding anniversary. Éamon de Valera died just under eight months later, on 29 August 1975, aged 92. The couple are buried together, along with their son Brian, at Dublin's Glasnevin Cemetery.
