= Cumann na Poblachta =

Irish republican political party

- Leader: Éamon de Valera
- Founded: 15 March 1922
- Dissolved: 1923
- Split from: Sinn Féin
- Merged into: Sinn Féin
- Ideology: Anti-Treaty
- National affiliation: Sinn Féin

Cumann na Poblachta (Irish pronunciation: [ˈkʊmˠən̪ˠ n̪ˠə ˈpˠɔbˠlˠəxt̪ˠə]; "Society of the Republic") was an Irish republican political party.

The party was founded on 15 March 1922 by Éamon de Valera. It opposed the Anglo-Irish Treaty and was composed of the anti-Treaty wing of Sinn Féin. The party did contest the 1922 Irish general election but, in accordance with the Collins/De Valera Pact, under the Sinn Féin banner like their opponents.

The party commonly appended the title The Republican Party to its name. This subtitle was later adopted by the Fianna Fáil party at its foundation in 1926, also led by de Valera.

Its headquarters was at 23 Suffolk Street. The party's offices served as a meeting place for the Anti-treaty IRA.

In 1923, after the pro-Treaty wing of Sinn Féin renamed itself as Cumann na nGaedheal, Cumann na Poblachta continued to use the Sinn Féin name.
