= Éamon de Valera (1913–1986) =

Irish obstetrician and gynaecologist (1913–1986)

Éamon de Valera Jnr. (11 October 1913 – 9 December 1986) was an Irish obstetrician and gynaecologist. In 2021, RTÉ Investigates revealed that he had illegally and covertly transferred children from mothers in Magdalene asylums to childless couples.

== Biography ==
=== Early life and education ===
Éamon was the third child of Sinéad (née Flanagan) and Éamon de Valera. His mother and father were school teachers. His father became an Irish revolutionary leader, Taoiseach and President of Ireland. As a young man, de Valera Jr. was strongly influenced by his father's close friend, Dr. Robert Farnan, a noted, wealthy gynaecologist and founder member of Fianna Fáil, who had sheltered his father when he was sought by the British authorities. Farnan mentored him and de Valera Jr. felt indebted to him thereafter. He attended the Christian Brothers primary school in Westland Row, Dublin, Presentation College, Bray, Blackrock College, and finally University College Dublin (UCD) where, in 1936, he gained a first-class honours degree. In 1944, he qualified as a doctor; in 1947, he was admitted to the Royal College of Physicians of Ireland.

=== Marriage and academic posts ===
Eamon married Sarah O'Doherty, from Carndonagh, County Donegal, in April 1941. They had two children, Éamon (1944) and Máire (1945). He worked at St.Luke's Hospital, the National Maternity Hospital, James Connolly Memorial Hospital and the Mater Hospital. He became Professor of Obstetrics and Gynaecology at UCD in 1960. He was a guest lecturer in the US and Canada. In 1970, he was elected to the Royal College of Obstetricians and Gynaecologists, London, and shortly afterwards was made a Fellow of the American College of Surgeons. He retired from UCD 1983 but continued as a consultant gynaecologist with the Mater Hospital. He was described as an outstanding academic and gynaecological surgeon.

=== RTÉ Investigates ===
In March 2021, the national Irish broadcaster, RTÉ, revealed in their programme RTÉ Investigates that de Valera Jr. was involved in the illegal provision of babies to childless couples over a few decades. He forged paperwork to facilitate these adoptions, organised bogus antenatal appointments for women who were not pregnant and the children's birth details were changed, resulting in falsified birth certificates. The babies came typically from young unmarried women who were socially stigmatised after becoming pregnant and sent to religious asylums; the babies were taken from them after birth.

=== Pastimes and death ===
In his private life, de Valera enjoyed fishing, tennis, music and nature. He died aged 73, survived by his wife and children.
