= Éamon de Valera =

Irish statesman (1882–1975)

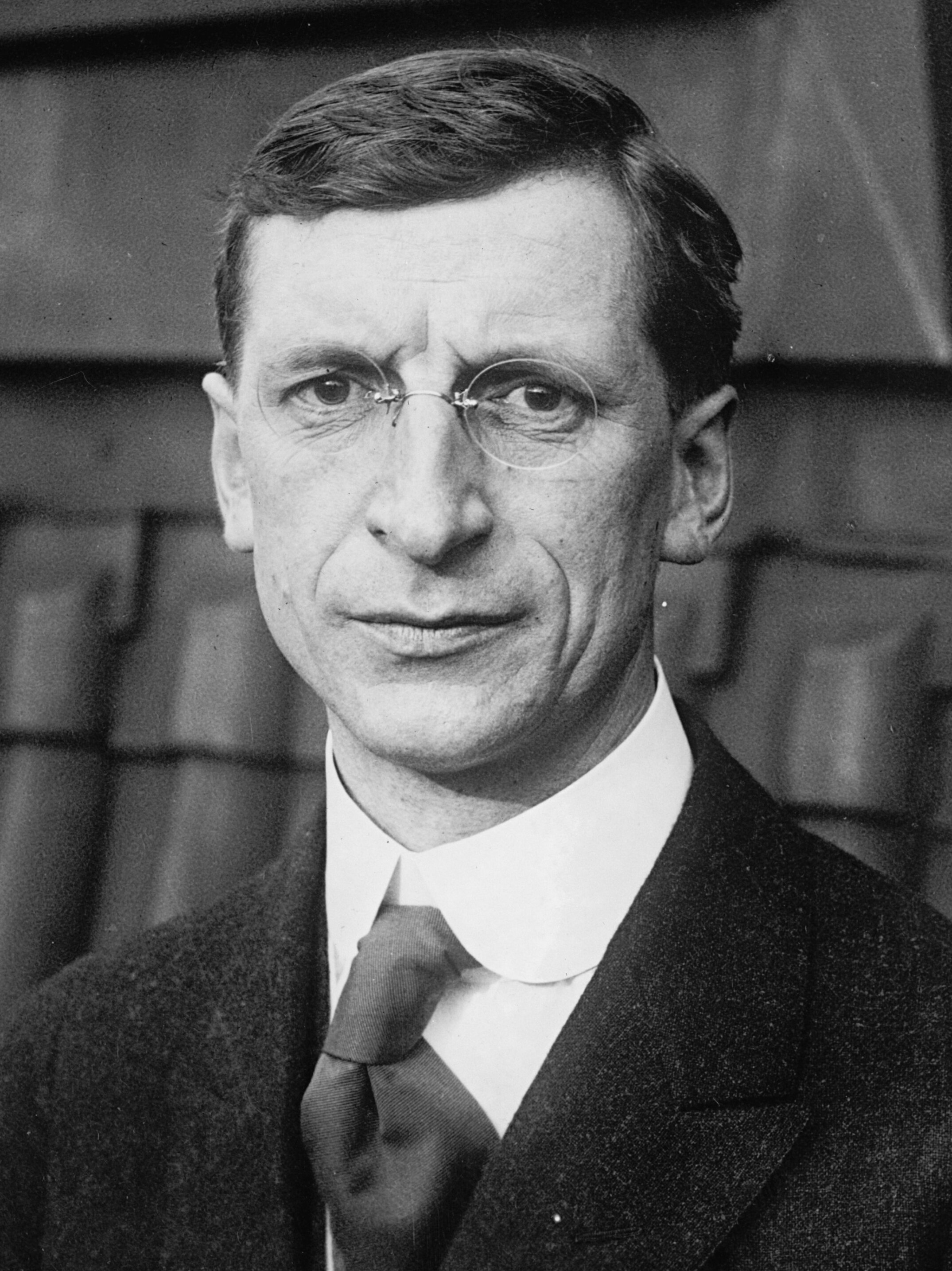
- Portrait, c. 1918–1921

President of Ireland
- In office 25 June 1959 – 24 June 1973
- Taoiseach: Seán Lemass; Jack Lynch; Liam Cosgrave
- Preceded by: Seán T. O'Kelly
- Succeeded by: Erskine H. Childers

Taoiseach
- In office 20 March 1957 – 23 June 1959
- President: Seán T. O'Kelly
- Tánaiste: Seán Lemass
- Preceded by: John A. Costello
- Succeeded by: Seán Lemass
- In office 13 June 1951 – 2 June 1954
- President: Seán T. O'Kelly
- Tánaiste: Seán Lemass
- Preceded by: John A. Costello
- Succeeded by: John A. Costello
- In office 29 December 1937 – 18 February 1948
- President: Douglas Hyde; Seán T. O'Kelly
- Tánaiste: Seán T. O'Kelly; Seán Lemass
- Preceded by: Himself (as President of the Executive Council)
- Succeeded by: John A. Costello

President of the Executive Council
- In office 9 March 1932 – 29 December 1937
- Governors-General: James McNeill; Domhnall Ua Buachalla
- Vice President: Seán T. O'Kelly
- Preceded by: W. T. Cosgrave
- Succeeded by: Himself (as Taoiseach)
Other offices held
Leader of the Opposition
In office 2 June 1954 – 20 March 1957
Taoiseach	John A. Costello
Preceded by	John A. Costello
Succeeded by	John A. Costello
In office 18 February 1948 – 13 June 1951
Taoiseach	John A. Costello
Preceded by	Richard Mulcahy
Succeeded by	John A. Costello
In office 11 August 1927 – 9 March 1932
Taoiseach	W. T. Cosgrave (Note: as President of the Executive Council of the Irish Free State)
Preceded by	Thomas Johnson
Succeeded by	W. T. Cosgrave
Leader of Fianna Fáil
In office 23 March 1926 – 23 June 1959
Preceded by	Office established
Succeeded by	Seán Lemass
President of the Irish Republic
In office 26 August 1921 – 9 January 1922
Preceded by	Himself (as President of Dáil Éireann)
Succeeded by	Arthur Griffith (as President of Dáil Éireann)
President of Dáil Éireann
In office 1 April 1919 – 26 August 1921
Preceded by	Cathal Brugha
Succeeded by	Himself (as President of the Irish Republic)
President of Sinn Féin
In office 25 October 1917 – 10 March 1926
Vice President	Michael O'Flanagan; Arthur Griffith; Kathleen Lynn; P. J. Ruttledge
Preceded by	Arthur Griffith
Succeeded by	John J. O'Kelly
Teachta Dála
In office August 1922 – June 1959
Constituency	Clare
In office December 1918 – June 1922
Constituency	Clare East
Member of the Northern Ireland Parliament for South Down
In office 30 November 1933 – 9 February 1938
Preceded by	John Henry Collins
Succeeded by	James Brown
Member of the Northern Ireland Parliament for Down
In office 24 May 1921 – 22 May 1929
Preceded by	Constituency established
Succeeded by	Constituency abolished
Member of Parliament for East Clare
In office 10 July 1917 – 15 November 1922
Preceded by	Willie Redmond
Succeeded by	Constituency abolished

Personal details
- Born: George de Valero; 14 October 1882 New York City, U.S.
- Died: 29 August 1975 (aged 92) Blackrock, Dublin, Ireland
- Resting place: Glasnevin Cemetery, Dublin, Ireland
- Citizenship: Ireland; United States
- Party: Fianna Fáil
- Other political affiliations: Anti-Treaty Sinn Féin (1923–1926); Cumann na Poblachta (1922–1923); Sinn Féin (1916–1922)
- Spouse: Sinéad Flanagan (m. 1910; died 1975)
- Children: 7, including Vivion, Máirín, Éamon and Rúaidhrí
- Parents: Juan Vivion de Valera (father); Catherine Coll (mother)
- Relatives: Éamon Ó Cuív (grandson); Síle de Valera (granddaughter)
- Education: Royal University of Ireland (BA); Trinity College Dublin (attended)
- Profession: Teacher; politician

Military service
- Allegiance: Irish Republic
- Branch/service: Irish Volunteers
- Years of service: 1913–1916
- Rank: Commandant
- Commands: Adjutant, Dublin Brigade, Irish Volunteers; Commander, 3rd Battalion, Dublin Brigade
- Battles/wars: Easter Rising
- Éamon de Valera's voice Éamon de Valera speaks on an ideal Ireland; Recorded 17 March 1943

Éamon de Valera (Note: Pronounced /ˈeɪmən ˌdɛvəˈlɛərə, -ˈlɪər-/ AY-mən DEH-və-LAIR-ə, -LEER-; Irish: [ˈeːmˠən̪ˠ dʲɛ ˈwalʲəɾʲə].; His name was first registered as George de Valero; it changed some time before 1901 to Edward de Valera and later to Éamon de Valera.; His name is frequently misspelt Eamonn De Valera, but he never used the second "n" in his first name (the standard Irish spelling), and he always used a small "d" in "de Valera", which is proper for Spanish names (de meaning "of").; Éamon(n) translates into English as "Edmond" or "Edmund". The correct Irish translation of "Edward" (his name as given in his amended birth certificate) is Éadhbhard.) (14 October 1882 – 29 August 1975) was an Irish statesman. He served as the president of Ireland from 1959 to 1973, and three terms as head of government. (Note: titled as President of the Executive Council of the Irish Free State from 1932 to 1937 and as Taoiseach from 1937 to 1948, 1951 to 1954, and 1957 to 1959) He had a leading role in introducing the Constitution of Ireland in 1937, and was a dominant figure in Irish political circles from the early 1930s to the late 1960s, when he served terms as both the head of government and head of state.

Born in New York City, de Valera was a Commandant of the Irish Volunteers (3rd Battalion) at Boland's Mill during the Easter Rising in 1916. He was arrested and sentenced to death, but released for a variety of reasons, including his American citizenship and the public response to the British execution of leaders of the Rising. He returned to Ireland after being jailed in England and became one of the leading political figures of the War of Independence. After the signing of the Anglo-Irish Treaty, de Valera served as the political leader of Anti-Treaty Sinn Féin until 1926, when he, along with many supporters, left the party to set up Fianna Fáil, a new political party – of which he became the founding leader – which abandoned the policy of abstentionism from Dáil Éireann in favour of working to republicanise the Irish Free State from within.

De Valera went on to be at the forefront of Irish politics until the turn of the 1960s. He took over as president of the Executive Council from W. T. Cosgrave in 1932 and later, with the adoption of the Constitution of Ireland in 1937, became Taoiseach. With a total of 21 years in office, he is the longest-serving Irish head of government by total days served in the post. He resigned in 1959 upon his election as President of Ireland. By then, he had led Fianna Fáil for 33 years and he, along with older founding members, began to take a less prominent role relative to newer ministers such as Jack Lynch, Charles Haughey and Neil Blaney. De Valera served as the head of state from 1959 to 1973, two full terms in office.

De Valera's political beliefs evolved from militant Irish republicanism to strong social, cultural and fiscal conservatism. He has been characterised as having a stern and unbending demeanour, and also a devious personality. His roles in the Civil War have also been interpreted as making him a divisive figure in Irish history. Biographer Tim Pat Coogan sees his time in power as being characterised by economic and cultural stagnation, while Diarmaid Ferriter argues that the stereotype of de Valera as an austere, cold, and even backward figure was largely manufactured in the 1960s and is misguided.

== Early life ==
Éamon de Valera was born on 14 October 1882 in New York City; his name was initially registered as George de Valero. He was the son of Catherine Coll, who was originally from Bruree, County Limerick, and Juan Vivion de Valera, described on the birth certificate as a Spanish artist born in 1853. Some researchers have placed his father's place of birth in Cuba, while others have suggested other locations; according to Antonio Rivero Taravillo, he was born in Seville, while Ronan Fanning has him born in the Basque Country.

=== Birth circumstances and name changes ===
He was born at the Nursery and Child's Hospital in Lenox Hill, Manhattan, a home for destitute orphans and abandoned children. His parents were reportedly married on 18 September 1881 at St Patrick's Church in Jersey City, New Jersey, but archivists have not located any marriage certificate or any birth, baptismal, or death certificate information for anyone called Juan Vivion de Valera (nor for "de Valeros", an alternative form). On de Valera's original birth certificate, his name is given as George de Valero and his father is listed as Vivion de Valero. Although he was known as Edward de Valera before 1901, an amended birth certificate was issued, when de Valera was an adult, in which his first name was updated to Edward and his father's surname given as "de Valera". As a child, he was known as "Eddie" or "Eddy". An article, published in 2024 in the Journal of the Westmeath Archaeological and History Society, suggested that de Valera's baptismal record and birth certificate were forged by Irish nationalists in New York City in 1916 as part of an effort to spare him from execution.

=== Rearing in Ireland ===
According to Coll, Juan Vivion died in 1885 leaving Coll and her child in poor circumstances. Éamon was taken to Ireland by his uncle Ned at the age of two. When his mother remarried in the mid-1880s, he was not brought back to live with her, but was reared by his grandmother, Elizabeth Coll, her son Patrick and her daughter Hannie, in Bruree, County Limerick. He was educated locally at Bruree National School, County Limerick, and C.B.S. Charleville, County Cork.

Aged sixteen, he won a scholarship. He was not successful in enrolling at two colleges in Limerick, but was accepted at Blackrock College, Dublin, at the instigation of his local curate. Blackrock College has since named one of their six student houses after him. He played rugby at Blackrock and Rockwell College, then for Munster around 1905. He remained a lifelong devotee of rugby, attending international matches even towards the end of his life when he was nearly blind.

At the end of his first year at Blackrock College, he was student of the year. He also won further scholarships and exhibitions in 1903.

== Teaching career ==
De Valera was appointed teacher of mathematics at Rockwell College, County Tipperary, and it was here that de Valera was first given the nickname "Dev" by a teaching colleague, Tom O'Donnell.

In 1904, he graduated with a bachelors degree in mathematics from the Royal University of Ireland. He then pursued graduate studies for a year at Trinity College Dublin but, owing to the necessity of earning a living, did not proceed further and returned to teaching, this time at Belvedere College. In 1906, he secured a post as a teacher of mathematics at Carysfort Teachers' Training College for women in Blackrock, Dublin. His applications for professorships in colleges of the National University of Ireland were unsuccessful, but he obtained a part-time appointment at St Patrick's College, Maynooth and also taught mathematics at various Dublin schools, including Castleknock College (1910–1911; under the name Edward de Valera) and Belvedere College.

His interest in mathematics and science continued later in life, and he was involved in the foundation of the Dublin Institute for Advanced Studies in 1940, to which he invited scientists such as Erwin Schrödinger. He also reportedly worked mathematical problems to pass the time while jailed and awaiting possible execution in 1916.

=== Religion and marriage ===
There were occasions when de Valera seriously contemplated the religious life like his half-brother, Fr. Thomas Wheelwright, but ultimately he did not pursue this vocation. As late as 1906, when he was 24 years old, he approached the President of Clonliffe Seminary in Dublin for advice on his vocation. De Valera was throughout his life portrayed as a deeply religious man, and asked to be buried in a religious habit. His biographer, Tim Pat Coogan, speculated that questions surrounding de Valera's legitimacy may have been a deciding factor in his not entering religious life. Being illegitimate would have ordinarily been a bar to receiving priestly orders as a secular priest, but not to becoming a priest or religious in some religious orders.

As a young Gaeilgeoir (Irish speaker), de Valera became an activist for the Irish language. In 1908, he joined the Árdchraobh of Conradh na Gaeilge (the Gaelic League), where he met Sinéad Flanagan, a teacher by profession and four years his senior. They were married on 8 January 1910 at St Paul's Church, Arran Quay, Dublin. The couple had five sons: Vivion, Éamon, Brian, Rúaidhrí, and Terence; and two daughters: Máirín and Emer. Brian de Valera predeceased his parents.

== Politics and revolution ==
=== Early political activity ===
While he was already involved in the Gaelic revival, de Valera's involvement in the political revolution began on 25 November 1913, when he joined the Irish Volunteers. The organisation was formed to oppose the Ulster Volunteers and ensure the enactment of the Irish Parliamentary Party's Third Home Rule Act won by its leader John Redmond. After the outbreak of World War I in August 1914, de Valera rose through the ranks and it was not long before he was elected captain of the Donnybrook branch. As preparations were pushed ahead for an armed revolt, and he was promoted to Commandant of the 3rd Battalion and appointed Adjutant of the Dublin Brigade. He took part in the Howth gun-running. He was sworn by Thomas MacDonagh into the oath-bound Irish Republican Brotherhood, which secretly controlled the central executive of the Volunteers. He opposed secret societies, but this was the only way he could be guaranteed full information on plans for the Rising.

=== 1916 Easter Rising ===
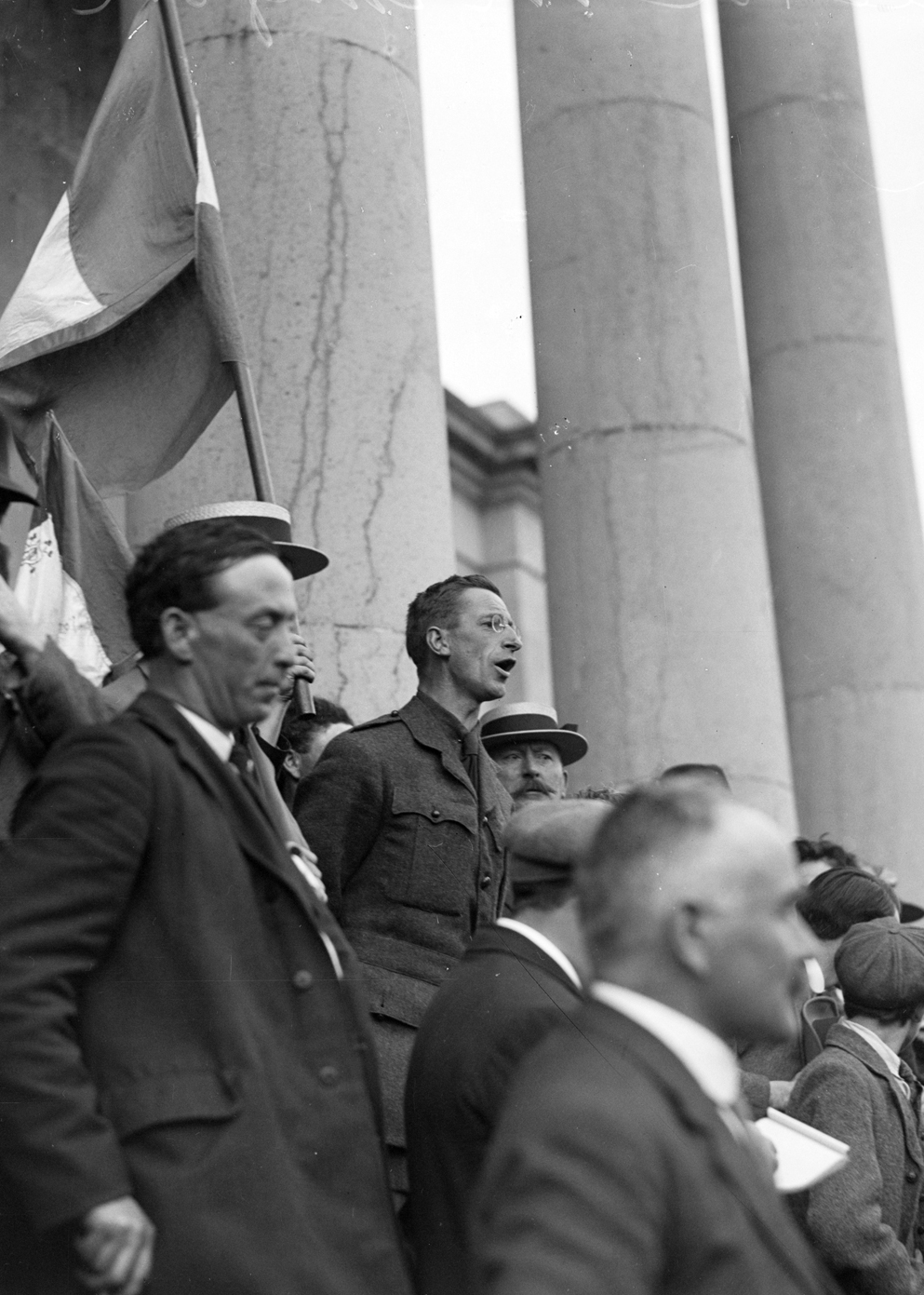
De Valera addressing a crowd on the steps of Ennis Courthouse, County Clare, in July 1917

On 24 April 1916, the Easter Rising began. Forces commanded by de Valera occupied Boland's Mill on Grand Canal Street in Dublin. His chief task was to cover the southeastern approaches to the city. After a week of fighting, the order came from Pádraig Pearse to surrender. De Valera was court-martialled, convicted, and sentenced to death, but the sentence was immediately commuted to penal servitude for life.

De Valera was one of a number of rebel leaders whose death sentences were commuted. It has been argued that his life was saved by four facts. First, he was one of the last to surrender and he was held in a different prison from other leaders, thus his execution was delayed by practicalities. Second, the US Consulate in Dublin made representations before his trial (i.e., was he actually a United States citizen and if so, how would the United States react to the execution of one of its citizens?) while the full legal and political situation was clarified. The UK was trying to bring the US into the war in Europe at the time, and the Irish American vote was important in US politics. Third, De Valera had no Fenian family or personal background and his MI5 file in 1916 was very slim, detailing only his open membership in the Irish Volunteers. Thus, when Lt-Gen Sir John Maxwell reviewed his case, he remarked: "Who is he? I haven't heard of him before. I wonder would he be likely to make trouble in the future?" On being told that de Valera was unimportant, he then commuted the court-martial's death sentence to life imprisonment. Fourth, by the time de Valera was court-martialled on 8 May, political pressure was being brought to bear on Maxwell to halt the executions; Maxwell had already told British Prime Minister H. H. Asquith that only two more were to be executed, Seán Mac Diarmada and James Connolly, although they were court-martialled the day after de Valera. His late trial, representations made by the American Consulate, his lack of Fenian background and political pressure all combined to save his life, though had he been tried a week earlier he would probably have been shot.

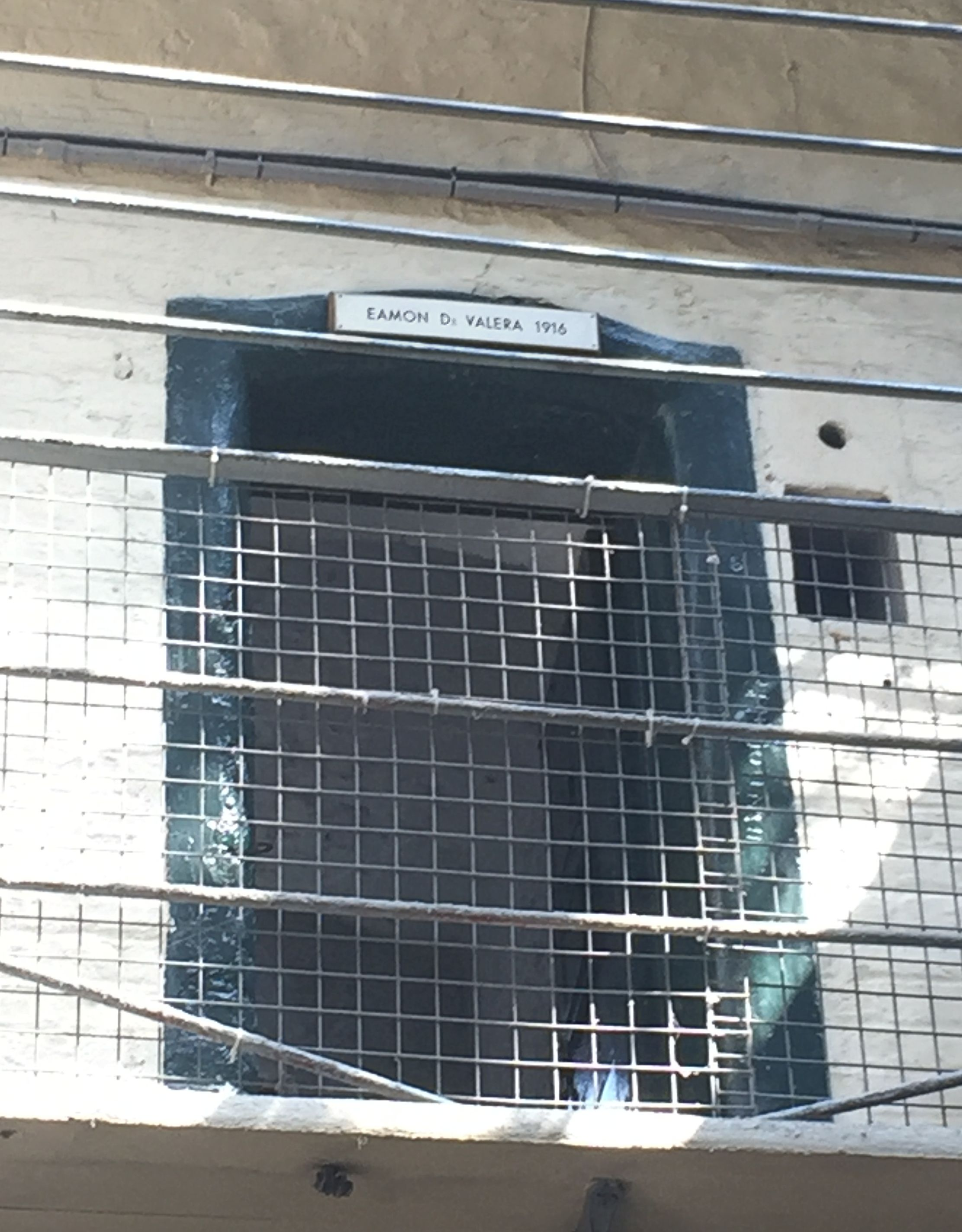
The Kilmainham Gaol cell of Éamon de Valera

De Valera's supporters and detractors argue about his bravery during the Easter Rising. His supporters claim he showed leadership skills and a capacity for meticulous planning. His detractors claim he suffered a nervous breakdown during the Rising. According to accounts from 1916, de Valera was seen running about, giving conflicting orders, refusing to sleep and on one occasion, having forgotten the password, almost getting himself shot in the dark by his own men. According to one account, de Valera, on being forced to sleep by one subordinate who promised to sit beside him and wake him if he was needed, suddenly woke up, his eyes "wild", screaming, "Set fire to the railway! Set fire to the railway!" Later in the Ballykinlar internment Camp, one de Valera loyalist approached another internee, a medical doctor, recounted the story, and asked for a medical opinion as to de Valera's condition. He also threatened to sue the doctor, future Fine Gael TD and Minister, Dr. Tom O'Higgins, if he ever repeated the story. The British reportedly, however, considered de Valera's forces the best-trained and best-led among the rebels. De Valera's latest biographer, Anthony J. Jordan, writes of this controversy, "Whatever happened in Boland's Mills, or any other garrison, does not negate or undermine in any way the extraordinary heroism of "Dev" and his comrades".

After imprisonment in Dartmoor, Maidstone and Lewes prisons, de Valera and his comrades were released under an amnesty in June 1917.

=== Election ===
On 10 July 1917, he was elected as the Member of Parliament (MP) for East Clare (the constituency which he represented until 1959) in a by-election caused by the death of the previous incumbent Willie Redmond, brother of the Irish Party leader John Redmond, who had died fighting in World War I. In the 1918 general election he was elected both for that seat and Mayo East. As an abstentionist de Valera would not have gone to Westminster, but was not able to do so regardless because in early 1918 he was again arrested.

Because most other Irish rebellion leaders were dead, in 1917 de Valera had been elected President of Sinn Féin, the party which had been blamed incorrectly for provoking the Easter Rising. This party became the political vehicle through which the survivors of the Easter Rising channelled their republican ethos and objectives. The previous President of Sinn Féin, Arthur Griffith, had championed an Anglo-Irish dual-monarchy based on the Austro-Hungarian model, with independent legislatures for both Ireland and Britain.

=== President of Dáil Éireann ===
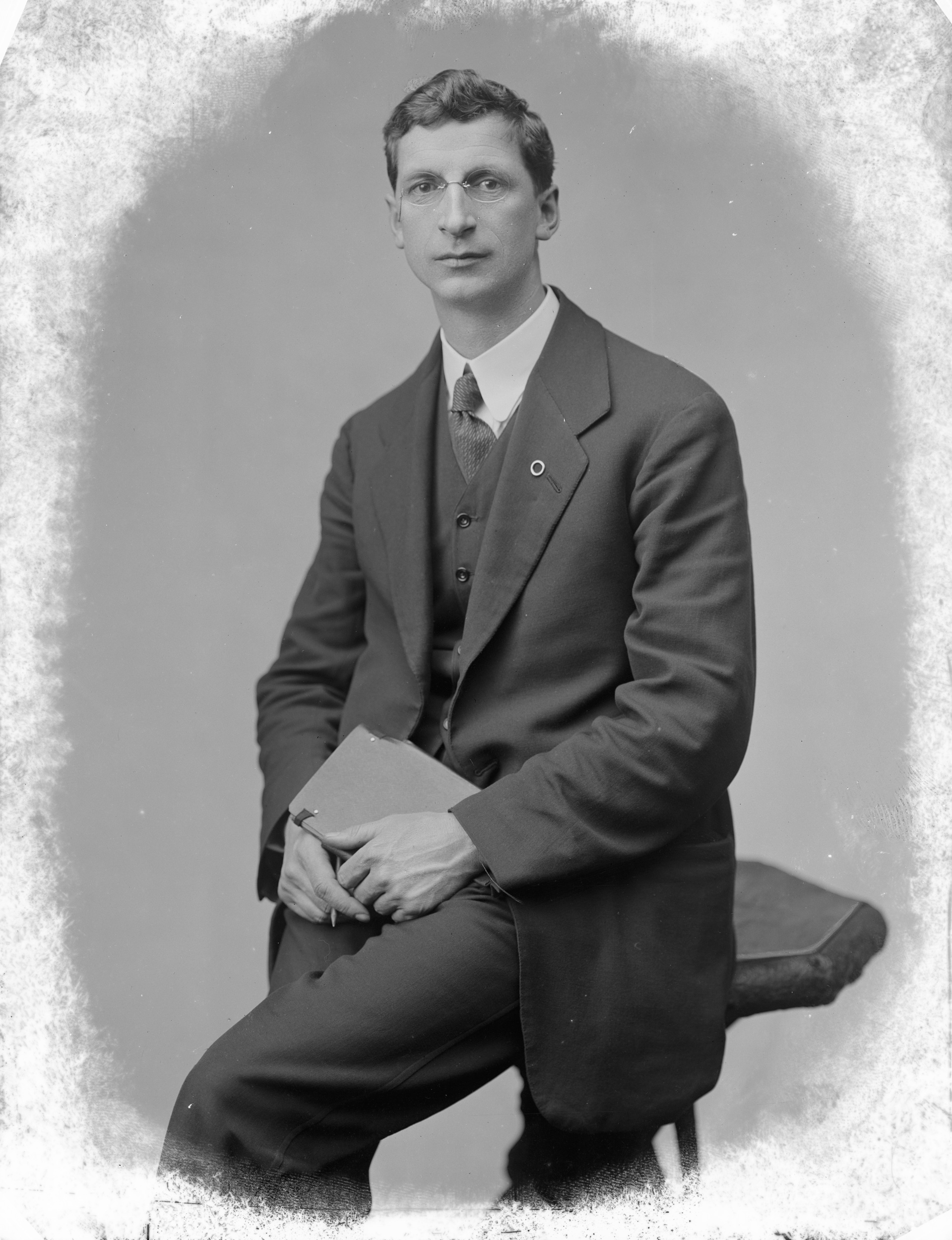
De Valera in March 1918

Sinn Féin won a huge majority in the 1918 general election, largely thanks to the British executions of the 1916 leaders, the threat of conscription with the Conscription Crisis of 1918 and the first-past-the-post ballot. They won 73 out of 105 Irish seats, with about 47% of votes cast. 25 seats were uncontested. On 21 January 1919, 27 Sinn Féin MPs (the rest were imprisoned or impaired), calling themselves Teachtaí Dála (TDs), assembled in the Mansion House in Dublin and formed an Irish parliament, known as Dáil Éireann (translatable into English as the Assembly of Ireland). The Ministry of Dáil Éireann was formed, under the leadership of the Príomh Aire (also called President of Dáil Éireann) Cathal Brugha. De Valera had been re-arrested in May 1918 and imprisoned and so could not attend the January session of the Dáil. He escaped from Lincoln Gaol, England in February 1919. As a result, he replaced Brugha as Príomh Aire in the April session of Dáil Éireann.

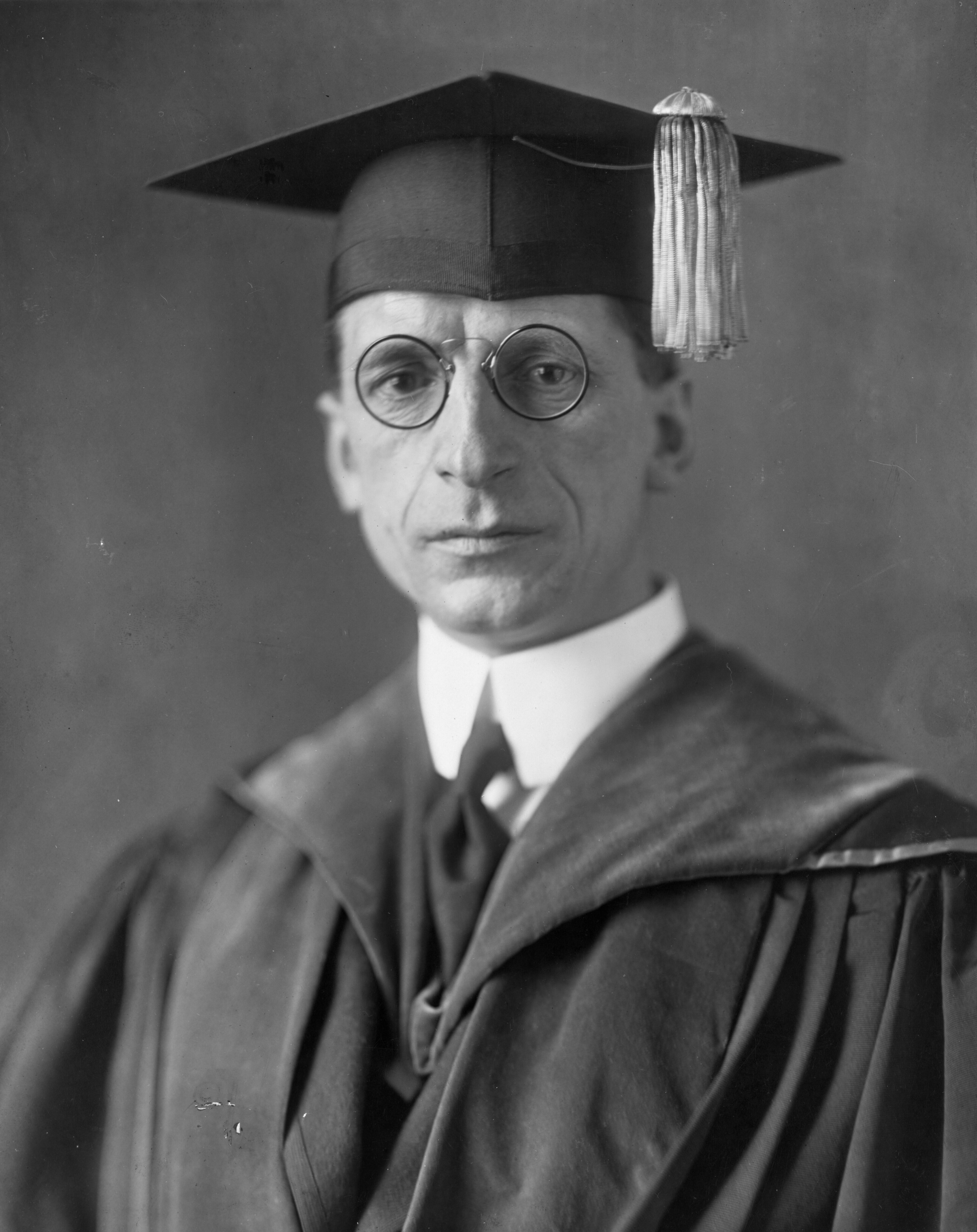
De Valera in academic dress to receive an honorary degree from the College of the Holy Cross in Massachusetts

In the hope of securing international recognition, Seán T. O'Kelly was sent as an envoy to Paris to present the Irish case to the Peace Conference convened by the great powers at the end of World War I. When it became clear by May 1919 that this mission could not succeed, de Valera decided to visit the United States. The mission had three objectives: to ask for official recognition of the Irish Republic, to float a loan to finance the work of the Government (and by extension, the Irish Republican Army), and to secure the support of the American people for the republic. His visit lasted from June 1919 to December 1920 and had mixed success, including a visit to Fenway Park in Boston in front of 50,000 supporters. One negative outcome was the splitting of the Irish-American organisations into pro- and anti-de Valera factions. He met the young Harvard-educated leader from Puerto Rico, Pedro Albizu Campos, and forged a lasting and useful alliance with him. It was during this American tour that he recruited his long-serving personal secretary, Kathleen O'Connell, an Irish emigrant who would return to Ireland with him. In October 1919, he visited the University of Notre Dame campus in Indiana, where he planted a tree and also laid a wreath by the statue of William Corby. He toured the university archives and spoke in Washington Hall about the cause of Ireland in front of twelve hundred students.

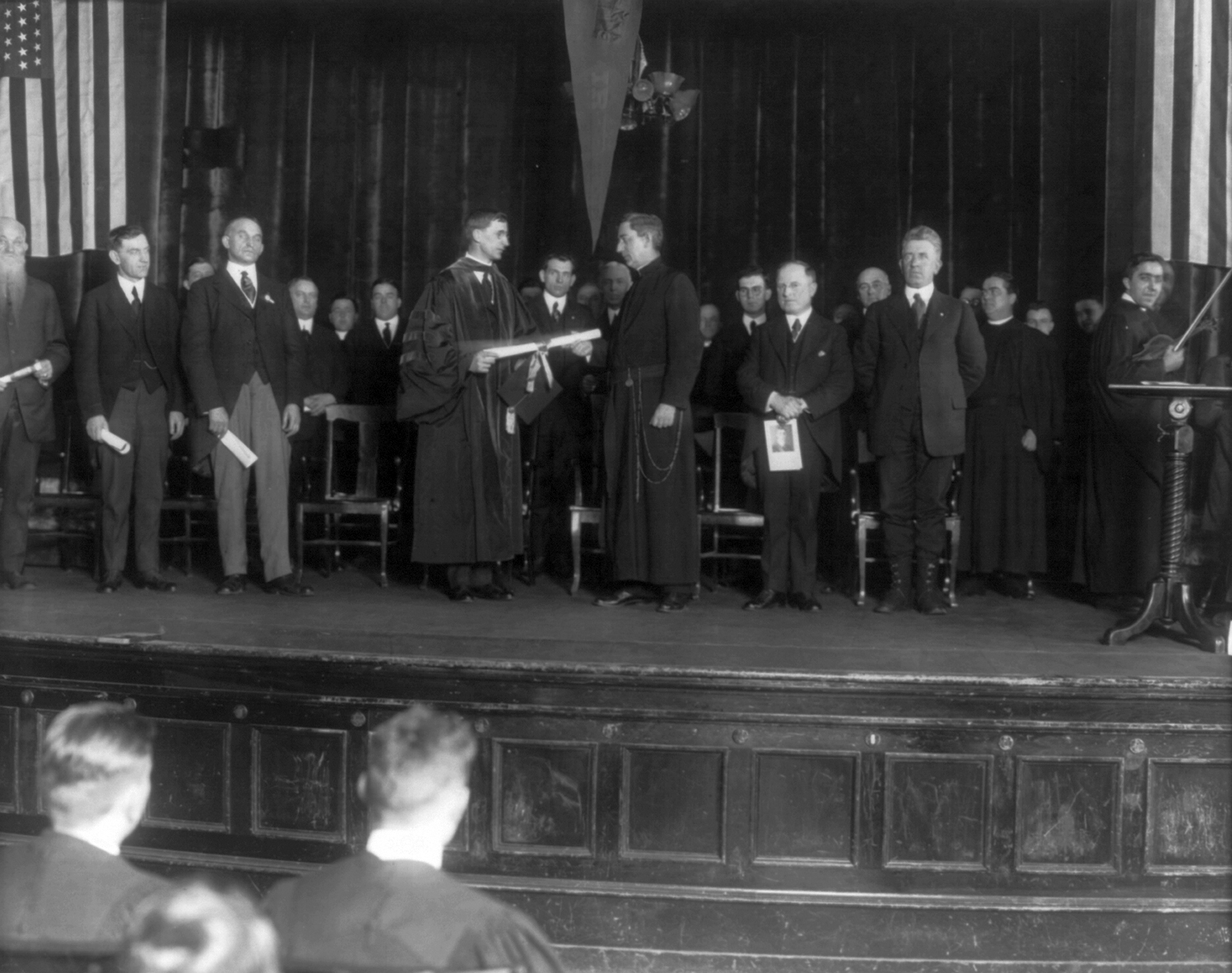
De Valera at the College of the Holy Cross in 1920

De Valera managed to raise $5,500,000 from American supporters, an amount that far exceeded the hopes of the Dáil. Of this, $500,000 was devoted to the American presidential campaign in 1920, helping him gain wider public support there. In 1921, it was said that $1,466,000 had already been spent, and it is unclear when the net balance arrived in Ireland. Recognition was not forthcoming in the international sphere. He also had difficulties with various Irish-American leaders, such as John Devoy and Judge Daniel F. Cohalan, who resented the dominant position he established, preferring to retain their control over Irish affairs in the United States. While American recognition for the Republic had been his priority, in February 1921, De Valera redirected Patrick McCartan from Washington to Moscow. McCartan was told by Maxim Litvinov, that the opportunity of recognition and assistance had passed. The Soviet priority was a trade agreement with Britain (signed in March). In June the British government (with a view to both domestic and American opinion) published the proposed treaty between the Dáil government and the Soviets, and related correspondence.

Meanwhile, in Ireland, the conflict between the British authorities and the Dáil (which the British declared illegal in September 1919), escalated into the Irish War of Independence. De Valera left day-to-day government, during his eighteen-month absence in the United States, to Michael Collins, his 29-year-old Minister for Finance. De Valera and Collins would later become opponents during the Irish Civil War.

=== President of the Republic ===
In January 1921, in his first appearance in the Dáil, after his return to a country gripped by the War of Independence, de Valera introduced a motion calling on the IRA to desist from ambushes and other tactics that were allowing the British to successfully portray it as a terrorist group, and to take on the British forces with conventional military methods. This they strongly opposed, and de Valera relented, issuing a statement expressing support for the IRA, and claiming it was fully under the control of the Dáil. He then, along with Cathal Brugha and Austin Stack, brought pressure to bear on Michael Collins to undertake a journey to the United States himself, on the pretext that only he could take up where de Valera had left off. Collins successfully resisted this move and stayed in Ireland. In the May 1921 elections, all candidates in Southern Ireland were returned unopposed, Nationalists and Sinn Féin secured 12 seats in Northern Ireland including leaders such as de Valera, Michael Collins, Eoin MacNeill and Arthur Griffith.

Following the Truce of July 1921 that ended the war, de Valera went to see Prime Minister David Lloyd George in London on 14 July. No agreement was reached, and by then the Parliament of Northern Ireland had already met. It became clear that neither a republic nor independence for all 32 counties, was going to be offered; Lloyd George told de Valera he could "put a soldier in Ireland for every man, woman and child in it" if the IRA did not immediately agree to stop fighting. In August 1921, de Valera secured Dáil Éireann's approval to change the 1919 Dáil Constitution to upgrade his office from prime minister or chairman of the cabinet to a full President of the Republic. On 10 August 1921 de Valera responded to the British offer of Dominion status within the British Empire (20 July 1921):

Ireland's right to choose for herself the path she shall take to realise her own destiny must be accepted as indefeasible. It is a right that has been maintained through centuries of oppression and at the cost of unparalleled sacrifice and untold suffering, and it will not be surrendered. We cannot propose to abrogate it, nor can Britain or any foreign state or group of states legitimately claim to interfere with its exercise in order to serve their own special interests.

Having been declared now as the Irish equivalent of King George V, he argued that as Irish head of state, in the absence of the British head of state from the negotiations, he too should not attend the peace conference called the Treaty Negotiations (October–December 1921) at which British and Irish government leaders agreed to the effective independence of twenty-six of Ireland's thirty-two counties as the Irish Free State, with Northern Ireland choosing to remain under British sovereignty. It is generally agreed by historians that whatever his motives, it was a mistake for de Valera not to have travelled to London.

Having effected these changes, the Irish Boundary Commission met in 1922-25 to redraw the Irish border. Nationalists expected its report to recommend that largely nationalist areas of Northern Ireland (South Armagh, South Down, Derry City and the Counties Tyrone and Fermanagh) become part of the Free State, and many hoped this would make Northern Ireland so small it would not be economically viable. A Council of Ireland was also provided in the Treaty as a model for an eventual all-Irish parliament. Hence neither the pro- nor anti-Treaty sides made many complaints about partition in the Treaty Debates.

=== Anglo-Irish Treaty ===
The Republic's delegates to the Treaty Negotiations were accredited by de Valera and his cabinet as plenipotentiaries (that is, negotiators with the legal authority to sign a treaty without reference back to the cabinet), but were given secret cabinet instructions by de Valera that required them to return to Dublin before signing the Treaty. The Treaty proved controversial in Ireland insofar as it replaced the Republic by a dominion of the British Commonwealth with the King represented by a Governor-General of the Irish Free State. The Irish delegates Arthur Griffith, Robert Barton and Michael Collins supported by Erskine Childers as Secretary-General set up their delegation headquarters at 22 Hans Place in Knightsbridge. It was there, at 11.15 am on 5 December 1921, that the decision was made to recommend the Treaty to Dáil Éireann. The Treaty was finally signed by the delegates after further negotiations which closed at 02:15 on 6 December 1921.

De Valera baulked at the agreement. His opponents claimed that he had refused to join the negotiations because he knew what the outcome would be and did not wish to receive the blame. De Valera claimed that he had not gone to the treaty negotiations because he would be better able to control the extremists at home, and that his absence would allow leverage for the plenipotentiaries to refer back to him and not be pressured into any agreements. Because of the secret instructions given to the plenipotentiaries, he reacted to news of the signing of the Treaty not with anger at its contents (which he refused even to read when offered a newspaper report of its contents), but with anger over the fact that they had not consulted him, their president, before signing. His ideal drafts, presented to a secret session of the Dáil during the Treaty Debates and publicised in January 1922, were ingenious compromises but they included dominion status, the Treaty Ports, the fact of partition subject to veto by the parliament in Belfast, and some continuing status for the King as head of the Commonwealth. Ireland's share of the imperial debt and the payment of war pensions was to be paid.

After the Treaty was narrowly ratified by 64 to 57, de Valera and a large minority of Sinn Féin TDs left Dáil Éireann. He then resigned and Arthur Griffith was elected President of Dáil Éireann in his place, though respectfully still calling him 'The President'. On a speaking tour of the more republican province of Munster, starting on 17 March 1922, de Valera made controversial speeches at Carrick on Suir, Lismore, Dungarvan and Waterford, saying that: "If the Treaty were accepted, [by the electorate] the fight for freedom would still go on, and the Irish people, instead of fighting foreign soldiers, will have to fight the Irish soldiers of an Irish government set up by Irishmen." At Thurles, several days later, he repeated this imagery and added that the IRA: "...would have to wade through the blood of the soldiers of the Irish Government, and perhaps through that of some members of the Irish Government to get their freedom." In a letter to the Irish Independent on 23 March de Valera accepted the accuracy of their report of his comment about "wading" through blood, but deplored that the newspaper had published it.

De Valera objected to the oath of allegiance to the King that the treaty required Irish parliamentarians to take. He also was concerned that Ireland could not have an independent foreign policy as part of the British Commonwealth when the British retained several naval ports (see Treaty Ports) around Ireland's coast. As a compromise, de Valera proposed "external association" with the British Empire, which would leave Ireland's foreign policy in her own hands and a republican constitution with no mention of the British monarch (he proposed this as early as April, well before the negotiations began, under the title "Document No. 2"). Michael Collins was prepared to accept this formula and the two wings (pro- and anti-Treaty) of Sinn Féin formed a pact to fight the 1922 Irish general election together and form a coalition government afterwards. Collins later called off the pact on the eve of the election. De Valera's opponents won the election and civil war broke out shortly afterwards in late June 1922.

=== Civil War ===
Relations between the new Irish government, which was backed by most of the Dáil and the electorate, and the anti-treatyites, under the nominal leadership of de Valera, now descended into the Irish Civil War (June 1922 to May 1923), in which the pro-treaty Free State forces defeated the anti-treaty IRA. Both sides had wanted to avoid civil war, but fighting broke out over the takeover of the Four Courts in Dublin by anti-treaty members of the IRA. These men were not loyal to de Valera and initially were not even supported by the executive of the anti-treaty IRA. However, Michael Collins was forced to act against them when Winston Churchill threatened to re-occupy the country with British troops unless action was taken. When fighting broke out in Dublin between the Four Courts garrison and the new Free State Army, republicans backed the IRA men in the Four Courts, and civil war broke out. De Valera, though he held no military position, backed the anti-treaty IRA, or irregulars, and said that he was re-enlisting in the IRA as an ordinary volunteer. On 8 September 1922, he met in secret with Richard Mulcahy in Dublin to try to halt the fighting. However, according to de Valera, they "could not find a basis" for agreement.

Though nominally head of the anti-treatyites, de Valera had little influence. He does not seem to have been involved in any fighting and had little or no influence with the revolutionary military leadership, headed by IRA Chief of Staff Liam Lynch. De Valera and the anti-treaty TDs formed a "republican government" on 25 October 1922 from anti-treaty TDs to "be temporarily the Supreme Executive of the Republic and the State, until such time as the elected Parliament of the Republic can freely assemble, or the people being rid of external aggression are at liberty to decide freely how they are to be governed and what shall be their political relations with other countries" . However, it had no real authority and was a pale shadow of the Dáil government of 1919–21.

In March 1923, de Valera attended the meeting of the IRA Army Executive to decide on the future of the war. He was known to be in favour of a truce but he had no voting rights and it was narrowly decided to continue hostilities. The leader of the Free State, W. T. Cosgrave, insisted that there could be no acceptance of a surrender without disarming.

On 30 April 1923, the IRA's new chief of staff, Frank Aiken (Lynch had been killed), called a ceasefire. This was followed on 24 May by an order for volunteers to "dump arms". De Valera, who had wanted an end to the internecine fighting for some time, backed the ceasefire order with a message in which he called the anti-treaty fighters "the Legion of the Rearguard", saying that "The Republic can no longer be successfully defended by your arms. Further sacrifice on your part would now be in vain and the continuance of the struggle in arms unwise in the national interest and prejudicial to the future of our cause. Military victory must be allowed to rest for the moment with those who have destroyed the republic. Other means must be sought to safeguard the nation's right."

After this point, many of the republicans were arrested in Free State round-ups when they had come out of hiding and returned home. De Valera remained in hiding for several months after the ceasefire was declared; however, he emerged in August to stand for election in County Clare. Referring to the Clare electorate he said: "If the people of Clare elect me as their candidate again, I will be with them and nothing but a bullet will stop me". Making a campaign appearance in Ennis on 15 August, de Valera was arrested on the platform and interned at Kilmainham jail. He was moved to Arbour Hill barracks briefly prior to his release on 16 July 1924.

== Founding of Fianna Fáil ==
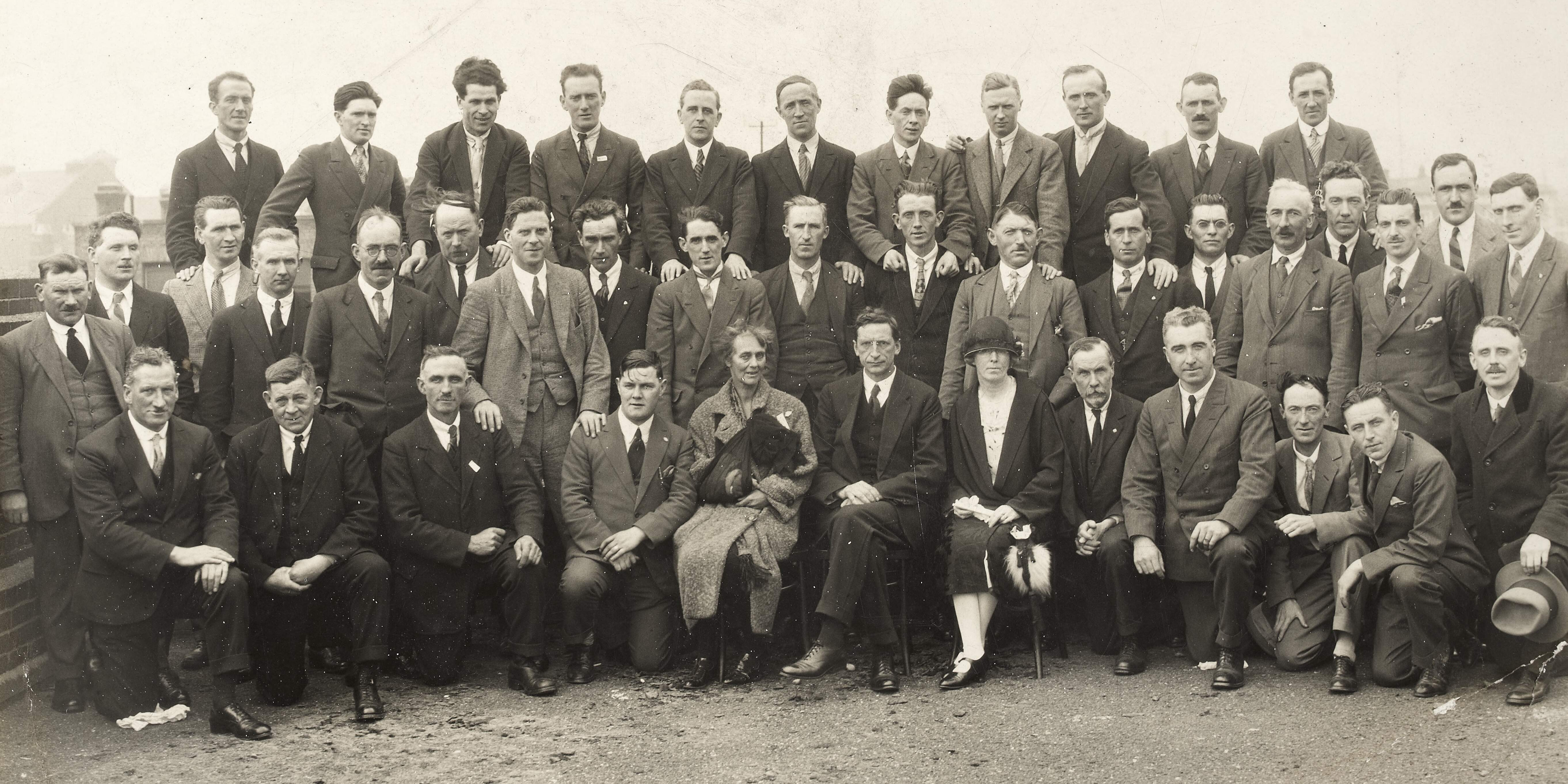
De Valera surrounded by founding members of Fianna Fáil in 1927, including Constance Markiewicz, P. J. Ruttledge, Frank Aiken, Seán Lemass and many others.

After the IRA dumped their arms rather than surrender them or continue a now fruitless war, de Valera returned to political methods. In 1924, he was arrested in Newry for "illegally entering Northern Ireland" and later arrested in Derry. When at trial in Belfast on 1 November 1924 he refused to recognize the court saying that it was: "a creature of a foreign power and therefore had not the sanction of the Irish people". He was held in solitary confinement for a month in Crumlin Road Gaol, Belfast.

During this time, de Valera came to believe that abstentionism was not a workable tactic in the long term. He now believed that a better course would be to try to gain power and turn the Free State from a constitutional monarchy into a republic. He tried to convince Sinn Féin to accept this new line. However, a vote to accept the Free State Constitution (contingent on the abolition of the Oath of Allegiance) narrowly failed. Soon afterwards, de Valera resigned from Sinn Féin and seriously considered leaving politics.

However, one of his colleagues, Seán Lemass, convinced de Valera to found a new republican party. In March 1926, with Lemass, Constance Markievicz and others, de Valera formed a new party, Fianna Fáil (The Warriors of Destiny), a party that was to dominate 20th-century Irish politics. While Sinn Féin still held to an abstentionist line, Fianna Fáil was dedicated to republicanising the Free State from within if it gained power.

Having attracted most of Sinn Féin's branches due to Lemass' organisational skill, the new party made swift electoral gains in the general election on 9 June 1927. In the process, it took much of Sinn Féin's previous support, winning 44 seats to Sinn Féin's five. It refused to take the Oath of Allegiance (portrayed by opponents as an 'Oath of Allegiance to the Crown' but actually an Oath of Allegiance to the Irish Free State with a secondary promise of fidelity to the King in his role in the Treaty settlement).

The oath was largely the work of Collins and based on three sources: British oaths in the dominions, the oath of the Irish Republican Brotherhood and a draft oath prepared by de Valera in his proposed treaty alternative, "Document No. 2". De Valera began a legal case to challenge the requirement that members of his party take the Oath, but the assassination of the Vice-President of the Executive Council (deputy prime minister) Kevin O'Higgins on 10 July 1927 led the Executive Council under W. T. Cosgrave to introduce a Bill on 20 July requiring all Dáil candidates to promise on oath that if they were elected they would take the Oath of Allegiance. Forced into a corner, and faced with the option of staying outside politics forever or taking the oath and entering, de Valera and his TDs took the Oath of Allegiance on 12 August 1927, though de Valera himself described the Oath as "an empty political formula".

De Valera never organised Fianna Fáil in Northern Ireland and it was not until 7 December 2007 that Fianna Fáil was registered there by the UK Electoral Commission.

== President of the Executive Council ==
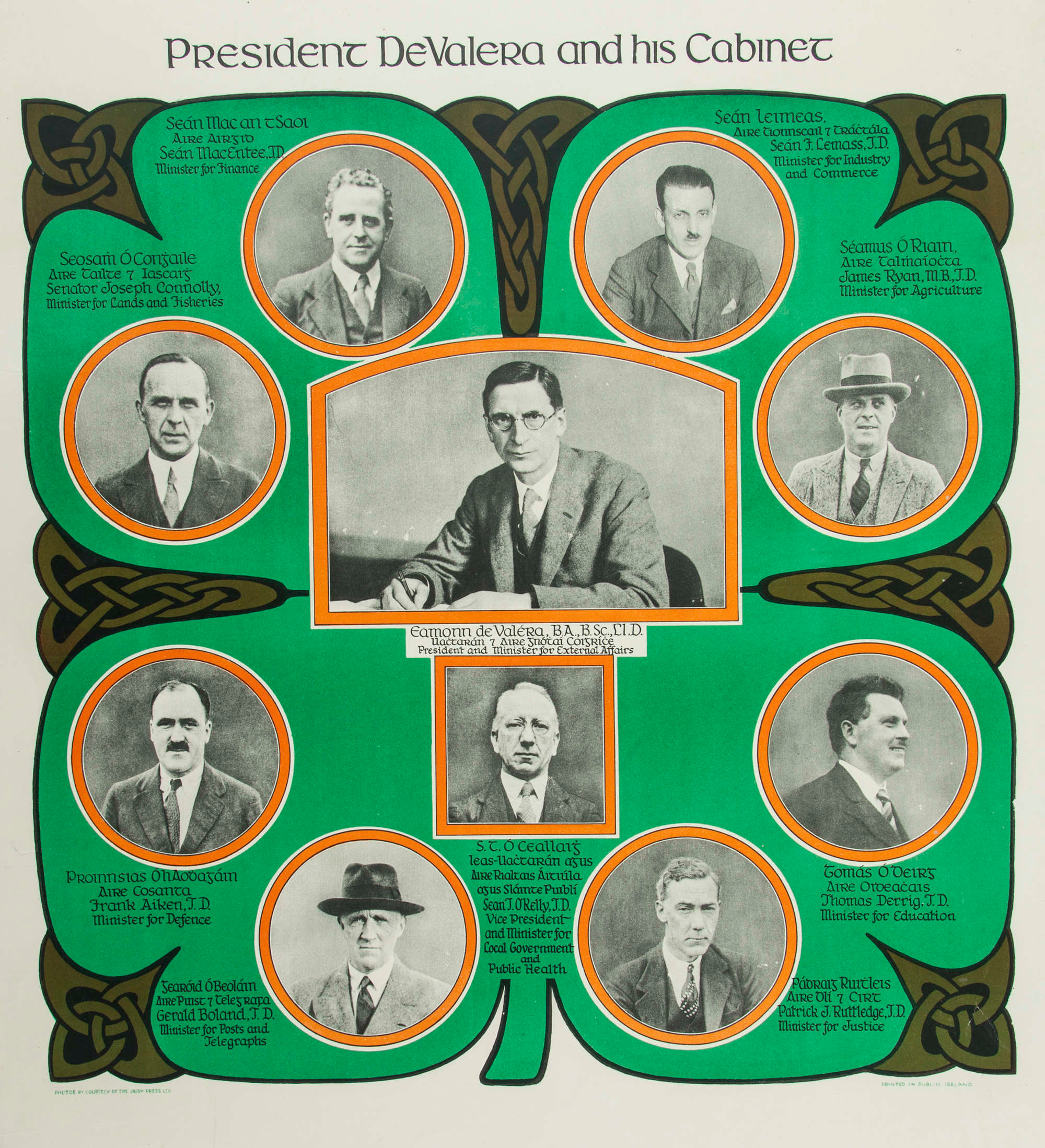
1932 Fianna Fáil poster displaying De Valera's new cabinet, featuring prominent figures such as Lemass, Aiken and Boland

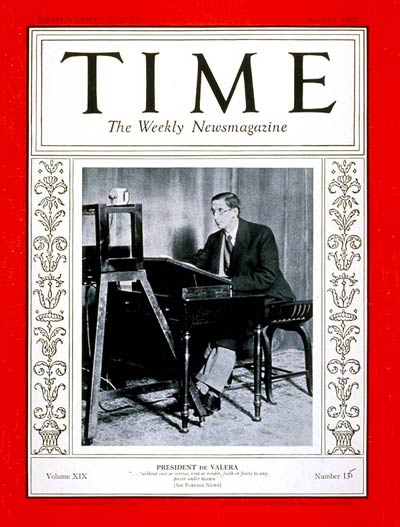
De Valera on the cover of Time magazine in 1932

In the 1932 general election Fianna Fáil secured 72 seats and became the largest party in the Dáil, although without a majority. Some Fianna Fáil members arrived at the first sitting of the new Dáil carrying arms, amid fears that Cumann na nGaedheal would not voluntarily surrender power. However, the transition was peaceful. De Valera was elected President of the Executive Council (Prime Minister) by the Dáil by a vote of 81–68, with the support of the Labour Party and Independent politicians, and took office on 9 March.

He at once initiated steps to fulfil his election promises to abolish the oath and withhold land annuities owed to the UK for loans provided under the Irish Land Acts and agreed as part of the 1921 Treaty. This launched the Anglo-Irish Trade War when the UK in retaliation imposed economic sanctions against Irish exports. De Valera responded in kind with levies on British imports. The ensuing "Economic War" lasted until 1938.

After De Valera had urged King George V to dismiss McNeill as governor-general, the King suggested an alternative course of action: that McNeill, instead, carry on a while longer as viceroy and only then resign, which he did on 1 November 1932. Subsequently, a 1916 veteran, Domhnall Ua Buachalla, was appointed governor-general. To strengthen his position against the opposition in the Dáil and Seanad, de Valera directed the Governor-General to call a snap election in January 1933 and de Valera's party won 77 seats, giving Fianna Fáil an overall majority. Under de Valera's leadership, Fianna Fáil won further general elections in 1937, 1938, 1943, and 1944.

De Valera took charge of Ireland's foreign policy as well by also acting as Minister for External Affairs. In that capacity, he attended meetings of the League of Nations. He was president of the Council of the League on his first appearance at the league in Geneva, Switzerland, in 1932 and, in a speech that made a worldwide impression, appealed for genuine adherence by its members to the principles of the covenant of the league. In 1934, he supported the admission of the Soviet Union into the league. In September 1938, he was elected the nineteenth president of the Assembly of the League, a tribute to the international recognition he had won by his independent stance on world questions.

De Valera's government followed the policy of unilaterally dismantling the treaty of 1921. In this way, he would be pursuing republican policies and lessening the popularity of republican violence and the IRA. De Valera encouraged IRA members to join the Irish Defence Forces and the Gardaí. He also refused to dismiss from office those Cumann na nGaedheal, Cosgrave supporters, who had previously opposed him during the Civil War. He did, however, dismiss Eoin O'Duffy from his position as Garda Commissioner after a year. Eoin O'Duffy was then invited to be head of the Army Comrades Association (ACA) formed to protect and promote the welfare of its members, previously led by J.F. O'Higgins, Kevin O'Higgins's brother. This organisation was an obstacle to de Valera's power as it supported Cumann na nGaedheal and provided stewards for their meetings. Cumann na nGaedheal meetings were frequently disrupted by Fianna Fáil supporters following the publication of the article: No Free Speech for Traitors by Peadar O'Donnell, an IRA member.

The ACA changed its name to the National Guard under O'Duffy and adopted the uniform of black berets and blue shirts, using the straight-armed salute, and were nicknamed the Blueshirts. They were outwardly fascist and planned a march in August 1933 through Dublin to commemorate Michael Collins, Kevin O'Higgins, and Arthur Griffith. This march struck parallels with Mussolini's march on Rome (1922), in which he had created the image of having toppled the democratic government in Rome. De Valera revived a military tribunal, which had been set up by the previous administration, to deal with the matter. O'Duffy backed down when the National Guard was declared an illegal organisation and the march was banned. Within a few weeks, O'Duffy's followers merged with Cumann na nGaedhael and the Centre Party to form United Ireland, or Fine Gael, and O'Duffy became its leader. Smaller local marches were scheduled for the following weeks, under different names. Internal dissension set in when the party's TDs distanced themselves from O'Duffy's extreme views, and his movement fell asunder.

== Taoiseach (1937–1948) ==
=== Constitution of Ireland ===
During the 1930s, de Valera systematically stripped the Irish Free State constitution – a constitution originally drafted by a committee under the nominal chairmanship of his rival, Collins – of features tying Ireland to the United Kingdom, limiting its independence and the republican character of its state. De Valera was able to carry out this program of constitutional change by taking advantage of three earlier modifications of constitutional arrangements. First, though the 1922 constitution originally required a public plebiscite for any amendment enacted more than eight years after its passage, the Free State government under W. T. Cosgrave had amended that period to sixteen years. This meant that, until 1938, the Free State constitution could be amended by the simple passage of a Constitutional Amendment Act through the Oireachtas. Secondly, while the Governor-General of the Irish Free State could reserve or deny Royal Assent to any legislation, from 1927, the power to advise the Governor-General to do so no longer rested with the British government in London but with His Majesty's Government in the Irish Free State, which meant that, in practice, the Royal Assent was automatically granted to legislation; the government was hardly likely to advise the governor-general to block the enactment of one of its own bills. Thirdly, though in its original theory, the constitution had to be in keeping with the provisions of the Anglo-Irish Treaty as the fundamental law of the state, that requirement had been abrogated a short time before de Valera gained power.

The Oath of Allegiance was abolished, as were appeals to the Judicial Committee of the Privy Council. The opposition-controlled Senate, when it protested and slowed down these measures, was also abolished. In 1931, the British Parliament passed the Statute of Westminster, which all but eliminated the UK Parliament's authority to legislate for the self-governing Dominions of the then British Commonwealth, including the Irish Free State, and gave them legislative equality with the United Kingdom. Though a few constitutional links between the Dominions and the United Kingdom remained, this is often seen as the moment at which the Dominions became fully sovereign states.

Shortly after the Statute passed, Cosgrave sought and received the right to have an Irish minister advise the king on matters related to the Free State to the exclusion of British ministers. This allowed the President of the Executive Council to directly advise the King in his capacity as His Majesty's Irish Prime Minister. in this capacity, De Valera wrote in July 1936 to King Edward VIII in London indicating that he planned to introduce a new constitution, the central part of which was to be the creation of an office de Valera provisionally intended to call President of Saorstát Éireann (Irish: Uachtarán Shaorstát Éireann), which would replace the governor-general. De Valera used the sudden abdication of Edward VIII as King to pass two bills: one amended the constitution to remove all mention of the monarch and governor-general, while the second brought the monarch back, this time through statute law, for use in representing the Irish Free State at a diplomatic level. With the implementation of the Constitution of Ireland (Irish: Bunreacht na hÉireann), the title ultimately given to the president was President of Ireland (Irish: Uachtarán na hÉireann).

The constitution contained reforms and symbols intended to assert Irish sovereignty. These included:

- a new name for the state, "Éire" (in Irish) and "Ireland" (in English);
- a claim that the national territory was the entire island of Ireland, thereby challenging Britain's partition settlement of 1921;
- the removal of references to the King of Ireland and the replacement of the monarch's representative, the governor-general, with a popularly elected President of Ireland, who takes "precedence over all other persons in the State and who shall exercise and perform the powers and functions conferred on the President by this Constitution and by law";
- recognition of the "special position" of the Catholic Church;
- a recognition of the Catholic concept of marriage which excluded civil divorce, even though civil marriage was retained;
- the declaration that the Irish language was the "national language" and the first official language of the nation although English was also included as "a" second official language;
- the use of Irish language terms to stress Irish cultural and historical identity (e.g., Uachtarán, Taoiseach, Tánaiste, etc.)

Criticisms of some of the above constitutional reforms include that:

- the anti-partition articles needlessly antagonised Unionists in Northern Ireland, while simultaneously attracting criticism from hardline republicans by recognising the de facto situation.
- similarly, the recognition of the "special position" of the Catholic Church was inconsistent with the identity and aspirations of northern Protestants (leading to its repeal in the 1970s), while simultaneously falling short of the demands of hardline Catholics for Catholicism to be explicitly made the state religion.
- the affirmation of Irish as the national and primary official language neither reflected contemporary realities nor led to the language's revival
- though the King was removed from the text of the constitution, he retained a leading role in the state's foreign affairs, and the legal position of the President of Ireland was accordingly uncertain; there was also concern that the presidency would evolve into a dictatorial position
- elements of Catholic social teaching incorporated into the text, such as the articles on the role of women, the family and divorce, were inconsistent both with the practice of the Protestant minority and with contemporary liberal opinion

As Paul Bew concludes, in the constitution of 1937 de Valera was "trying to placate left-wing Republicans with national phrases and pious people with expressly Catholic bits [and] patriarchal Catholicism".

The Constitution was approved in a plebiscite on 1 July 1937 and came into force on 29 December 1937. With Fianna Fáil having won the election held the same day as the plebiscite that ratified the constitution, de Valera continued as President of the Executive Council until 29 December 1937, when the new constitution was enacted. On that date, de Valera's post automatically became that of Taoiseach, which was a considerably more powerful office. Notably, he could advise the president to dismiss ministers individually – advice that the president was bound to follow by convention. The old executive council had to be dissolved and reformed en bloc if its president wanted to remove a minister. Additionally, he could request a parliamentary dissolution on his own authority. Previously, the right to seek a dissolution was vested with the council as a whole.

In social policy, de Valera's first period as taoiseach saw the introduction (in 1947) of means-tested allowances for people suffering from infectious diseases.

=== Anglo-Irish Trade Agreement ===
With the new constitution in place, de Valera determined that the changed circumstances made swift resolution to Ireland's ongoing trade war with the UK more desirable for both sides—as did the growing probability of the outbreak of war across Europe. In April 1938, de Valera and British Prime Minister Neville Chamberlain signed the Anglo-Irish Trade Agreement, lifting all duties imposed during the previous five years and ending British use of the Treaty Ports it had retained in accordance with the Anglo-Irish Treaty. The return of the ports was of particular significance since it ensured Irish neutrality during the coming Second World War.

=== The Emergency (World War II) ===
By September 1939, a general European war was imminent. On 2 September, de Valera advised Dáil Éireann that neutrality was the best policy for the country. This policy had overwhelming political and popular support, though some advocated Irish participation in the war on the Allied side, while others, believing that "England's difficulty is Ireland's opportunity", were pro-German. Strong objections to conscription in the North were voiced by de Valera. In June 1940, to encourage the neutral Irish state to join with the Allies, Winston Churchill indicated to de Valera that the United Kingdom would push for Irish unity, but believing that Churchill could not deliver, de Valera declined the offer. The day after the attacks on Pearl Harbor Churchill wired de Valera: "Now is your chance. Now or never! A nation once again. I will meet you wherever you wish." The British did not inform the Government of Northern Ireland that they had made the offer to the Irish government, and De Valera's rejection was not publicised until 1970.

The government secured wide powers for the duration of the Emergency, such as internment, censorship of the press and correspondence, and government control of the economy. The Emergency Powers Act lapsed on 2 September 1946, though the State of Emergency declared under the constitution was not lifted until the 1970s. This status remained throughout the war, despite pressure from Chamberlain and Churchill. However, de Valera did respond to a request from Northern Ireland for fire tenders to assist in fighting fires following the 1941 Belfast Blitz. His 1943 St Patrick's Day radio address, now widely derided, showcased his traditionalist views, extolling an Ireland "satisfied with frugal comfort", populated by "sturdy children" and "happy maidens".

Controversially, de Valera visited and offered condolences to the German ambassador in Dublin on the death of Adolf Hitler in 1945, in accordance with diplomatic protocol of neutral nations. This did some damage to Ireland's international reputation, particularly in the United States – and soon afterwards de Valera had a bitter exchange of words with Churchill in two famous radio addresses after the end of the war in Europe. De Valera denounced reports of Bergen-Belsen concentration camp as "anti-national propaganda"; according to Bew, this was not out of disbelief but rather because the Holocaust undermined the main assumption underlying Irish neutrality: moral equivalence between the Allies and the Axis.

The de Valera government was reputedly harsh with Irish Army deserters who had enlisted to fight with the Allied armies against the Axis. The legislation in question was the Emergency Powers (No. 362) order which was passed in August 1945. On 18 October 1945, Thomas F. O'Higgins moved to annul the order. He did not condone desertion, but felt that the order was specifically harsh on those deserters who had served in the Allied forces. General Richard Mulcahy also spoke against the Order, disagreeing with the way in which it applied to enlisted men and not to officers. It was revoked with effect from 1 August 1946, but was in effect continued by section 13 of the Defence Forces (Temporary Provisions) Act, 1946.

== Post-war period: Taoiseach/Opposition leader ==
=== Opposition leader (1948–1951) ===
After de Valera had spent sixteen years in power without answering the crucial questions of partition and republican status the public demanded a change from the Fianna Fáil government. In the 1948 election, de Valera lost the outright majority he had enjoyed since 1933. It initially looked as if the National Labour Party would give Fianna Fáil enough support to stay in office as a minority government, but National Labour insisted on a formal coalition agreement, something de Valera was unwilling to concede. However, while Fianna Fáil was six seats short of a majority, it was still by far the largest party in the Dáil, with 37 more TDs than the next largest party and rival, Fine Gael (the successor to Cumann na nGaedheal). Conventional wisdom held that de Valera would remain Taoiseach with the support of independent deputies.

This belief came to nought when (after the final votes were counted) the other parties realised that if they banded together, they would have only one seat fewer than Fianna Fáil, and would be able to form a government with the support of at least seven independents. The result was the First Inter-Party Government, with John A. Costello of Fine Gael as its compromise candidate for Taoiseach. Costello was duly nominated, consigning de Valera to opposition for the first time in 16 years. The following year, Costello declared Ireland as a republic, leaving partition as the most pressing political issue of the day.

De Valera, now Leader of the Opposition, left the actual parliamentary practice of opposing the government to his deputy, Seán Lemass, and himself embarked on a world campaign to address the issue of partition. He visited the United States, Australia, New Zealand and India, and in the latter country, was the last guest of the governor-general, Lord Mountbatten of Burma, before he was succeeded by the first Indian-born Governor-General. In Melbourne, Australia, de Valera was feted by the powerful Catholic Archbishop Daniel Mannix, at the centenary celebrations of the diocese of Melbourne. He attended mass meetings at Xavier College, and addressed the assembled Melbourne Celtic Club. In Brisbane, Australia, at the request of the influential and long-serving Archbishop Duhig, de Valera laid the foundation stone for the new High School building at Marist Brothers College Rosalie. In October 1950, just thirty years after his dramatic escape from Lincoln Gaol, he returned to Lincoln and received the freedom of the gaol. A key message in de Valera's campaign was that Ireland could not join the recently established North Atlantic Treaty Organization as long as Northern Ireland was in British hands; although Costello's government favoured alliance with NATO, de Valera's approach won more widespread support and prevented the state from signing the treaty.

=== Final years as taoiseach ===
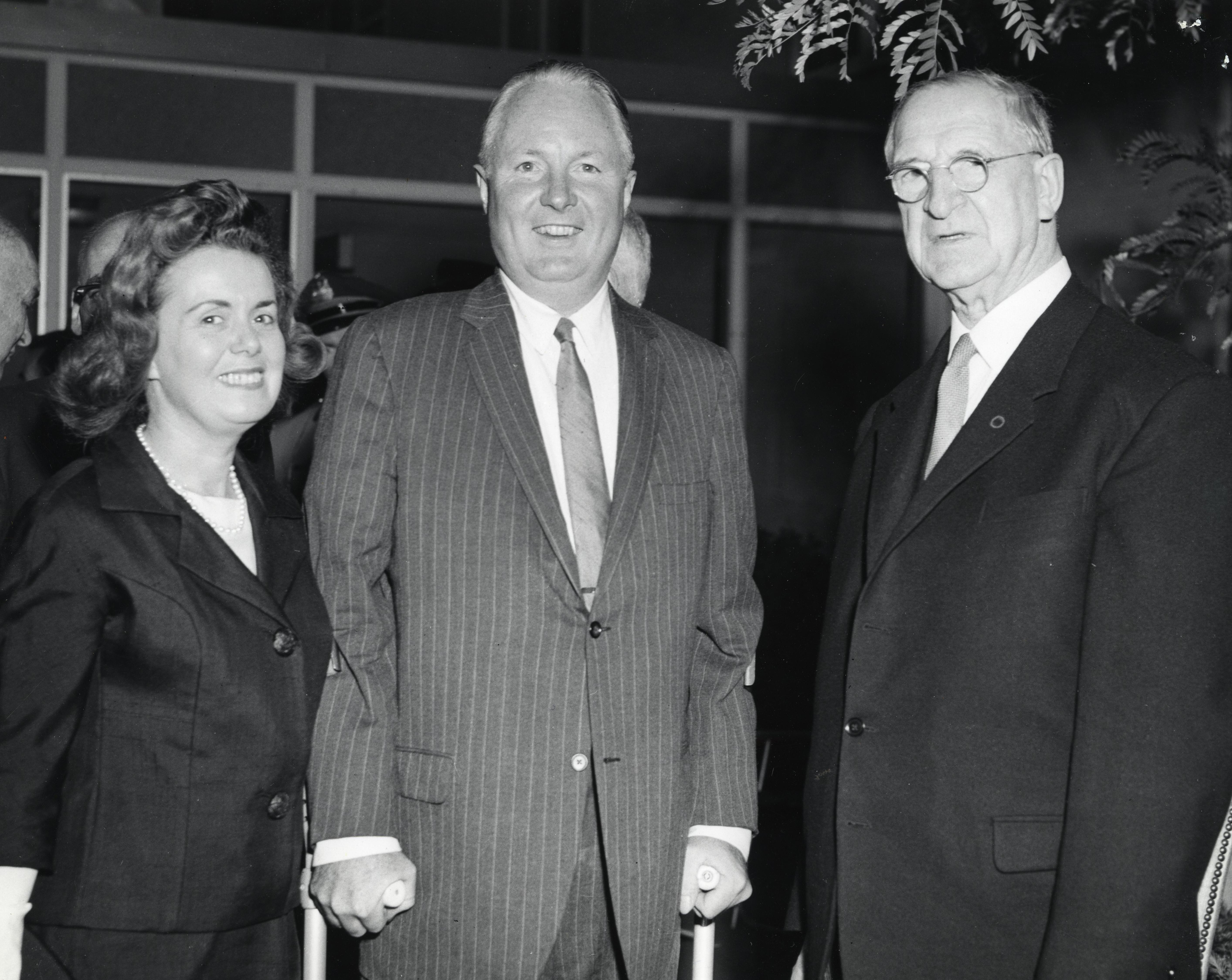
De Valera (right) with Mayor of Boston John F. Collins and his wife Mary

Returning to Ireland during the Mother and Child Scheme crisis that racked the First Inter-Party Government, de Valera kept silent as Leader of the Opposition, preferring to stay aloof from the controversy. That stance helped return de Valera to power in the 1951 general election, but without an overall majority. His and Fianna Fáil's popularity was short-lived, however; his government introduced severe, deflationary budgetary and economic policies in 1952, causing a political backlash that cost Fianna Fáil several seats in the Dáil in by-elections of 1953 and early 1954. Faced with a likely loss of confidence in the Dáil, de Valera instead called an election in May 1954, in which Fianna Fáil was defeated and a Second Inter-Party Government was formed with John A. Costello again as Taoiseach.

On 16 September 1953, de Valera met British Prime Minister Winston Churchill for the first and only time, at 10 Downing Street. (The two men had seen each other at a party in 1949, but without speaking). He surprised the UK Prime Minister by claiming that if he had been in office in 1948 Ireland would not have left the Commonwealth.

It was during this period that de Valera's eyesight began to deteriorate and he was forced to spend several months in the Netherlands, where he had six operations. In 1955, while in opposition, de Valera spoke against the formation of a European Parliament and European federalism, noting that Ireland "did not strive to get out of that British domination [...] to get into a worse [position]".

Like the first coalition government, the second lasted only three years. At the general election of 1957, de Valera, then in his seventy-fifth year, won an absolute majority of nine seats, the greatest number he had ever secured. This was the beginning of another sixteen-year period in office for Fianna Fáil. A new economic policy emerged with the First Programme for Economic Expansion. In July 1957, in response to the Border Campaign (IRA), Part II of the Offences Against the State Act was re-activated and he ordered the internment without trial of Republican suspects, an action which did much to end the IRA's campaign.

De Valera's final term as Taoiseach also saw the passage of numerous reforms in health and welfare. In 1952, unemployment insurance was extended to male agricultural employees, child allowances were extended to the second child, and a maternity allowance for insured women was introduced. A year later, eligibility for maternity and child services and public hospital services was extended to approximately 85% of the population.

== President of Ireland ==
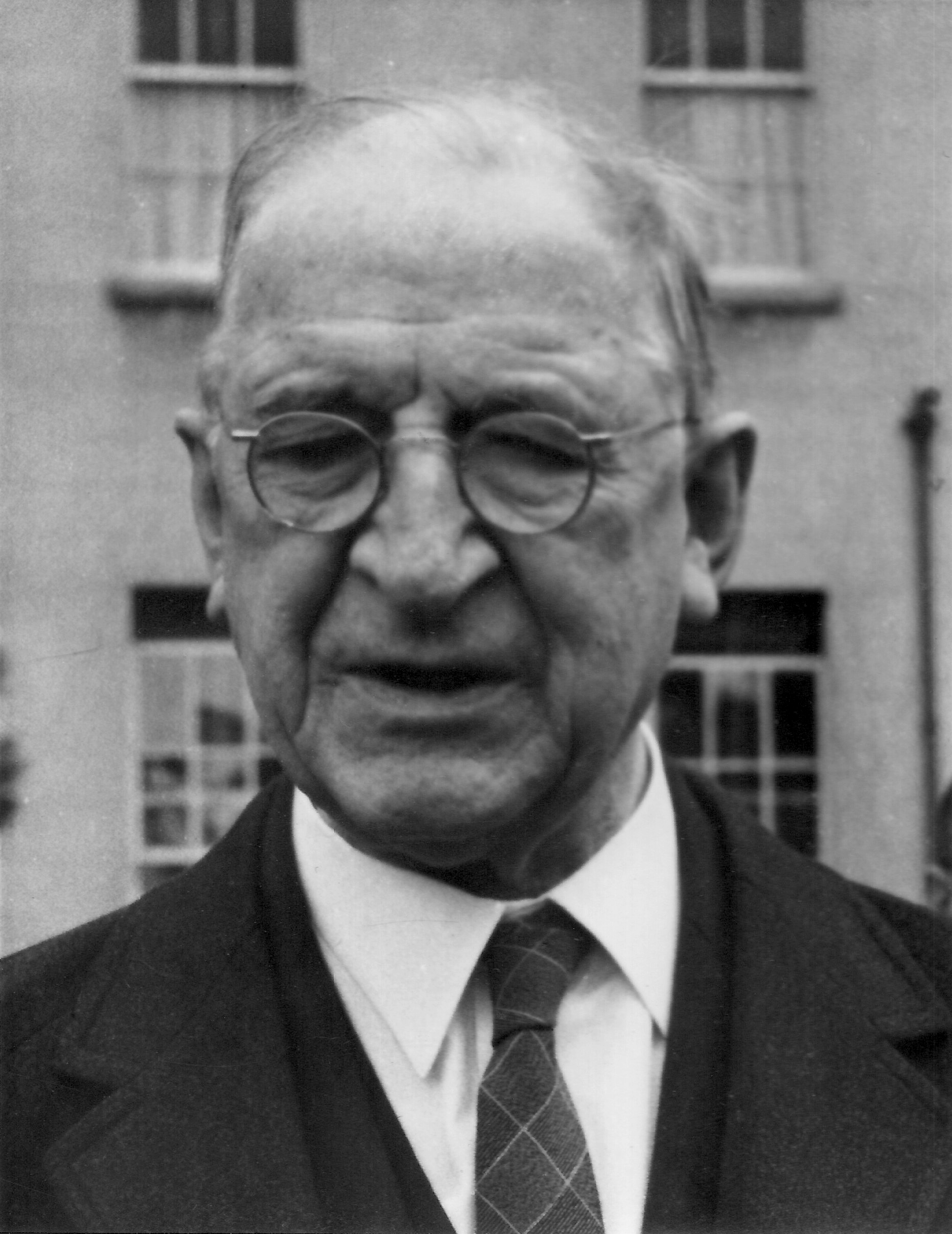
De Valera in the 1960s as President of Ireland

While Fianna Fáil remained popular among the electorate, 75-year-old de Valera had begun to be seen by the electorate as too old and out of touch to remain as head of government. At the urging of party officials, de Valera decided to retire from government and the Dáil and instead seek the presidency of Ireland. He won the 1959 presidential election on 17 June 1959 and resigned as Taoiseach, Leader of Fianna Fáil and a TD for Clare, six days later, handing over power to Seán Lemass.

De Valera was inaugurated as President of Ireland on 25 June 1959. By that stage he was "nearly blind", according to Down GAA captain Kevin Mussen who met him after the 1960 All-Ireland Senior Football Championship final and considered him "not a desperately warm sort of man". De Valera was re-elected President in 1966 aged 84, which until 2013 was a world record for the oldest elected head of state. At his retirement in 1973 at the age of 90, he was the oldest head of state in the world. When he stepped down as president, he ended 55 consecutive years as an elected official.

As President of Ireland, de Valera received many state visits, including the 1963 visit of the US president John F. Kennedy. Five months later de Valera attended the state funeral for Kennedy in Washington, D.C., and accompanied a group of 24 Defence Forces cadets who performed a silent drill at his gravesite. In June 1964, he returned to Washington, D.C., as the second President of Ireland to address the United States Congress.

In 1966, the Dublin Jewish community arranged the planting and dedication of the Éamon de Valera Forest in Israel, near Nazareth, in recognition of his support for Ireland's Jews.

In January 1969, de Valera became the first President of Ireland to address both houses of the Oireachtas, to mark the fiftieth anniversary of the foundation of Dáil Éireann.

In 1969, seventy-three countries sent goodwill messages to NASA for the historic first lunar landing. These messages still rest on the lunar surface. De Valera's message on behalf of Ireland stated, "May God grant that the skill and courage which have enabled man to alight upon the Moon will enable him, also, to secure peace and happiness upon the Earth and avoid the danger of self-destruction."

== Death ==
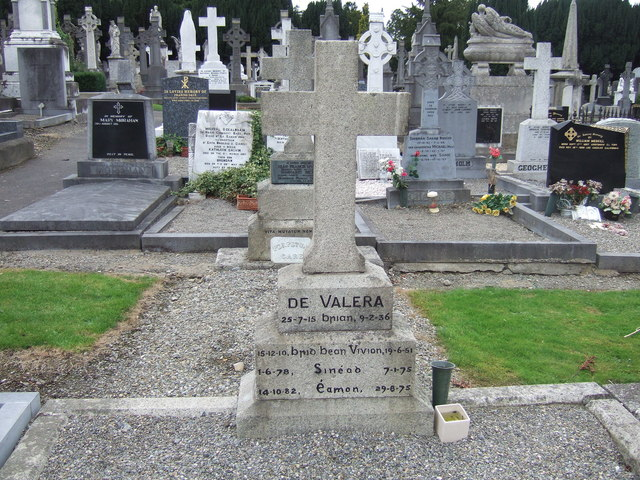
Éamon de Valera's grave in Glasnevin Cemetery in Dublin. His wife, Sinéad, and son, Brian (who was killed in a horse-riding accident in 1936) are buried there also.

Éamon de Valera died from pneumonia and heart failure in Linden Convalescent Home, Blackrock, Dublin, on 29 August 1975, aged 92. His wife, Sinéad de Valera, four years his senior, had died the previous January, on the eve of their 65th wedding anniversary. His body lay in state at Dublin Castle and was given a full state funeral on 3 September at St Mary's Pro-Cathedral, which was broadcast on national television. Over 200,000 people reportedly lined the three-mile funeral route from Dublin city centre to Glasnevin Cemetery. He is buried in Glasnevin alongside his wife and son Brian.

== Legacy ==
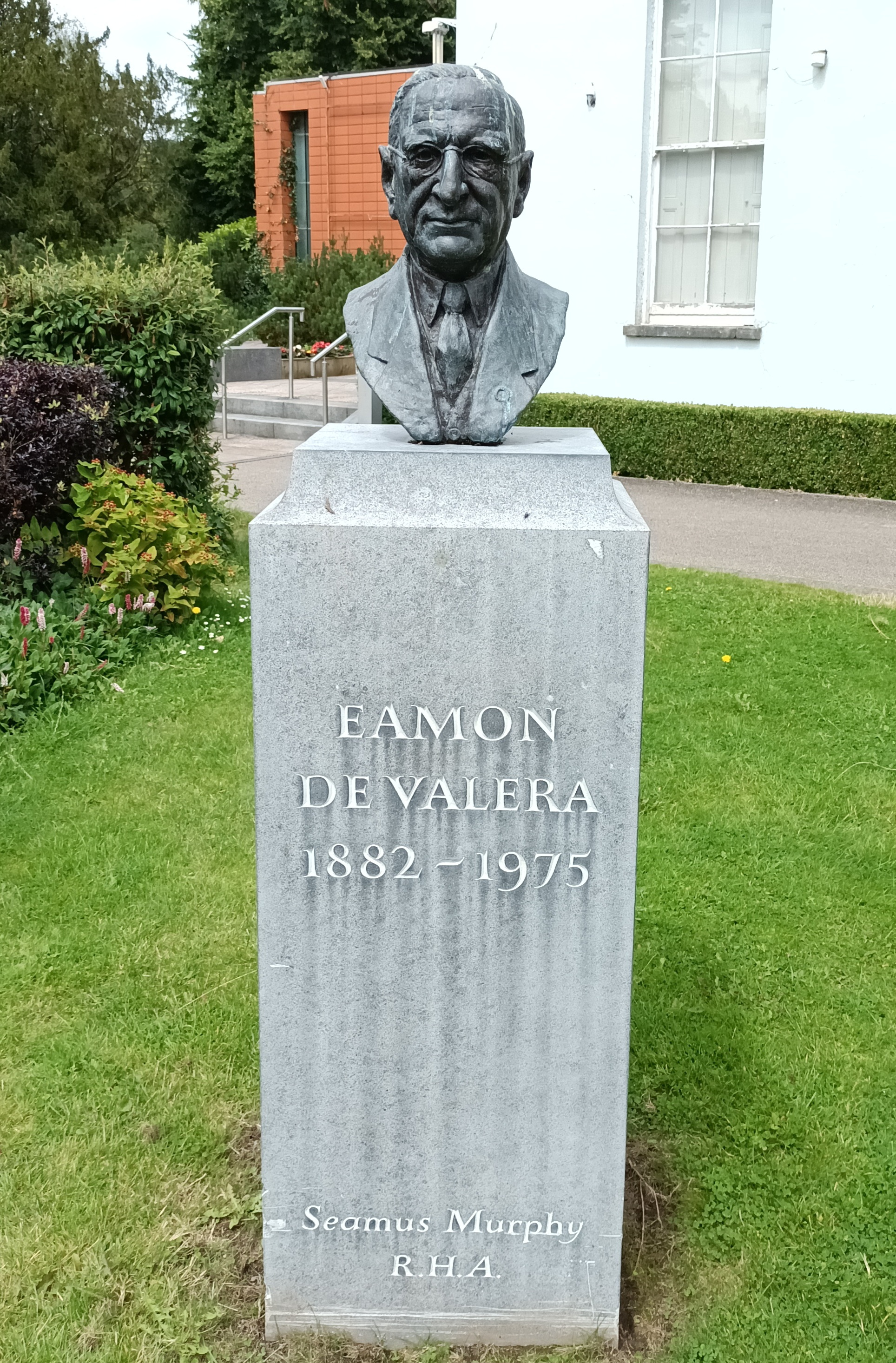
Bust of De Valera in Fitzgerald's Park, Cork

De Valera's political creed evolved from militant republicanism to social and cultural conservatism.

Ireland's dominant political personality for many decades, de Valera received numerous honours. He was elected Chancellor of the National University of Ireland in 1921, holding the post until his death. Pope John XXIII bestowed on him the Order of Christ (KSC). He received honorary degrees from universities in Ireland and abroad. In 1968, he was elected a Fellow of the Royal Society (FRS), a recognition of his lifelong interest in mathematics. He also served as a member of the Parliament of Northern Ireland (for Down from 1921 to 1929 and for South Down from 1933 to 1937), although he held to the republican policy of abstentionism and did not take his seat in Stormont.

De Valera was criticised for becoming co-owner of one of Ireland's most influential group of newspapers, Irish Press Newspapers, funded by numerous small investors who received no dividend for decades. De Valera is alleged by critics to have helped keep Ireland under the influence of Catholic conservatism. De Valera rejected, however, demands by organisations like Maria Duce that Roman Catholicism be made the state religion of Ireland, just as he rejected demands by the Irish Christian Front for the Irish Free State to support Francisco Franco during the Spanish Civil War.

De Valera's preoccupation with his part in history, and his need to explain and justify it, are reflected in innumerable ways. His faith in historians as trustworthy guardians of his reputation was not absolute. He made many attempts to influence their views and to adjust and refine the historical record whenever he felt this portrayed him, his allies or his cause inaccurately or unfavourably to his mind, these could often mean the same thing. He extended these endeavours to encompass the larger Irish public. An important function of his newspaper group, the Irish Press group, was to rectify what he saw as the errors and omissions of a decade in which he had been the subject of largely hostile commentary.

In recent decades, his role in Irish history has no longer been unequivocally seen by historians as a positive one, and a biography by Tim Pat Coogan alleges that his failures outweigh his achievements, with de Valera's reputation declining while that of his great rival in the 1920s, Michael Collins, was rising. A more recent 2007 work on de Valera by historian Diarmaid Ferriter presents a more positive picture of de Valera's legacy. Bertie Ahern, at a book launch for Diarmaid Ferriter's biography of de Valera, described de Valera's achievements in political leadership during the formative years of the state:

One of de Valera's finest hours was his regrouping of the Republican side after defeat in the civil war, and setting his followers on an exclusively peaceful and democratic path, along which he later had to confront both domestic Fascism and the IRA. He became a democratic statesman, not a dictator. He did not purge the civil service of those who had served his predecessors but made the best use of the talent available.

A notable failure was his attempt to reverse the provision of the 1937 Constitution in relation to the electoral system. On retiring as Taoiseach in 1959, he proposed that the Proportional Representation system enshrined in that constitution should be replaced. De Valera argued that Proportional Representation had been responsible for the instability that had characterised much of the post-war period. A constitutional referendum to ratify this was defeated by the people.

One aspect of de Valera's legacy is that since the foundation of the state, a de Valera has nearly always served in Dáil Éireann. Éamon de Valera served until 1959, and his son, Vivion de Valera, was a Teachta Dála (TD) from 1945 to 1981. Éamon Ó Cuív, his grandson, served as a member of the Dáil from 1992 to 2024 (previously having served in the Seanad from 1989 to 1992) with one stint as deputy leader of Fianna Fáil, while his granddaughter, Síle de Valera, is also former TD, with both having served in ministries in the Irish Government.

=== Catholic social policy ===
Éamon de Valera's heraldry as knight of the Supreme Order of Christ

In 1931, de Valera said in the Dáil:

I believe that every citizen in this country is entitled to his share of public appointments, and that there should not be discrimination on the ground of religion, discrimination, mind you, in the sense that because a person was of a particular religion, religion should not be made an excuse for denying a person an appointment for which he or she was fully qualified. Then there comes the question, what are qualifications? If I thought that the principle that the librarian in a Catholic community should be Catholic was a new principle, introduced merely to deny a Protestant an appointment, I would vote against it, but I know from my youth that it is not so. ... if I had a vote on a local body, and if there were two qualified people who had to deal with a Catholic community, and if one was a Catholic and the other a Protestant, I would unhesitatingly vote for the Catholic. Let us be clear and let us know where we are.

Ryle Dwyer, writing in 2008, said "If those were his honest views, one could also say without hesitation that the Long Fellow was a bigot. But, in fact, he was just playing the role of a political hypocrite. It was cynical, but it should be stressed that he behaved responsibly in this regard when he came to power."

De Valera led Fianna Fáil to adopt conservative social policies since he believed devoutly that the Catholic Church and the family were central to Irish identity. He added clauses to the new Constitution of Ireland (1937) to "guard with special care the institution of marriage" and prohibit divorce. His constitution also recognised "the special position" of the Catholic Church and recognised other denominations including the Church of Ireland and Jewish congregations, while guaranteeing the religious freedom of all citizens; however, he resisted an attempt to make Roman Catholicism the state religion and his constitution forbids the establishment of a state religion. His policies were welcomed by a largely devout, conservative and rural electorate. The unenforceable articles in the constitution which reinforced the traditional view that a woman's place was in the home further illustrate the direction in which Ireland was moving. An act of 1935 prohibited the importation or sale of contraceptives. The most rigorous censorship laws in Western Europe complete the picture.

The specific recognition of Roman Catholicism was deleted by the Fifth Amendment of the Constitution of Ireland (1973) and the prohibition of divorce was removed by the Fifteenth Amendment of the Constitution of Ireland (1996). Although the Irish Supreme Court declared in 1973 that the 1935 contraception legislation was not repugnant to the Constitution and therefore remained valid, subsequent laws have liberalised the use of contraception (see Contraception in the Republic of Ireland).

== In popular culture ==
De Valera's portrait illustrated the front cover of the 25 March 1940 issue of Time magazine accompanying the article Eire: Prime Minister of Freedom.

He has been portrayed by:

- Andre Van Gyseghem in a 1970 episode of ITV Playhouse entitled "Would You Look at Them Smashing all Those Lovely Windows?"
- Sonn Connaughton in a 1981 episode of The Life and Times of David Lloyd George entitled "Win or Lose".
- Barry McGovern in the 1991 TV movie The Treaty, about the Anglo-Irish Treaty.
- Arthur Riordan in the 1990s Network 2 television show Nighthawks.
- Alan Rickman in the 1996 film Michael Collins, which depicts the events surrounding Ireland's struggle for independence from Britain.
- Andrew Connolly in the 2001 TV mini-series Rebel Heart concerning the 1916 Rising.
- Stephen Mullan in the 2016 RTÉ One mini-series Rebellion.

== Governments ==
The following governments were led by de Valera:

- 2nd ministry of the Irish Republic
- 3rd ministry of the Irish Republic
- 6th executive council of the Irish Free State
- 7th executive council of the Irish Free State
- 8th executive council of the Irish Free State
- 1st government of Ireland
- 2nd government of Ireland
- 3rd government of Ireland
- 4th government of Ireland
- 6th government of Ireland
- 8th government of Ireland

== See also ==
- List of members of the Oireachtas imprisoned during the Irish revolutionary period
- List of people on the postage stamps of Ireland
- Éamon de Valera Forest

== Sources ==
- Bew, Paul (2007). Ireland: the politics of enmity, 1789–2006. Oxford.

Parliament of the United Kingdom
Preceded by Willie Redmond (Irish Parliamentary Party)	Member of Parliament for Clare East; 1917–1922	Constituency abolished
Preceded by John Dillon (Irish Parliamentary Party)	Member of Parliament for Mayo East; 1918–1922	Constituency abolished
Parliament of Northern Ireland
New constituency	Member of Parliament for Down; 1921–1929; With: J. M. Andrews; James Craig; Thomas Lavery; Robert McBride; Thomas McMullan; Harry Mulholland; Patrick O'Neill	Constituency abolished
Preceded by John Henry Collins (Nationalist Party)	Member of Parliament for South Down; 1933–1938	Succeeded by James Brown (Ulster Unionist Party)
Oireachtas
New constituency	Teachta Dála for Clare East; 1918–1921	Constituency abolished
New constituency	Teachta Dála for Mayo East; 1918–1921	Constituency abolished
Political offices
Preceded by Cathal Brugha	President of Dáil Éireann; 1919–1921	Succeeded by Himself as President of the Republic
Preceded by Himself as President of Dáil Éireann	President of the Irish Republic; 1921–1922	Succeeded by Arthur Griffith as President of Dáil Éireann
Preceded by Thomas Johnson	Leader of the Opposition; 1927–1932	Succeeded by W. T. Cosgrave
Preceded by José Matos Pacheco	President of the League of Nations Council; 1932	Succeeded by Pompeo Aloisi
Preceded by W. T. Cosgrave	President of the Executive Council; 1932–1937	Succeeded by Himself as Taoiseach
New office	Taoiseach; 1937–1948	Succeeded by John A. Costello
Preceded by Patrick McGilligan	Minister for External Affairs; 1932–1948	Succeeded by Seán MacBride
Preceded by Aga Khan III	President of the League of Nations Assembly; 1938	Succeeded by Carl Joachim Hambro
Preceded by Richard Mulcahy	Leader of the Opposition; 1948–1951	Succeeded by John A. Costello
Preceded by John A. Costello	Taoiseach; 1951–1954	Succeeded by John A. Costello
Preceded by John A. Costello	Leader of the Opposition; 1954–1957	Succeeded by John A. Costello
Preceded by John A. Costello	Taoiseach; 1957–1959	Succeeded by Seán Lemass
Preceded by Seán T. O'Kelly	President of Ireland; 1959–1973	Succeeded by Erskine H. Childers
Party political offices
Preceded by Arthur Griffith	President of Sinn Féin; 1917–1926	Succeeded by John J. O'Kelly
New political party	Leader of Fianna Fáil; 1926–1959	Succeeded by Seán Lemass
Academic offices
Preceded by William Walsh	Chancellor of the National University of Ireland; 1921–1975	Succeeded by T. K. Whitaker
Titles in pretence
Loss of title His own resignation on 7 January 1922	— TITULAR — President of the Irish Republic; 1922–1926	Succeeded by Art O'Connor

Dáil	Election	Deputy (Party)	Deputy (Party)	Deputy (Party)	Deputy (Party)	Deputy (Party)
2nd	1921	Éamon de Valera (SF)	Seán Liddy (SF)	Brian O'Higgins (SF)	Patrick Brennan (SF)	4 seats 1921–1923
3rd	1922	Éamon de Valera (AT-SF)	Seán Liddy (PT-SF)	Brian O'Higgins (AT-SF)	Patrick Brennan (PT-SF)	4 seats 1921–1923
4th	1923	Éamon de Valera (Rep)	Conor Hogan (FP)	Brian O'Higgins (Rep)	Patrick Hogan (Lab)	Eoin MacNeill (CnaG)
5th	1927 (Jun)	Éamon de Valera (FF)	Thomas Falvey (FP)	Patrick Houlihan (FF)	Patrick Hogan (Lab)	Patrick Kelly (CnaG)
6th	1927 (Sep)	Éamon de Valera (FF)	Martin Sexton (FF)	Patrick Houlihan (FF)	Patrick Hogan (Lab)	Patrick Kelly (CnaG)
7th	1932	Éamon de Valera (FF)	Martin Sexton (FF)	Seán O'Grady (FF)	Patrick Hogan (Lab)	Patrick Burke (CnaG)
8th	1933	Éamon de Valera (FF)	Patrick Houlihan (FF)	Seán O'Grady (FF)	Patrick Hogan (Lab)	Patrick Burke (CnaG)
9th	1937	Éamon de Valera (FF)	Thomas Burke (FP)	Seán O'Grady (FF)	Patrick Hogan (Lab)	Patrick Burke (FG)
10th	1938	Éamon de Valera (FF)	Thomas Burke (FP)	Seán O'Grady (FF)	Peter O'Loghlen (FF)	Patrick Burke (FG)
11th	1943	Éamon de Valera (FF)	Thomas Burke (FP)	Seán O'Grady (FF)	Patrick Hogan (Lab)	Patrick Burke (FG)
12th	1944	Éamon de Valera (FF)	Thomas Burke (FP)	Seán O'Grady (FF)	Peter O'Loghlen (FF)	Patrick Burke (FG)
12th	1945 by-election	Éamon de Valera (FF)	Thomas Burke (FP)	Seán O'Grady (FF)	Peter O'Loghlen (FF)	Patrick Shanahan (FF)
13th	1948	Éamon de Valera (FF)	Thomas Burke (FP)	Seán O'Grady (FF)	Patrick Hogan (Lab)	4 seats 1948–1969
14th	1951	Éamon de Valera (FF)	William Murphy (FG)	Patrick Hillery (FF)	Patrick Hogan (Lab)	4 seats 1948–1969
15th	1954	Éamon de Valera (FF)	William Murphy (FG)	Patrick Hillery (FF)	Patrick Hogan (Lab)	4 seats 1948–1969
16th	1957	Éamon de Valera (FF)	William Murphy (FG)	Patrick Hillery (FF)	Patrick Hogan (Lab)	4 seats 1948–1969
16th	1959 by-election	Seán Ó Ceallaigh (FF)	William Murphy (FG)	Patrick Hillery (FF)	Patrick Hogan (Lab)	4 seats 1948–1969
17th	1961	Seán Ó Ceallaigh (FF)	William Murphy (FG)	Patrick Hillery (FF)	Patrick Hogan (Lab)	4 seats 1948–1969
18th	1965	Seán Ó Ceallaigh (FF)	William Murphy (FG)	Patrick Hillery (FF)	Patrick Hogan (Lab)	4 seats 1948–1969
18th	1968 by-election	Seán Ó Ceallaigh (FF)	Sylvester Barrett (FF)	Patrick Hillery (FF)	Patrick Hogan (Lab)	4 seats 1948–1969
19th	1969	Frank Taylor (FG)	Sylvester Barrett (FF)	Patrick Hillery (FF)	3 seats 1969–1981	
20th	1973	Frank Taylor (FG)	Sylvester Barrett (FF)	Brendan Daly (FF)	3 seats 1969–1981	
21st	1977	Frank Taylor (FG)	Sylvester Barrett (FF)	Brendan Daly (FF)	3 seats 1969–1981	
22nd	1981	Madeleine Taylor (FG)	Sylvester Barrett (FF)	Brendan Daly (FF)	Bill Loughnane (FF)	4 seats since 1981
23rd	1982 (Feb)	Donal Carey (FG)	Sylvester Barrett (FF)	Brendan Daly (FF)	Bill Loughnane (FF)	4 seats since 1981
24th	1982 (Nov)	Donal Carey (FG)	Sylvester Barrett (FF)	Brendan Daly (FF)	Madeleine Taylor-Quinn (FG)	4 seats since 1981
25th	1987	Donal Carey (FG)	Síle de Valera (FF)	Brendan Daly (FF)	Madeleine Taylor-Quinn (FG)	4 seats since 1981
26th	1989	Donal Carey (FG)	Síle de Valera (FF)	Brendan Daly (FF)	Madeleine Taylor-Quinn (FG)	4 seats since 1981
27th	1992	Donal Carey (FG)	Síle de Valera (FF)	Tony Killeen (FF)	Moosajee Bhamjee (Lab)	4 seats since 1981
28th	1997	Donal Carey (FG)	Síle de Valera (FF)	Tony Killeen (FF)	Brendan Daly (FF)	4 seats since 1981
29th	2002	Pat Breen (FG)	Síle de Valera (FF)	Tony Killeen (FF)	James Breen (Ind.)	4 seats since 1981
30th	2007	Pat Breen (FG)	Timmy Dooley (FF)	Tony Killeen (FF)	Joe Carey (FG)	4 seats since 1981
31st	2011	Pat Breen (FG)	Timmy Dooley (FF)	Michael McNamara (Lab)	Joe Carey (FG)	4 seats since 1981
32nd	2016	Pat Breen (FG)	Timmy Dooley (FF)	Michael Harty (Ind.)	Joe Carey (FG)	4 seats since 1981
33rd	2020	Violet-Anne Wynne (SF)	Cathal Crowe (FF)	Michael McNamara (Ind.)	Joe Carey (FG)	4 seats since 1981
34th	2024	Donna McGettigan (SF)	Cathal Crowe (FF)	Timmy Dooley (FF)	Joe Cooney (FG)	4 seats since 1981
