= England's difficulty is Ireland's opportunity =

"England's difficulty is Ireland's opportunity" (Irish: Nuair a bhíonn deacracht ag Sasana, bíonn deis ag Éirinn) is an Irish nationalist phrase which long served as a "rallying cry" for Irish people who desired political independence. It was popular across the political spectrum of Irish nationalism. In 1868, The London Review of Politics described it as "the meaning of Fenianism".

== Origin ==
The phrase was first used by Daniel O'Connell, an Irish politician and campaigner for Catholic emancipation. Later, the phrase became associated with John Mitchel.

== Reactions ==
On several occasions, Irish nationalists took advantage of crises in Britain to launch rebellions. However, for various reasons they were unable to take advantage of the Indian Rebellion of 1857. When the First World War broke out in 1914, it was perceived as an opportunity for a rising (which materialized in 1916). In the Emergency during World War II, some Irish republicans repurposed the phrase in advocacy of an alliance with Nazi Germany on the basis that it was at war with the United Kingdom. According to a 1998 article in Irish America, the motto "didn't always work successfully for the Irish".

Some Irish nationalists, including the Irish Republican Brotherhood, rejected the idea, believing that bloody conflict was more likely to draw attention to their cause and help them achieve their aims. O'Donovan Rossa complained that anyone who employed the phrase was a "fraud" and in practice used it as an excuse to do nothing while supposedly awaiting the 'difficulty', as they did not actually take advantage of the "opportunities" provided by England's difficulties when they later occurred. In a biography of James Stephens, Marta Ramón wrote that the unwritten coda of the motto was often "let's bide our time". Stephens, however, rejected that idea.

Although it was typically used in a hostile sense by those who perceived England's and Ireland's interests to be intrinsically opposed to one another, Sir Henry Christopher Grattan-Bellew proposed in an 1898 article in the New Ireland Review that the phrase be redefined in a "friendlier and more constitutional sense" to mean that Ireland could relieve England's difficulty for mutual benefit.

Seamus Heaney wrote a poem titled "England's Difficulty" which appeared in Stations, in which he asserted that during the Troubles, the opportunity resulting from England's difficulty was actually a source of trouble for many Irish people, who, akin to double agents, were torn between multiple loyalties.
