= Catherine Coll =

Mother of Éamon de Valera (1856–1932)

- Born: Catherine Coll; 21 December 1856; Bruree, County Limerick, Ireland
- Died: 12 June 1932 (aged 75); Rochester, New York, U.S.
- Resting place: Holy Sepulchre Cemetery, Rochester, New York
- Known for: Mother of Éamon de Valera
- Spouse(s): Charles Wheelwright (m. 1888; d. 1929)
- Children: 3, including Éamon

Catherine (Kate) Wheelwright (née Coll; 21 December 1856 – 12 June 1932) was the mother of Irish statesman and politician Éamon de Valera, who served as President of Ireland and Taoiseach. She was a nurse by profession.

== Biography ==
Catherine Coll was born in Bruree, County Limerick. She emigrated on the SS Nevada to New York City, New York, in 1879. She first took a job with a wealthy French family that was living in Manhattan. This is where she allegedly met Juan Vivion de Valera (born 1853), Spanish sculptor who came to the home of her employers to give music lessons to the children. Though de Valera's official biography (Longford/O'Neill, Hutchinson, London, 1970) states that his parents were married at St. Patrick's in Greenville, New Jersey, on 19 September 1881, the parish records show no record of any Coll–de Valera wedding there or at any church, nor were any civil records found, during the period from 1875 to 1887. Éamon de Valera later instigated searches which found nothing.

The New York State records contain two birth certificates. The first, registered on 10 November 1882, gives the child's name as George De Valero. The second was a "corrected certificate" which was "approved by Commissioner of Health" on 30 June 1916. It is in this second certificate that the first name is given as Edward and the surname as de Valera.

It was alleged that Vivion de Valera, always in poor health, left his young family behind him and traveled to Colorado, hoping that perhaps the healthier air would help him out only to die within a few months. However, not merely is there no record of the wedding, but no record exists of the existence of a "Juan Vivion de Valera" anywhere in the United States: no birth certificate, no baptismal certificate, no wedding certificate, and no death certificate. While it was possible that he was born abroad and so either had a foreign birth certificate or was not registered, the absence of a death certificate for someone stated definitely in Éamon de Valera's family history to have died in the United States has puzzled researchers. Scholars have questioned whether he ever existed.

Kate later married a British coachman, Charles Wheelwright, on 7 May 1888, who converted to Roman Catholicism for her, and she gave birth to a daughter Ann, and a son, Thomas, who would later become a Catholic priest. They moved to Rochester, New York. The closeness of the marriage to her supposed first husband's death is again pointed to as supporting the theory that the first marriage had never actually existed, and was just a cover story to explain her pregnancy. Coll sent her young son (later known as Éamon) back to live with his grandmother and uncle in Bruree prior to her marriage to Wheelwright. She never brought him back to live with her. Later in his life, Éamon de Valera would remember occasional visits from, as he remembered and described her, a "woman in black", who he had thought might have been his mother.

The 1881 United Kingdom census for St George Hanover Square, Westminster, lists Charles Wheelwright, aged 27, as an unmarried coachman domestic servant living at the house of a man called Edward Devall, aged 65, a coachman. This coincidence has suggested a possible connection between Wheelwright and the arrival of a real or imaginary Devall in New York. However, when Wheelwright was naturalized as a US citizen in 1894, he gave the date of his arrival in the US as August 9th, 1882.

The Wheelwrights were staunch supporters of de Valera and his cause for the establishment of the Irish Republic. In 1916, Mrs. Wheelwright campaigned successfully for the suspension of the death sentence imposed by a British court on her son, a U.S. citizen by virtue of his birth on American soil.

Charles Wheelwright died in 1929, and Catherine Wheelwright died on 12 June 1932. Both are buried at the Holy Sepulchre Cemetery in Rochester, New York.

Although married for many years to Wheelwright, Catherine is generally referred to in biographies as Catherine (or Kate) Coll.

== In public records ==
The birth of a daughter named Annie Wheelwright was registered as happening in Manhattan, New York City on 13 July 1889, the father's name being Charles Wheelwright (aged 32) and the mother's "Katie Kall" (aged 29).

The 1910 U.S. Census for Rochester records Charles Wheelwright as a coachman and Kate Wheelwright as a nurse, living in the household of a Warham H. Whitney. The ages of both are given as "52", and the length of their marriage as 21 years. Charles is stated as born in the UK, his wife in Ireland, and their years of arrival in the U.S. are given as 1884 and 1879 respectively.

The 1920 U.S. Census for Rochester records a Charles and Katherine Wheelwright living in their own household at 18 Brighton Street, Charles being a factory worker and Katherine of no occupation, their places of birth stated as before, but their ages are given as 49 and 50 respectively. These Wheelwrights are stated to be naturalized citizens.

== Sources ==
- Tim Pat Coogan, De Valera: Long Fellow, Long Shadow (Hutchinson, 1993)
