= List of MPs elected in the 1892 United Kingdom general election =

1892–1895 Parliament of the United Kingdom
←	1886–1892 Parliament	1895–1900 Parliament	→
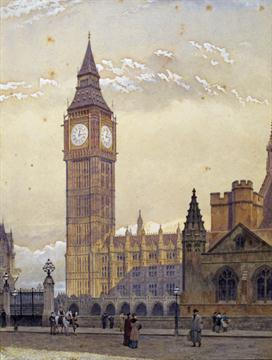
- The Palace of Westminster in 1894

Overview
- Legislative body: Parliament of the United Kingdom
- Jurisdiction: United Kingdom
- Meeting place: Palace of Westminster
- Term: 26 July 1892 – 13 July 1895
- Election: 1892 United Kingdom general election
- Government: Rosebery ministry; Fourth Gladstone ministry (until 1894)

House of Commons
- Members: 670
- Speaker: Arthur Peel
- Leader: Archibald Primrose, 5th Earl of Rosebery; William Ewart Gladstone (until 1894)
- Prime Minister: Archibald Primrose, 5th Earl of Rosebery; William Ewart Gladstone (until 1894)
- Leader of the Opposition: Arthur Balfour
- Third-party leader: Justin McCarthy
- Party control: Liberal Party (minority, dependent on INF support)

House of Lords
- Lord Chancellor: Farrer Herschell, 1st Baron Herschell
- Leader: Archibald Primrose, 5th Earl of Rosebery; John Wodehouse, 1st Earl of Kimberley (until 1894)
- Leader of the Opposition: Marquess of Salisbury

Crown-in-Parliament Victoria

Sessions
- 1st: 4 August 1892 – 18 August 1892
- 2nd: 31 January 1893 – 5 March 1894
- 3rd: 12 March 1894 – 25 August 1894
- 4th: 5 February 1895 – 6 July 1895

This is a list of members of Parliament (MPs) elected in the 1892 general election, held over several days from 4 July to 26 July 1892.

Party	Seats
Liberal Party	271
Conservative Party	251
Irish National Federation	72
Liberal Unionist Party	46
Irish Unionist	17
Irish National League	9
Independent Labour Party	3
Independent Liberal	1

Table of contents:

A B C D E F G H I J K L M N O P Q R S T U V W X Y Z By-elections

== A ==
Constituency	MP	Party
Aberdeen, North	William Hunter	Liberal
Aberdeen, South	James Bryce	Liberal
Aberdeenshire, East	Peter Esslemont	Liberal
Aberdeenshire, West	Robert Farquharson	Liberal
Abingdon	Philip Wroughton	Conservative
Accrington	Joseph Leese	Liberal
Altrincham	Coningsby Disraeli	Conservative
Andover	William Wither Bramston Beach	Conservative
Anglesey	Thomas Lewis	Liberal
Antrim, East	James McCalmont	Irish Unionist
Antrim, Mid	Robert O'Neill	Irish Unionist
Antrim, North	Charles Connor	Irish Unionist
Antrim, South	William Ellison-Macartney	Irish Unionist
Appleby	Sir Joseph Savory, Bt	Conservative
Arfon	William Rathbone	Liberal
Argyllshire	Donald Horne Macfarlane	Liberal (Crofters')
Armagh, Mid	Dunbar Barton	Irish Unionist
Armagh, North	Edward James Saunderson	Irish Unionist
Armagh South	Edward McHugh	Irish National Federation
Ashburton	Charles Seale-Hayne	Liberal
Ashford	Laurence Hardy	Conservative
Ashton-under-Lyne	John Addison	Conservative
Aston Manor	George Grice-Hutchinson	Conservative
Aylesbury	Baron Ferdinand de Rothschild	Liberal Unionist
Ayr District of Burghs	William Birkmyre	Liberal
Ayrshire, North	Thomas Cochrane	Liberal Unionist
Ayrshire, South	Eugene Wason	Liberal
== B ==
Banbury	Sir Bernhard Samuelson, Bt	Liberal
Banffshire	Robert Duff	Liberal
Barkston Ash	Robert Gunter	Conservative
Barnard Castle	Sir Joseph Pease, Bt	Liberal
Barnsley	William Compton	Liberal
Barnstaple	Alfred Billson	Liberal
Barrow-in-Furness	Charles Cayzer	Conservative
Basingstoke	Arthur Frederick Jeffreys	Conservative
Bassetlaw	Sir Frederick Milner, Bt	Conservative
Bath (two members)	Wyndham Murray	Conservative
Bath (two members)	Edmond Wodehouse	Liberal Unionist
Battersea	John Burns	Independent Labour
Bedford	Samuel Whitbread	Liberal
Belfast East	Gustav Wilhelm Wolff	Irish Unionist
Belfast North	Sir Edward Harland, Bt	Irish Unionist
Belfast South	William Johnston	Irish Unionist
Belfast West	H. O. Arnold-Forster	Liberal Unionist
Bermondsey	Reuben Barrow	Liberal
Berwick-upon-Tweed	Sir Edward Grey, Bt	Liberal
Berwickshire	Hon. Edward Marjoribanks	Liberal
Bethnal Green North East	George Howell	Liberal-Labour
Bethnal Green South West	Edward Pickersgill	Liberal
Bewdley	Alfred Baldwin	Conservative
Biggleswade	George W. E. Russell	Liberal
Birkenhead	Viscount Bury	Conservative
Birmingham Bordesley	Jesse Collings	Liberal Unionist
Birmingham Central	John Albert Bright	Liberal Unionist
Birmingham East	Henry Matthews	Conservative
Birmingham Edgbaston	George Dixon	Liberal Unionist
Birmingham North	William Kenrick	Liberal Unionist
Birmingham South	Joseph Powell-Williams	Liberal Unionist
Birmingham West	Joseph Chamberlain	Liberal Unionist
Birr	Bernard Charles Molloy	Irish National Federation
Bishop Auckland	James Mellor Paulton	Liberal
Blackburn (two seats)	William Hornby	Conservative
Blackburn (two seats)	William Coddington	Conservative
Blackpool	Sir Matthew White Ridley, Bt	Conservative
Bodmin	Leonard Courtney	Liberal Unionist
Bolton (two seats)	Herbert Shepherd-Cross	Conservative
Bolton (two seats)	Hon. Francis Charles Bridgeman	Conservative
Bootle	Thomas Sandys	Conservative
Boston	William Ingram	Liberal
Bosworth	Charles McLaren	Liberal
Bow and Bromley	John Macdonald	Liberal
Bradford Central	George Shaw-Lefevre	Liberal
Bradford East	William Sproston Caine	Liberal
Bradford West	Alfred Illingworth	Liberal
Brecknockshire	William Fuller-Maitland	Liberal
Brentford	James Bigwood	Conservative
Bridgwater	Edward Stanley	Conservative
Brigg	Samuel Danks Waddy	Liberal
Brighton (two members)	Gerald Loder	Conservative
Brighton (two members)	Sir William Marriott	Conservative
Bristol East	Sir Joseph Weston	Liberal
Bristol North	Charles Townsend	Liberal
Bristol South	Sir Edward Stock Hill	Conservative
Bristol West	Sir Michael Hicks Beach, Bt	Conservative
Brixton	Marquess of Carmarthen	Conservative
Buckingham	Herbert Leon	Liberal
Buckrose	Sir Angus Holden, Bt	Liberal
Burnley	Jabez Balfour	Liberal
Burton	Sydney Evershed	Liberal
Bury	Sir Henry James	Liberal Unionist
Bury St. Edmunds	Lord Francis Hervey	Conservative
Buteshire	Andrew Murray	Conservative
== C ==
Caithness-shire	Gavin Clark	Liberal (Crofters')
Camberwell North	Edward Hodson Bayley	Liberal
Camborne	Charles Conybeare	Liberal
Cambridge	Robert Uniacke-Penrose-Fitzgerald	Conservative
Cambridge University (two members)	Sir John Eldon Gorst	Conservative
Cambridge University (two members)	Sir Richard Claverhouse Jebb	Conservative
Canterbury	John Henniker Heaton	Conservative
Cardiff District	Sir Edward Reed	Liberal
Cardiganshire	William Bowen Rowlands	Liberal
Carlisle	William Gully	Liberal
County Carlow	John Hammond	Irish National Federation
Carmarthen District	Evan Rowland Jones	Liberal
Carmarthenshire East	Abel Thomas	Liberal
Carmarthenshire West	John Lloyd Morgan	Liberal
Carnarvon	David Lloyd George	Liberal
Cavan East	Samuel Young	Irish National Federation
Cavan West	Edmund Vesey Knox	Irish National Federation
Chatham	Lewis Vivian Loyd	Conservative
Chelmsford	Thomas Usborne	Conservative
Chelsea	Charles Whitmore	Conservative
Cheltenham	James Agg-Gardner	Conservative
Chertsey	Charles Harvey Combe	Conservative
Chester	Robert Yerburgh	Conservative
Chester-le-Street	James Joicey	Liberal
Chesterfield	Thomas Bayley	Liberal
Chesterton	Hugh Hoare	Liberal
Chichester	Lord Walter Gordon-Lennox	Conservative
Chippenham	Sir John Dickson-Poynder, Bt	Conservative
Chorley	Joseph Feilden	Conservative
Christchurch	Abel Henry Smith	Conservative
Cirencester	Arthur Winterbotham	Liberal
Clackmannan and Kinrossshire	John Balfour	Liberal
Clapham	Percy Thornton	Conservative
Clare East	Willie Redmond	Irish National League
Clare West	James Rochfort Maguire	Irish National League
Cleveland	Henry Fell Pease	Liberal
Clitheroe	Sir Ughtred Kay-Shuttleworth, Bt	Liberal
Cockermouth	Sir Wilfrid Lawson, Bt	Liberal
Colchester	Herbert Naylor-Leyland	Conservative
Colne Valley	Sir James Kitson, Bt	Liberal
Cork City (two members)	William O'Brien	Irish National Federation
Cork City (two members)	Maurice Healy	Irish National Federation
County Cork East	Anthony Donelan	Irish National Federation
County Cork Mid	Charles Kearns Deane Tanner	Irish National Federation
County Cork North	James Christopher Flynn	Irish National Federation
County Cork North East	William O'Brien	Irish National Federation
County Cork South	Edward Barry	Irish National Federation
County Cork South East	John Morrogh	Irish National Federation
County Cork West	James Gilhooly	Irish National Federation
Coventry	William Ballantine	Liberal
Crewe	Walter McLaren	Liberal
Cricklade	John Husband	Liberal
Croydon	Hon. Sidney Herbert	Conservative
== D ==
Darlington	Theodore Fry	Liberal
Dartford	Sir William Hart Dyke, Bt	Conservative
Darwen	Charles Huntington	Liberal
Denbigh District	George Thomas Kenyon	Conservative
Denbighshire East	Sir George Osborne Morgan, Bt	Liberal
Denbighshire West	John Roberts	Liberal
Deptford	Charles Darling	Conservative
Derby (two members)	Thomas Roe	Liberal
Derby (two members)	William Vernon Harcourt	Liberal
Derbyshire Mid	Sir James Alfred Jacoby	Liberal
Derbyshire North East	Thomas Bolton	Liberal
Derbyshire South	Harrington Evans Broad	Liberal
Derbyshire West	Victor Cavendish	Liberal Unionist
Devizes	Charles Hobhouse	Liberal
Devonport (2 members)	Hudson Kearley	Liberal
Devonport (2 members)	E. J. C. Morton	Liberal
Dewsbury	Mark Oldroyd	Liberal
Doncaster	Charles James Fleming	Liberal
Donegal East	Arthur O'Connor	Irish National Federation
Donegal North	John Mains	Irish National Federation
Donegal South	J. G. Swift MacNeill	Irish National Federation
Donegal West	Timothy Daniel Sullivan	Irish National Federation
Dorset East	Hon. Humphrey Sturt	Conservative
Dorset North	John Wingfield-Digby	Conservative
Dorset South	William Brymer	Conservative
Dorset West	Henry Richard Farquharson	Conservative
Dover	George Wyndham	Conservative
Down East	James Alexander Rentoul	Irish Unionist
Down North	Thomas Waring	Irish Unionist
Down South	Michael McCartan	Irish National Federation
Down West	Lord Arthur Hill	Irish Unionist
Droitwich	Richard Martin	Liberal Unionist
Dublin County North	J. J. Clancy	Irish National League
Dublin County South	Hon. Horace Plunkett	Irish Unionist
Dublin College Green	J. E. Kenny	Irish National League
Dublin Harbour	Timothy Harrington	Irish National League
Dublin St Patrick's	William Field	Irish National League
Dublin St Stephen's Green	William Kenny	Liberal Unionist
Dublin University (two members)	Edward Carson	Conservative
Dublin University (two members)	Hon. David Plunket	Conservative
Dudley	Brooke Robinson	Conservative
Dulwich	John Blundell Maple	Conservative
Dumbartonshire	John Sinclair	Liberal
Dumfries District of Burghs	Robert Reid	Liberal
Dumfriesshire	William Maxwell	Liberal Unionist
Dundee (two members)	Edmund Robertson	Liberal
Dundee (two members)	John Leng	Liberal
Durham	Matthew Fowler	Liberal
Durham Mid	John Wilson	Liberal-Labour
Durham North West	Llewellyn Atherley-Jones	Liberal
Durham South East	Joseph Richardson	Liberal
== E ==
Ealing	Lord George Hamilton	Conservative
East Grinstead	Hon. Alfred Gathorne-Hardy	Conservative
Eastbourne	Edward Field	Conservative
Eccles	Henry John Roby	Liberal
Eddisbury	Henry James Tollemache	Conservative
Edinburgh Central	William McEwan	Liberal
Edinburgh East	Robert Wallace	Liberal
Edinburgh South	Herbert Paul	Liberal
Edinburgh West	Viscount Wolmer	Liberal Unionist
Edinburgh and St Andrews Universities	Sir Charles Pearson	Conservative
Egremont	David Ainsworth	Liberal
Eifion	John Bryn Roberts	Liberal
Elgin District of Burghs	Alexander Asher	Liberal
Elgin and Nairnshires	John Seymour Keay	Liberal
Elland	Thomas Wayman	Liberal
Enfield	Henry Bowles	Conservative
Epping	Amelius Lockwood	Conservative
Epsom	Thomas Bucknill	Conservative
Eskdale	Robert Andrew Allison	Liberal
Essex South East	Carne Rasch	Conservative
Evesham	Sir Edmund Lechmere, Bt	Conservative
Exeter	Hon. Henry Northcote	Conservative
Eye	Francis Seymour Stevenson	Liberal
== F ==
Falkirk District of Burghs	Harry Smith	Liberal
Fareham	Sir Frederick Fitzwygram	Conservative
Faversham	Herbert Knatchbull-Hugessen	Conservative
Fermanagh North	Richard Dane	Irish Unionist
Fermanagh South	Patrick McGilligan	Irish National Federation
Fife East	H. H. Asquith	Liberal
Fife West	Augustine Birrell	Liberal
Finsbury Central	Dadabhai Naoroji	Liberal
Finsbury East	James Rowlands	Liberal-Labour
Flint	Herbert Lewis	Liberal
Flintshire	Samuel Smith	Liberal
Forest of Dean	Sir Charles Dilke, Bt	Liberal
Forfarshire	John Rigby	Liberal
Frome	John Barlow	Liberal
Fulham	William Hayes Fisher	Conservative
== G ==
Gainsborough	Joseph Bennett	Liberal
Galway Borough	John Pinkerton	Irish National Federation
Galway Connemara	Patrick James Foley	Irish National Federation
County Galway East	John Roche	Irish National Federation
County Galway North	John Philip Nolan	Irish National League
County Galway South	David Sheehy	Irish National Federation
Gateshead	Hon. Walter James	Liberal
Glamorganshire, East	Sir Alfred Thomas	Liberal
Glamorganshire Mid	Samuel Evans	Liberal
Glamorganshire, South	Arthur John Williams	Liberal
Glasgow and Aberdeen Universities	James Alexander Campbell	Conservative
Glasgow Blackfriars and Hutchesontown	Andrew Provand	Liberal
Glasgow Bridgeton	Sir George Trevelyan, Bt	Liberal
Glasgow Camlachie	Alexander Cross	Liberal Unionist
Glasgow Central	John George Alex Baird	Conservative
Glasgow College	Charles Cameron	Liberal
Glasgow St Rollox	Sir James Carmichael, Bt	Liberal
Glasgow Tradeston	Archibald Corbett	Liberal Unionist
Gloucester	Thomas Robinson	Liberal
Gorton	William Mather	Liberal
Govan	John Wilson	Liberal
Gower	David Randell	Liberal
Grantham	Henry Lopes	Conservative
Gravesend	James Dampier Palmer	Conservative
Great Grimsby	Henri Josse	Liberal
Great Yarmouth	James Marshall Moorsom	Liberal
Greenock	Sir Thomas Sutherland	Liberal Unionist
Greenwich	Thomas Boord	Conservative
Guildford	Hon. St John Brodrick	Conservative
== H ==
Hackney Central	Sir Andrew Scoble	Conservative
Hackney North	William Robert Bousfield	Conservative
Hackney South	Sir Charles Russell	Liberal
Haddingtonshire	Richard Haldane	Liberal
Haggerston	Randal Cremer	Liberal-Labour
Halifax (2 members)	Sir James Stansfeld	Liberal
Halifax (2 members)	Thomas Shaw	Liberal
Hallamshire	Sir Frederick Mappin, Bt	Liberal
Hammersmith	Walter Tuckfield Goldsworthy	Conservative
Hampstead	Edward Brodie Hoare	Conservative
Handsworth	Sir Henry Meysey-Thompson, Bt	Liberal Unionist
Hanley	William Woodall	Liberal
Harborough	John William Logan	Liberal
Harrow	William Ambrose	Conservative
Hartlepools, The	Christopher Furness	Liberal
Harwich	James Round	Conservative
Hastings	Wilson Noble	Conservative
Hawick District of Burghs	Thomas Shaw	Liberal
Henley	Francis Parker	Conservative
Hereford	William Grenfell	Liberal
Hertford	Abel Smith	Conservative
Hexham	Nathaniel Clayton	Conservative
Heywood	Thomas Snape	Liberal
High Peak	William Sidebottom	Conservative
Hitchin	George Hudson	Conservative
Holborn	Gainsford Bruce	Conservative
Holderness	George Bethell	Conservative
Holmfirth	Henry Wilson	Liberal
Honiton	Sir John Kennaway, Bt	Conservative
Horncastle	Hon. Edward Stanhope	Conservative
Hornsey	Henry Stephens	Conservative
Horsham	Sir Walter Barttelot, Bt	Conservative
Houghton-le-Spring	Henry Fenwick	Liberal
Howdenshire	William Wilson-Todd	Conservative
Hoxton	James Stuart	Liberal
Huddersfield	William Summers	Liberal
Huntingdon	Arthur Smith-Barry	Conservative
Hyde	Joseph Watson Sidebotham	Conservative
Hythe	Sir Edward Watkin, Bt	Independent Liberal
== I ==
Ilkeston	Sir Balthazar Foster	Liberal
Ince	Sam Woods	Liberal-Labour
Inverness District of Burghs	Gilbert Beith	Liberal
Inverness-shire	Donald MacGregor	Liberal (Crofters')
Ipswich (2 members)	Sir Charles Dalrymple, Bt	Conservative
Ipswich (2 members)	Lord Elcho	Conservative
Isle of Thanet	James Lowther	Conservative
Isle of Wight	Sir Richard Webster	Conservative
Islington East	Benjamin Cohen	Conservative
Islington North	Sir George Trout Bartley	Conservative
Islington South	Sir Albert Rollit	Conservative
Islington West	Thomas Lough	Liberal
== J ==
Jarrow	Sir Charles Palmer, Bt	Liberal
== K ==
Keighley	Isaac Holden	Liberal
Kendal	Josceline Bagot	Conservative
Kennington	Mark Hanbury Beaufoy	Liberal
Kensington North	Frederick Frye	Liberal
Kensington South	Sir Algernon Borthwick	Conservative
Kerry East	Jeremiah Sheehan	Irish National Federation
Kerry North	Thomas Sexton	Irish National Federation
Kerry South	Denis Kilbride	Irish National Federation
Kerry West	Sir Thomas Esmonde, Bt	Irish National Federation
Kidderminster	Sir Augustus Godson	Conservative
Kildare North	Patrick Kennedy	Irish National Federation
Kildare South	Matthew Minch	Irish National Federation
Kilkenny City	Thomas Bartholomew Curran	Irish National Federation
County Kilkenny North	Patrick McDermott	Irish National Federation
County Kilkenny South	Patrick Chance	Irish National Federation
Kilmarnock Burghs	Stephen Williamson	Liberal
Kincardineshire	John William Crombie	Liberal
King's Lynn	Thomas Gibson Bowles	Conservative
Kingston upon Hull Central	Seymour King	Conservative
Kingston upon Hull East	Clarence Smith	Liberal
Kingston upon Hull West	Charles Wilson	Liberal
Kingston-upon-Thames	Sir Richard Temple, Bt	Conservative
Kingswinford	Alexander Staveley Hill	Conservative
Kirkcaldy District of Burghs	James Dalziel	Liberal
Kirkcudbrightshire	Sir Mark MacTaggart-Stewart, Bt	Conservative
Knutsford	Hon. Alan Egerton	Conservative
== L ==
Lambeth North	Francis Coldwells	Liberal
Lanarkshire Mid	John Philipps	Liberal
Lanarkshire North East	Donald Crawford	Liberal
Lanarkshire North West	Graeme Whitelaw	Conservative
Lanarkshire South	James Hozier	Conservative
Lancaster	James Williamson	Liberal
Launceston	Thomas Owen	Liberal
Leeds Central	Gerald Balfour	Conservative
Leeds East	John Gane	Liberal
Leeds North	William Jackson	Conservative
Leeds South	Sir Lyon Playfair	Liberal
Leeds West	Herbert Gladstone	Liberal
Leek	Charles Bill	Conservative
Leicester (two members)	James Allanson Picton	Liberal
Leicester (two members)	Sir James Whitehead, Bt	Liberal
Leigh	Caleb Wright	Liberal
Leith District of Burghs	Ronald Munro-Ferguson	Liberal
Leitrim North	P. A. McHugh	Irish National Federation
Leitrim South	Jasper Tully	Irish National Federation
Leix	Mark MacDonnell	Irish National Federation
Leominster	James Rankin	Conservative
Lewes	Sir Henry Aubrey-Fletcher, Bt	Conservative
Lewisham	John Penn	Conservative
Lichfield	Leonard Darwin	Liberal Unionist
Limehouse	John Wallace	Liberal
Limerick City	Francis Arthur O'Keefe	Irish National Federation
County Limerick East	John Finucane	Irish National Federation
County Limerick West	Michael Austin	Irish National Federation
Lincoln	William Crosfield	Liberal
Linlithgowshire	Peter McLagan	Liberal
Liverpool Abercromby	William Lawrence	Conservative
Liverpool East Toxteth	Baron Henry de Worms	Conservative
Liverpool Everton	Sir John A. Willox	Conservative
Liverpool Exchange	Ralph Neville	Liberal
Liverpool Kirkdale	Sir George Baden-Powell	Conservative
Liverpool Scotland	T. P. O'Connor	Irish National Federation
Liverpool Walton	James Henry Stock	Conservative
Liverpool West Derby	William Cross	Conservative
Liverpool West Toxteth	Robert Houston	Conservative
City of London (two members)	Sir Reginald Hanson, Bt	Conservative
City of London (two members)	Alban Gibbs	Conservative
London University	Sir John Lubbock, Bt	Liberal Unionist
Londonderry City	John Ross	Irish Unionist
Londonderry North	Henry Mulholland	Irish Unionist
Londonderry South	Thomas Lea	Liberal Unionist
Longford North	Justin McCarthy	Irish National Federation
Longford South	Edward Blake	Irish National Federation
North Lonsdale	William Smith	Liberal
Loughborough	Edward Johnson-Ferguson	Liberal
Louth	Sir Robert Perks	Liberal
Louth North	Tim Healy	Irish National Federation
Louth South	Daniel Ambrose	Irish National Federation
Lowestoft	Harry Foster	Conservative
Ludlow	Robert Jasper More	Liberal Unionist
Luton	Cyril Flower	Liberal
== M ==
Macclesfield	William Bromley-Davenport	Conservative
Maidstone	Fiennes Cornwallis	Conservative
Maldon	Cyril Dodd	Liberal
Manchester East	Arthur Balfour	Conservative
Manchester North	Charles Schwann	Liberal
Manchester North East	Sir James Fergusson, Bt	Conservative
Manchester North West	Sir William Houldsworth, Bt	Conservative
Manchester South	Sir Henry Roscoe	Liberal
Manchester South West	Jacob Bright	Liberal
Mansfield	John Williams	Liberal
Marylebone East	Edmund Boulnois	Conservative
Marylebone West	Frederick Seager Hunt	Conservative
Mayo East	John Dillon	Irish National Federation
Mayo North	Daniel Crilly	Irish National Federation
Mayo South	J. F. X. O'Brien	Irish National Federation
Mayo West	John Deasy	Irish National Federation
Meath North	Michael Davitt	Irish National Federation
Meath South	Patrick Fulham	Irish National Federation
Medway	Charles Warde	Conservative
Melton	The Marquess of Granby	Conservative
Merionethshire	T. E. Ellis	Liberal
Merthyr Tydfil (two members)	David Alfred Thomas	Liberal
Merthyr Tydfil (two members)	William Pritchard Morgan	Liberal
Middlesbrough	Havelock Wilson	Independent Labour
Middleton	Charles Henry Hopwood	Liberal
Midlothian	William Ewart Gladstone	Liberal
Mile End	Spencer Charrington	Conservative
Monaghan North	Charles Diamond	Irish National Federation
Monaghan South	Florence O'Driscoll	Irish National Federation
Monmouth Boroughs	Albert Spicer	Liberal
Monmouthshire North	Thomas Phillips Price	Liberal
Monmouthshire South	Frederick Courtenay Morgan	Conservative
Monmouthshire West	Marshall Warmington	Liberal
Montgomery District	Pryce Pryce-Jones	Conservative
Montgomeryshire	Stuart Rendel	Liberal
Montrose District of Burghs	John Shiress Will	Liberal
Morley	Alfred Hutton	Liberal
Morpeth	Thomas Burt	Liberal-Labour
== N ==
New Forest	Hon. John Douglas-Scott-Montagu	Conservative
Newark	Viscount Newark	Conservative
Newbury	William George Mount	Conservative
Newcastle-upon-Tyne (2 members)	John Morley	Liberal
Newcastle-upon-Tyne (2 members)	Charles Frederick Hamond	Conservative
Newcastle-under-Lyme	William Allen	Liberal
Newington West	Cecil Norton	Liberal
Newmarket	George Newnes	Liberal
Newport	William Kenyon-Slaney	Conservative
Newry	Patrick Carvill	Irish National Federation
Newton	Hon. Thomas Legh	Conservative
Norfolk East	Sir Robert John Price	Liberal
Norfolk Mid	Clement Higgins	Liberal
Norfolk North	Herbert Cozens-Hardy	Liberal
Norfolk North West	Joseph Arch	Liberal-Labour
Norfolk South	Francis Taylor	Liberal Unionist
Norfolk South West	Thomas Hare	Conservative
Normanton	Benjamin Pickard	Liberal-Labour
Northampton (2 members)	Henry Labouchère	Liberal
Northampton (2 members)	Philip Manfield	Liberal
Northamptonshire East	Francis Channing	Liberal
Northamptonshire Mid	Hon. Charles Spencer	Liberal
Northamptonshire North	Lord Burghley	Conservative
Northamptonshire South	David Guthrie	Liberal
Northwich	John Brunner	Liberal
Norwich (2 members)	Jeremiah Colman	Liberal
Norwich (2 members)	Samuel Hoare	Conservative
Norwood	Ernest Tritton	Conservative
Nottingham East	Arnold Morley	Liberal
Nottingham South	Henry Smith Wright	Conservative
Nottingham West	Charles Seely	Liberal Unionist
Nuneaton	Francis Newdegate	Conservative
== O ==
Oldham (two members)	Joshua Milne Cheetham	Liberal
Oldham (two members)	J. T. Hibbert	Liberal
Orkney and Shetland	Leonard Lyell	Liberal
Ormskirk	Arthur Forwood	Conservative
Osgoldcross	John Austin	Liberal
Ossory	Eugene Crean	Irish National Federation
Oswestry	Stanley Leighton	Conservative
Otley	John Barran	Liberal
Oxford	Sir George Tomkyns Chesney	Conservative
Oxford University (two members)	Sir John Mowbray, Bt	Conservative
Oxford University (two members)	John Gilbert Talbot	Conservative
== P ==
Paddington North	John Aird	Conservative
Paddington South	Lord Randolph Churchill	Conservative
Paisley	William Dunn	Liberal
Partick	James Parker Smith	Liberal Unionist
Peckham	Frederick Banbury	Conservative
Peebles and Selkirk	Walter Thorburn	Liberal Unionist
Pembroke and Haverfordwest District	Charles Allen	Liberal
Pembrokeshire	William Rees-Davies	Liberal
Penrith	James Lowther	Conservative
Penryn and Falmouth	William Cavendish-Bentinck	Conservative
Perth	William Whitelaw	Conservative
Perthshire Eastern	Sir John Kinloch, Bt	Liberal
Perthshire Western	Sir Donald Currie	Liberal Unionist
Peterborough	Alpheus Morton	Liberal
Petersfield	William Wickham	Conservative
Plymouth (2 members)	Sir Edward Clarke	Conservative
Plymouth (2 members)	Sir William Pearce, Bt	Conservative
Pontefract	Rowland Winn	Conservative
Poplar	Sydney Buxton	Liberal
Portsmouth (2 members)	Sir John Baker	Liberal
Portsmouth (2 members)	Walter Clough	Liberal
Preston (2 members)	William Tomlinson	Conservative
Preston (2 members)	Robert William Hanbury	Conservative
Prestwich	Robert Mowbray	Conservative
Pudsey	Briggs Priestley	Liberal
== R ==
Radcliffe cum Farnworth	Robert Leake	Liberal
Radnorshire	Francis Edwards	Liberal
Ramsey	Hon. Ailwyn Fellowes	Conservative
Reading	George Palmer	Liberal
Reigate	Hon. Henry Cubitt	Conservative
Renfrewshire East	Hugh Shaw-Stewart	Conservative
Renfrewshire West	Charles Renshaw	Conservative
Rhondda	William Abraham	Liberal-Labour
Richmond	George Elliot	Conservative
Ripon	John Lloyd Wharton	Conservative
Rochdale	Thomas Bayley Potter	Liberal
Rochester	Horatio Davies	Conservative
Romford	James Theobald	Conservative
Roscommon North	Matthias McDonnell Bodkin	Irish National Federation
Roscommon South	Luke Hayden	Irish National League
Ross	Michael Biddulph	Liberal Unionist
Ross and Cromarty	James Galloway Weir	Liberal (Crofters')
Rossendale	John Maden	Liberal
Rotherham	Arthur Dyke Acland	Liberal
Rotherhithe	John Macdona	Conservative
Roxburghshire	Mark Napier	Liberal
Rugby	Henry Peyton Cobb	Liberal
Rushcliffe	John Ellis	Liberal
Rutland	George Finch	Conservative
Rye	Arthur Montagu Brookfield	Conservative
== S ==
Saffron Walden	Herbert Gardner	Liberal
St Albans	Vicary Gibbs	Conservative
St Andrews District of Burghs	Henry Torrens Anstruther	Liberal Unionist
St Augustine's	Aretas Akers-Douglas	Conservative
St Austell	William Alexander McArthur	Liberal
St George, Hanover Square	George Goschen	Liberal Unionist
St George, Tower Hamlets	John Benn	Liberal
St Helens	Sir Henry Seton-Karr	Conservative
St Ives	Thomas Bedford Bolitho	Liberal Unionist
St Pancras East	Robert Webster	Conservative
St Pancras North	Thomas Henry Bolton	Liberal
St Pancras South	Sir Julian Goldsmid, Bt	Liberal Unionist
St Pancras West	Harry Graham	Conservative
Salford North	William Holland	Liberal
Salford South	Sir Henry Hoyle Howorth	Conservative
Salford West	Lees Knowles	Conservative
Salisbury	Edward Hulse	Conservative
Scarborough	Sir George Sitwell, Bt	Conservative
Sevenoaks	Henry Forster	Conservative
Sheffield Attercliffe	Hon. Bernard Coleridge	Liberal
Sheffield Brightside	A. J. Mundella	Liberal
Sheffield, Central	Sir Howard Vincent	Conservative
Sheffield, Ecclesall	Sir Ellis Ashmead-Bartlett	Conservative
Sheffield Hallam	Charles Stuart-Wortley	Conservative
Shipley	William Pollard Byles	Liberal-Labour
Shrewsbury	Henry David Greene	Conservative
Skipton	Charles Savile Roundell	Liberal
Sleaford	Henry Chaplin	Conservative
Sligo North	Bernard Collery	Irish National Federation
Sligo South	Thomas Curran	Irish National Federation
Somerset Eastern	Henry Hobhouse	Liberal Unionist
Somerset Northern	Courtenay Warner	Liberal
Somerset Southern	Edward Strachey	Liberal
South Molton	George Lambert	Liberal
South Shields	James Cochran Stevenson	Liberal
Southampton (2 members)	Francis Evans	Liberal
Southampton (2 members)	Tankerville Chamberlayne	Conservative
Southport	Hon. George Curzon	Conservative
Southwark West	Richard Causton	Liberal
Sowerby	John William Mellor	Liberal
Spalding	Halley Stewart	Liberal
Spen Valley	Thomas Whittaker	Liberal
Stafford	Charles Shaw	Liberal
Staffordshire North Western	James Heath	Conservative
Staffordshire Western	Hamar Alfred Bass	Liberal Unionist
Stalybridge	Tom Harrop Sidebottom	Conservative
Stamford	Henry Cust	Conservative
Stepney	Frederick Wootton Isaacson	Conservative
Stirling District of Burghs	Henry Campbell-Bannerman	Liberal
Stirlingshire	William Jacks	Liberal
Stockport (2 members)	Louis John Jennings	Conservative
Stockport (2 members)	Sir Joseph Leigh	Liberal
Stockton-on-Tees	Thomas Wrightson	Conservative
Stoke-on-Trent	George Leveson-Gower	Liberal
Stowmarket	Sydney Stern	Liberal
Strand	Frederick Smith	Conservative
Stratford upon Avon	Bertram Freeman-Mitford	Conservative
Stretford	John Maclure	Conservative
Stroud	David Brynmor Jones	Liberal
Sudbury	Cuthbert Quilter	Liberal Unionist
Sunderland (2 members)	Sir Edward Gourley	Liberal
Sunderland (2 members)	Samuel Storey	Liberal
Sutherlandshire	Angus Sutherland	Liberal (Crofters')
Swansea District	Sir Henry Vivian, Bt	Liberal
Swansea Town	Robert Burnie	Liberal
== T ==
Tamworth	Philip Muntz	Conservative
Taunton	Alfred Percy Allsopp	Conservative
Tavistock	Hugh Luttrell	Liberal
Tewkesbury	Sir John Dorington, Bt	Conservative
Thirsk and Malton	John Lawson	Conservative
Thornbury	Charles Colston	Conservative
Tipperary East	Thomas Condon	Irish National Federation
Tipperary Mid	John McCarthy	Irish National Federation
Tipperary North	Patrick Joseph O'Brien	Irish National Federation
Tipperary South	Francis Mandeville	Irish National Federation
Tiverton	Sir William Walrond, Bt	Conservative
Torquay	Richard Mallock	Conservative
Totnes	Francis Bingham Mildmay	Liberal Unionist
Tottenham	Joseph Howard	Conservative
Truro	John Charles Williams	Liberal Unionist
Tullamore	Joseph Francis Fox	Irish National Federation
Tunbridge	Arthur Griffith-Boscawen	Conservative
Tynemouth	Richard Donkin	Conservative
Tyneside	Jack Pease	Liberal
Tyrone East	William James Reynolds	Irish National Federation
Tyrone Mid	Matthew Joseph Kenny	Irish National Federation
Tyrone North	Lord Frederick Spencer Hamilton	Irish Unionist
Tyrone South	Thomas Russell	Liberal Unionist
== U ==
Uxbridge	Frederick Dixon-Hartland	Conservative
== W ==
Wakefield	Albany Charlesworth	Conservative
Walsall	Frank James	Conservative
Walthamstow	Edmund Widdrington Byrne	Conservative
Walworth	William Saunders	Liberal
Wandsworth	Henry Kimber	Conservative
Wansbeck	Charles Fenwick	Liberal-Labour
Warrington	Robert Pierpont	Conservative
Warwick and Leamington	Arthur Peel	Liberal Unionist
Waterford City	John Redmond	Irish National League
Waterford East	Patrick Power	Irish National Federation
Waterford West	Alfred Webb	Irish National Federation
Watford	Frederick Halsey	Conservative
Wednesbury	Wilson Lloyd	Conservative
Wellington (Salop)	Alexander Brown	Liberal Unionist
Wellington (Somerset)	Sir Alexander Fuller-Acland-Hood, Bt	Conservative
Wells	Sir Richard Paget, Bt	Conservative
West Bromwich	Ernest Spencer	Conservative
West Ham North	Archibald Grove	Liberal
West Ham South	Keir Hardie	Independent Labour
Westbury	George Fuller	Liberal
Westhoughton	Edward Stanley	Conservative
Westmeath North	James Tuite	Irish National Federation
Westmeath South	Donal Sullivan	Irish National Federation
Westminster	William Burdett-Coutts	Conservative
Wexford North	Thomas Joseph Healy	Irish National Federation
Wexford South	John Barry	Irish National Federation
Whitby	Ernest Beckett	Conservative
Whitechapel	Samuel Montagu	Liberal
Whitehaven	Thomas Little	Liberal
Wick District of Burghs	Sir John Pender	Liberal Unionist
Wicklow East	John Sweetman	Irish National Federation
Wicklow West	James O'Connor	Irish National Federation
Widnes	John Saunders Gilliat	Conservative
Wigan	Sir Francis Powell, Bt	Conservative
Wigtownshire	Sir Herbert Maxwell, Bt	Conservative
Wilton	Viscount Folkestone	Conservative
Wimbledon	Cosmo Bonsor	Conservative
Winchester	William Myers	Conservative
Windsor	Francis Barry	Conservative
Wirral	Edward Cotton-Jodrell	Conservative
Wisbech	Hon. Arthur Brand	Liberal
Wokingham	Sir George Russell, Bt	Conservative
Wolverhampton East	Henry Fowler	Liberal
Wolverhampton South	Charles Pelham Villiers	Liberal Unionist
Wolverhampton West	Alfred Hickman	Conservative
Woodbridge	Robert Lacey Everett	Liberal
Woodstock	Godfrey Benson	Liberal
Woolwich	Edwin Hughes	Conservative
Worcester	George Allsopp	Conservative
Worcestershire East	Austen Chamberlain	Liberal Unionist
Worcestershire North	Benjamin Hingley	Liberal
Wycombe	Viscount Curzon	Conservative
== Y ==
York (two members)	John Butcher	Conservative
York (two members)	Frank Lockwood	Liberal

== By-elections ==
8 February 1893: County Cork North East - Michael Davitt (Irish National Federation) replacing William O'Brien (Irish National Federation) who had been elected for two seats and chose to sit for Cork City

17 February 1893: Meath South - Jeremiah Jordan (Irish National Federation) replacing Patrick Fullam (Irish National Federation) who was unseated on petition

21 February 1893: Meath North - James Gibney (Irish National Federation) replacing Michael Davitt (Irish National Federation) who was unseated on petition

27 June 1895: Cork City - J. F. X. O'Brien (Irish National Federation) replacing William O'Brien (Irish National Federation) who had resigned his seat

== Sources ==
Whitaker's Almanack 1893

== See also ==
- List of parliaments of the United Kingdom
- 1892 United Kingdom general election
