= List of MPs elected in the 1886 United Kingdom general election =

1886–1892 Parliament of the United Kingdom
←	1885–1886 Parliament	1892–1895 Parliament	→
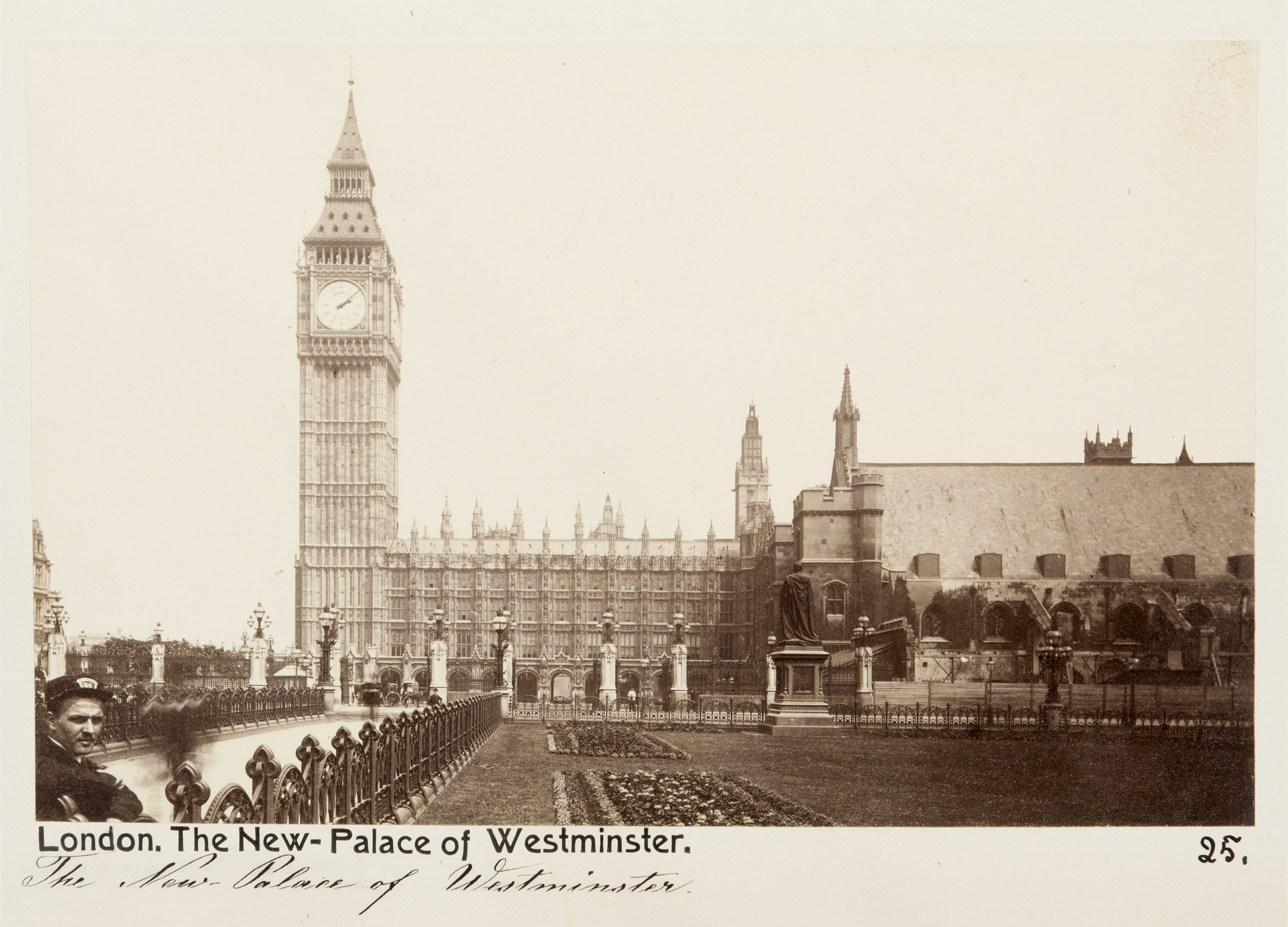
- The Palace of Westminster in 1886

Overview
- Legislative body: Parliament of the United Kingdom
- Jurisdiction: United Kingdom
- Meeting place: Palace of Westminster
- Term: 27 July 1886 – 4 July 1892
- Election: 1886 United Kingdom general election
- Government: Second Salisbury ministry

House of Commons
- Members: 670
- Speaker: Arthur Peel
- Leader: Archibald Primrose, 5th Earl of Rosebery; W. H. Smith (1887–1891); Lord Randolph Churchill (until 1887)
- Prime Minister: Marquess of Salisbury
- Leader of the Opposition: William Ewart Gladstone
- Third-party leader: Charles Stewart Parnell
- Party control: Conservative Party

House of Lords
- Lord Chancellor: Hardinge Giffard, 1st Earl of Halsbury
- Leader: Marquess of Salisbury
- Leader of the Opposition: John Wodehouse, 1st Earl of Kimberley; Granville Leveson-Gower, 2nd Earl Granville (until 1891)

Crown-in-Parliament Victoria

Sessions
- 1st: 5 August 1886 – 25 September 1886
- 2nd: 27 January 1887 – 16 September 1887
- 3rd: 9 February 1888 – 24 December 1888
- 4th: 21 February 1889 – 30 August 1889
- 5th: 11 February 1890 – 18 August 1890
- 6th: 25 November 1890 – 5 August 1891
- 7th: 9 February 1892 – 28 June 1892

This is a list of members of Parliament (MPs) elected in the 1886 general election, held over several days from 1 July to 27 July 1886.

Party	Seats
Conservative Party	303
Liberal Party	192
Irish Parliamentary Party	85
Liberal Unionist Party	77
Irish Unionist	13

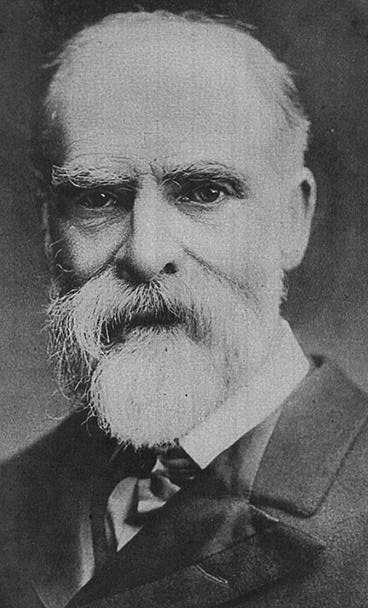
James Bryce; Member of Parliament for Aberdeen South 1885-1907

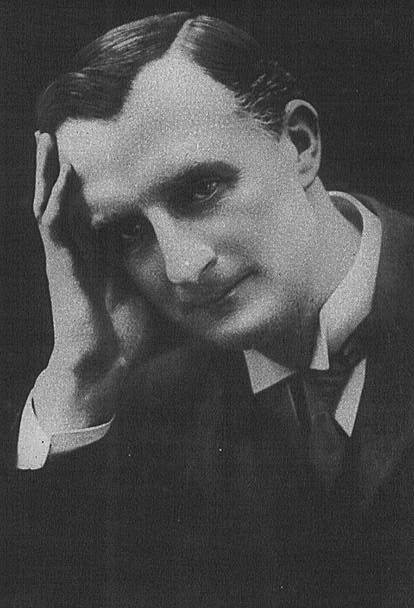
Sir Edward Grey; Member of Parliament for Berwick-upon-Tweed 1885-1916

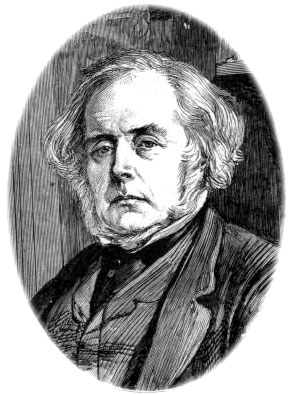
John Bright; Member of Parliament for Birmingham Central 1885-1889

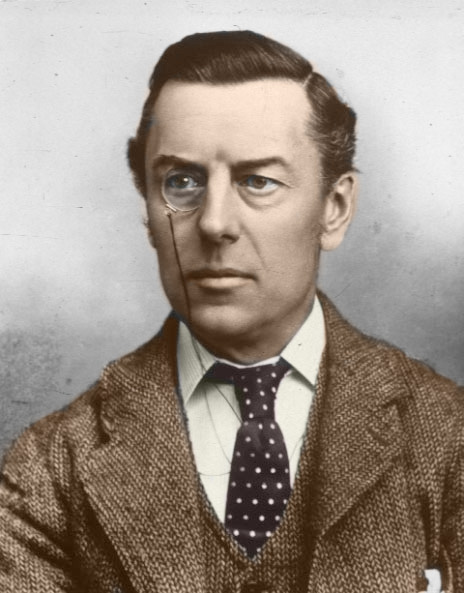
Joseph Chamberlain; Member of Parliament for Birmingham West 1885-1914

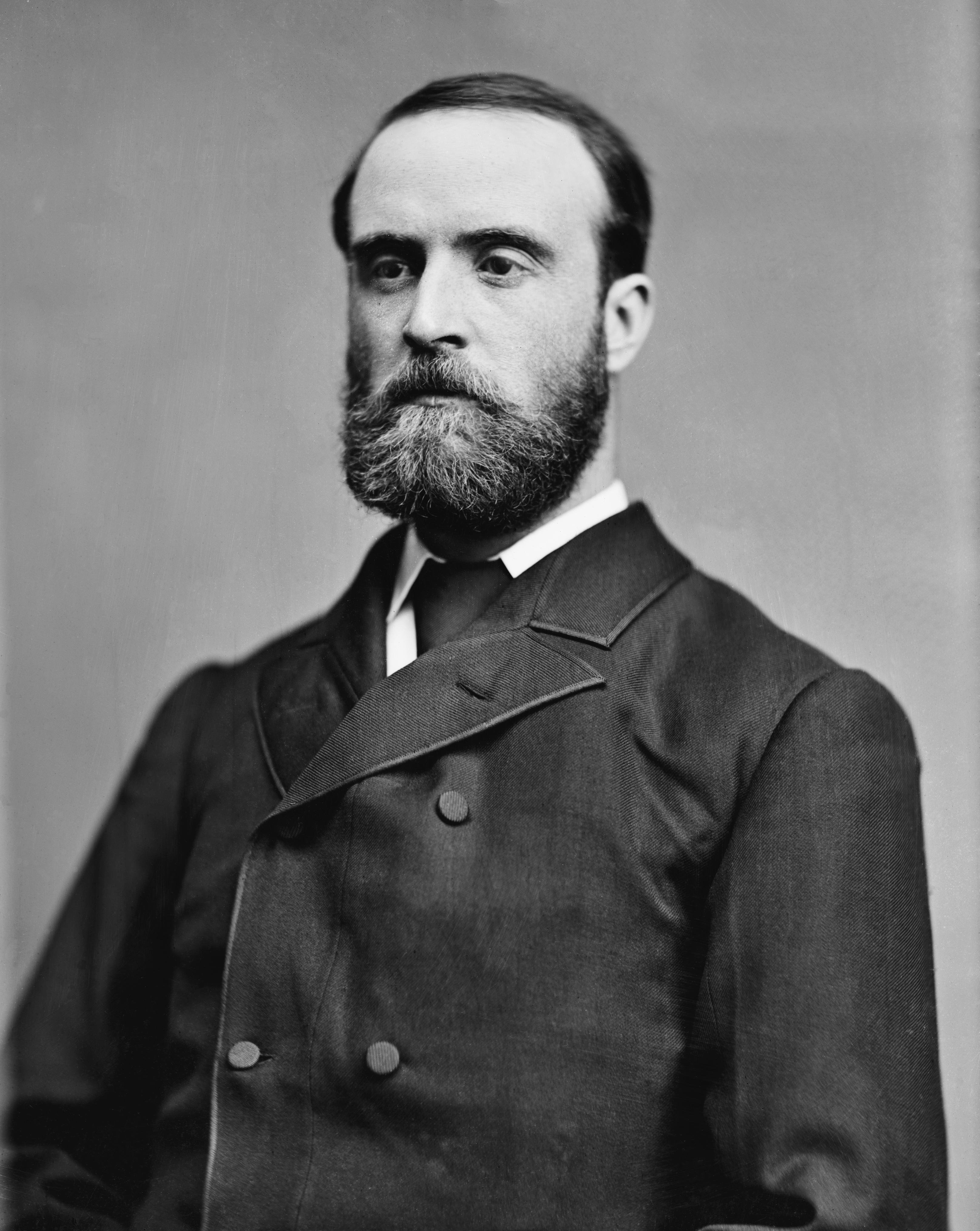
Charles Stewart Parnell; Member of Parliament for Cork 1890-1891

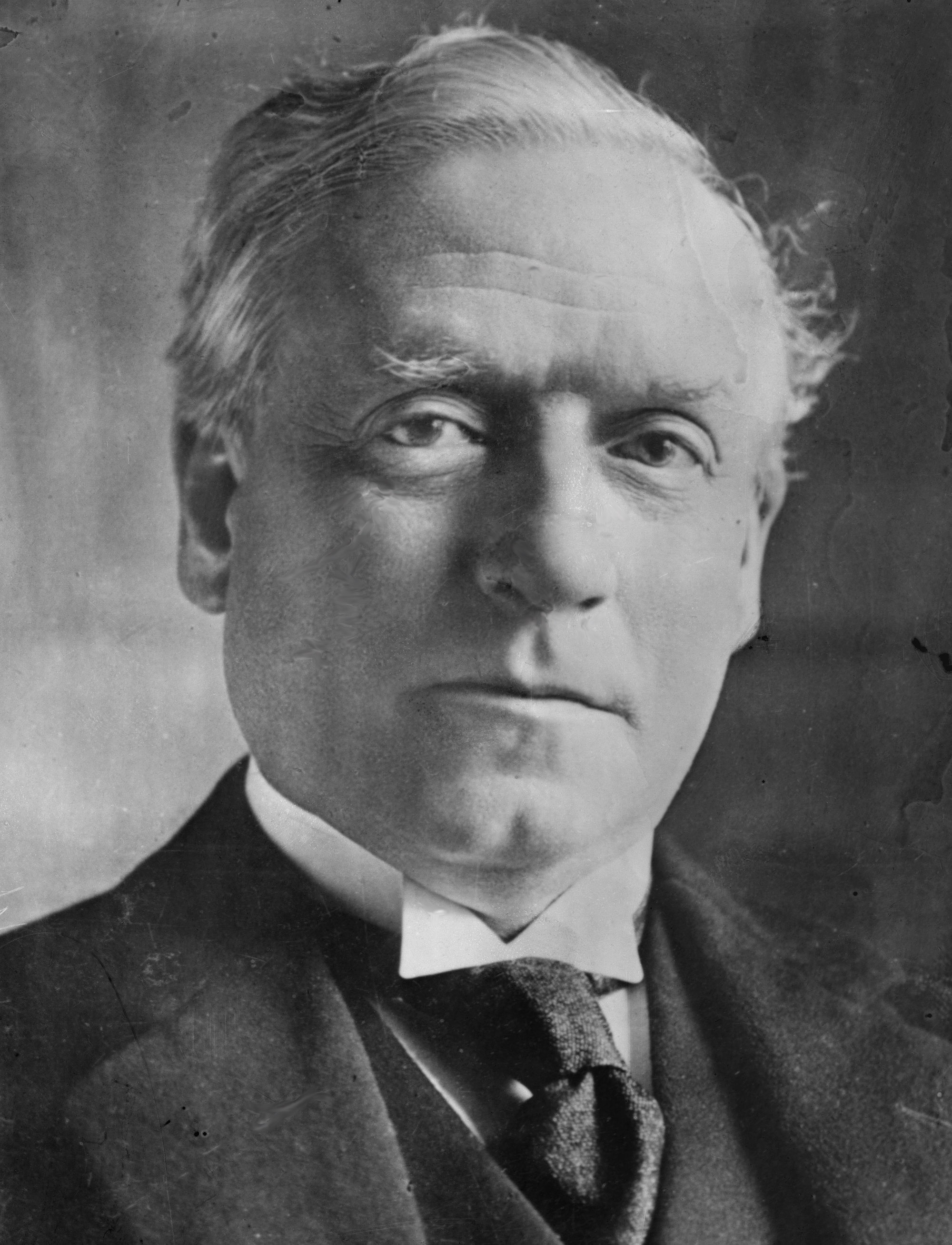
H. H. Asquith; Member of Parliament for East Fife 1886-1918

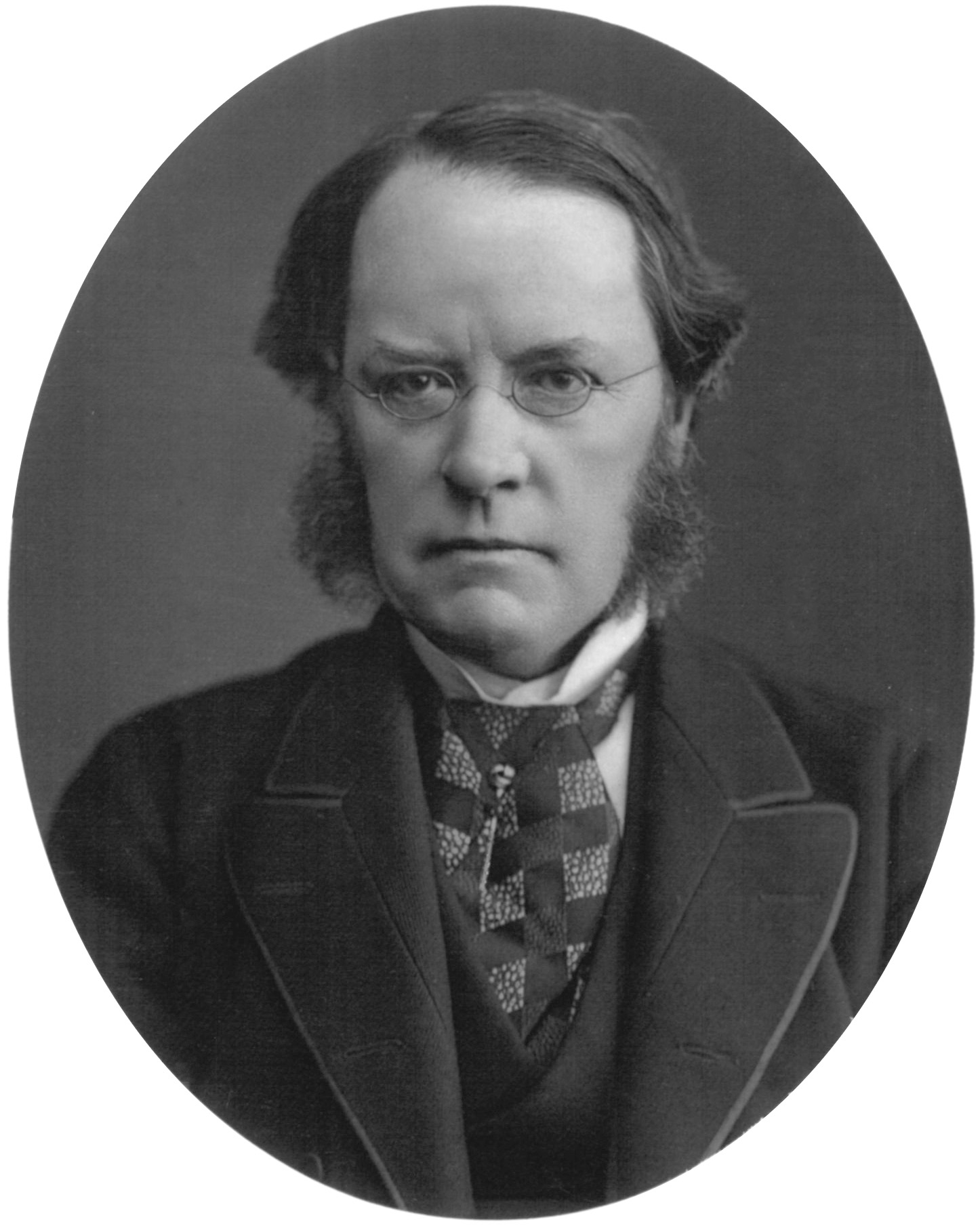
Lyon Playfair; Member of Parliament for Leeds South 1885-1892

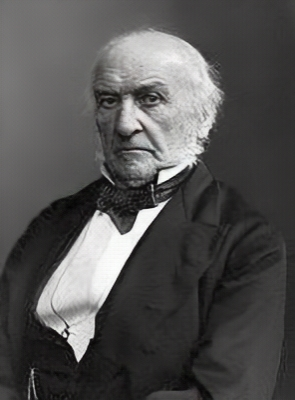
William Gladstone; Member of Parliament for Midlothian 1880-1895

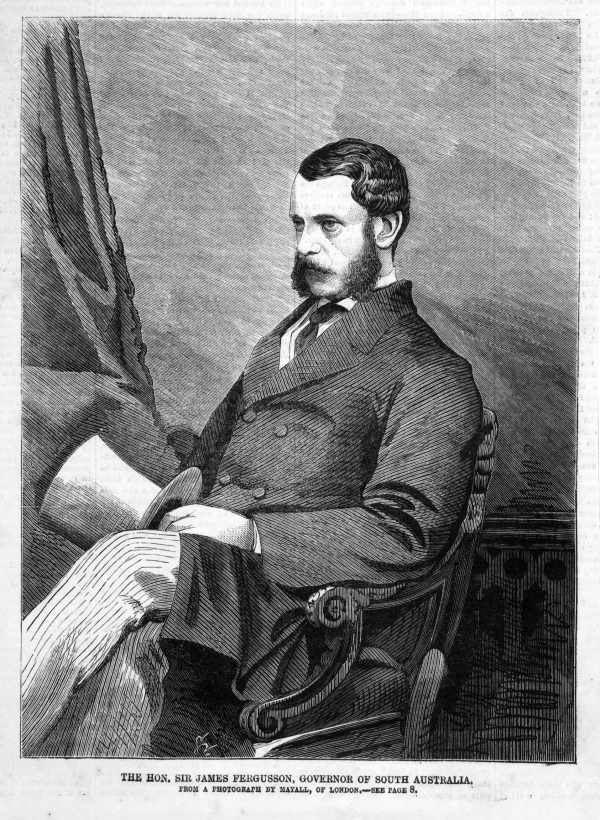
Sir James Fergusson; Member of Parliament for Manchester North-East 1885-1906

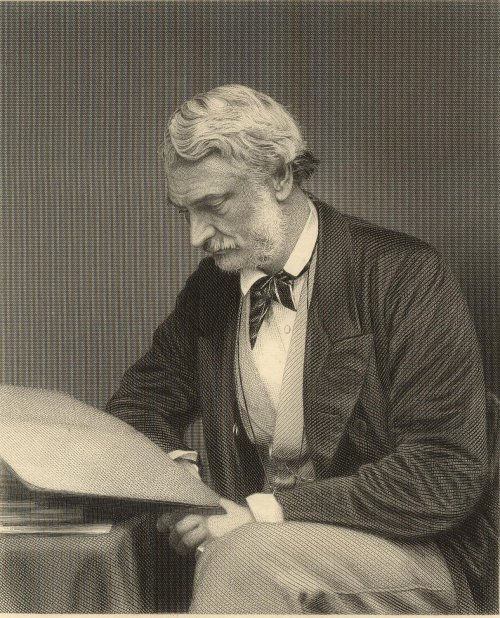
Lord John Manners; Member of Parliament for Melton 1885-1888

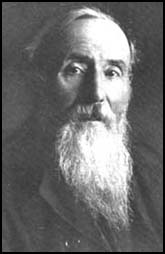
Thomas Burt; Member of Parliament for Morpeth 1874-1918

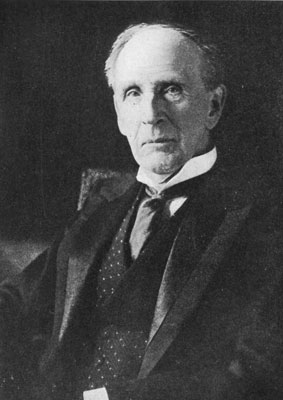
John Morley; Member of Parliament for Newcastle-upon-Tyne 1883-1895

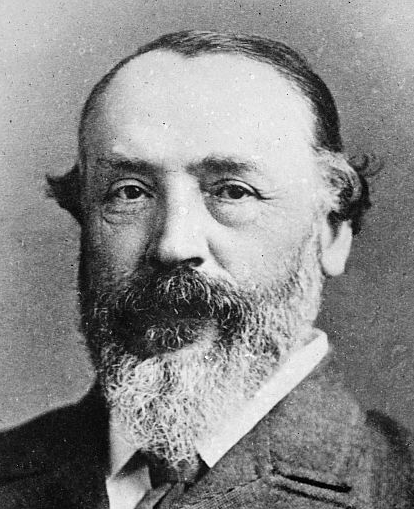
Henry Labouchère; Member of Parliament for Northampton from 1880 to 1896

Lord Randolph Churchill; Member of Parliament for Paddington South 1885-1894

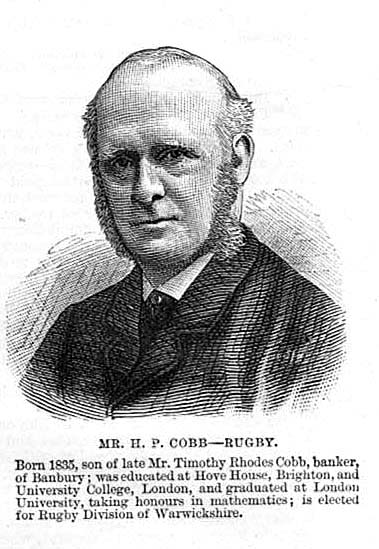
Henry Peyton Cobb; Member of Parliament for Rugby 1885-1895

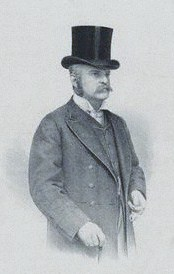
Hamar Alfred Bass; Member of Parliament for Staffordshire West 1885 - 1898

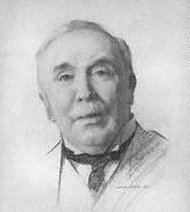
Henry Campbell-Bannerman; Member of Parliament for Stirling 1868-1908

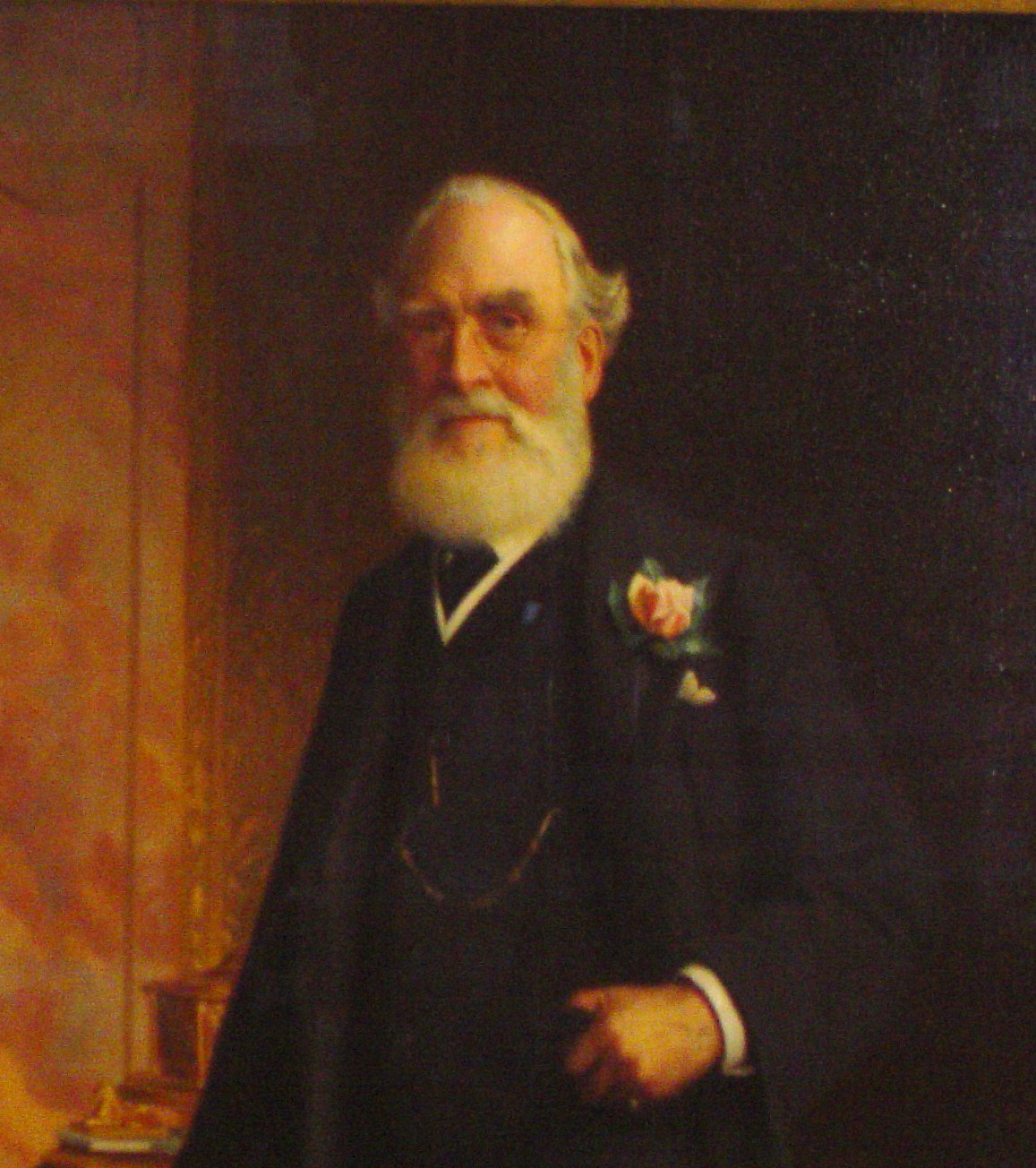
Henry Kimber; Member of Parliament for Wandsworth 1885-1913

Table of contents:

A B C D E F G H I J K L M N O P Q R S T U V W X Y Z By-elections Changes

== A ==
Constituency	MP	Party
Aberdeen North	William Hunter	Liberal
Aberdeen South	James Bryce	Liberal
Aberdeenshire East	Peter Esslemont	Liberal
Aberdeenshire West	Robert Farquharson	Liberal
Abingdon	Philip Wroughton	Conservative
Accrington	Robert Hodge	Conservative
Altrincham	Sir William Cunliffe Brooks, Bt	Conservative
Andover	William Wither Bramston Beach	Conservative
Anglesey	Thomas Lewis	Liberal
Antrim East	James McCalmont	Irish Unionist
Antrim North	Edward Macnaghten	Irish Unionist
Antrim Mid	Hon. Robert Torrens O'Neill	Irish Unionist
Antrim South	William Ellison-Macartney	Irish Unionist
Appleby	William Lowther	Conservative
Arfon	William Rathbone	Liberal
Argyllshire	John Malcolm	Conservative
Armagh Mid	Sir James Corry, Bt	Irish Unionist
Armagh North	Edward James Saunderson	Irish Unionist
Armagh South	Alexander Blane	Irish Parliamentary Party
Ashburton	Charles Seale-Hayne	Liberal
Ashford	William Pomfret	Conservative
Ashton-under-Lyne	John Addison	Conservative
Aston Manor	George Kynoch	Conservative
Aylesbury	Ferdinand de Rothschild	Liberal Unionist
Ayr District of Burghs	Richard Campbell	Liberal Unionist
Ayrshire North	Hon. Hugh Elliot	Liberal Unionist
Ayrshire South	Greville Vernon	Liberal Unionist
== B ==
Banbury	Sir Bernhard Samuelson, Bt	Liberal
Banffshire	Robert Duff	Liberal
Barkston Ash	Robert Gunter	Conservative
Barnard Castle	Sir Joseph Pease, Bt	Liberal
Barnsley	Courtney Kenny	Liberal
Barnstaple	George Pitt-Lewis	Liberal Unionist
Barrow-in-Furness	William Sproston Caine	Liberal Unionist
Basingstoke	George Sclater-Booth	Conservative
Bassetlaw	William Beckett-Denison	Conservative
Bath (two members)	Edmond Wodehouse	Liberal Unionist
Bath (two members)	Robert Peter Laurie	Conservative
Battersea	Octavius Vaughan Morgan	Liberal
Bedford	Samuel Whitbread	Liberal
Belfast East	Edward de Cobain (expelled 26 February 1892)	Irish Unionist
Belfast North	Sir William Ewart, Bt	Conservative
Belfast South	William Johnston	Conservative
Belfast West	Thomas Sexton	Irish Parliamentary Party
Bermondsey	Alfred Lafone	Conservative
Berwick-upon-Tweed	Sir Edward Grey, Bt	Liberal
Berwickshire	Hon. Edward Marjoribanks	Liberal
Bethnal Green North East	George Howell	Liberal-Labour
Bethnal Green South West	Edward Pickersgill	Liberal
Bewdley	Sir Edmund Lechmere, Bt	Conservative
Biggleswade	Viscount Baring	Liberal Unionist
Birkenhead	Sir Edward Bruce Hamley	Conservative
Birmingham Bordesley	Jesse Collings	Liberal Unionist
Birmingham Central	John Bright	Liberal Unionist
Birmingham East	Henry Matthews	Conservative
Birmingham Edgbaston	George Dixon	Liberal Unionist
Birmingham North	William Kenrick	Liberal Unionist
Birmingham South	Joseph Powell-Williams	Liberal Unionist
Birmingham West	Joseph Chamberlain	Liberal Unionist
Birr	Bernard Molloy	Irish Parliamentary Party
Bishop Auckland	James Mellor Paulton	Liberal
Blackburn (two members)	William Coddington	Conservative
Blackburn (two members)	Harry Hornby	Conservative
Blackpool	Sir Frederick Stanley	Conservative
Bodmin	Leonard Courtney	Liberal Unionist
Bolton (two members)	Herbert Shepherd-Cross	Conservative
Bolton (two members)	Hon. Francis Charles Bridgeman	Conservative
Bootle	Thomas Sandys	Conservative
Boston	Henry Farmer-Atkinson	Conservative
Bosworth	James Ellis	Liberal
Bow and Bromley	Sir John Colomb	Conservative
Bradford Central	George Shaw-Lefevre	Liberal
Bradford East	Henry Byron Reed	Conservative
Bradford West	Alfred Illingworth	Liberal
Brecknockshire	William Fuller-Maitland	Liberal
Brentford	Octavius Coope	Conservative
Bridgwater	Edward Stanley	Conservative
Brigg	Samuel Danks Waddy	Liberal
Brighton (two members)	Sir William Thackeray Marriott	Conservative
Brighton (two members)	David Smith	Conservative
Bristol East	Handel Cossham	Liberal
Bristol North	Lewis Fry	Liberal Unionist
Bristol South	Edward Stock Hill	Conservative
Bristol West	Sir Michael Hicks Beach, Bt	Conservative
Brixton	Ernest Baggallay	Conservative
Buckingham	Egerton Hubbard	Conservative
Buckrose	William Alexander McArthur	Liberal
Burnley	Peter Rylands	Liberal Unionist
Burton	Sir Michael Bass, Bt	Liberal
Bury	Sir Henry James	Liberal Unionist
Bury St Edmunds	Lord Francis Hervey	Conservative
Buteshire	James Robertson	Conservative
== C ==
Caithness-shire	Gavin Brown Clark	Liberal (Crofters')
Camberwell North	John Richards Kelly	Conservative
Camborne	Charles Conybeare	Liberal
Cambridge	Robert Uniacke-Penrose-Fitzgerald	Conservative
Cambridge University (two members)	Alexander Beresford Hope	Conservative
Cambridge University (two members)	Henry Cecil Raikes	Conservative
Canterbury	John Henniker Heaton	Conservative
Cardiff District	Sir Edward James Reed	Liberal
Cardiganshire	William Bowen Rowlands	Liberal
Carlisle	William Gully	Liberal
County Carlow	John Aloysius Blake	Irish Parliamentary Party
Carmarthen District	Sir Arthur Cowell-Stepney, Bt	Liberal
Carmarthenshire East	David Pugh	Liberal
Carmarthenshire West	W. R. H. Powell	Liberal
Carnarvon	Edmund Swetenham	Conservative
Cavan East	Thomas O'Hanlon	Irish Parliamentary Party
Cavan West	Joseph Biggar	Irish Parliamentary Party
Chatham	Sir John Eldon Gorst	Conservative
Chelmsford	William Beadel	Conservative
Chelsea	Charles Algernon Whitmore	Conservative
Cheltenham	James Agg-Gardner	Conservative
Chertsey	Frederick Hankey	Conservative
Chester	Robert Yerburgh	Conservative
Chester-le-Street	James Joicey	Liberal
Chesterfield	Alfred Barnes	Liberal Unionist
Chesterton	Charles Hall	Conservative
Chichester	The Earl of March	Conservative
Chippenham	Lord Henry Brudenell-Bruce	Conservative
Chorley	Joseph Feilden	Conservative
Christchurch	Charles Young	Conservative
Cirencester	Arthur Winterbotham	Liberal Unionist
Clackmannan and Kinrossshire	John Balfour	Liberal
Clapham	John Saunders Gilliat	Conservative
Clare East	Joseph Richard Cox	Irish Parliamentary Party
Clare West	Jeremiah Jordan	Irish Parliamentary Party
Cleveland	Henry Fell Pease	Liberal
Clitheroe	Sir Ughtred Kay-Shuttleworth, Bt	Liberal
Cockermouth	Sir Wilfrid Lawson, Bt	Liberal
Colchester	Henry John Trotter	Conservative
Colne Valley	Henry Beaumont	Liberal Unionist
Cork City (two members)	Charles Stewart Parnell	Irish Parliamentary Party
Cork City (two members)	Maurice Healy	Irish Parliamentary Party
County Cork East	William John Lane	Irish Parliamentary Party
County Cork Mid	Charles Kearns Deane Tanner	Irish Parliamentary Party
County Cork North	James Christopher Flynn	Irish Parliamentary Party
County Cork North East	Edmund Leamy	Irish Parliamentary Party
County Cork South	J. E. Kenny	Irish Parliamentary Party
County Cork South East	John Hooper	Irish Parliamentary Party
County Cork West	James Gilhooly	Irish Parliamentary Party
Coventry	Henry Eaton	Conservative
Crewe	Walter McLaren	Liberal
Cricklade	Nevil Story Maskelyne	Liberal Unionist
Croydon	Sidney Herbert	Conservative
== D ==
Darlington	Theodore Fry	Liberal
Dartford	Sir William Hart Dyke, Bt	Conservative
Darwen	Viscount Cranborne	Conservative
Denbigh Boroughs	George Thomas Kenyon	Conservative
Denbighshire East	George Osborne Morgan	Liberal
Denbighshire West	William Cornwallis-West	Liberal Unionist
Deptford	William John Evelyn	Conservative
Derby (two members)	Thomas Roe	Liberal
Derby (two members)	Sir William Vernon Harcourt	Liberal
Derbyshire Mid	Sir James Alfred Jacoby	Liberal
Derbyshire North East	Thomas Bolton	Liberal
Derbyshire South	Henry Wardle	Liberal
Derbyshire West	Lord Edward Cavendish	Liberal Unionist
Devizes	Walter Long	Conservative
Devonport (2 members)	Sir John Henry Puleston	Conservative
Devonport (2 members)	George Edward Price	Conservative
Dewsbury	John Simon	Liberal
Doncaster	Walter Shirley Shirley	Liberal
Donegal East	Arthur O'Connor	Irish Parliamentary Party
Donegal North	James Edward O'Doherty	Irish Parliamentary Party
Donegal South	Bernard Kelly	Irish Parliamentary Party
Donegal West	Patrick O'Hea	Irish Parliamentary Party
Dorset East	George Bond	Conservative
Dorset North	Edwin Berkeley Portman	Liberal
Dorset South	Charles J. T. Hambro	Conservative
Dorset West	Henry Richard Farquharson	Conservative
Dover	Alexander George Dickson	Conservative
Down East	Richard Ker	Irish Unionist
Down North	Thomas Waring	Irish Unionist
Down South	Michael McCartan	Irish Parliamentary Party
Down West	Lord Arthur Hill	Irish Unionist
Droitwich	John Corbett	Liberal Unionist
Dublin County North	J. J. Clancy	Irish Parliamentary Party
Dublin County South	Sir Thomas Esmonde, Bt	Irish Parliamentary Party
Dublin College Green	Timothy Daniel Sullivan	Irish Parliamentary Party
Dublin Harbour	Timothy Harrington	Irish Parliamentary Party
Dublin St Patrick's	William Martin Murphy	Irish Parliamentary Party
Dublin St Stephen's Green	Edmund Dwyer Gray	Irish Parliamentary Party
Dublin University (two members)	Hugh Holmes	Conservative/Unionist
Dublin University (two members)	Hon. David Plunket	Conservative
Dudley	Brooke Robinson	Conservative
Dulwich	John Morgan Howard	Conservative
Dumbartonshire	Sir Archibald Orr-Ewing, Bt	Conservative
Dumfries District of Burghs	Robert Reid	Liberal
Dumfriesshire	Sir Robert Jardine	Liberal Unionist
Dundee (two members)	Charles Lacaita	Liberal
Dundee (two members)	Edmund Robertson	Liberal
Durham	Thomas Milvain	Conservative
Durham Mid	William Crawford	Liberal-Labour
Durham North West	Llewellyn Atherley-Jones	Liberal
Durham South East	Sir Henry Havelock-Allan, Bt	Liberal Unionist
== E ==
Ealing	Lord George Hamilton	Conservative
East Grinstead	Alfred Gathorne-Hardy	Conservative
Eastbourne	Edward Field	Conservative
Eccles	Alfred Egerton	Conservative
Eddisbury	Henry James Tollemache	Conservative
Edinburgh Central	William McEwan	Liberal
Edinburgh East	Robert Wallace	Liberal
Edinburgh South	Hugh Childers	Liberal
Edinburgh West	Thomas Buchanan	Liberal Unionist
Edinburgh and St Andrews Universities	John Macdonald	Conservative
Egremont	The Lord Muncaster	Conservative
Eifion	John Bryn Roberts	Liberal
Elgin District of Burghs	Alexander Asher	Liberal
Elgin and Nairnshires	Charles Anderson	Liberal
Elland	Thomas Wayman	Liberal
Enfield	Viscount Folkestone	Conservative
Epping	Sir Henry Selwin-Ibbetson, Bt	Conservative
Epsom	George Cubitt	Conservative
Eskdale	Robert Andrew Allison	Liberal
Essex South East	Carne Rasch	Conservative
Evesham	Sir Richard Temple, Bt	Conservative
Exeter	Henry Northcote	Conservative
Eye	Francis Seymour Stevenson	Liberal
== F ==
Falkirk District of Burghs	William Pirrie Sinclair	Liberal Unionist
Fareham	Sir Frederick Fitzwygram, Bt	Conservative
Faversham	Herbert Knatchbull-Hugessen	Conservative
Fermanagh North	Willie Redmond	Irish Parliamentary Party
Fermanagh South	Henry Campbell	Irish Parliamentary Party
Fife East	H. H. Asquith	Liberal
Fife West	Hon. Robert Preston Bruce	Liberal
Finsbury Central	Frederick Thomas Penton	Conservative
Finsbury East	James Rowlands	Liberal-Labour
Flint District	John Roberts	Liberal
Flintshire	Samuel Smith	Liberal
Forest of Dean	Thomas Blake	Liberal
Forfarshire	James William Barclay	Liberal Unionist
Frome	Viscount Weymouth	Conservative
Fulham	William Hayes Fisher	Conservative
== G ==
Gainsborough	Henry Eyre	Conservative
Galway Borough	John Pinkerton	Irish Parliamentary Party
Galway Connemara	Patrick James Foley	Irish Parliamentary Party
County Galway East	Matt Harris	Irish Parliamentary Party
County Galway North	John Philip Nolan	Irish Parliamentary Party
County Galway South	David Sheehy	Irish Parliamentary Party
Gateshead	Walter James	Liberal
Glamorganshire, East	Sir Alfred Thomas	Liberal
Glamorganshire, Mid	Christopher Rice Mansel Talbot	Liberal
Glamorganshire, South	Arthur John Williams	Liberal
Glasgow and Aberdeen Universities	James Alexander Campbell	Conservative
Glasgow Blackfriars and Hutchesontown	Andrew Provand	Liberal
Glasgow Bridgeton	Edward Russell	Liberal
Glasgow Camlachie	Hugh Watt	Liberal
Glasgow Central	John George Alexander Baird	Conservative
Glasgow College	Charles Cameron	Liberal
Glasgow St Rollox	James Caldwell	Liberal Unionist
Glasgow Tradeston	Archibald Corbett	Liberal Unionist
Gloucester	Thomas Robinson	Liberal
Gorton	Richard Peacock	Liberal
Govan	William Pearce	Conservative
Gower District	Frank Ash Yeo	Liberal
Grantham	Malcolm Low	Conservative
Gravesend	John Bazley White	Conservative
Great Grimsby	Edward Heneage	Liberal Unionist
Great Yarmouth	Sir Henry Tyler	Conservative
Greenock	Thomas Sutherland	Liberal Unionist
Greenwich	Thomas Boord	Conservative
Guildford	St John Brodrick	Conservative
== H ==
Hackney Central	Sir William Guyer Hunter	Conservative
Hackney North	Sir Lewis Pelly	Conservative
Hackney South	Charles Russell	Liberal
Haddingtonshire	Richard Haldane	Liberal
Haggerston	Randal Cremer	Liberal-Labour
Halifax (2 members)	Sir James Stansfeld	Liberal
Halifax (2 members)	Thomas Shaw	Liberal
Hallamshire	Frederick Mappin	Liberal
Hammersmith	Walter Tuckfield Goldsworthy	Conservative
Hampstead	Sir Henry Holland, Bt	Conservative
Handsworth	Henry Wiggin	Liberal Unionist
Hanley	William Woodall	Liberal
Harborough	Thomas Tapling	Conservative
Harrow	William Ambrose	Conservative
Hartlepools, The	Thomas Richardson	Liberal Unionist
Harwich	James Round	Conservative
Hastings	Wilson Noble	Conservative
Hawick District of Burghs	Alexander Laing Brown	Liberal
Henley	Francis Parker	Conservative
Hereford	Sir Joseph Bailey, Bt	Conservative
Hertford	Abel Smith	Conservative
Hexham	Miles MacInnes	Liberal
Heywood	Isaac Hoyle	Liberal
High Peak	William Sidebottom	Conservative
Hitchin	Robert Dimsdale	Conservative
Holborn	Francis Duncan	Conservative
Holderness	George Bethell	Conservative
Holmfirth	Henry Wilson	Liberal
Honiton	Sir John Kennaway, Bt	Conservative
Horncastle	Hon. Edward Stanhope	Conservative
Hornsey	Sir James McGarel-Hogg, Bt	Conservative
Horsham	Sir Walter Barttelot, Bt	Conservative
Houghton-le-Spring	Nicholas Wood	Conservative
Howdenshire	Arthur Duncombe	Conservative
Hoxton	James Stuart	Liberal
Huddersfield	William Summers	Liberal
Huntingdon	Arthur Smith-Barry	Conservative
Hyde	Joseph Watson Sidebotham	Conservative
Hythe	Sir Edward Watkin, Bt	Liberal Unionist
== I ==
Ilkeston	Thomas Watson	Liberal
Ince	Henry Blundell	Conservative
Inverness District of Burghs	Robert Finlay	Liberal Unionist
Inverness-shire	Charles Fraser-Mackintosh	Liberal Unionist (Crofters')
Ipswich (2 members)	Charles Dalrymple	Conservative
Ipswich (2 members)	Lord Elcho	Conservative
Isle of Thanet	Edward King-Harman	Conservative
Isle of Wight	Sir Richard Webster	Conservative
Islington East	Cowley Lambert	Conservative
Islington North	George Trout Bartley	Conservative
Islington South	Sir Albert Rollit	Conservative
Islington West	Richard Chamberlain	Liberal Unionist
== J ==
Jarrow	Charles Palmer	Liberal
== K ==
Keighley	Isaac Holden	Liberal
Kendal	Earl of Bective	Conservative
Kennington	Robert Gent-Davis	Conservative
Kensington North	Sir Roper Lethbridge	Conservative
Kensington South	Sir Algernon Borthwick	Conservative
Kerry East	Jeremiah Sheehan	Irish Parliamentary Party
Kerry North	John Stack	Irish Parliamentary Party
Kerry South	John O'Connor	Irish Parliamentary Party
Kerry West	Edward Harrington	Irish Parliamentary Party
Kidderminster	Sir Augustus Godson	Conservative
Kildare North	James Laurence Carew	Irish Parliamentary Party
Kildare South	James Leahy	Irish Parliamentary Party
Kilkenny City	Thomas Quinn	Irish Parliamentary Party
County Kilkenny North	Edward Marum	Irish Parliamentary Party
County Kilkenny South	Patrick Chance	Irish Parliamentary Party
Kilmarnock Burghs	Stephen Williamson	Liberal
Kincardineshire	Sir George Balfour	Liberal
King's Lynn	Robert Bourke	Conservative
Kingston upon Hull Central	Seymour King	Conservative
Kingston upon Hull East	Frederick Brent Grotrian	Conservative
Kingston upon Hull West	Charles Wilson	Liberal
Kingston-upon-Thames	Sir John Ellis, Bt	Conservative
Kingswinford	Alexander Staveley Hill	Conservative
Kirkcaldy District of Burghs	Sir George Campbell	Liberal
Kirkcudbrightshire	Mark MacTaggart-Stewart	Conservative
Knutsford	Hon. Alan Egerton	Conservative
== L ==
Lambeth North	Charles Craufurd Fraser	Conservative
Lanarkshire Mid	Stephen Mason	Liberal
Lanarkshire North East	Donald Crawford	Liberal
Lanarkshire North West	Robert Bontine Cunninghame-Graham	Liberal-Labour
Lanarkshire South	James Hozier	Conservative
Lancaster	James Williamson	Liberal
Launceston	Thomas Dyke Acland	Liberal
Leeds Central	Gerald Balfour	Conservative
Leeds East	John Gane	Liberal
Leeds North	William Jackson	Conservative
Leeds South	Sir Lyon Playfair	Liberal
Leeds West	Herbert Gladstone	Liberal
Leek	Harry Davenport	Conservative
Leicester (two members)	Alexander McArthur	Liberal
Leicester (two members)	James Picton	Liberal
Leigh	Caleb Wright	Liberal
Leith District of Burghs	William Ewart Gladstone	Liberal
Leitrim North	Michael Conway	Irish Parliamentary Party
Leitrim South	Luke Hayden	Irish Parliamentary Party
Leix	Richard Lalor	Irish Parliamentary Party
Leominster	James Rankin	Conservative
Lewes	Sir Henry Fletcher, Bt	Conservative
Lewisham	Viscount Lewisham	Conservative
Lichfield	Sir John Swinburne, Bt	Liberal
Limehouse	Edward Samuel Norris	Conservative
Limerick City	Henry Joseph Gill	Irish Parliamentary Party
County Limerick East	John Finucane	Irish Parliamentary Party
County Limerick West	William Abraham	Irish Parliamentary Party
Lincoln	Frederick Kerans	Conservative
Linlithgowshire	Peter McLagan	Liberal
Liverpool Abercromby	William Lawrence	Conservative
Liverpool East Toxteth	Baron Henry de Worms	Conservative
Liverpool Everton	Edward Whitley	Conservative
Liverpool Exchange	David Duncan	Liberal
Liverpool Kirkdale	Sir George Baden-Powell	Conservative
Liverpool Scotland	T. P. O'Connor	Irish Parliamentary Party
Liverpool Walton	John George Gibson	Conservative
Liverpool West Derby	Lord Claud Hamilton	Conservative
Liverpool West Toxteth	Thomas Royden	Conservative
City of London (two members)	John Hubbard	Conservative
City of London (two members)	Sir Robert Fowler, Bt	Conservative
London University	Sir John Lubbock, Bt	Liberal Unionist
Londonderry City	Charles Lewis	Irish Unionist
Londonderry North	Henry Mulholland	Irish Unionist
Londonderry South	Sir Thomas Lea, Bt	Liberal Unionist
Longford North	Justin McCarthy	Irish Parliamentary Party
Longford South	Laurence Connolly	Irish Parliamentary Party
North Lonsdale	William George Ainslie	Conservative
Loughborough	Edwin de Lisle	Conservative
Louth	Arthur Raymond Heath	Conservative
Louth North	Joseph Nolan	Irish Parliamentary Party
Louth South	T. P. Gill	Irish Parliamentary Party
Lowestoft	Sir Savile Crossley, Bt	Liberal Unionist
Ludlow	Robert Jasper More	Liberal Unionist
Luton	Cyril Flower	Liberal
== M ==
Macclesfield	William Bromley-Davenport	Conservative
Maidstone	Alexander Henry Ross	Conservative
Maldon	Charles Wing Gray	Conservative
Manchester East	Arthur Balfour	Conservative
Manchester North	Charles Schwann	Liberal
Manchester North East	Sir James Fergusson, Bt	Conservative
Manchester North West	William Houldsworth	Conservative
Manchester South	Sir Henry Roscoe	Liberal
Manchester South West	Jacob Bright	Liberal
Mansfield	Cecil Foljambe	Liberal
Marylebone East	Lord Charles Beresford	Conservative
Marylebone West	Sir Frederick Seager Hunt	Conservative
Mayo East	John Dillon	Irish Parliamentary Party
Mayo North	Daniel Crilly	Irish Parliamentary Party
Mayo South	J. F. X. O'Brien	Irish Parliamentary Party
Mayo West	John Deasy	Irish Parliamentary Party
Meath North	Pierce Mahony	Irish Parliamentary Party
Meath South	Edward Sheil	Irish Parliamentary Party
Medway	Hon. John Gathorne-Hardy	Conservative
Melton	Lord John Manners	Conservative
Merionethshire	T. E. Ellis	Liberal
Merthyr Tydfil (two members)	Henry Richard	Liberal
Merthyr Tydfil (two members)	Charles James	Liberal
Middlesbrough	Isaac Wilson	Liberal
Middleton	Thomas Fielden	Conservative
Midlothian	William Ewart Gladstone	Liberal
Mile End	Spencer Charrington	Conservative
Monaghan North	Pat O'Brien	Irish Parliamentary Party
Monaghan South	Sir Joseph Neale McKenna	Irish Parliamentary Party
Monmouth Boroughs	Sir George Elliot, Bt	Conservative
Monmouthshire North	Thomas Phillips Price	Liberal
Monmouthshire South	Hon. Frederick Courtenay Morgan	Conservative
Monmouthshire West	Marshall Warmington	Liberal
Montgomery District	Hon. Frederick Hanbury-Tracy	Liberal
Montgomeryshire	Stuart Rendel	Liberal
Montrose District of Burghs	John Shiress Will	Liberal
Morley	Charles Milnes Gaskell	Liberal
Morpeth	Thomas Burt	Liberal-Labour
== N ==
New Forest	Francis Compton	Conservative
Newark	Viscount Newark	Conservative
Newbury	William George Mount	Conservative
Newcastle-upon-Tyne (2 members)	John Morley	Liberal
Newcastle-upon-Tyne (2 members)	James Craig	Liberal
Newcastle-under-Lyme	Douglas Coghill	Liberal Unionist
Newington West	Charles Cooke	Conservative
Newmarket	George Newnes	Liberal
Newport	William Kenyon-Slaney	Conservative
Newry	Justin Huntly McCarthy	Irish Parliamentary Party
Newton	R. A. Cross	Conservative
Norfolk East	Sir Edward Birkbeck, Bt	Conservative
Norfolk Mid	Robert Gurdon	Liberal Unionist
Norfolk North	Herbert Cozens-Hardy	Liberal
Norfolk North West	Lord Henry Cavendish-Bentinck	Conservative
Norfolk South	Francis Taylor	Liberal Unionist
Norfolk South West	William Tyssen-Amherst	Conservative
Normanton	Benjamin Pickard	Liberal-Labour
Northampton (2 members)	Henry Labouchère	Liberal
Northampton (2 members)	Charles Bradlaugh	Liberal
Northamptonshire East	Francis Channing	Liberal
Northamptonshire Mid	Hon. Charles Spencer	Liberal
Northamptonshire North	Lord Burghley	Conservative
Northamptonshire South	Sir Rainald Knightley, Bt	Conservative
Northwich	Robert Verdin	Liberal Unionist
Norwich (2 members)	Jeremiah Colman	Liberal
Norwich (2 members)	Samuel Hoare	Conservative
Norwood	Thomas Bristowe	Conservative
Nottingham East	Arnold Morley	Liberal
Nottingham South	Henry Smith Wright	Conservative
Nottingham West	Henry Broadhurst	Liberal-Labour
Nuneaton	John Dugdale	Conservative
== O ==
Oldham (two members)	James Mackenzie Maclean	Conservative
Oldham (two members)	Elliott Lees	Conservative
Orkney and Shetland	Leonard Lyell	Liberal
Ormskirk	Arthur Forwood	Conservative
Osgoldcross	John Austin	Liberal
Ossory	William Archibald Macdonald	Irish Parliamentary Party
Oswestry	Stanley Leighton	Conservative
Otley	John Barran	Liberal
Oxford	Alexander William Hall	Conservative
Oxford University (two members)	Sir John Mowbray, Bt	Conservative
Oxford University (two members)	John Gilbert Talbot	Conservative
== P ==
Paddington North	Lionel Louis Cohen	Conservative
Paddington South	Lord Randolph Churchill	Conservative
Paisley	William Boyle Barbour	Liberal
Partick	Alexander Sellar	Liberal Unionist
Peckham	Arthur Anthony Baumann	Conservative
Peebles and Selkirk	Sir Walter Thorburn	Liberal Unionist
Pembroke and Haverfordwest District	Richard Mayne	Conservative
Pembrokeshire	William Davies	Liberal
Penrith	James Lowther	Conservative
Penryn and Falmouth	William Cavendish-Bentinck	Conservative
Perth	Charles Stuart Parker	Liberal
Perthshire Eastern	Robert Stewart Menzies	Liberal
Perthshire Western	Sir Donald Currie	Liberal Unionist
Peterborough	Hon. John Wentworth-FitzWilliam	Liberal Unionist
Petersfield	Viscount Wolmer	Liberal Unionist
Plymouth (2 members)	Sir Edward Clarke	Conservative
Plymouth (2 members)	Sir Edward Bates, Bt	Conservative
Pontefract	Hon. Rowland Winn	Conservative
Poplar	Sydney Buxton	Liberal
Portsmouth (2 members)	Sir William Crossman	Liberal Unionist
Portsmouth (2 members)	Sir Samuel Wilson	Conservative
Preston (2 members)	William Tomlinson	Conservative
Preston (2 members)	Robert William Hanbury	Conservative
Prestwich	Robert Mowbray	Conservative
Pudsey	Briggs Priestley	Liberal
== R ==
Radcliffe cum Farnworth	Robert Leake	Liberal
Radnorshire	Hon. Arthur Walsh	Conservative
Ramsey	William Fellowes	Conservative
Reading	Charles Townshend Murdoch	Conservative
Reigate	Sir James Lawrence, Bt	Conservative
Renfrewshire East	Hugh Shaw-Stewart	Conservative
Renfrewshire West	Sir Archibald Campbell, Bt	Conservative
Rhondda	William Abraham	Liberal-Labour
Richmond	George Elliot	Conservative
Ripon	John Lloyd Wharton	Conservative
Rochdale	Thomas Bayley Potter	Liberal
Rochester	Francis Hughes-Hallett	Conservative
Romford	James Theobald	Conservative
Roscommon North	James Joseph O'Kelly	Irish Parliamentary Party
Roscommon South	Andrew Commins	Irish Parliamentary Party
Ross	Michael Biddulph	Liberal Unionist
Ross and Cromarty	Roderick Macdonald	Liberal (Crofters')
Rossendale	The Marquess of Hartington	Liberal Unionist
Rotherham	Arthur Dyke Acland	Liberal
Rotherhithe	Charles Hamilton	Conservative
Roxburghshire	Hon. Arthur Elliot	Liberal Unionist
Rugby	Henry Peyton Cobb	Liberal
Rushcliffe	John Ellis	Liberal
Rutland	George Finch	Conservative
Rye	Arthur Montagu Brookfield	Conservative
== S ==
Saffron Walden	Herbert Gardner	Liberal
St Albans	Viscount Grimston	Conservative
St Andrews District of Burghs	Henry Torrens Anstruther	Liberal Unionist
St Augustine's	Aretas Akers-Douglas	Conservative
St Austell	William Copeland Borlase	Liberal
St George, Hanover Square	Lord Algernon Percy	Conservative
St George, Tower Hamlets	Charles Ritchie	Conservative
St Helens	Sir Henry Seton-Karr	Conservative
St Ives	Sir John St Aubyn, Bt	Liberal Unionist
St Pancras East	Robert Webster	Conservative
St Pancras North	Charles Cochrane-Baillie	Conservative
St Pancras South	Sir Julian Goldsmid, Bt	Liberal Unionist
St Pancras West	Harry Levy-Lawson	Liberal
Salford North	Edward Hardcastle	Conservative
Salford South	Sir Henry Hoyle Howorth	Conservative
Salford West	Lees Knowles	Conservative
Salisbury	Edward Hulse	Conservative
Scarborough	Joshua Rowntree	Liberal
Sevenoaks	Hon. Charles Mills	Conservative
Sheffield, Attercliffe	Hon. Bernard Coleridge	Liberal
Sheffield, Brightside	A. J. Mundella	Liberal
Sheffield, Central	Sir Howard Vincent	Conservative
Sheffield, Ecclesall	Sir Ellis Ashmead-Bartlett	Conservative
Sheffield, Hallam	Charles Stuart-Wortley	Conservative
Shipley	Joseph Craven	Liberal
Shrewsbury	James Watson	Conservative
Skipton	Walter Morrison	Liberal Unionist
Sleaford	Henry Chaplin	Conservative
Sligo North	Peter McDonald	Irish Parliamentary Party
Sligo South	Thomas Sexton	Irish Parliamentary Party
Somerset Eastern	Henry Hobhouse	Liberal Unionist
Somerset Northern	Evan Henry Llewellyn	Conservative
Somerset Southern	Viscount Kilcoursie	Liberal
South Molton	Viscount Lymington	Liberal Unionist
South Shields	James Cochran Stevenson	Liberal
Southampton (2 members)	Alfred Giles	Conservative
Southampton (2 members)	Sir John Edmund Commerell	Conservative
Southport	Hon. George Curzon	Conservative
Southwark West	Arthur Cohen	Liberal
Sowerby	Edward Crossley	Liberal
Spalding	Hon. Murray Finch-Hatton	Conservative
Spen Valley	Joseph Woodhead	Liberal
Stafford	Thomas Salt	Conservative
Staffordshire North West	Justinian Edwards-Heathcote	Conservative
Staffordshire West	Hamar Alfred Bass	Liberal Unionist
Stalybridge	Tom Harrop Sidebottom	Conservative
Stamford	John Compton Lawrance	Conservative
Stepney	Frederick Wootton Isaacson	Conservative
Stirling District of Burghs	Henry Campbell-Bannerman	Liberal
Stirlingshire	Joseph Cheney Bolton	Liberal
Stockport (2 members)	Louis John Jennings	Conservative
Stockport (2 members)	Sydney Gedge	Conservative
Stockton-on-Tees	Joseph Dodds	Liberal
Stoke-upon-Trent	William Leatham Bright	Liberal
Stowmarket	Edward Greene	Conservative
Strand	William Smith	Conservative
Stratford upon Avon	Frederick Townsend	Conservative
Stretford	John Maclure	Conservative
Stroud	George Holloway	Conservative
Sudbury	Cuthbert Quilter	Liberal Unionist
Sunderland (2 members)	Sir Edward Temperley Gourley	Liberal
Sunderland (2 members)	Samuel Storey	Liberal
Sutherlandshire	Angus Sutherland	Liberal (Crofters')
Swansea District	Sir Henry Vivian, Bt	Liberal Unionist
Swansea Town	Lewis Llewelyn Dillwyn	Liberal
== T ==
Tamworth	Philip Muntz	Conservative
Taunton	Hon. Samuel Allsopp	Conservative
Tavistock	Viscount Ebrington	Liberal Unionist
Tewkesbury	Sir John Dorington, Bt	Conservative
Thirsk and Malton	Lewis Payn Dawnay	Conservative
Thornbury	Hon. John Plunkett	Conservative
Tipperary East	Thomas Condon	Irish Parliamentary Party
Tipperary Mid	Thomas Mayne	Irish Parliamentary Party
Tipperary North	Patrick Joseph O'Brien	Irish Parliamentary Party
Tipperary South	John O'Connor	Irish Parliamentary Party
Tiverton	William Walrond	Conservative
Torquay	Richard Mallock	Conservative
Totnes	Francis Bingham Mildmay	Liberal Unionist
Tottenham	Joseph Howard	Conservative
Truro	William Bickford-Smith	Liberal Unionist
Tullamore	Joseph Francis Fox	Irish Parliamentary Party
Tunbridge	Robert Norton	Conservative
Tynemouth	Richard Donkin	Conservative
Tyneside	Wentworth Beaumont	Liberal
Tyrone East	William James Reynolds	Irish Parliamentary Party
Tyrone Mid	Matthew Joseph Kenny	Irish Parliamentary Party
Tyrone North	Lord Ernest Hamilton	Irish Unionist
Tyrone South	Thomas Russell	Liberal Unionist
== U ==
Uxbridge	Frederick Dixon-Hartland	Conservative
== W ==
Wakefield	Sir Edward Green, Bt	Conservative
Walsall	Sir Charles Forster, Bt	Liberal
Walthamstow	William Makins	Conservative
Walworth	Lewis Henry Isaacs	Conservative
Wandsworth	Henry Kimber	Conservative
Wansbeck	Charles Fenwick	Liberal-Labour
Warrington	Robert Pierpont	Conservative
Warwick and Leamington	Arthur Peel	Liberal Unionist
Waterford City	Richard Power	Irish Parliamentary Party
Waterford East	Patrick Power	Irish Parliamentary Party
Waterford West	Douglas Pyne	Irish Parliamentary Party
Watford	Frederick Halsey	Conservative
Wednesbury	Hon. Philip Stanhope	Liberal
Wellington (Salop)	Alexander Brown	Liberal Unionist
Wellington (Somerset)	Charles Isaac Elton	Conservative
Wells	Sir Richard Paget, Bt	Conservative
West Bromwich	Ernest Spencer	Conservative
West Ham North	Forrest Fulton	Conservative
West Ham South	George Banes	Conservative
Westbury	George Fuller	Liberal
Westhoughton	Frank Hardcastle	Conservative
Westmeath North	James Tuite	Irish Parliamentary Party
Westmeath South	Donal Sullivan	Irish Parliamentary Party
Westminster	William Burdett-Coutts	Conservative
Wexford North	John Redmond	Irish Parliamentary Party
Wexford South	John Barry	Irish Parliamentary Party
Whitby	Ernest Beckett	Conservative
Whitechapel	Samuel Montagu	Liberal
Whitehaven	George Cavendish-Bentinck	Conservative
Wick District of Burghs	John Macdonald Cameron	Liberal
Wicklow East	William Joseph Corbet	Irish Parliamentary Party
Wicklow West	Garrett Byrne	Irish Parliamentary Party
Widnes	Tom Edwards-Moss	Conservative
Wigan	Sir Francis Powell	Conservative
Wigtownshire	Sir Herbert Maxwell, Bt	Conservative
Wilton	Sir Thomas Grove, Bt	Liberal Unionist
Wimbledon	Cosmo Bonsor	Conservative
Winchester	Arthur Loftus Tottenham	Conservative
Windsor	Robert Richardson-Gardner	Conservative
Wirral	Edward Cotton-Jodrell	Conservative
Wisbech	Charles William Selwyn	Conservative
Wokingham	Sir George Russell, Bt	Conservative
Wolverhampton East	Henry Fowler	Liberal
Wolverhampton South	Hon. Charles Pelham Villiers	Liberal Unionist
Wolverhampton West	William Chichele Plowden	Liberal
Woodbridge	Robert Lloyd-Anstruther	Conservative
Woodstock	Francis William Maclean	Liberal Unionist
Woolwich	Edwin Hughes	Conservative
Worcester	George Allsopp	Conservative
Worcestershire East	George Hastings	Liberal Unionist
Worcestershire North	Benjamin Hingley	Liberal Unionist
Wycombe	Viscount Curzon	Conservative
== Y ==
York (two members)	Alfred Pease	Liberal
York (two members)	Frank Lockwood	Liberal

== By-elections ==
- June 1887: County Carlow – James Patrick Mahon (Irish Liberal) succeeding John Aloysius Blake (Irish Parliamentary Party) who died 22 May 1887
- 21 September 1887: Kerry South – Denis Kilbride (Irish Parliamentary Party) succeeding John O'Connor (Irish Parliamentary Party) who had resigned
- 15 May 1890: Mid Tipperary – Henry Harrison (Irish Parliamentary Party) succeeding Thomas Mayne (Irish Parliamentary Party) who had resigned
- 30 May 1890: West Donegal – J. J. Dalton
- 26 August 1891: 1891 Lewisham by-election - John Penn (Conservative Party) succeeding Viscount Lewisham (Conservative Party) who had inherited his father's seat in the House of Lords.
- 6 November 1891: Cork City – Martin Flavin (Irish National Federation – Anti-Parnellite) succeeding Charles Stewart Parnell (Irish National League – Parnellite) who died 6 October.

== See also ==
- UK general election, 1886
- List of parliaments of the United Kingdom
