= 1903 South Meath by-election =

UK Parliamentary by-election

The 1903 South Meath by-election was a by-election held on 9 October 1903 for the British House of Commons constituency of South Meath.

The by-election was triggered by the death of the Independent Nationalist Member of Parliament (MP) James Laurence Carew.

The Irish Parliamentary Party nominated David Sheehy, a former member for South Galway, as its candidate. The former member for this constituency, John Howard Parnell, had lost to Carew in the previous general election due to an oversight which led to Carew being elected unopposed. Parnell was nominated as an Independent Nationalist. Sheehy was elected with more than twice the votes of Parnell.

== Result ==
South Meath by-election, 1903
Party	Candidate	Votes	%	±%
Irish Parliamentary	David Sheehy	2,245	68.5	N/A
Ind. Nationalist	John Howard Parnell	1,031	31.5	New
Majority		1,214	37.0	N/A
Turnout		3,276	54.8	N/A
Irish Parliamentary gain from Ind. Nationalist		Swing	N/A	

== See also ==
- List of United Kingdom by-elections
