= Patrick Fullam =

Irish politician (1847–1924)

Patrick Fullam (1847 – 18 January 1924) was an Irish nationalist politician who served briefly in the 1890s as Member of Parliament (MP) for South Meath, taking his seat in the House of Commons of the United Kingdom of Great Britain and Ireland.

== Political career ==
At the 1892 general election, Fullam stood as an Anti-Parnellite Irish National Federation candidate in South Meath, and in a two-way contest with a Parnellite candidate he won the seat by the narrow margin of 2,212 votes to 2199. However, the result was voided after an electoral petition, and at the resulting by-election on 17 February 1893, Jeremiah Jordan was elected in his place.

He died, a farmer, in Donore, County Meath on 18 January 1924.

Parliament of the United Kingdom
Preceded by Edward Sheil	Member of Parliament for South Meath; 1892 – 1893	Succeeded by Jeremiah Jordan
