= John Howard Parnell =

Irish politician (1843–1923)

Member of Parliament for South Meath
- In office 1895–1900
- Preceded by: Jeremiah Jordan
- Succeeded by: James Laurence Carew

Personal details
- Born: 1843
- Died: 3 May 1923 (aged 79/80)
- Party: Irish National League
- Spouse: Olivia Smythe
- Parent: John Henry Parnell (father)
- Relatives: Charles Stewart Parnell (brother); Anna Catherine Parnell (sister); Fanny Parnell (sister)
- Education: Trinity College Dublin

John Howard Parnell (1843 – 3 May 1923) was an older brother of the Irish Nationalist leader Charles Stewart Parnell and after his brother's death was himself a Parnellite Nationalist Member of Parliament, for South Meath from 1895 to 1900. From 1898 he was also Dublin City Marshal.

== Biography ==
John Howard Parnell was the fifth child of John Henry Parnell of Avondale, County Wicklow and of his wife Delia, daughter of Commodore Charles Stewart of the US Navy. They met when the twenty year old John Henry Parnell, now owner of Collure in Armagh and Clonmore in Carlow, decided, after the death of his father, to go on a long tour in America and Mexico with his cousin, Lord Powerscourt. Soon after they arrived in America they met in Washington Delia Tudor Stewart, a girl of seventeen, conspicuous in the social and political life of the city. In 1834 they were married in New York, and returned to Ireland.

John Howard Parnell was educated in Paris, Chipping Norton and School of Mining where he was awarded a certificate in Geology. At some point he joined the Armagh Light Infantry. Due to the terms of the bequest to the family, it was the younger son Charles who inherited the family estate of Avondale when their father died in 1859, while John inherited another estate in County Armagh.

John Howard Parnell was the first of the two brothers to stand for Parliament. He sought election as a Home Rule candidate for County Wicklow in the 1874 general election, but was unsuccessful. After this he went to Chambers County, Alabama, United States, where he was a cotton-grower and. later, a pioneering peach farmer, establishing the 700-acre (2.8 km^{2}) Sunny South Fruit Farm. He also founded the first Catholic congregation in that part of the state, now the Holy Family Catholic Church in Lanett, Alabama. (Quinlan-2004)

During his brother's years of supporting the Irish Land League in the 1880s, John's own land agents in his Armagh estate were involved in a number of evictions of tenants, reported in the press at the time (British Newspaper Archives). The high-profile nature of these evictions was probably due to the contrast of this behaviour, with that of his brother Charles' activities.

Parnell returned to Ireland when he inherited Avondale on Charles's death in October 1891, against the wishes of his brother, who had wanted to leave it to his wife Katharine (née Wood). He found the estate heavily mortgaged and eventually sold it in 1899 and five years later, at the suggestion of Horace Plunkett it was purchased by the State. It is open to public view, the local town Rathdrum, County Wicklow the location of the "Parnell National Memorial Park".

By this time the Irish Parliamentary Party had split over his brother's leadership, and John Howard Parnell stood unsuccessfully for West Wicklow as a Parnellite in 1892. However, he was successful as a Parnellite in South Meath in 1895, narrowly defeating the sitting anti-Parnellite Jeremiah Jordan by 43 votes. He intended to stand again at the general election of 1900, but lost the seat unexpectedly. J. L. Carew, a former Parnellite turned Healyite, was under attack in his own constituency of Dublin College Green because he had attended a royal function. On nomination day, Carew was nominated for South Meath. Parnell had expected no opposition and had not brought the fees necessary for nomination in a contested election. Carew was therefore returned unopposed. Carew subsequently stated in a letter to the press that his return was secured without his knowledge or consent, and offered to resign in favour of Parnell or any other candidate nominated by the constituency. However he was defeated at College Green and did not resign South Meath.

On Carew's death in 1903, John Howard Parnell did not secure the official Irish Parliamentary Party nomination for South Meath. He contested the seat as an independent Nationalist, but was defeated by the official Irish Parliamentary Party candidate David Sheehy by more than two to one.

He made a late marriage, in 1907, to Olivia Isabella Smythe, daughter of Colonel James Smythe and widow of Archibald Matier of Carlingford.

In his obituary in 1923, The Times commented that John "was like his brother in appearance, but differed from him in every other respect. He never spoke in the House of Commons, and was far better known in the members' chess room". His memoir of his more famous brother is an important source for the latter's biography. He was a member of Sackville Chess Club and competed for them in the Armstrong Cup.

John Howard Parnell died on 3 May 1923 and was buried in Deans Grange Cemetery.

In April 2021 his grave in Deans Grange Cemetery in need of repair was renovated by Shanaganagh memorials through John Howard Parnells Ancestors the Parnell family, John and David whom currently reside in County Meath.

== Legacy ==
John Howard Parnell is mentioned in James Joyce's Ulysses, where Bloom sees him wandering the streets in "Lestrygonians," and again in "Wandering Rocks".

The Parnell Society established the John Howard Parnell Memorial Garden Park in Valley, Alabama U.S.A.

== Publications ==
- Charles Stewart Parnell: A Memoir, with a foreword by Daniel Horgan, Constable London (1916)

== Sources ==
- F. S. L. Lyons, Charles Stewart Parnell, Collins London (1977)
- The Times (London), 14 July & 4 October 1900; 24 September 1903; 4 May 1923
- Brian M. Walker (ed.), Parliamentary Election Results in Ireland, 1801-1922, Royal Irish Academy, Dublin (1978)
- Who Was Who, 1916–1928
- D.J. Hickey, J.E. Doherty, A new Dictionary of Irish History from 1800, p. 386, Gill & MacMillan (2003) ISBN 0-7171-2520-3
- Quinlan, Kieran (2004) Strange Kin: Ireland and the American South. Baton Rouge, Louisiana: Louisiana State University Press ISBN 978-0-8071-2983-8
- Fair, John D. (April 2005) "Parnell and Peaches: A Study in the Construction of Historical Myth." Alabama Review

Parliament of the United Kingdom
Preceded by Jeremiah Jordan	Member of Parliament for Meath South; 1895 – 1900	Succeeded by James Laurence Carew
