= James Laurence Carew =

Irish politician (1853–1903)

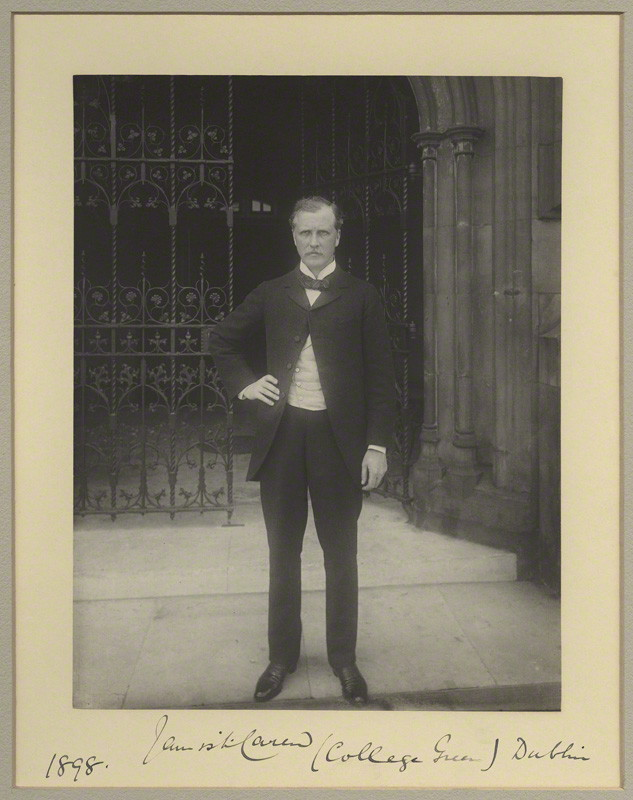
- Carew in 1898.

Member of Parliament for South Meath
- In office 1900–1903
- Preceded by: John Howard Parnell
- Succeeded by: David Sheehy

Member of Parliament for Dublin College Green
- In office 1896–1900
- Preceded by: J. E. Kenny
- Succeeded by: Joseph Nannetti

Member of Parliament for North Kildare
- In office 1885–1892
- Preceded by: New constituency
- Succeeded by: Patrick Kennedy

Personal details
- Born: 1853
- Died: 31 August 1903 (aged 49–50) St. Moritz, Switzerland
- Party: Independent Nationalist
- Other political affiliations: Irish National League; Irish Parliamentary Party
- Education: St Stanislaus College; Clongowes Wood College
- Alma mater: Trinity College Dublin

James Laurence Carew (1853 – 31 August 1903) was an Irish nationalist politician and member of parliament (MP) in the House of Commons of the United Kingdom. A member of the Irish Parliamentary Party and later a Parnellite, he was MP for North Kildare from 1885 to 1892, for Dublin College Green from 1896 to 1900, and for South Meath from 1900 until he died in 1903.

== Early life ==
Youngest son of Laurence Carew of Kildangan, Kinnegad, (then County Meath), County Westmeath, and Anne, older daughter of Garrett Robinson of Kilrainy, County Kildare.

Carew was educated at the Jesuit St Stanislaus' and Clongowes Wood Colleges and at Trinity College Dublin, where he graduated in 1873. He was called to the Bar at Lincoln's Inn, London, in July 1874, and then practised as an equity draftsman and conveyancer.

== Career ==
He was elected to Parliament for North Kildare in the Irish Parliamentary Party landslide in the 1885 general election by a large majority over the Conservative candidate, and returned unopposed in the election of the following year. He assisted J. J. Clancy in running the Irish Press Agency in London. During the Land War, in February 1889, he was prosecuted for a speech calling for the boycott of the Earl of Drogheda. Following his arrest, in Perthshire, Scotland, while campaigning in support of a Liberal by-election candidate, he was sentenced to four months imprisonment and confined in Kilkenny, and later Kilmainham Gaols.

When the Irish Parliamentary Party split in December 1890 over the leadership of Charles Stewart Parnell, Carew supported the latter. He then acted as one of the whips of the Parnellite parliamentary party. In the subsequent bitter 1892 general election, he was defeated by an Anti-Parnellite Irish National Federation candidate by 56 to 44 percent. He contested North Kildare again in 1895 and was defeated by a slightly smaller margin of 53 to 47 percent. The following year the opportunity to return to the House of Commons arose when his fellow Parnellite Dr. J. E. Kenny resigned from the strongly Parnellite seat of Dublin College Green. Carew was selected and returned unopposed.

Later in this parliamentary term, Carew came under attack in the Irish Nationalist movement for attending royal functions. He also became associated with the Healyite faction in the House of Commons. Consequently, in 1900, he was opposed in Dublin College Green by a new Nationalist candidate, Joseph Nannetti. Although the exact circumstances appear to be disputed, he was additionally nominated for his native seat of South Meath, and elected unopposed because the sitting member John Howard Parnell, expecting no opposition, omitted to submit the fees necessary for nomination in a contested election. Carew subsequently stated in a letter to the press that his return at South Meath was secured without his knowledge or consent, and offered to resign in favour of Parnell or any other candidate nominated by the constituency. However, he was defeated at College Green and did not resign from South Meath.

At the subsequent National Convention of the United Irish League, Carew was excluded from the Irish Parliamentary Party, along with Timothy Healy. Whereas Healy was later reconciled, temporarily, with the IPP, Carew did not live long enough for this to occur. He died suddenly three years later, after having recently been appointed High Sheriff of Kildare.

== Personal life ==
In 1896, he married Helen (née Wyllie) Kennard (1856–1928), widow of Hugh Coleridge Kennard of the Grenadier Guards and mother of Sir Coleridge Kennard, 1st Baronet.

He died suddenly on 31 August 1903, while on holiday at St Moritz.

== Sources ==
- Freeman's Journal, 2 October 1886, 12 December 1900, 1 September 1903
- The Times (London), 27 November 1885, 22 February and 5 March 1889, 5 July 1892, 14 July and 4 October 1900
- Brian M. Walker (ed.), Parliamentary Election Results in Ireland, 1801–1922, Dublin, Royal Irish Academy, 1978
- Who Was Who, 1897–1916

Parliament of the United Kingdom
New constituency	Member of Parliament for North Kildare; 1885 to 1892	Succeeded by Patrick Kennedy
Preceded by J. E. Kenny	Member of Parliament for Dublin College Green; 1896 to 1900	Succeeded by Joseph Nannetti
Preceded by John Howard Parnell	Member of Parliament for South Meath; 1900 to 1903	Succeeded by David Sheehy
