= South Meath =

Former parliamentary constituency in the United Kingdom

- Former county constituency for the House of Commons

1885–1922
- Seats: 1
- Created from: County Meath
- Replaced by: Louth–Meath

South Meath was a UK Parliament constituency in Ireland, returning one Member of Parliament (MP) from 1885 to 1922.

Prior to the 1885 general election the area was part of the County Meath constituency. From 1922, on the establishment of the Irish Free State, it was not represented in the UK Parliament.

== Boundaries ==
This constituency comprised the southern part of County Meath.

1885–1922: The baronies of Deece Lower, Deece Upper, Duleek Lower, Duleek Upper, Dunboyne, Lune, Moyfenrath Lower, Moyfenrath Upper, Navan Upper and Ratoath, that part of the barony of Navan Lower contained within the parishes of Churchtown and Rataine, and that part of the barony of Skreen not contained within the constituency of North Meath.

== Members of Parliament ==
Election	Member	Party
1885	Edward Sheil	Irish Parliamentary Party
1891	Edward Sheil	Parnellite
1892	Patrick Fulham	Irish National Federation
1893 by-election	Jeremiah Jordan	Irish National Federation
1895	John Howard Parnell	Parnellite
1900	James Laurence Carew	Independent Nationalist
1903	David Sheehy	Irish Parliamentary Party
1918	Eamonn Duggan	Sinn Féin
1922	constituency abolished	

== Elections ==
=== Elections in the 1880s ===
1885 general election: South Meath
Party	Candidate	Votes	%	±%
Irish Parliamentary	Edward Sheil	Unopposed		
Registered electors		6,324		
Irish Parliamentary win (new seat)				

1886 general election: South Meath
Party	Candidate	Votes	%	±%
Irish Parliamentary	Edward Sheil	Unopposed		
Registered electors		6,324		
Irish Parliamentary hold				

=== Elections in the 1890s ===
1892 general election: South Meath
Party	Candidate	Votes	%	±%
Irish National Federation	Patrick Fullam	2,212	50.1	N/A
Irish National League	J. J. Dalton	2,199	49.9	N/A
Majority		13	0.2	N/A
Turnout		4,411	79.6	N/A
Registered electors		5,538		
Irish National Federation gain from Irish Parliamentary		Swing	N/A	

On petition, Fullam was unseated causing a by-election.

By-election, 1893: South Meath
Party	Candidate	Votes	%	±%
Irish National Federation	Jeremiah Jordan	2,707	50.6	+0.5
Irish National League	J. J. Dalton	2,638	49.4	−0.5
Majority		69	1.2	+1.0
Turnout		5,345	76.5	−3.1
Registered electors		6,983		
Irish National Federation hold		Swing	+0.5	

1895 general election: South Meath
Party	Candidate	Votes	%	±%
Irish National League	John Howard Parnell	2,380	50.5	+0.6
Irish National Federation	Jeremiah Jordan	2,337	49.5	−0.6
Majority		43	1.0	N/A
Turnout		4,717	78.9	−0.7
Registered electors		5,978		
Irish National League gain from Irish National Federation		Swing	+0.6	

=== Elections in the 1900s ===
1900 general election: South Meath
Party	Candidate	Votes	%	±%
Healyite Nationalist	James Laurence Carew	Unopposed		
Registered electors		6,362		
Healyite Nationalist gain from Irish National League				

Carew's death prompted a by-election.

By-election 1903: South Meath
Party	Candidate	Votes	%	±%
Irish Parliamentary	David Sheehy	2,245	68.5	N/A
Ind. Nationalist	John Howard Parnell	1,031	31.5	New
Majority		1,214	37.0	N/A
Turnout		3,276	54.8	N/A
Registered electors		5,980		
Irish Parliamentary gain from Healyite Nationalist		Swing	N/A	

1906 general election: South Meath
Party	Candidate	Votes	%	±%
Irish Parliamentary	David Sheehy	Unopposed		
Registered electors		5,825		
Irish Parliamentary gain from Healyite Nationalist				

=== Elections in the 1910s ===
January 1910 general election: South Meath
Party	Candidate	Votes	%	±%
Irish Parliamentary	David Sheehy	Unopposed		
Registered electors		5,584		
Irish Parliamentary hold				

December 1910 general election: South Meath
Party	Candidate	Votes	%	±%
Irish Parliamentary	David Sheehy	Unopposed		
Registered electors		5,584		
Irish Parliamentary hold				

1918 general election: South Meath
Party	Candidate	Votes	%	±%
Sinn Féin	Eamonn Duggan	6,371	70.4	New
Irish Parliamentary	Thomas Peter O'Donoghue	2,680	29.6	N/A
Majority		3,691	40.8	N/A
Turnout		9,051	61.5	N/A
Registered electors		14,716		
Sinn Féin gain from Irish Parliamentary		Swing	N/A	
