= David Sheehy =

Irish politician (1844–1932)

David Sheehy in 1906

David Sheehy (1844 – 17 December 1932) was an Irish nationalist politician. He was a member of parliament (MP) from 1885 to 1900 and from 1903 to 1918, taking his seat as a member of the Irish Parliamentary Party in the House of Commons of the United Kingdom of Great Britain and Ireland.

== Political career ==
Born in Limerick, he was a student for the priesthood at the Irish College in Paris, but left due to a cholera epidemic and later married Bessie McCoy ( Conor said they eloped, but they were both 25 years old and both fathers were witnesses at the wedding). In his youth he was a member of the IRB and was active in the Land League. He was imprisoned on six occasions for his part in the Land War.

At the 1885 general election he was elected unopposed as MP for South Galway and held that seat until the 1900 general election. His re-election in Galway was unopposed in 1886 and 1895. When the Irish Party split over the leadership of Charles Stewart Parnell, Sheehy joined the anti-Parnellite Irish National Federation majority. At the 1892 general election, Sheehy joined was opposed by a Parnellite Irish National League candidate, whom he defeated with a majority of nearly two to one. In the same election he stood in Waterford City, but failed to unseat the Parnellite John Redmond.

The two factions of the Irish Parliamentary Party reunited for the general election in 1900, but Sheehy did not stand again and was out of parliament for the next three years. After the death in August 1903 of James Laurence Carew, the Independent Nationalist MP for South Meath, Sheehy was selected as the Irish Parliamentary Party candidate in the resulting by-election in October 1903. Carew had allegedly been elected in 1900 as a result of a series of errors in nominations, and his predecessor John Howard Parnell stood again, this time as an Independent Nationalist. Sheehy won with a majority of more than two to one, and held the seat until he stood down at the 1918 general election.

== Personal and family life ==
David was the son of Richard Sheehy and Johanna Shea, and was the brother of Mary Sheehy and Fr. Eugene Sheehy.

He and his wife, Bessie, had seven children, of whom six survived to adulthood. One of his daughters, Mary (born 1884) married the MP Tom Kettle and had one daughter, Betty (1913–1996). Hanna (born 1877), became a teacher and married the writer Francis Skeffington; they had one son, Owen, who was seven years old when his father was murdered by the Captain Bowen-Colthurst in Portobello Barracks, Rathmines, during the 1916 Rising. Kathleen married Freeman's Journal and Irish Independent journalist Frank Cruise O'Brien; the contrarian politician and writer Conor Cruise O'Brien was their son. Margaret (born 1879), an elocutionist, actress and playwright, married solicitor Frank Culhane; they had four children; after his death she married her godson, the poet Michael Casey. Sheehy's two sons, Richard and Eugene, were barristers.

The writer James Joyce, who lived nearby as a youth, often visited the family home, 2 Belvedere Place, where musical evenings and theatricals took place every Sunday evening. Joyce entertained the family with Italian songs. In 1900 Margaret wrote a play in which the Sheehys and their friends, including Joyce, acted. Joyce took a particular liking to Eugene and had a long-lasting but unrequited crush on Mary. Joyce's novel Ulysses wittily describes an encounter between David Sheehy's wife, Bessie, and Father John Conmee, SJ, rector of Clongowes. Their daughter Mary is the spéirbhean longingly pursued by the protagonist in the story "Araby" in Joyce's collection Dubliners. Another daughter, Kathleen, may have been the model for the mockingly nationalist Miss Ivors in the story "The Dead", which concludes Dubliners.

When David Sheehy died in Dublin aged 88 it was reported that he had been the oldest surviving member of the Irish Parliamentary Party.

Parliament of the United Kingdom
New constituency	Member of Parliament for South Galway; 1885–1900	Succeeded by William Duffy
Preceded by James Laurence Carew	Member of Parliament for South Meath; 1903–1918	Succeeded by Eamonn Duggan
