= Jeremiah Jordan =

Irish politician (1830–1911)

Jeremiah Jordan in 1906

Jeremiah Jordan J.P. (1830 – 31 December 1911) was an Irish nationalist politician from County Fermanagh. He was a Member of Parliament (MP) from 1885 to 1892, and from 1893 to 1910, taking his seat in the House of Commons of the United Kingdom of Great Britain and Ireland.

== Early life ==
Jordan was born in Tattenbar, eldest son of Samuel Jordan, farmer, and was educated at the Mullinaburtlin National School, as well as at the Portora Royal School in Enniskillen. He is buried in Aghavea Church of Ireland churchyard, situated about 3 miles outside the village of Maguiresbridge in County Fermanagh.

A merchant by profession, he became a member of the Fermanagh Urban Council, the Enniskillen Board of Guardians, the Fermanagh C.C. and of the Joint Committee of the Asylum for Tyrone and Fermanagh.

He was connected with Temperance and kindred movements for many years. He was a member of the Tenant's Association, the Land League, the Irish National League and the United Irish League (UIL), successively. In 1902 he became the first nationalist chairman of Fermanagh County Council.

The local branch of the UIL in Enniskillen which was largely dominated by working-class members was disaffiliated after it criticised merchants who dominated nationalist politics in the town – notably Jeremiah Jordan and his successor, Patrick Crumley – for decorating shops with Union Jacks and subscribing to a military monument.

== Political career ==
From 1865, Jordan supported the Liberal party in Enniskillen municipal and parliamentary elections against the dominant Cole Earl of Enniskillen and Crichton Earl of Erne interests. In the early 1870s he joined the Home Rule League of Isaac Butt and spoke alongside Butt at an Enniskillen meeting in 1873. In 1880 he joined the Land League and helped to secure extensive Protestant support for it in Fermanagh by arguing that it was a law-abiding body whose principal aim was to help Gladstone and Bright overcome resistance to further land reform.

Most of this Protestant support died away after the Land Law (Ireland) Act 1881 and the agrarian violence of 1881–82. After the Kilmainham Treaty Jordan definitively committed himself to nationalism by joining the Irish National League.

A Protestant Nationalist member of the Irish Parliamentary Party, Jordan was elected at the 1885 general election as MP for the West Clare. His only opponent was a Conservative, who won less than 4% of the votes. He was returned unopposed in 1886. When the Irish Party split in 1891 over the leadership of Charles Stewart Parnell, Jordan was the first Nationalist MP to call for Parnell's resignation, partly because of his close association with the English Methodist spokesman Hugh Price Hughes.

At the 1892 general election he did not stand again in West Clare (where the Parnellite Irish National League candidate won a large majority), but in North Fermanagh, where he lost the seat to a Unionist candidate. However, the election in South Meath was voided after an electoral petition, and at the resulting by-election on 17 February 1893, Jordan won the seat in a close contest with the Parnellite candidate.

At the 1895 general election, Jordan narrowly lost the South Meath seat to Parnell's older brother, John Howard Parnell. However, he had also stood in South Fermanagh, where he was elected with a comfortable majority. He was returned in that constituency at the 1900, 1906 and January 1910. By then he was 80 years old, and after suffering a series of strokes he did not contest the December 1910 general election. He died a year later at High Street, Enniskillen, aged 81, according to some accounts, or 83, according to his death certificate.

== Notes ==
Parliament of the United Kingdom
New constituency	Member of Parliament for West Clare; 1885 – 1892	Succeeded by James Rochfort Maguire
Preceded by Patrick Fulham	Member of Parliament for South Meath; 1893 – 1895	Succeeded by John Howard Parnell
Preceded by Patrick McGilligan	Member of Parliament for South Fermanagh; 1895 – 1910	Succeeded by Patrick Crumley
