= Irish National League =

19th-century nationalist political party in Ireland

- Secretary: Timothy Harrington
- Founder: Charles Stewart Parnell
- Founded: 1882
- Dissolved: 1900
- Preceded by: Irish National Land League
- Ideology: Irish nationalism; Irish Home Rule; Parnellite
- Political position: Centre-left
- National affiliation: Irish Parliamentary Party
- Colours: Green

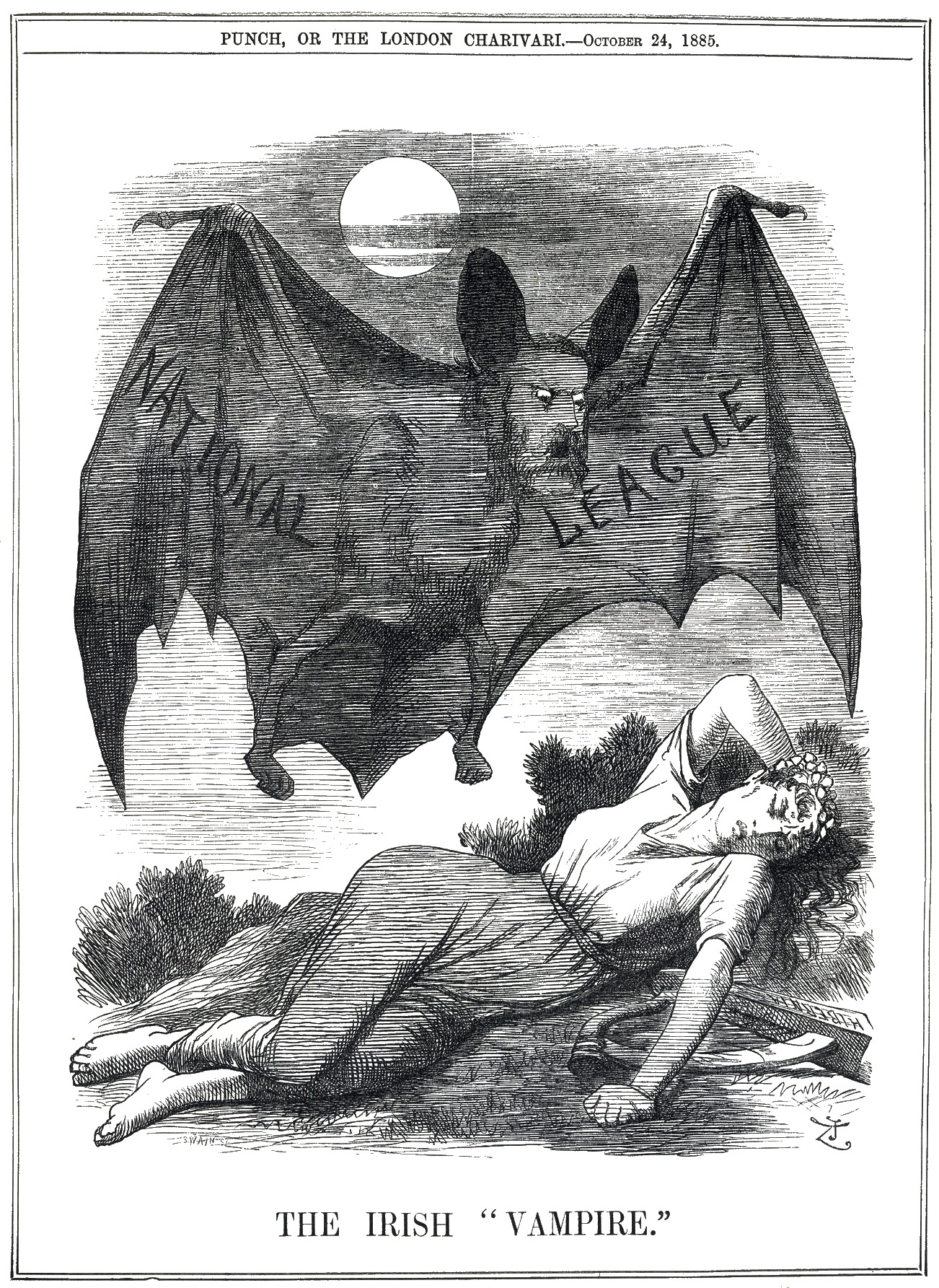
A hostile Punch cartoon, from 1885, depicting the Irish National League as the "Irish Vampire", with Parnell's head

The Irish National League (INL) was a nationalist political party in Ireland. It was founded on 17 October 1882 by Charles Stewart Parnell as the successor to the Irish National Land League after this was suppressed. Whereas the Land League had agitated for land reform, the National League also campaigned for self-government or Irish Home Rule, further enfranchisement and economic reforms.

The League was the main base of support for the Irish Parliamentary Party (IPP), and under Parnell's leadership, it grew quickly to over 1,000 branches throughout the island. In 1884, the League secured the support of the Catholic Church in Ireland. Its secretary was Timothy Harrington who organised the Plan of Campaign in 1886. The Irish League was effectively controlled by the Parliamentary Party, which in turn was controlled by Parnell, who chaired a small group of MPs who vetted and imposed candidates on constituencies.

In December 1890, the IPP split on the issues of Parnell's relationship with Katharine O'Shea, the wife of William O'Shea, a former MP, who named Parnell in divorce proceedings. The majority of the League, which opposed Parnell, broke away to form the Anti-Parnellite Irish National Federation (INF) under Justin McCarthy. After Parnell's death in 1891, John Redmond assumed the leadership of the remaining Parnellite INL. In the 1892 general election the combined factions retained the Irish nationalist pro-Home Rule vote and their 81 seats.

Early in 1900, the Irish National League (INL) merged with the United Irish League and the Irish National Federation (INF) to form a reunited Irish Parliamentary Party under Redmond's leadership returning 77 seats in the 1900 general election, together with five Healyite Nationalists, in all 82 pro-Home Rule seats.

== Informal judicial system ==
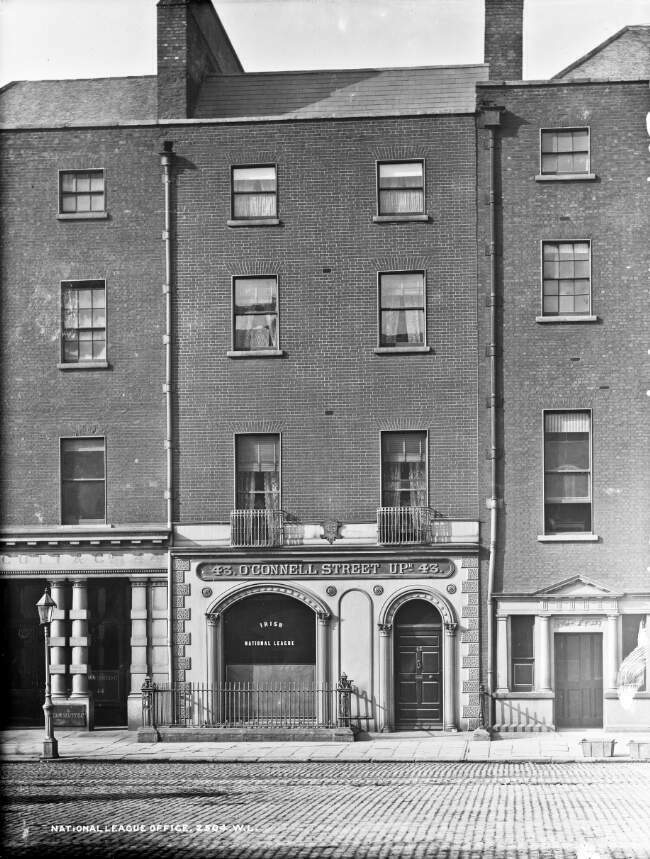
43 O'Connell Street Upper (Irish National League headquarters)

The National League maintained a code based on the writings of Young Irelander James Fintan Lalor which regulated transactions relating to the land. The ideological underpinning of the code was the idea that the land of Ireland rightfully belonged to the Irish people, but had been stolen by English invaders. The key provisions forbade paying rent without abatements, taking over land from which a tenant had been evicted, and purchasing their holding under the 1885 Ashbourne Act. Other forbidden actions included "participating in evictions, fraternizing with, or entering into, commerce with anyone who did; or working for, hiring, letting land from, or socializing with, boycotted person".

The League enforced its code by means of informal tribunals, typically led by the leaders of local chapters. Although there was a long history of such courts by Irish agrarian radicals stretching back to the 1760s, the National League's courts differed from previous iterations in that it held its proceedings openly and followed a common law procedure. This was intended to uphold the League's image of being in favour of the rule of law, just Irish law instead of English law.
