= Newman University Church =

- Church of Our Lady Seat of Wisdom
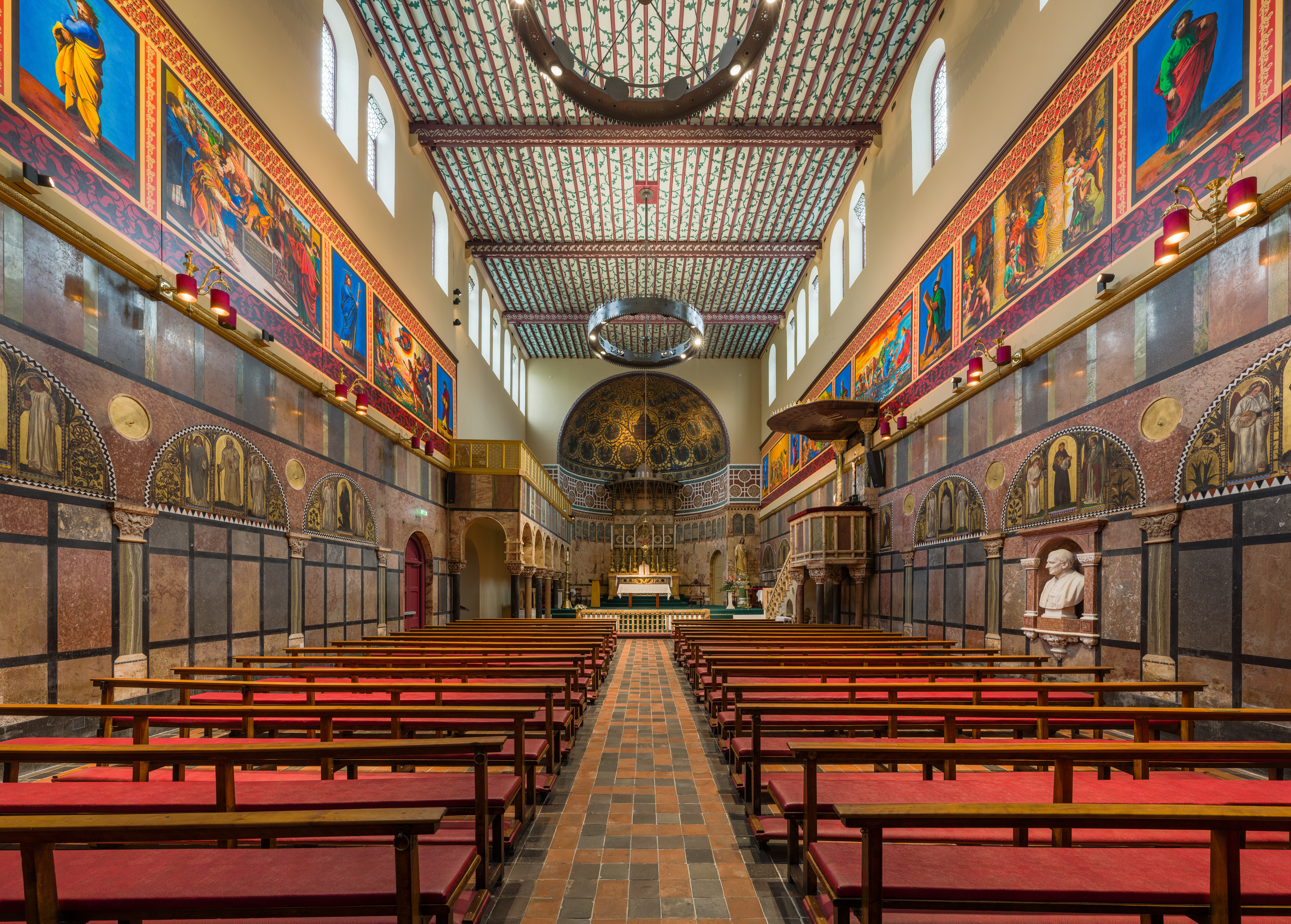
- View of the interior. Its bright colours and marble arches on the wall make Newman University Church very unusual for an Irish church.

- 53.336852°N 6.260539°W
- Location: 87A St Stephen's Green South, Dublin
- Country: Ireland
- Denomination: Roman Catholic
- Tradition: Latin
- Website: newman.nd.edu/university-church/

History
- Dedication: Mary, mother of Jesus (as Our Lady Seat of Wisdom)
- Consecrated: 1 May 1856

Architecture
- Functional status: Active
- Architect: John Hungerford Pollen (senior)
- Architectural type: Church
- Style: Byzantine Revival, Romanesque
- Groundbreaking: May 1855
- Construction cost: £5,600

Specifications
- Capacity: 250
- Length: 61 m (200 ft)
- Width: 12 m (39 ft)
- Materials: brick, slate, marble, serpentine, alabaster, wood, copper

Administration
- Archdiocese: Dublin
- Deanery: South City Centre
- Parish: University Church

The Church of Our Lady Seat of Wisdom, also known as Newman University Church or Catholic University Church, is a Catholic church in Dublin, Ireland.

== History ==
Groundbreaking took place on the site of the gardens of 87 St Stephen's Green in May 1855. It was founded by John Henry Newman for the newly founded Catholic University of Ireland, and designed by John Hungerford Pollen (senior) in a Byzantine Revival style, due to Newman's dislike of Gothic architecture. It was consecrated on Ascension Day (1 May) 1856. On 4 May (Saint Monica's Day), Newman preached in his sermon the essential place of the church in his plans for the university: "I wish in the same spots and the same individuals to be at once oracles of philosophy and shrines of devotion. [...] Devotion is not a sort of finish given to the sciences; nor is science a sort of feather in the cap."

The Lady Chapel was added to the church in 1875.

In 1907 it was the site of the funeral of the Fenian James Bermingham.

During the 1916 Easter Rising British soldiers established a machine-gun post on the roof of the church.

Future Taoiseach John A. Costello married Ida Mary O'Malley in the church in 1919.

Since 2016, the church has been stewarded by the University of Notre Dame, which uses the church as a base for the Notre Dame–Newman Center for Faith and Reason; regular masses are still held there.

== Church ==
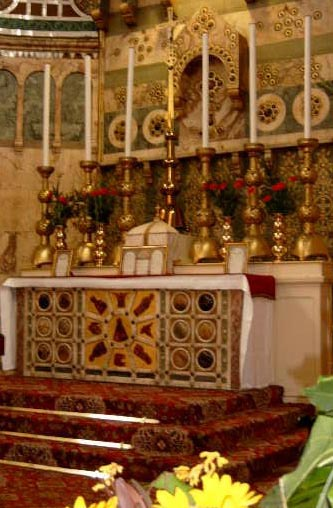
Altar with an altar ledge occupying the only space between it and the wall

The church is accessed by a Romanesque porch in polychromatic brick, with a belfry suspended over it. There is then an atrium leading into the ante-church, nave and sanctuary.

The interior is richly decorated with a baldacchino over the altar. The semi-dome above the sanctuary was inspired by the apse of the Basilica of San Clemente al Laterano, Rome. There is also an arcaded gallery with screens and an elaborate pulpit. The walls are decorated with marble and serpentine from many parts of Ireland. The empty undercroft represents the empty tomb, just as at Westminster Cathedral.

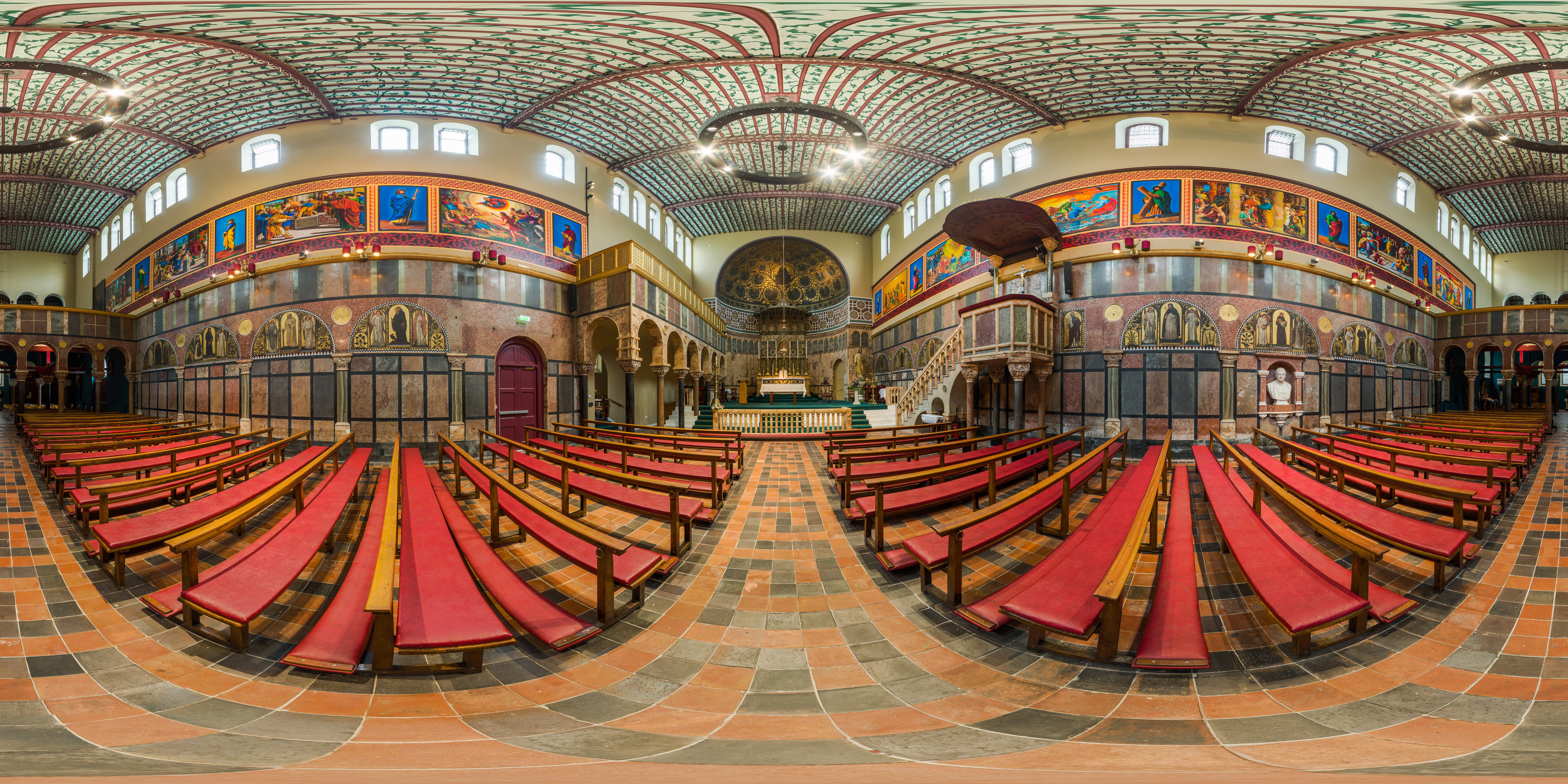
Panorama of the interior
