= Ida Mary Costello =

Wife of John A. Costello (1891–1956)

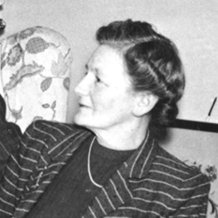
- Costello in 1948
- Born: Ida Mary O'Malley; 14 November 1891; Dublin, Ireland
- Died: 20 April 1956 (aged 64); Dublin, Ireland
- Education: University College Dublin
- Known for: Spouse of the Taoiseach (1948–1951, 1954–1956)
- Spouse: John A. Costello (m. 1919)
- Children: 5, including Declan

Ida Mary Costello (née O'Malley; 14 November 1891 – 20 April 1956) was the wife of John A. Costello, who served as Taoiseach on two occasions between 1948 and 1957.

== Biography ==
Ida Mary O'Malley was born in Dublin, the eldest of 13 children, seven boys and six girls. Her father, Dr. David O'Malley, was a very popular medical officer from Glenamaddy, County Galway. The O'Malley's were Redmondite Nationalists and at least four of her brothers joined the British Army during World War I, two of them being killed.

She was educated at the Dominican School in Eccles Street, Dublin, and spent the academic year 1907–1908 studying in Amiens, France on an early exchange programme. After taking a degree at University College Dublin, she later taught at her alma mater in Eccles Street.

She met John A. Costello at a dance in the Gresham Hotel in 1912, when he was still a law student. A relationship developed over the next seven years and they were married on 31 July 1919 at the Catholic University Church in St. Stephen's Green.

The Costello's spent the first four years of their marriage living in a flat at 22 Ely Place. They were living there when their first child, Wilfrid, was born in 1921. He suffered a cerebral haemorrhage during his birth which left him with a mild mental disability. He later developed epilepsy as a teenager. The Costellos eldest daughter, Grace, was born in 1922. She followed her father into law and married the solicitor and economist Alexis FitzGerald. In August 1923, the growing family moved to Herbert Park. A second son, Declan, was born in 1926. As well as following his father into law, he also served as a Teachta Dála (TD) before being made President of the High Court. Eavan Costello, the couples' second and youngest daughter, was born in 1927. She completed a history degree before moving to Cork. The youngest of the family, John, was born in 1931. He later became an architect.

John A. Costello was elected as a TD for Dublin County in 1933. He was elected Taoiseach in 1948, as head of the first inter-party government in Ireland. He served as head of government until 1951, however, he was re-elected for a second term in 1954. During her time as wife to the Taoiseach she kept a low profile and enjoyed a background role in her husbands' political career. She was at her husband's side in Canada in 1948, when he announced that the Irish Free State would be leaving the British Commonwealth and declaring itself a republic.

Ida Costello suffered from high blood pressure later in her adult life and in 1956 was diagnosed with chronic bacterial endocarditis, an inflammation of the lining of the heart. She was admitted to St. Vincent's Private Nursing Home in Leeson Street, but died from heart failure on 20 April 1956, at the age of 64.
