= Frank Fahy (politician) =

Irish politician (1879–1953)

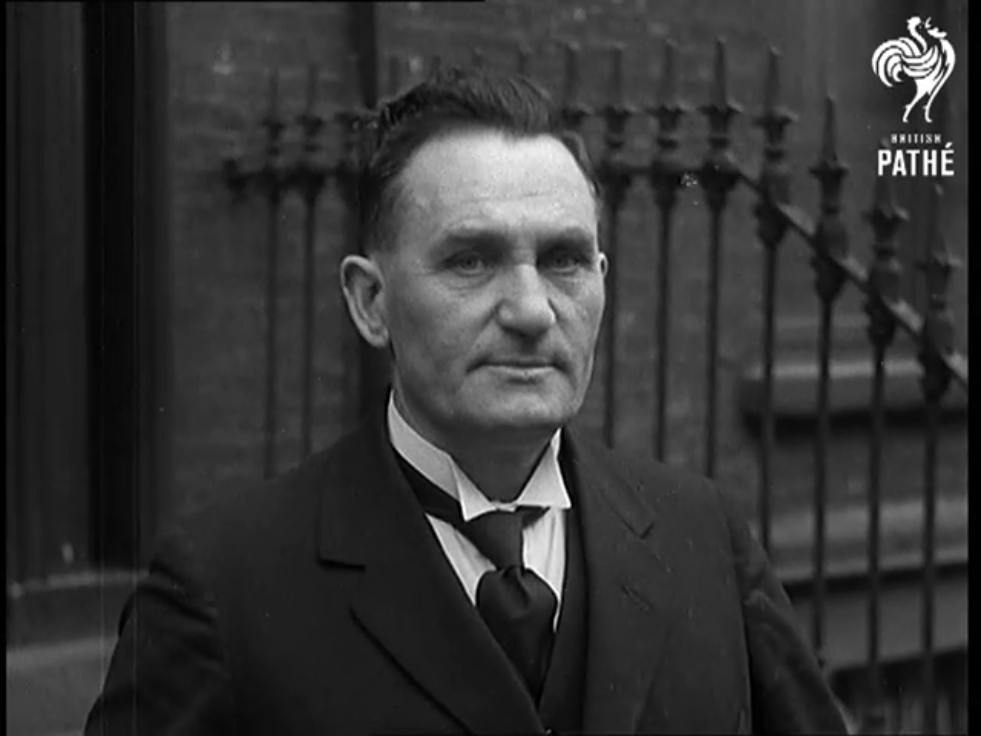
- Fahy in 1933

Ceann Comhairle of Dáil Éireann
- In office 9 March 1932 – 13 June 1951
- Preceded by: Michael Hayes
- Succeeded by: Patrick Hogan

Teachta Dála
- In office February 1948 – 12 July 1953
- Constituency: Galway South
- In office July 1937 – February 1948
- Constituency: Galway East
- In office May 1921 – July 1937
- Constituency: Galway
- In office December 1918 – May 1921
- Constituency: Galway South

Personal details
- Born: Francis Patrick Fahy; 23 May 1879 Kilchreest, County Galway, Ireland
- Died: 12 July 1953 (aged 73) Phibsborough, Dublin, Ireland
- Resting place: Deans Grange Cemetery, Dublin, Ireland
- Party: Fianna Fáil
- Spouse: Anna Barton (m. 1908)
- Education: University College Galway

Francis Patrick Fahy (23 May 1879 – 12 July 1953) was an Irish Fianna Fáil politician who served as Ceann Comhairle of Dáil Éireann from 1932 to 1951. He served as a Teachta Dála (TD) from 1919 to his death in 1953.

He was a Teachta Dála (TD) for 35 years, first for Sinn Féin and later as a member of Fianna Fáil, before becoming Ceann Comhairle (chairperson) for over 19 years.

== Early life and revolutionary period ==
Fahy was born on 23 May 1879 in the townland of Glanatallin, Kilchreest, County Galway, the eldest of 6 children born to John Fahy and Maria Jones. His father taught at the local National School. After an early education at his father's school in Kilchreest, he attended Mungret College in County Limerick. He later studied at University College Galway. He earned a Bachelor of Arts and a H.Dip. in Education, and a Diploma in Science.

From 1906 to 1921 he taught Latin, Irish and Science at Castleknock College (St Vincent's College), Dublin. Fahy qualified as a barrister in 1927 at King's Inns, and also taught at the Christian Brothers school in Tralee. He was at one time General Secretary of the Conradh na Gaeilge. He married Anna Barton of Tralee, a metal artist and member of the Cumann na mBan in 1908. They had no children.

As Company Captain of C Company, 1 Battalion, Dublin Brigade, Irish Volunteers, Fahy commanded the contingent that occupied the Four Courts during the 1916 Easter Rising. Arrested and sentenced to ten years in prison, he spent terms in several British prisons. Released in the general amnesty of June 1917, he was active in the reorganisation of the Volunteer movement, addressing public meetings throughout the country. Fahy was later awarded a pension by the Irish government under the Military Service Pensions Act, 1934 for his service with the Irish Volunteers between 1916 and 1917.

== Political career ==
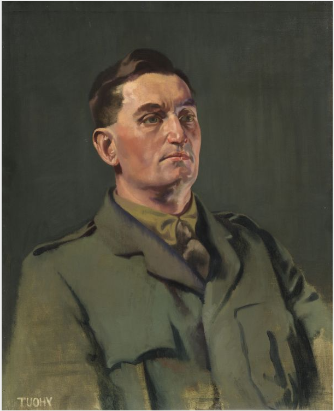
Frank Fahy by Patrick Tuohy

Fahy was first elected at the 1918 general election as a Sinn Féin Member of Parliament (MP) for Galway South, but as the party was pledged to abstentionism he did not take his seat in the British House of Commons and joined the revolutionary First Dáil. He was re-elected as TD for Galway in 1921 general election and having sided with the anti-treaty forces following the Anglo-Irish Treaty, he did not take his seat in either the 3rd Dáil or the 4th Dáil. Referring to the treaty, in 1922 Fahy said: "Can a Treaty based on fear, naked and unashamed, be a sound basis for friendship between the two peoples?"

He joined Fianna Fáil when the party was founded in 1926, and along with the 42 other Fianna Fáil TDs he took his seat in the 5th Dáil on 12 August 1927, three days before the Dáil tied 71 votes to 71 on a motion of no confidence in W. T. Cosgrave's Cumann na nGaedheal government (a tie broken by the Ceann Comhairle). After the government won two by-elections later that month, it dissolved the Dáil, leading to a fresh election.

After the September 1927 election, Cosgrave was able to form a minority government with the support of the Farmers' Party and some independent TDs. However, in the 1932 general election, Fianna Fáil won just under half of the seats and formed a government with the support of the Labour Party. The first business was of the 7th Dáil was the election of the Ceann Comhairle, and on 9 March 1932 Fahy was nominated for the position by Seán T. O'Kelly, winning the vote by a margin of 78 to 71.

He held the post until Fianna Fáil lost the 1951 election, and at the start of the 14th Dáil he did not offer himself for re-election as Ceann Comhairle. He was succeeded by the Labour TD Patrick Hogan. His 19 years in the chair remains the longest of any Ceann Comhairle, with the only other person to exceed 10 years as Ceann Comhairle being his successor, Patrick Hogan.

The 1932 election was the last which Fahy contested; as Ceann Comhairle, he was automatically re-elected at the next seven elections. When his Galway constituency was divided for the 1937 general election, he was returned unopposed for the new Galway East, and similarly in 1948 for the new Galway South constituency.

Fahy died on 12 July 1953, and is buried at Deans Grange Cemetery, Dublin. The Galway South by-election held after his death was won by the Fianna Fáil candidate Robert Lahiffe.

Captain Frank Fahy, Irish Volunteers (1915–1918); Dublin Castle Records, CO 904/193-216

Frank Fahy; Easter Rising Records. WO 35/206-207

Parliament of the United Kingdom
Preceded by William Duffy	Member of Parliament for Galway South; 1918–1922	Constituency abolished
Oireachtas
New constituency	Teachta Dála for Galway South; 1918–1921	Constituency abolished
Oireachtas
Preceded by Michael Hayes	Ceann Comhairle of Dáil Éireann; 1932–1951	Succeeded by Patrick Hogan

Dáil	Election	Deputy (Party)	Deputy (Party)	Deputy (Party)	Deputy (Party)	Deputy (Party)	Deputy (Party)	Deputy (Party)	Deputy (Party)	Deputy (Party)
2nd	1921	Liam Mellows (SF)	Bryan Cusack (SF)	Frank Fahy (SF)	Joseph Whelehan (SF)	Pádraic Ó Máille (SF)	George Nicolls (SF)	Patrick Hogan (SF)	7 seats 1921–1923	
3rd	1922	Thomas O'Connell (Lab)	Bryan Cusack (AT-SF)	Frank Fahy (AT-SF)	Joseph Whelehan (PT-SF)	Pádraic Ó Máille (PT-SF)	George Nicolls (PT-SF)	Patrick Hogan (PT-SF)	7 seats 1921–1923	
4th	1923	Thomas O'Connell (Lab)	Barney Mellows (Rep)	Frank Fahy (Rep)	Louis O'Dea (Rep)	Pádraic Ó Máille (CnaG)	George Nicolls (CnaG)	Patrick Hogan (CnaG)	Seán Broderick (CnaG)	James Cosgrave (Ind.)
5th	1927 (Jun)	Gilbert Lynch (Lab)	Thomas Powell (FF)	Frank Fahy (Note: Frank Fahy served as Ceann Comhairle from 9 March 1932.) (FF)	Seán Tubridy (FF)	Mark Killilea Snr (FF)	Martin McDonogh (CnaG)	Patrick Hogan (CnaG)	Seán Broderick (CnaG)	William Duffy (NL)
6th	1927 (Sep)	Stephen Jordan (FF)	Thomas Powell (FF)	Frank Fahy (FF)	Seán Tubridy (FF)	Mark Killilea Snr (FF)	Martin McDonogh (CnaG)	Patrick Hogan (CnaG)	Seán Broderick (CnaG)	Joseph Mongan (CnaG)
7th	1932	Stephen Jordan (FF)	Thomas Powell (FF)	Frank Fahy (FF)	Patrick Beegan (FF)	Gerald Bartley (FF)	Fred McDonogh (CnaG)	Patrick Hogan (CnaG)	Seán Broderick (CnaG)	Joseph Mongan (CnaG)
8th	1933	Stephen Jordan (FF)	Mark Killilea Snr (FF)	Frank Fahy (FF)	Patrick Beegan (FF)	Gerald Bartley (FF)	Séamus Keely (FF)	Patrick Hogan (CnaG)	Seán Broderick (CnaG)	Martin McDonogh (CnaG)
8th	1935 by-election	Stephen Jordan (FF)	Mark Killilea Snr (FF)	Frank Fahy (FF)	Patrick Beegan (FF)	Gerald Bartley (FF)	Séamus Keely (FF)	Patrick Hogan (CnaG)	Seán Broderick (CnaG)	Eamon Corbett (FF)
8th	1936 by-election	Stephen Jordan (FF)	Mark Killilea Snr (FF)	Frank Fahy (FF)	Patrick Beegan (FF)	Gerald Bartley (FF)	Séamus Keely (FF)	Martin Neilan (FF)	Seán Broderick (CnaG)	Eamon Corbett (FF)
9th	1937	Constituency abolished. See Galway East and Galway West								

Dáil	Election	Deputy (Party)	Deputy (Party)	Deputy (Party)	Deputy (Party)
9th	1937	Frank Fahy (FF)	Mark Killilea Snr (FF)	Patrick Beegan (FF)	Seán Broderick (FG)
10th	1938	Frank Fahy (FF)	Mark Killilea Snr (FF)	Patrick Beegan (FF)	Seán Broderick (FG)
11th	1943	Frank Fahy (FF)	Mark Killilea Snr (FF)	Patrick Beegan (FF)	Michael Donnellan (CnaT)
12th	1944	Frank Fahy (FF)	Mark Killilea Snr (FF)	Patrick Beegan (FF)	Michael Donnellan (CnaT)
13th	1948	Constituency abolished. See Galway North and Galway South			

Dáil	Election	Deputy (Party)	Deputy (Party)	Deputy (Party)	Deputy (Party)	Deputy (Party)
17th	1961	Michael F. Kitt (FF)	Anthony Millar (FF)	Michael Carty (FF)	Michael Donnellan (CnaT)	Brigid Hogan-O'Higgins (FG)
17th	1964 by-election	Michael F. Kitt (FF)	Anthony Millar (FF)	Michael Carty (FF)	John Donnellan (FG)	Brigid Hogan-O'Higgins (FG)
18th	1965	Michael F. Kitt (FF)	Anthony Millar (FF)	Michael Carty (FF)	John Donnellan (FG)	Brigid Hogan-O'Higgins (FG)
19th	1969	Constituency abolished. See Galway North-East and Clare–South Galway				

Dáil	Election	Deputy (Party)	Deputy (Party)	Deputy (Party)	Deputy (Party)
21st	1977	Johnny Callanan (FF)	Thomas Hussey (FF)	Mark Killilea Jnr (FF)	John Donnellan (FG)
22nd	1981	Johnny Callanan (FF)	Michael P. Kitt (FF)	Paul Connaughton Snr (FG)	3 seats 1981–1997
23rd	1982 (Feb)	Johnny Callanan (FF)	Michael P. Kitt (FF)	Paul Connaughton Snr (FG)	3 seats 1981–1997
23rd	1982 by-election	Noel Treacy (FF)	Michael P. Kitt (FF)	Paul Connaughton Snr (FG)	3 seats 1981–1997
24th	1982 (Nov)	Noel Treacy (FF)	Michael P. Kitt (FF)	Paul Connaughton Snr (FG)	3 seats 1981–1997
25th	1987	Noel Treacy (FF)	Michael P. Kitt (FF)	Paul Connaughton Snr (FG)	3 seats 1981–1997
26th	1989	Noel Treacy (FF)	Michael P. Kitt (FF)	Paul Connaughton Snr (FG)	3 seats 1981–1997
27th	1992	Noel Treacy (FF)	Michael P. Kitt (FF)	Paul Connaughton Snr (FG)	3 seats 1981–1997
28th	1997	Noel Treacy (FF)	Michael P. Kitt (FF)	Paul Connaughton Snr (FG)	Ulick Burke (FG)
29th	2002	Noel Treacy (FF)	Joe Callanan (FF)	Paul Connaughton Snr (FG)	Paddy McHugh (Ind.)
30th	2007	Noel Treacy (FF)	Michael P. Kitt (FF)	Paul Connaughton Snr (FG)	Ulick Burke (FG)
31st	2011	Colm Keaveney (Lab)	Michael P. Kitt (FF)	Ciarán Cannon (FG)	Paul Connaughton Jnr (FG)
32nd	2016	Seán Canney (Ind.)	Anne Rabbitte (FF)	Ciarán Cannon (FG)	3 seats 2016–2024
33rd	2020	Seán Canney (Ind.)	Anne Rabbitte (FF)	Ciarán Cannon (FG)	3 seats 2016–2024
34th	2024	Seán Canney (Ind.)	Albert Dolan (FF)	Peter Roche (FG)	Louis O'Hara (SF)

Dáil	Election	Deputy (Party)	Deputy (Party)	Deputy (Party)
13th	1948	Frank Fahy (Note: As Ceann Comhairle, Frank Fahy was returned automatically in each of the two elections held in Galway South in 1948 and 1951. He rejoined the Fianna Fáil parliamentary party in 1951.) (FF)	Patrick Beegan (FF)	Robert Lahiffe (FF)
14th	1951	Frank Fahy (FF)	Patrick Beegan (FF)	Patrick Cawley (FG)
14th	1953 by-election	Robert Lahiffe (FF)	Patrick Beegan (FF)	Patrick Cawley (FG)
15th	1954	Robert Lahiffe (FF)	Patrick Beegan (FF)	Brendan Glynn (FG)
16th	1957	Michael Carty (FF)	Patrick Beegan (FF)	Brigid Hogan-O'Higgins (FG)
16th	1958 by-election	Michael Carty (FF)	Anthony Millar (FF)	Brigid Hogan-O'Higgins (FG)
17th	1961	Constituency abolished. See Galway East and Galway West		
