= Declan Costello =

Irish judge, barrister and politician (1926–2011)

President of the High Court
- In office 1 August 1995 – 12 October 1998
- Nominated by: Government of Ireland
- Appointed by: Mary Robinson
- Preceded by: Harry Whelehan
- Succeeded by: Frederick Morris

Judge of the High Court
- In office 1 June 1977 – 3 September 1998
- Nominated by: Government of Ireland
- Appointed by: Patrick Hillery

Attorney General of Ireland
- In office 15 March 1973 – 19 May 1977
- Taoiseach: Liam Cosgrave
- Preceded by: Colm Condon
- Succeeded by: John M. Kelly

Teachta Dála
- In office February 1973 – May 1977
- Constituency: Dublin South-West
- In office May 1951 – June 1969
- Constituency: Dublin North-West

Personal details
- Born: David Declan Costello; 1 August 1926 Ballsbridge, Dublin, Ireland
- Died: 6 June 2011 (aged 84) Beaumont Medical Clinic, Dublin, Ireland
- Resting place: Shanganagh Cemetery, Shankill, Dublin, Ireland
- Party: Fine Gael
- Spouse: Joan Fitzsimons (m. 1954)
- Children: 6, including Caroline
- Parents: John A. Costello (father); Ida Mary O'Malley (mother)
- Education: University College Dublin; King's Inn

Declan Costello (1 August 1926 – 6 June 2011) was an Irish judge, barrister and Fine Gael politician who served as President of the High Court from 1995 to 1998, a Judge of the High Court from 1977 to 1998 and Attorney General of Ireland from 1973 to 1977. He also served as a Teachta Dála (TD) for the Dublin North-West constituency from 1951 to 1969 and for the Dublin South-West constituency from 1973 to 1977.

The formulator of the Towards a Just Society policy document, Costello was credited with shifting Fine Gael towards the left, a move which made the party a more attractive coalition partner for the Labour Party. Costello's ideals were later viewed as having been taken up by Garret FitzGerald, who became leader of Fine Gael and was twice Taoiseach. As Attorney General, Costello created the Office of the Director of Public Prosecutions and the Law Reform Commission, and for this Costello has been called the "most consequential attorney general in the state's history".

== Background ==
David Declan Costello was born and grew up in Ballsbridge, Dublin, the son of John A. Costello who served as Taoiseach on two occasions, and Ida Mary Costello (née O'Malley). He attended the Sacred Heart convent school, Leeson Street, and St Xavier's School, Donnybrook. He was educated at University College Dublin (UCD), where he studied Law and Economics from 1943, and was an auditor of the UCD Law Society. In 1944, he entered King's Inn on a scholarship. During his time at UCD, he won several medals for debating in the Law Society and the Literary and Historical Society. His time as a student was interrupted in 1946 due to a bout of tuberculosis of the kidney which forced him to spend 10 months in a health clinic in Switzerland. He survived the disease but at the cost of one of his kidneys, which would leave him in relative frail health and appearance for the rest of his life. Due to a relapse of his condition in 1947 that forced him to once again return to Switzerland, he missed his father's ascent to the office of Taoiseach in February 1948.

In 1948, Costello completed his degree, joined the Irish Bar and began practising law in and around Dublin.

== Political career ==
=== Becoming a TD and early social influences ===
There [in Dublin North West] you saw the reality of life, the reality of Dublin, the reality of Irish life. There was terrific poverty in Ireland. Small [homes], three bedrooms, with 19 people living in them."

— Declan Costello, recalling his experiences in his first constituency of Dublin North West,

Having a family connection to the party, Costello had been a member of Fine Gael since joining college. In 1951, at the age of just 24, he was elected to Dáil Éireann as a Fine Gael TD for the Dublin North-West constituency during that year's general election. He was the youngest member of the house at the time, earning him the informal title of Baby of the Dáil. The following years would significantly influence Costello's political views; his exposure to the poor living conditions of his constituents in Dublin North-west radically altered his views on housing. In 1953, Costello married Joan Fitzsimons. With Joan, Costello would go on to have four sons and two daughters. One of these sons was later found to have autism, and the cause of children with special needs quickly became an area of special concern for Costello, particularly as "his elder brother Wilfrid had been left with a mild mental disability during birth". Costello co-founded the Association of Parents and Friends of Mentally Handicapped Children (renamed St Michael's House in later years) in 1955, and aided in the fund-raising for a daycare centre in 1956 for the education of children who were mentally disabled. The fundraising would lead to the daycare centre becoming known as an official school in 1960. Beginning in 1956 until he died in 2011, Costello was the St Michael's House president, making him ultimately responsible for 170 centres across the Dublin region.

=== Stepping out of his father's shadow ===
After the 1954 general election, John A. Costello became Taoiseach for a second time, while Declan retained his seat. Although Declan was not placed in a cabinet position, he had a measure of influence over his father and the government. Considered the most radical of those who advised his father, Declan pushed against the austerity measures of Finance Minister Gerard Sweetman, who in time would become a great rival and adversary. Following the 1957 Irish general election, in which Fine Gael and its coalition partners lost control of the government to Fianna Fáil, Costello became Fine Gael's spokesperson on foreign affairs. In this capacity, Costello asserted liberal, anti-communist views while encouraging European integration amongst the growing European Economic Community organisation. Two issues, in particular, drew his attention: the government's support for the withdrawal of Russian and US forces from Europe, and the support is given for a resolution favouring the inclusion of People's Republic of China as part of the UN.

It was also at this time that he began to advocate that Fine Gael move politically leftward to broaden its image beyond that of simply being a status quo, bourgeois party, as well as to make it a more attractive coalition partner to the Labour Party. Towards the end of the 1950s, Costello began to assert himself even more in Fine Gael; alongside a growing collection of progressives within the party, Costello founded a monthly political magazine as well as a research and study group focused on developing new policies for the party. However, to their disappointment, Costello and his faction found the rest of Fine Gael slow and sluggish in response to their new ideas and thought that they were against the complex making of policies and the voicing of personal differences in public. Following his father's retirement from politics in 1959, longstanding member James Dillon became leader of the party and Costello felt his ability to influence policy-making slipping away.

=== The Just Society ===
In 1963, Costello found an attempt to change party policy suppressed by the party leadership. Regardless, in April 1964 Costello broke party protocols and circulated a proposal to radically alter Fine Gael's economic policies. At this point Costello did not expect his proposal to gain traction within the party; instead, it was to be used as a pretext to leave the party and politics, and to turn to his work as a lawyer. Costello neither canvassed other party members nor spoke to the press following the circulation of his document. However, to his surprise, Costello's ideas began to pick up momentum with Fine Gael backbenchers, who had begun to crave a means by which Fine Gael could differentiate itself from Fianna Fáil. Journalists too began to take an interest in the initiative, sensing a new direction emerging in Irish politics.

Costello began to argue his case with the Fine Gael frontbench, and using his honed debating skills, dominated proceedings. Unable to outright repudiate Costello's ideas, the frontbench sought to bog down discussions and drag them out. However, in March 1965 the party was shocked by the development that Fianna Fáil were seeking to hold a general election. With no time to develop a separate manifesto other than what Costello was proposing, his ideas were given the green light. He would go on to expand his initial policy document into a 30,000-word manifesto called Towards a Just Society, which would have a major impact on the party for many decades.

Towards a Just Society called for a radical shift in the Irish economy to something closer to a social democratic mixed economy; it called for production objectives in the private sector, earnings and credit from banks to be controlled, no discrimination of women's wages, industrial school reformation, lower use of indirect taxes, free near-universal health care with the decision of what doctor to have and an educational system that permits moving to university despite being wealthy or not. Although radical, because of its length Towards a Just Society was difficult to communicate to the Irish public in the short time the party had to campaign in the 1965 Irish general election. Fine Gael did not make gains in the elections, and afterwards, Labour were rattled by the move, and in response, they also moved more to the left. However, the Just Society's critique of public services in Ireland forced Fianna Fáil to alter its policies, and during the election, they made promises regarding housing, health and welfare. Costello's political profile was enhanced by the Just Society concept.

=== After the 1965 election ===
Costello continued his work as a TD for Dublin North-West and came to seek the leadership of Fine Gael to continue his Just Society project. His opportunity came quickly, as following the 1965 election James Dillon stepped down as leader of the party. However, Costello was politically outmanoeuvred by Dillon and Sweetman who moved rapidly to place Liam Cosgrave as Dillon's successor and were successful. In the aftermath, a dejected Costello sought to become the party's spokesperson for Finance, but instead was handed the position of spokesperson for health and social welfare. Costello was further frustrated by Cosgrave's limp espousal of the Just Society concept.

Post-1965, Costello's health once again began to haunt him, and his position as de facto leader of Fine Gael's progressive faction increasingly fell to a young Garret FitzGerald, whom Costello himself had brought into the party. Like Costello, Fitzgerald was the son of a stalwart of the party, being the son of Desmond Fitzgerald, and like Costello Fitzgerald shook off the traditional conservatism of his father to embrace a more social liberal outlook. In February 1967, Costello said that he would not aim for the Dáil again and focused on his successful legal work. Michael O'Leary of Labour lamented that Irish politics would be losing a "young man of great courage and idealism". Fine Gael backbencher John Healy wrote "He has been lost to Fine Gael almost from the day Mr Liam Cosgrave took over, reshuffled his deck and left Declan Costello on the fringe of things. Declan Costello deserved better: he did not get it".

In 1968/1969, Costello successfully defended Sean Bourke against extradition to the United Kingdom about his assisting George Blake, the Soviet double agent, to escape from prison. In 1972 Costello unsuccessfully defended journalist Kevin O'Kelly against contempt of court charges, arising from a radio interview he conducted with Provisional IRA leader Seán Mac Stiofáin. O'Kelly was sentenced to three months in prison.

Although outside the confines of Fine Gael, Costello continued to remain in the political sphere. He would host parties and meetings of Fine Gael and Labour members, where they would discuss possible Fine Gael/Labour coalitions, how to dislodge Cosgrave as leader of Fine Gael and even the possibility of forming a new political party. When the prospects of an actual Fine Gael/Labour coalition became more and more tangible from 1970 onwards, Costello announced he would stand for the Dáil in the next election. He stood in a different constituency from his previous one, moving to Dublin South-West, but was elected at the 1973 Irish general election. The inclusion of a progressive such as Costello on the Fine Gael ticket helped cement the Fine Gael/Labour coalition.

=== Attorney General of Ireland ===
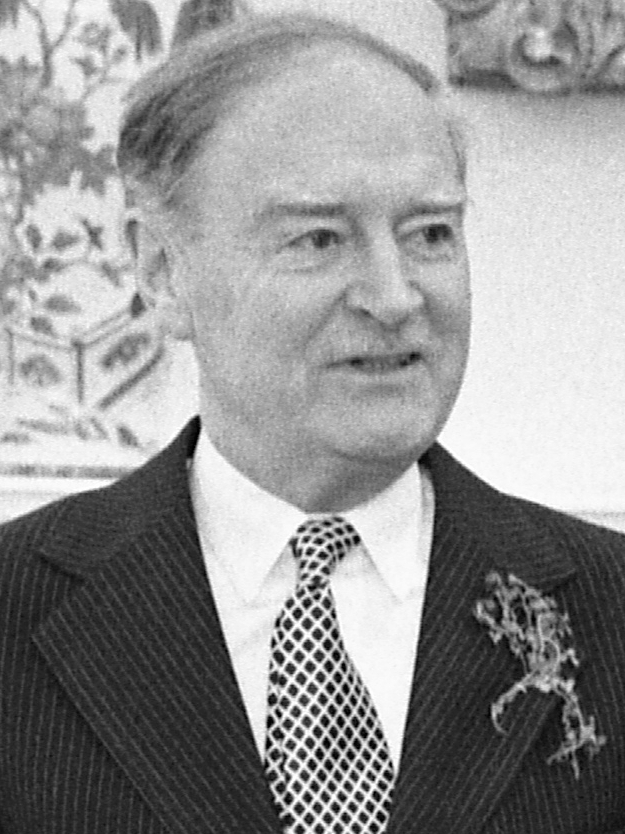
Costello served in the cabinet of Liam Cosgrave as Attorney General of Ireland

When Fine Gael returned to government in 1973, Costello was appointed Attorney General under Taoiseach Liam Cosgrave. By focusing on his successes in the legal profession, Cosgrave was able to prevent Costello from holding a ministry without dismissing him out of hand. Regardless, Costello accepted the position, even though it meant he would earn less money than if he continued his private law practice. As per the custom in Ireland, Costello as Attorney General rarely spoke in the Dáil. However, he was influential amongst the cabinet, where his views were held in high regard by the minister for foreign affairs Garret FitzGerald, and members of Labour, such as Justin Keating who was the minister for industry and commerce.

As attorney general, Costello took part in the negotiations for the Sunningdale Agreement. Costello took his cues from John Hume, the leader of the Social Democratic and Labour Party, the main nationalist party in Northern Ireland at the time, and like Hume was successful in pushing for very capable all-Ireland establishments. When the agreement was challenged as unconstitutional, it was Costello's role to defend it. He did so successfully in the courts, but his ultra-aggressive defence of it contributed to the disdain in which Unionists held it, and in turn, they would cause the collapse of the agreement in early 1974.

Costello pushed, unsuccessfully, for family law in Ireland to be updated so that it would be more sympathetic to forsaken wives, mothers who were not married, and out-of-wedlock-born children, as well as other more liberal values. In 1974, he also was the main person to promote a bill that would have liberalised the purchase of contraceptives in Ireland by allowing married couples to access them without barriers. However, the bill failed when six members of Fine Gael, including most prominently of all Taoiseach Liam Cosgrave, voted against it.

As Attorney General, Costello refused requests by members of the coalition to have their constituents' minor criminal charges squashed, an established practice in Ireland. Costello sought to depoliticise the office of Attorney General and successfully did so in 1975 upon his establishment of the Director of Public Prosecutions's office. From then on, briefs for criminal cases would be apportioned despite the party relationship. Finding many of his attempts to reform Irish law stifled by a combination of bureaucratic lethargy and defiance from vested interests, Costello founded the Law Reform Commission in 1975. Although the Law Reform Commission lacked resources or political support, in time it was able to produce significant legal reform in Ireland thanks to its institutional status.

During his time as Attorney General, Costello proved to be a thorn in the side of the British government. Costello was vocal in his belief that, wherever possible, the Irish state should refuse to extradite Provisional Irish Republican Army prisoners to the United Kingdom. Costello's stance was born out of his experience in 1973 when he was in charge of Ireland's case with the European Commission of Human Rights being against the UK for the internment and torture of nationalists in Northern Ireland. Costello had been convinced he needed to establish precedent in international law on the matter, regardless of diplomatic concerns. Engaging the political right and tabloid press in the UK, Costello was able to prove in court that the British state was illegally using sensory deprivation techniques on prisoners. In 1977, it was decided by the court that the prisoners were treated harmfully before giving the verdict of the UK being cleared of torture.

For having created the Office of the Director of Public Prosecutions and the Law Reform Commission, Costello has been called the "most consequential attorney general in the state's history".

== Judicial career ==
Although the Fine Gael–Labour coalition had expanded social investment and broadened the tax base in Ireland, its more ambitious plans were halted by the 1973 oil crisis as well as by the deepening of the Troubles in Northern Ireland. A by-election in Dublin South-West in 1976 signalled that his seat was in danger, and Costello responded he would not try to be re-elected. In May 1977, he resigned as attorney general and as a TD and was appointed as a judge of the high court.

As a judge, Costello was described as "stern, meticulous and industrious". He specialised in equity. In response to growing paramilitarism, Costello developed "sophisticated asset-freezing orders and search warrants". One tendency for which Costello was noted, was for early case decisions as to the rights and wrongs of each party's intentions, and encouraging the applicable barrister to make a satisfactory legal argument. Costello did not care much for precedent; instead, he favoured "creative use of technicalities" and his decisions were considered all but appeal-proof. Several Costello's decisions on intellectual property were cited internationally.

Following the Whiddy Island disaster in 1979, in which 50 people lost their lives in an oil tanker explosion, Costello was appointed to lead a tribunal of inquiry to investigate the matter. His report on the incident was highly critical of the two international companies responsible for handling the tanker (TotalEnergies and Gulf Oil), but also of a terminal controller on-site as well as the Irish authorities for failing to supervise safety practices. Costello was subsequently praised for his speedy but thorough handling of the investigation.

After the Widdy Island investigation, Costello was appointed chairman of two committees: one created for the development of a national youth policy, and the other to guide the charity sector's governance; both produced comprehensive reports but their findings were effectively ignored. In 1985 Costello upheld the firing of Eileen Flynn, an unmarried woman who had given birth to a child while working as a teacher at a Catholic-run school. He ultimately supported the nuns who ran the school and their contention that Flynn's "conduct was capable of damaging" their efforts to uphold Catholic "norms of behaviour".

Costello's decisions as a judge were informed by his belief "that the Irish constitution was best understood in the light of its Christian preamble and of passages acknowledging an ethical order superior to formal law." Based on this interpretation, Costello believed that "Irish judges could override laws that contravened the classical Christian iteration of natural law as formulated by St Thomas Aquinas, which stressed morality and economic justice." Conversely, Costello advised Irish judges to practice utmost restraint in actually exercising these powers.

In 1989, Costello ruled on matters involving "the limits of judicial authority". In O'Reilly v. Limerick Corporation (1989), Costello ruled that the courts could not adjudicate over the state's distribution of public resources, as this required specialist knowledge. In 1993, Costello ruled "that the Office of Public Works was not exempt from the planning process". In 1995, Costello ruled that a "withholding tax" was unconstitutional, a decision which was said to have cost the state around £60 million.

=== The X Case ===
In February 1992, the Attorney General, Harry Whelehan, sought an injunction from the High Court to restrain a 14-year-old girl, known as "X", who was a victim of statutory rape, from travelling outside the State to obtain an abortion. The case came before Costello, who was forced to weigh the argument that there was a high probability of "X" committing suicide unless she were permitted to travel against the "right to life of the unborn" contained in the constitution following the Eighth Amendment in 1983. Costello held "that the certainty of the fetus dying in an abortion outweighed the possibility of a suicide", and granted the injunction. The response was explosive; there was international condemnation of the decision. On 26 February the Supreme Court overturned Costello's ruling. Costello's ruling was opined to be in breach of European law, which "protects the right to travel for services lawfully provided" in other EU countries, although an official ruling on that thinking was avoided. In November 1992, a constitutional amendment to permit travel was approved in a referendum.

=== President of the High Court ===
Although his decision in the X Case had shocked Costello's liberal admirers, his appointment as President of the High Court in 1995 was not judged to be controversial, partly because he had been acting president since 1991. As president, Costello created procedures which allowed "urgent cases to be dealt with faster" before retiring as a judge in December 1997. Costello's final act as a public figure was "to head an inquiry into the tax evasion conspiracy directed by the Guinness and Mahon Bank". Having taken the position in 1999, he retired from it in 2000 upon medical advice.

== Political influences ==
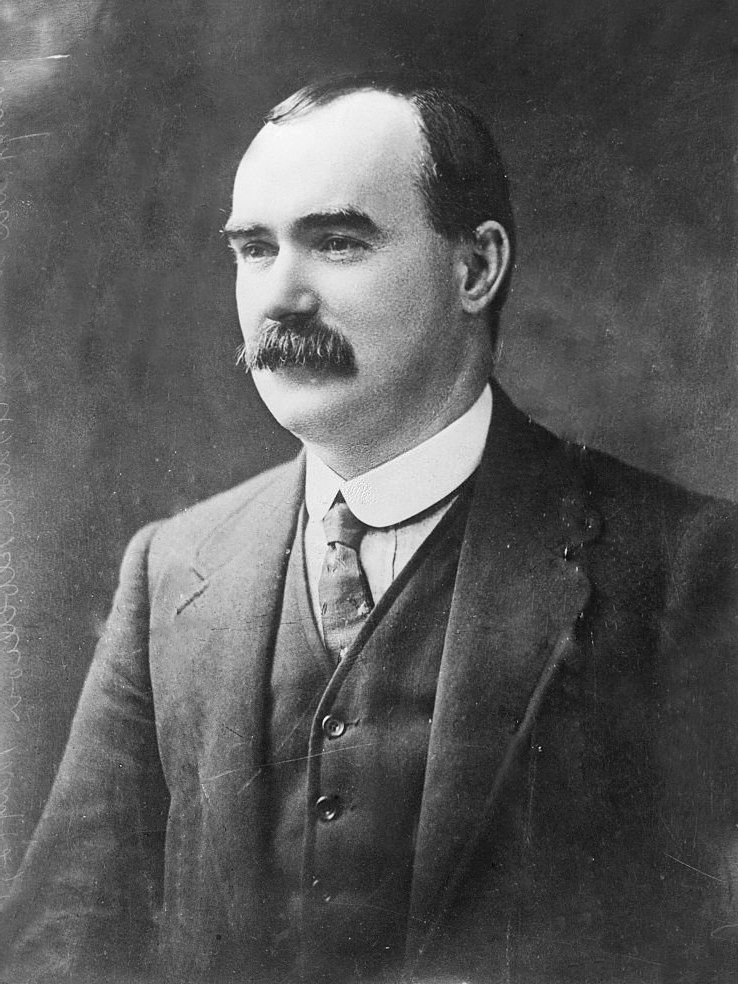
James Connolly

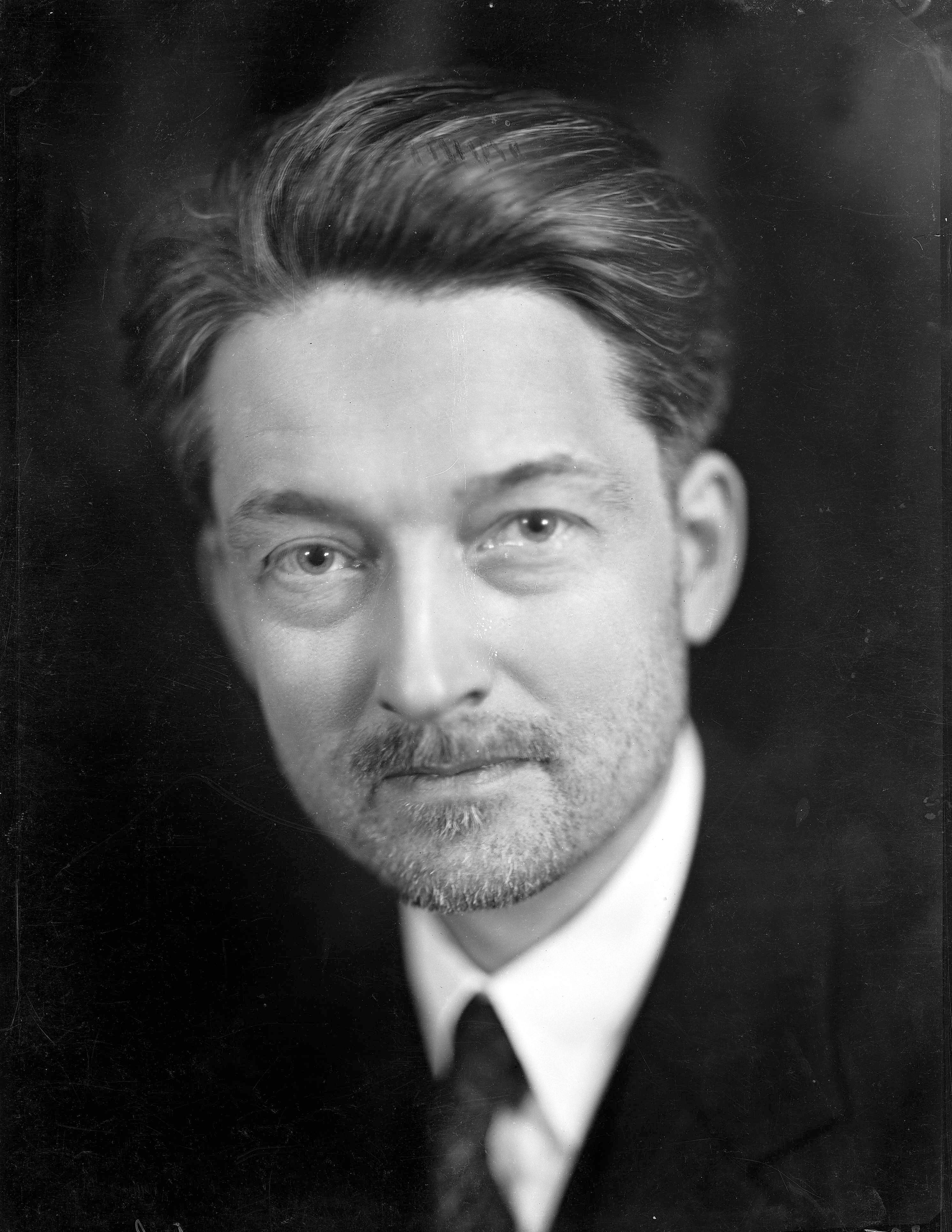
Jacques Maritain

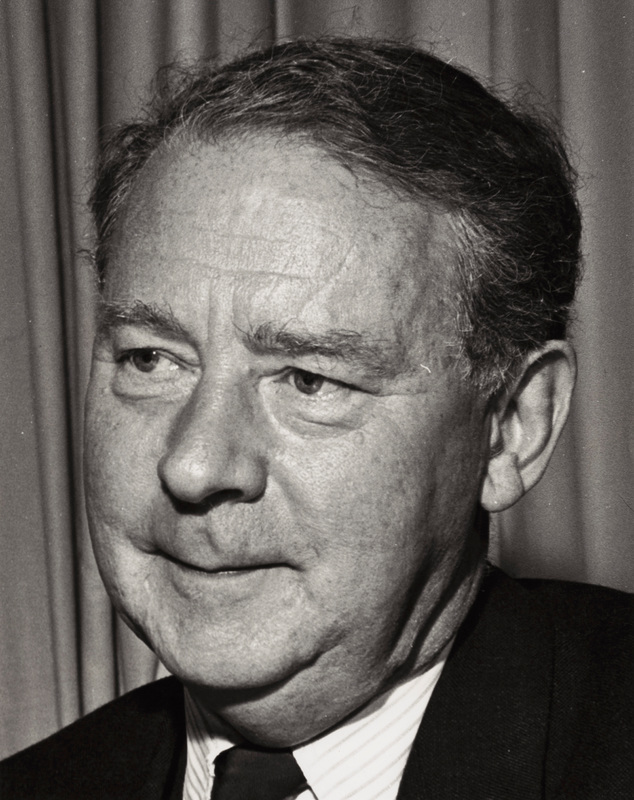
Hugh Gaitskell

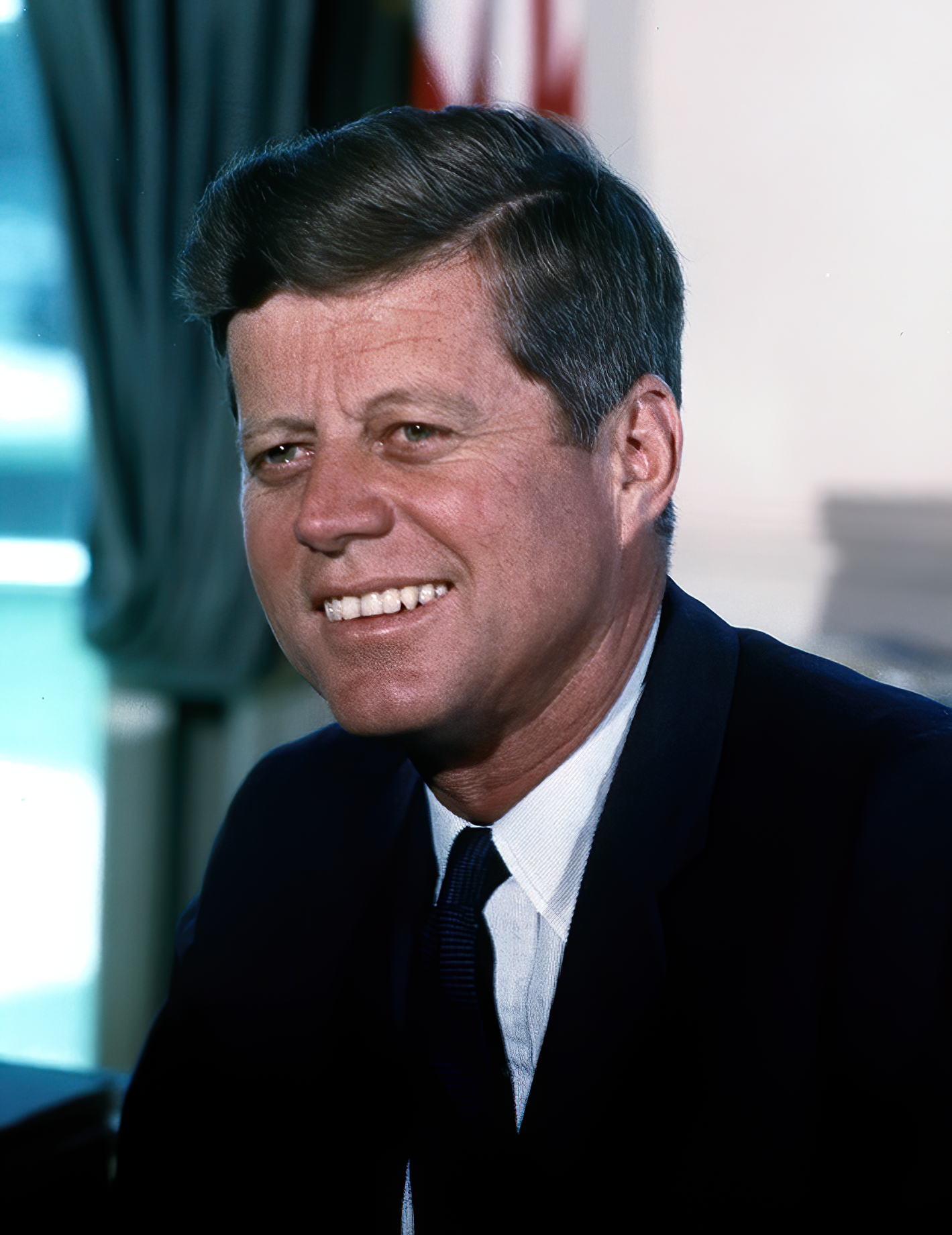
John F. Kennedy

Costello claimed a diverse array of political influences from across the political spectrum

Costello has been described as a "devotee" of the Catholic philosopher Jacques Maritain, a believer that "human rights existed to serve the common good rather than individual autonomy". Costello himself cited British Labour Party leader Hugh Gaitskell, Irish socialist James Connolly, Irish Minister for Justice Kevin O'Higgins and US President John F. Kennedy as political influences and leaders whom he admired. Researcher Ciara Meehan has suggested that the influence of Pope John XXIII's Mater et magistra in 1961 was a clear influence upon the Just Society document.

== Personal life ==
In 1950, Jacqueline Bouvier, later to become better known as Jackie Kennedy, was staying for a time in Ireland. She had befriended Father Joseph Leonard, an elderly priest who lived in Drumcondra, Dublin. It was through Father Leonard that Bouvier was introduced to the Costello family. Bouvier had confessed to Father Leonard that she was seeking a husband at the time, and Leonard suggested that Declan, then 24 years old, would be a good match. Bouvier wrote to Leonard that Declan "sounds like absolute heaven" and that he would make a "suitable" husband. However, the match was never to come about as Bouvier continued her travels onwards to Scotland, and later returned to the United States while Costello married Joan Fitzsimons in 1953. Jacqueline would return to Ireland in 1955 as Mrs. Jacqueline Kennedy alongside her new husband US Senator (and future US president) John F. Kennedy, whom she introduced to the Costello family. Jacqueline would later write in a private letter to Costello recalling a double date between the couples: "That night we dined at Jammet's and our happy marriage was nearly rent asunder because Jack was enchanted by Joan and I was enchanted with you — but somehow we patched it all up at the movies"

Costello and his wife Joan had six children together, including Caroline Costello who followed in his footsteps and also became a Judge.

Costello died on 6 June 2011 in Rathfarnham, Dublin following a long illness.

== Legacy ==
The impact of Declan Costello's Just Society continued to be felt decades after it was published. The Just Society had been called "a milestone" in the Fine Gael's history and remains frequently referenced. During the 1980s, Garret FitzGerald as Taoiseach was considered to be the champion of the Just Society concept. During the 2017 Fine Gael leadership election between Leo Varadkar and Simon Coveney, Coveney put forward that he would bring the party back in line with the concepts stipulated in the Just Society document. It was also during that 2017 leadership contest that leading member of Fine Gael, Paschal Donohoe, published an opinion piece in The Irish Times in which he heavily praised the Just Society document and called for it to once again become a centrepiece of Fine Gael's policies.

== See also ==
- Families in the Oireachtas

Honorary titles
Preceded by William J. Murphy	Baby of the Dáil; 1951–1956	Succeeded by Kathleen O'Connor
Legal offices
Preceded by Colm Condon	Attorney General of Ireland; 1973–1977	Succeeded by John Kelly
Preceded by Harry Whelehan	President of the High Court; 1995–1998	Succeeded by Frederick Morris

Dáil	Election	Deputy (Party)	Deputy (Party)	Deputy (Party)	Deputy (Party)
2nd	1921	Philip Cosgrave (SF)	Joseph McGrath (SF)	Richard Mulcahy (SF)	Michael Staines (SF)
3rd	1922	Philip Cosgrave (PT-SF)	Joseph McGrath (PT-SF)	Richard Mulcahy (PT-SF)	Michael Staines (PT-SF)
4th	1923	Constituency abolished. See Dublin North			

Dáil	Election	Deputy (Party)	Deputy (Party)	Deputy (Party)	Deputy (Party)	Deputy (Party)
9th	1937	Seán T. O'Kelly (FF)	A. P. Byrne (Ind.)	Cormac Breathnach (FF)	Patrick McGilligan (FG)	Archie Heron (Lab)
10th	1938	Seán T. O'Kelly (FF)	A. P. Byrne (Ind.)	Cormac Breathnach (FF)	Patrick McGilligan (FG)	Eamonn Cooney (FF)
11th	1943	Seán T. O'Kelly (FF)	A. P. Byrne (Ind.)	Cormac Breathnach (FF)	Patrick McGilligan (FG)	Martin O'Sullivan (Lab)
12th	1944	Seán T. O'Kelly (FF)	John S. O'Connor (FF)	Cormac Breathnach (FF)	Patrick McGilligan (FG)	Martin O'Sullivan (Lab)
12th	1945 by-election	Vivion de Valera (FF)	John S. O'Connor (FF)	Cormac Breathnach (FF)	Patrick McGilligan (FG)	Martin O'Sullivan (Lab)
13th	1948	Mick Fitzpatrick (CnaP)	A. P. Byrne (Ind.)	Cormac Breathnach (FF)	3 seats from 1948 to 1969	
14th	1951	Declan Costello (FG)	A. P. Byrne (Ind.)	Cormac Breathnach (FF)	3 seats from 1948 to 1969	
14th	1952 by-election	Declan Costello (FG)	Thomas Byrne (Ind.)	Cormac Breathnach (FF)	3 seats from 1948 to 1969	
15th	1954	Declan Costello (FG)	Thomas Byrne (Ind.)	Richard Gogan (FF)	3 seats from 1948 to 1969	
16th	1957	Declan Costello (FG)	Thomas Byrne (Ind.)	Richard Gogan (FF)	3 seats from 1948 to 1969	
17th	1961	Declan Costello (FG)	Michael Mullen (Lab)	Richard Gogan (FF)	3 seats from 1948 to 1969	
18th	1965	Declan Costello (FG)	Michael Mullen (Lab)	Richard Gogan (FF)	3 seats from 1948 to 1969	
19th	1969	Hugh Byrne (FG)	Jim Tunney (FF)	Richard Gogan (FF)	David Thornley (Lab)	4 seats from 1969 to 1977
20th	1973	Hugh Byrne (FG)	Jim Tunney (FF)	Richard Gogan (FF)	David Thornley (Lab)	4 seats from 1969 to 1977
21st	1977	Constituency abolished. See Dublin Finglas and Dublin Cabra				

Dáil	Election	Deputy (Party)	Deputy (Party)	Deputy (Party)	Deputy (Party)
22nd	1981	Jim Tunney (FF)	Michael Barrett (FF)	Mary Flaherty (FG)	Hugh Byrne (FG)
23rd	1982 (Feb)	Jim Tunney (FF)	Michael Barrett (FF)	Mary Flaherty (FG)	Proinsias De Rossa (WP)
24th	1982 (Nov)	Jim Tunney (FF)	Michael Barrett (FF)	Mary Flaherty (FG)	Proinsias De Rossa (WP)
25th	1987	Jim Tunney (FF)	Michael Barrett (FF)	Mary Flaherty (FG)	Proinsias De Rossa (WP)
26th	1989	Jim Tunney (FF)	Michael Barrett (FF)	Mary Flaherty (FG)	Proinsias De Rossa (WP)
27th	1992	Noel Ahern (FF)	Róisín Shortall (Lab)	Mary Flaherty (FG)	Proinsias De Rossa (DL)
28th	1997	Noel Ahern (FF)	Róisín Shortall (Lab)	Pat Carey (FF)	Proinsias De Rossa (DL)
29th	2002	Noel Ahern (FF)	Róisín Shortall (Lab)	Pat Carey (FF)	3 seats from 2002
30th	2007	Noel Ahern (FF)	Róisín Shortall (Lab)	Pat Carey (FF)	3 seats from 2002
31st	2011	Dessie Ellis (SF)	Róisín Shortall (Lab)	John Lyons (Lab)	3 seats from 2002
32nd	2016	Dessie Ellis (SF)	Róisín Shortall (SD)	Noel Rock (FG)	3 seats from 2002
33rd	2020	Dessie Ellis (SF)	Róisín Shortall (SD)	Paul McAuliffe (FF)	3 seats from 2002
34th	2024	Dessie Ellis (SF)	Rory Hearne (SD)	Paul McAuliffe (FF)	3 seats from 2002

Dáil	Election	Deputy (Party)	Deputy (Party)	Deputy (Party)	Deputy (Party)	Deputy (Party)
13th	1948	Seán MacBride (CnaP)	Peadar Doyle (FG)	Bernard Butler (FF)	Michael O'Higgins (FG)	Robert Briscoe (FF)
14th	1951	Seán MacBride (CnaP)	Peadar Doyle (FG)	Bernard Butler (FF)	Michael ffrench-O'Carroll (Ind.)	Robert Briscoe (FF)
15th	1954	Seán MacBride (CnaP)	Peadar Doyle (FG)	Bernard Butler (FF)	Michael O'Higgins (FG)	Robert Briscoe (FF)
15th	1956 by-election	Seán MacBride (CnaP)	Noel Lemass (FF)	Bernard Butler (FF)	Michael O'Higgins (FG)	Robert Briscoe (FF)
16th	1957	James Carroll (Ind.)	Noel Lemass (FF)	Bernard Butler (FF)	Michael O'Higgins (FG)	Robert Briscoe (FF)
16th	1959 by-election	James Carroll (Ind.)	Noel Lemass (FF)	Richie Ryan (FG)	Michael O'Higgins (FG)	Robert Briscoe (FF)
17th	1961	James Carroll (Ind.)	Noel Lemass (FF)	Richie Ryan (FG)	James O'Keeffe (FG)	Robert Briscoe (FF)
18th	1965	John O'Connell (Lab)	Noel Lemass (FF)	Richie Ryan (FG)	Joseph Dowling (FF)	Ben Briscoe (FF)
19th	1969	John O'Connell (Lab)	Noel Lemass (FF)	Seán Dunne (Lab)	Joseph Dowling (FF)	4 seats 1969–1977
19th	1970 by-election	John O'Connell (Lab)	Noel Lemass (FF)	Seán Sherwin (FF)	Joseph Dowling (FF)	4 seats 1969–1977
20th	1973	John O'Connell (Lab)	Noel Lemass (FF)	Declan Costello (FG)	Joseph Dowling (FF)	4 seats 1969–1977
20th	1976 by-election	John O'Connell (Lab)	Brendan Halligan (Lab)	Declan Costello (FG)	Joseph Dowling (FF)	4 seats 1969–1977
21st	1977	Constituency abolished. See Dublin Ballyfermot				

Dáil	Election	Deputy (Party)	Deputy (Party)	Deputy (Party)	Deputy (Party)	Deputy (Party)
22nd	1981	Seán Walsh (FF)	Larry McMahon (FG)	Mary Harney (FF)	Mervyn Taylor (Lab)	4 seats 1981–1992
23rd	1982 (Feb)	Seán Walsh (FF)	Larry McMahon (FG)	Mary Harney (FF)	Mervyn Taylor (Lab)	4 seats 1981–1992
24th	1982 (Nov)	Seán Walsh (FF)	Michael O'Leary (FG)	Mary Harney (FF)	Mervyn Taylor (Lab)	4 seats 1981–1992
25th	1987	Seán Walsh (FF)	Chris Flood (FF)	Mary Harney (PDs)	Mervyn Taylor (Lab)	4 seats 1981–1992
26th	1989	Pat Rabbitte (WP)	Chris Flood (FF)	Mary Harney (PDs)	Mervyn Taylor (Lab)	4 seats 1981–1992
27th	1992	Pat Rabbitte (DL)	Chris Flood (FF)	Mary Harney (PDs)	Mervyn Taylor (Lab)	Éamonn Walsh (Lab)
28th	1997	Pat Rabbitte (DL)	Chris Flood (FF)	Mary Harney (PDs)	Conor Lenihan (FF)	Brian Hayes (FG)
29th	2002	Pat Rabbitte (Lab)	Charlie O'Connor (FF)	Seán Crowe (SF)	Conor Lenihan (FF)	4 seats 2002–2016
30th	2007	Pat Rabbitte (Lab)	Charlie O'Connor (FF)	Brian Hayes (FG)	Conor Lenihan (FF)	4 seats 2002–2016
31st	2011	Pat Rabbitte (Lab)	Eamonn Maloney (Lab)	Brian Hayes (FG)	Seán Crowe (SF)	4 seats 2002–2016
31st	2014 by-election	Pat Rabbitte (Lab)	Eamonn Maloney (Lab)	Paul Murphy (AAA)	Seán Crowe (SF)	4 seats 2002–2016
32nd	2016	Colm Brophy (FG)	John Lahart (FF)	Paul Murphy (AAA–PBP)	Seán Crowe (SF)	Katherine Zappone (Ind.)
33rd	2020	Colm Brophy (FG)	John Lahart (FF)	Paul Murphy (S–PBP)	Seán Crowe (SF)	Francis Noel Duffy (GP)
34th	2024	Colm Brophy (FG)	John Lahart (FF)	Paul Murphy (PBP–S)	Seán Crowe (SF)	Ciarán Ahern (Lab)
