= South Galway (UK Parliament constituency) =

UK parliamentary constituency in Ireland, 1885–1922

- Former county constituency for the House of Commons

1885–1922
- Seats: 1
- Created from: County Galway
- Replaced by: Galway

South Galway was a UK Parliament constituency in Ireland, returning one Member of Parliament from 1885 to 1922.

Prior to the 1885 general election the area was part of the County Galway constituency. From 1922, on the establishment of the Irish Free State, it was not represented in the UK Parliament.

== Boundaries ==
This constituency comprised the southern part of County Galway. In 1918, the constituency was redrawn to include part of the dissolved Galway Borough constituency and to exclude the district electoral divisions of Drumaan, Inishcaltra North and Mountshannon, transferred to County Clare under the Local Government (Ireland) Act 1898, which were added to the East Clare constituency.

1885–1918: The baronies of Aran, Athenry, Dunkellin, Kiltartan, Leitrim and Loughrea.

1918–1922: The rural district of Gort, that part of the rural district of Galway not included in the Galway Connemara constituency and that part of the rural district of Loughrea not included in the East Galway constituency.

== Members of Parliament ==
Election	Member	Party
1885	David Sheehy	Irish Parliamentary Party
1890	David Sheehy	Irish National Federation
1900	William Duffy	Irish Parliamentary Party
1918	Frank Fahy	Sinn Féin
1921	Constituency merged into Galway (Dáil constituency)	

== Elections ==
=== Elections in the 1880s ===
General election 27 November 1885: Galway South
Party	Candidate	Votes	%	±%
Irish Parliamentary	David Sheehy	Unopposed		
Registered electors		7,220		
Irish Parliamentary win (new seat)				

General election 6 July 1886: Galway South
Party	Candidate	Votes	%	±%
Irish Parliamentary	David Sheehy	Unopposed		
Registered electors		7,220		
Irish Parliamentary hold				

=== Elections in the 1890s ===
General election 13 July 1892: Galway South
Party	Candidate	Votes	%	±%
Irish National Federation	David Sheehy	2,623	65.0	N/A
Irish National League	John P. McCarthy	1,411	35.0	N/A
Majority		1,212	30.0	N/A
Turnout		4,034	60.1	N/A
Registered electors		6,708		
Irish National Federation gain from Irish Parliamentary		Swing	N/A	

General election 19 July 1895: Galway South
Party	Candidate	Votes	%	±%
Irish National Federation	David Sheehy	Unopposed		
Registered electors		7,265		
Irish National Federation hold				

=== Elections in the 1900s ===
General election 5 October 1900: Galway South
Party	Candidate	Votes	%	±%
Irish Parliamentary	William Duffy	Unopposed		
Registered electors		8,148		
Irish Parliamentary hold				

General election 19 January 1906: Galway South
Party	Candidate	Votes	%	±%
Irish Parliamentary	William Duffy	Unopposed		
Registered electors		6,362		
Irish Parliamentary hold				

=== Elections in the 1910s ===
General election 22 January 1910: Galway South
Party	Candidate	Votes	%	±%
Irish Parliamentary	William Duffy	Unopposed		
Registered electors		6,292		
Irish Parliamentary hold				

General election 8 December 1910: Galway South
Party	Candidate	Votes	%	±%
Irish Parliamentary	William Duffy	Unopposed		
Registered electors		6,292		
Irish Parliamentary hold				

General Election 14 December 1918: Galway South
Party	Candidate	Votes	%	±%
Sinn Féin	Frank Fahy	10,621	85.9	New
Irish Parliamentary	William Duffy	1,744	14.1	N/A
Majority		8,877	71.8	N/A
Turnout		12,365	66.8	N/A
Registered electors		18,507		
Sinn Féin gain from Irish Parliamentary		Swing	N/A	
