= Elizabeth Mary Troy =

Obstetrician and Ireland's first female medical consultant

- Born: Elizabeth Mary 'Lilly' Troy; 14 September 1914; Ranelagh, Dublin, Ireland
- Died: 16 February 2011 (aged 96); Ireland
- Occupation: Obstetrician

Elizabeth Mary ('Lilly') Troy, (1914–2011), obstetrician and Ireland's first female medical consultant.

== Early life and education ==
Troy was born to Joseph Troy a hatter and outfitter, and his wife Hanna ('Johanna') (née Doran) in Ranelagh on 14 September 1914. She had two sisters and two brothers. She attended school at Loreto College, St Stephen's Green. Initially her mother persuaded her not to study medicine so she studied pharmacy in University College Dublin and graduated first in her class c.1936. Later she went back and studied medicine gaining her MB, B.Ch. and BAO with honours from UCD in 1940). She completed her internship in both St. Vincent's University Hospital and the Coombe Women & Infants University Hospital, and stayed with them for her postgraduate training. She also trained with Temple Street Children's University Hospital.

== Career ==
Troy served, with the rank of squadron leader, in the RAF as a female medical officer for three years. She was responsible for treating members both of the Women's Auxiliary Air Force and RAF. She then trained in the Jessop Hospital for Women in Sheffield, and the Oxford Street Maternity Hospital in Liverpool until she became the resident obstetrician at Royal Preston Hospital.

Her return to the Coombe as assistant master in 1949–52 made Troy the first woman to hold this post in Ireland. She finalised her MAO from UCD in July 1954 and was appointed as a consultant in 1956. Troy was a specialist in gynaecological surgery. The hospitals where she was consultant included the Bon Secours Hospital in Glasnevin and Mount Carmel Hospital in Churchtown. Despite retiring Troy continued to see her patients privately into her 90s.

Angela MacNamara, the Sunday Press agony aunt often used her as the expert for advice on reproductive issues. Troy lived in Rathmines with her brother James. One sister Mary Patricia was a GP in Wexford after graduating from medicine from UCD in 1946 while the other sister, Ethna was a dentist. Troy was involved with several charitable bodies. She was chair of the Coombe Benefit Committee from 1959 and a patron of the National Concert Hall and of Focus Ireland. She died on 16 February 2011 in Dublin and was buried in Deans Grange Cemetery.

== Sources ==
- Medical register (1943, 1975)
- Medical directory (1950, 1956)
- Thom's directory
- Irish Times, 12 July 1954, 4 Oct. 2000, 20 Oct. 2008
- J. K. Feeney (1983). The Coombe Lying-in Hospital. pp. 259–60.
- Padraig O'Morain (2007). The Health of the Nation: The Irish Healthcare System 1957-2007. Gill & Macmillan. p. 183. ISBN 978-0-7171-4184-5.
