= Joseph Edward Woodall =

English recipient of the Victoria Cross

- Born: 1 June 1896; Salford, Lancashire
- Died: 2 January 1962 (aged 65); Dún Laoghaire, Ireland
- Burial place: Deans Grange Cemetery, Dublin
- Military career
- Allegiance: United Kingdom
- Branch: British Army
- Service years: 1914–1921
- Rank: Captain
- Units: Rifle Brigade
- Conflicts: World War I
- Awards: Victoria Cross

Joseph Edward Woodall VC (1 June 1896 – 2 January 1962) was an English recipient of the Victoria Cross, the highest and most prestigious award for gallantry in the face of the enemy that can be awarded to British and Commonwealth forces.

== Military career ==
Woodall was 21 years old and a Lance-Sergeant in the 1st Battalion, The Rifle Brigade (Prince Consort's Own), British Army during the First World War when the following deed took place for which he was awarded the VC: On 11 April 1918 the 1st Battalion, Rifle Brigade was rushed up in buses to a position on the La Bassée Canal to try to stem the German breakthrough on the Lys. Over the next eleven days it was involved in severe fighting in the area around Hinges and Robecq. On 22 April, 1st Bn, Rifle Brigade, together with the 1st Hampshires, took part in an attack which helped to secure the Canal. It was during this fighting that Lance Sergeant Joseph Woodall won his Victoria Cross on the far side of the canal at La Pannerie, near Hinges.

His citation read:

La Pannerie, France, 22 April 1918, Lance Sergeant Joseph Edward Woodall, 1st Bn, The Rifle Brigade.

For most conspicuous bravery and fine leadership during an attack. (La Pannerie, France) Sjt. Woodall was in command of a platoon which, during an advance, was held up by a machine gun. On his own initiative he rushed forward and, single-handed, captured the gun and eight men. After the objective had been gained, heavy fire was encountered from a farmhouse some 200 yards in front. Sjt. Woodall collected ten men and, with great dash and gallantry, rushed the farm and took thirty prisoners. Shortly afterwards, when the officer in command was killed, he took entire command, reorganised the two platoons, and disposed them most skillfully.

Throughout the day, in spite of intense shelling and machine-gun fire, this gallant N.C.O. was constantly on the move, encouraging the men and finding out and sending back invaluable information. The example set by Sjt. Woodall was simply magnificent, and had a marked effect on the troops. The success of the operation on this portion of the front is attributed almost entirely to his coolness, courage and utter disregard for his own personal safety.

=== Investiture and later career ===
Woodall was invested with his Victoria Cross by King George V at Buckingham Palace on 23 November 1918. He stayed in the Army after the war and on 7 March 1919 became a Second Lieutenant with one of the Service Battalions of The Rifle Brigade. He retired from the Army as a captain in September 1921.

== Later life, and death ==
Woodall did not attend the 1956 VC Centenary Review, although he did attend a Festival of Remembrance in Dublin in November 1956, along with three other VC recipients - Adrian Carton de Wiart, John Moyney and James Duffy.

He died at St. Michael's Hospital, Dún Laoghaire on 2 January 1962 and was buried in Deans Grange Cemetery.

== Awards ==
Medal entitlement of Captain Joseph Edward Woodall - 1st Bn, The Rifle Brigade:

- Victoria Cross
- 1914–15 Star
- British War Medal (1914–20)
- Victory Medal (1914–19)
- King George VI Coronation Medal (1937)
- Queen Elizabeth II Coronation Medal (1953)

=== The medal ===
His Victoria Cross is displayed at the Imperial War Museum, London, England.

== Bibliography ==
- Harvey, David (2000). Monuments to Courage. Naval & Military Press Ltd. ISBN 1-84342-356-1.
- Buzzell, Nora, ed. (1997). The Register of the Victoria Cross. Cheltenham, Gloucestershire: This England Alma House. ISBN 0-906324-27-0.
- Gliddon, Gerald (2013) [2004]. Spring Offensive 1918. VCs of the First World War. Stroud, Gloucestershire: The History Press. ISBN 978-0-7524-8730-4.
- Iain 'Scoop' Stewart http://www.victoriacross.org.uk/bbwoodal.htm
