= Anna Fahy =

Anna Fahy (née Barton, 13 May 1885 – 25 September 1974) was a metal artist, Irish nationalist and republican, and member of the Cumann na mBan. She was active during the Easter Rising of 1916.

== Biography ==
Anna Maria Barton was born in Clogherbrien, Tralee, County Kerry on 13 May 1885, daughter of farmer Daniel Barton and Julia Barrett. She married Frank Fahy in 1908. They had no children.

She was a founding member of the Cumann na mBan, joining the Central Branch in its inaugural year of 1914. On 20 June 1915, she marched with the two Dublin branches of Cumann na mBan in the annual Wolfe Tone Commemoration at Bodenstown. This event was the first public use of the Cumann na mBan flag, a green, white, and gold banner embroidered with the Association's badge.

== Involvement in the 1916 Easter Rising ==
=== Before the Rising ===
As a founding member of the Irish Volunteers, Frank Fahy played an active role in events leading up to the Rising, including the Howth gun-running. Anna accompanied her husband as he took over drilling Volunteers in Galway during the school holidays, following the deportation of Liam Mellows. In 1915, the couple took Mellows into their house after his escape from prison in England, after he returned to Dublin disguised as a priest.

On Holy Thursday of Easter Week 1916, Anna brought news to Galway that the Rising was to commence, under the orders of Éamonn Ceannt. The coded message was written by Padraig Pearse to Larry Lardner, Captain of the Athenry Company, and stated to “collect the premiums at 7pm on Easter Sunday evening”. However, when she arrived in Galway, she was told that Lardner had already left for Dublin, and entrusted the message to Eamon Corbett in his place.

=== Activity in the Easter Rising ===
During the Rising, she served in the GPO, Four Courts Garrison, and Father Matthews Hall. On Easter Monday, after placing the family pets with her sister, she went first to Blackhall Place and then on to the GPO. From there, she was sent to the Four Courts, where her husband Frank was Captain of C Company, 1st Dublin Battalion under Commandant Ned Daly. She joined fellow Cumann members at Father Matthew Hall, where a post had been established to tend to the wounded.

On Thursday of Easter week, she returned to the Four Courts, noting that “I was not long there when the Helga [a British ship] started to shell the place. I couldn’t get back to Father Mathew Hall, the rifle firing was so great.” Unable to return to her First Aid work, she instead turned to cooking for the fighters, milking a goat that had strayed into the Courts for tea. She would stay there until the surrender on Saturday, 29 April, before escaping by mingling with the crowd attending Sunday mass the following morning.

=== After the Rising ===
After the surrender, some 19 men of the Four Courts garrison were tried by court martial and sentenced to death. All of the sentences were commuted to penal servitude except Daly’s. Frank Fahy was sentenced to 10 years in prison. Anna returned to her native Kerry until her husband was released from prison in June 1917. She remained a member of Cumann na mBan throughout the War of Independence. She took the Anti-Treaty side during the Civil War, and became involved in the Nationalist movement again, delivering some dispatches.

She was one of only 157 female signatures recorded in the Roll of Honour of 1916, which was presented to then Taoiseach Éamon de Valera in 1936 and deposited in the National Museum. Anna Fahy died on 25 September 1974 and is buried alongside her husband at Deans Grange Cemetery, Dublin.
