= Dean's Grange Cemetery =

Cemetery in Dún Laoghaire–Rathdown, Ireland

Coordinates: 53°17′N 6°10′W

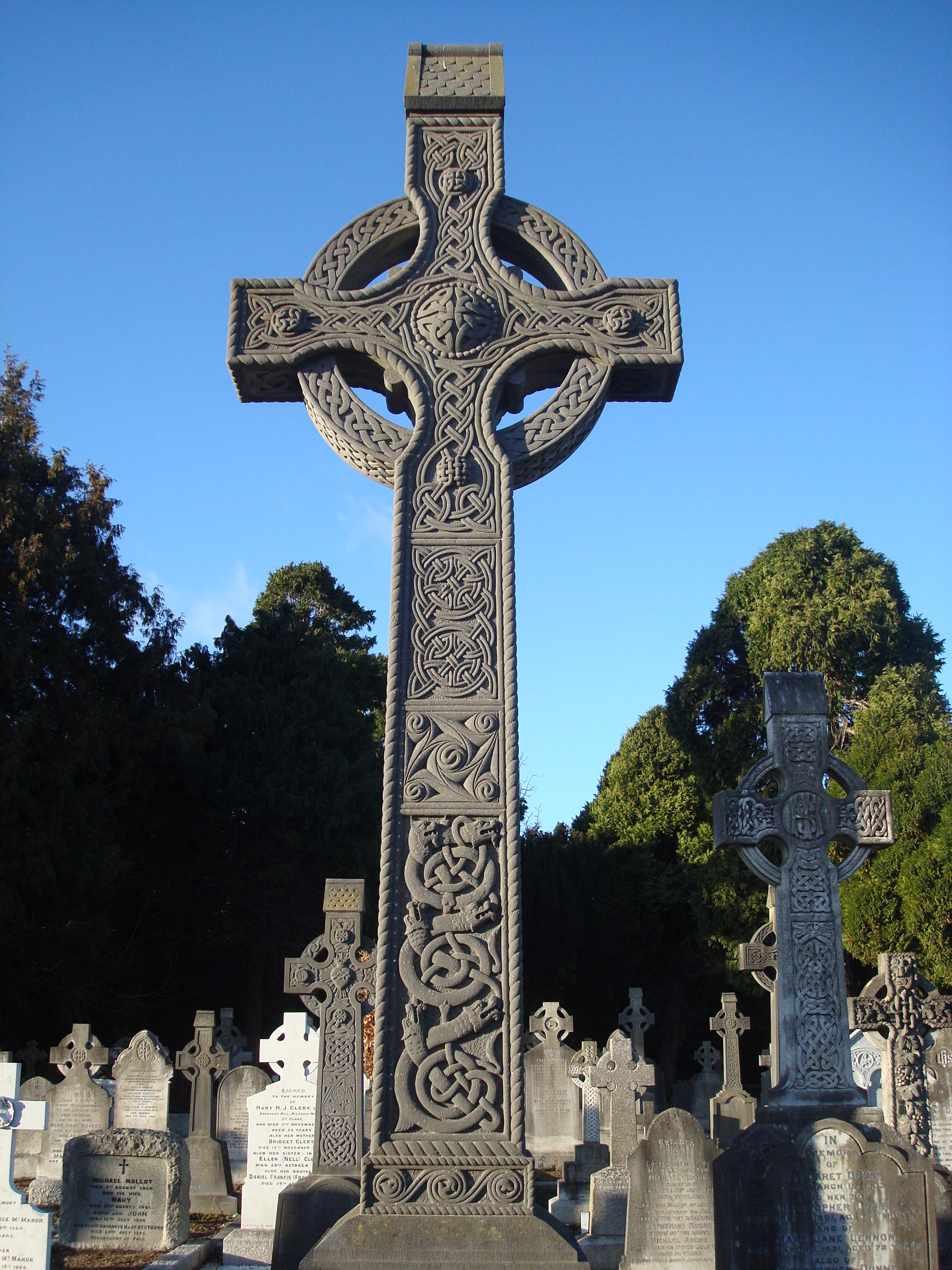
- Celtic cross in Deans Grange Cemetery
- Interactive map of Dean's Grange Cemetery

Details
- Established: 1865
- Location: Dean's Grange Road, Deansgrange, Dún Laoghaire–Rathdown
- Country: Ireland
- Type: Christian
- Size: 28.3 ha (70 acres)
- No. of interments: 150,000+

Dean's Grange Cemetery (Irish: Reilig Ghráinseach an Déin; also spelled Deansgrange) is situated in the suburban area of Deansgrange in Dún Laoghaire–Rathdown, County Dublin, Ireland. Since it first opened in 1865, over 150,000 people have been buried there. It is, together with Glasnevin and Mount Jerome, one of the largest cemeteries in the Dublin area, occupying 70 acres (28 ha).

== History ==
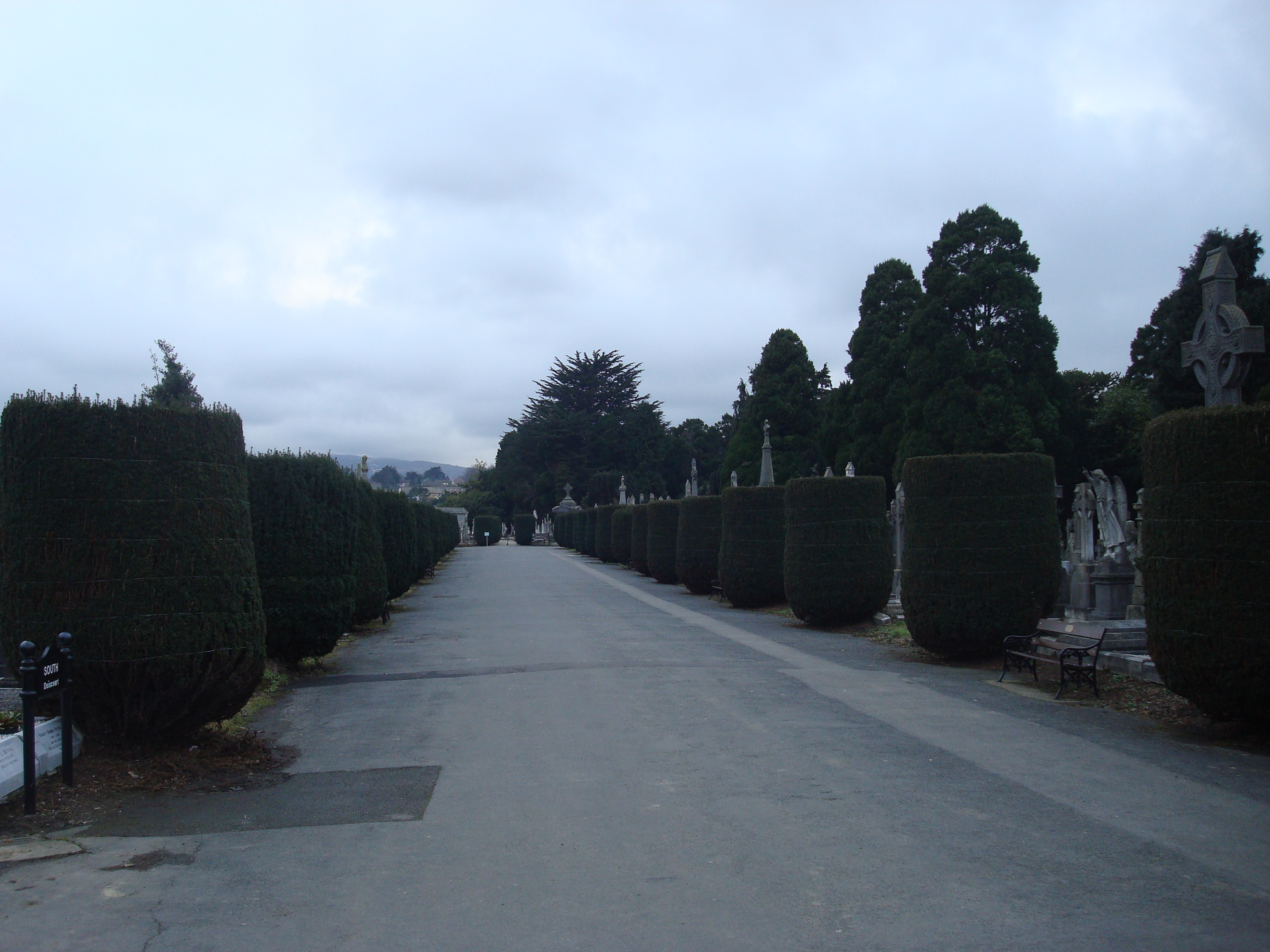
The main walkway dividing the North (Catholic) and South (Protestant) sections

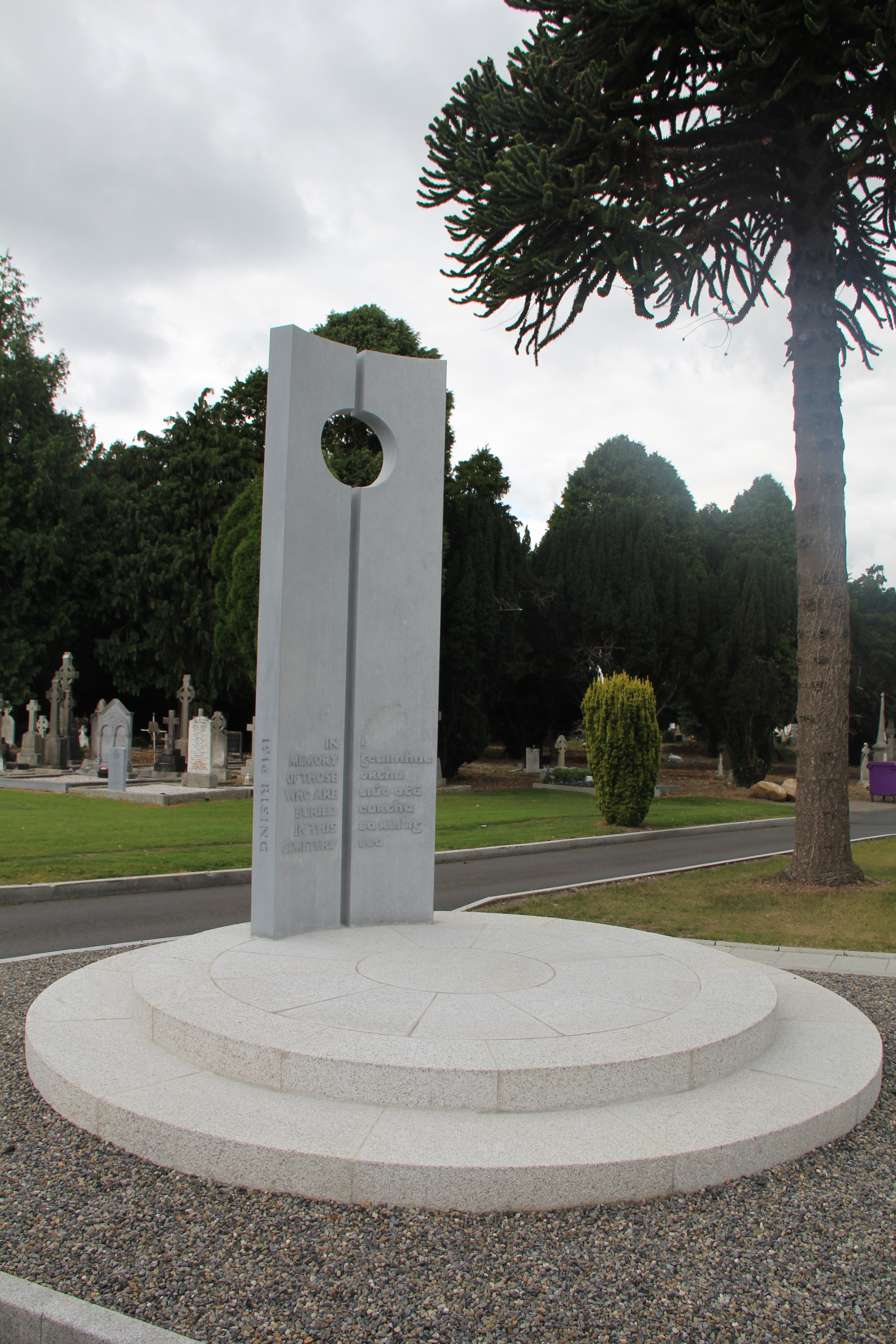
Easter Rising 1916 memorial, Deansgrange Cemetery.

The Burial Act 1855 (18 & 19 Vict. c. 128) resulted in the closure of many of the older churchyards in Dublin and its environs due to overcrowding. This drove the need to find new lands for cemeteries.

The initial cemetery consisted of just 8 acres (3.2 ha) bought by the Rathdown Union from Rev. John Beatty. The price agreed was £200 which Rev. Beatty set as being equivalent to twenty years rent. A committee was formed to run the new cemetery and on 20 November 1861 Sir George Hobson, chairman of the Guardians of the Rural Districts of the Union, signed the deeds establishing the new cemetery. The new committee set about appointing Matthew Betham as the chairman and Joseph Cope as the office clerk of administrative duties and the building of the new cemetery.

The cemetery was laid out with just two sections, North for Catholic and South for Protestant religions as well as separate chapels for both. It also consisted of a Gate Lodge (Registrar's house) and yew trees lining the main walkways. The buildings were constructed by Matthew Gahan, whose name can be seen on the metal doors to the vaults under each chapel.

The first burial in the new cemetery was on 28 January 1865, when Anastasia Carey was buried near the Catholic chapel. There were four grave types to be chosen by the families.

- 1st Class located adjacent to the main pathways and considered the most prominent and most expensive.
- 2nd Class located adjacent to the smaller pathways and expensive.
- 3rd Class surrounded by other plots where payment was required within five years. Failure to pay resulted in the grave reverting to the Burial Board for reuse.
- 4th Class on loan and reverted to the Burial Board for reuse after a number of years.

Since the opening of the cemetery two sections were added, South West and West, and the North section was extended. From the 1930s more land was bought and new sections were created and named after different saints bringing the total number of sections to 16.

In 1984 a sister cemetery was opened south of Shankill village called Shanganagh Cemetery and occupying 50 acres (200,000 m^{2}). By the late 1980s, the cemetery was running out of space and it was decided to stop selling new grave spaces. However, recent proposals around 2008 will see a small number of improvements and spaces made available.

The gate lodge was lived in by the registrar until the late 1990s when it was vacated.

Today Dean's Grange Cemetery is administered by Dún Laoghaire-Rathdown County Council.

== Notable burials ==
John McCormack (1884–1945), world-famous tenor

Interred in the cemetery are people from notable events in local and Irish history.

- The 15 local men of the Kingstown Lifeboat Disaster in 1895 who crewed a rescue boat involved in an attempt to rescue the Palme.
- The Angels plot was used from 1905 to 1989 to bury children. It is estimated that 750 children are buried here. Cemetery staff renovated the plot around 2008.
- During the 1916 Easter Rising, the cemetery saw the burial of about 50 people connected to the rising. They were either innocent civilian victims, members of the Irish Volunteers and the Irish Citizen Army, or British Army soldiers. There is a plot with 6 people buried and the rest are buried by their respective families.
- RMS Leinster was torpedoed by the German submarine SM UB-123 12 miles (19 km) from Dún Laoghaire on 10 October 1918. Eleven known victims are buried in the cemetery.

United Kingdom armed services casualties of the 1916 rising and the Leinster sinking are among the 75 Commonwealth service personnel of World War I who are buried in this cemetery, as are 27 from World War II, whose graves are registered and maintained by the Commonwealth War Graves Commission.

Also interred at Deans Grange:

- Todd Andrews (1901–1985), Irish Republican political and military activist, later civil servant
- Mona Baptiste (1926–1993), singer
- Louie Bennett (1870–1956), suffragette, trade unionist, journalist and writer
- Richard Irvine Best (1872–1959), Celtic scholar
- Jasper Brett (1895–1917), Irish rugby international and Royal Dublin Fusiliers officer
- Francis Browning (1868–1916), cricketer and President of the Irish Rugby Football Union
- Joseph Campbell (1879–1944), poet
- Kathleen Clarke (1878–1972), Irish republican Sinn Féin and Fianna Fáil TD and Senator and widow of the Irish revolutionary Thomas J. Clarke
- John A. Costello (1891–1976), Taoiseach and Fine Gael politician.
- Rickard Deasy (1812–1883), lawyer and judge; Member of Parliament for County Cork
- Denis Devlin (1908–1959), poet
- Beatrice Doran (died 2025), librarian, historian, and author
- John Boyd Dunlop (1840–1921), Scottish inventor of the pneumatic tyre
- Reginald Dunne (1898–1922), executed Irish republican
- Frank Fahy (1880–1953), Teachta Dála (TD) and Ceann Comhairle (speaker), buried alongside his wife Anna Fahy
- Barry Fitzgerald (1888–1961), actor
- Alice Stopford Green (1847–1929), historian
- John Edward Healy (1872–1934), longest serving editor of the Irish Times (1907–34)
- Augustine Henry (1857–1930), botanist
- Seosamh Laoide (1865–1939), scholar and a major figure in Conradh na Gaeilge.
- Seán Lemass (1899–1971), Taoiseach and Fianna Fáil politician
- Kathleen Lynn (1874–1955), suffragette, member of the Irish Citizen Army and TD for Dublin County
- Donagh MacDonagh (1912–1968), writer and judge
- John McCormack (1884–1945), tenor; papal count
- F. J. McCormick (1889–1947), actor
- Joseph McGrath (1887–1966), politician and a founder of the Irish Hospitals' Sweepstake
- Anew McMaster (1891–1962), actor-manager
- Brinsley MacNamara (1890–1963), author of The Valley of the Squinting Windows
- John D. J. Moore (1910–1988), US Ambassador to Ireland (1969–75), interred next to his wife and a daughter
- Dermot Morgan (1952–1998), comedian and actor
- Delia Murphy (1902–1971), singer and collector of Irish ballads
- Michael "Sonny" Murphy, from Kilnaboy, County Clare who represented Ireland at the 1932 Los Angeles Olympic games
- John Gardiner Nutting (1852–1918), baronet of St. Helen's, Booterstown
- Art O'Brien (Irish republican) (1872-1949), leader of Irish language movement and mediator during Anglo-Irish Treaty negotiations
- Leon Ó Broin (1902–1990), writer
- Frank O'Connor (1903–1966), writer, pseudonym of Michael O'Donovan
- Sinéad O'Connor (1966–2023), singer/songwriter and political activist
- Séamas Ó Maoileoin (1893–1959), Irish War of Independence veteran
- Brian Ó Nualláin (literary name Flann O'Brien; 1911–1966), novelist
- Milo O'Shea (1926–2013), actor
- Pádraig Ó Siochfhradha (1883–1964), writer and teacher of Gaeilge
- Joseph O'Sullivan (1897–1922), executed Irish republican
- John Howard Parnell (1846–1923), politician and older brother to Charles Stewart Parnell
- Vladimir Pecherin (1807-1885), Russian Romantic poet, Classicist, nihilist, and, following his conversion from Atheism to Christianity, a Roman Catholic priest working among the poor and destitute in the tenement slums of Dublin.
- John Talbot Power, 3rd Baronet of Edermine (1845–1901) of Leopardstown Park; grandson of the founder of Power's Distillery, Dublin
- Robert Lloyd Praeger (1865–1953), Irish botanist and naturalist
- Noel Purcell (1900–1985), actor
- Senator William Quirke (1896–1955), Fianna Fáil politician, businessman and IRA leader in Tipperary (Irish War of Independence, Irish Civil War)
- Arthur Shields (1896–1970), actor Brother of Barry Fitzgerald
- Elizabeth Mary Troy (1914–2011), obstetrician
- Ernest Walton (1903–1995), physicist and Nobel Laureate
- Joseph Edward Woodall (1896–1962), winner of the Victoria Cross

There are also many members of Roman Catholic religious orders buried here such as the Congregation of Christian Brothers, Daughters of the Cross, Holy Ghost Fathers, Irish Vincentians, the Little Sisters of the Assumption and the Missionaries of the Sacred Heart.
