= John A. Costello =

Taoiseach (1948–1951, 1954–1957)

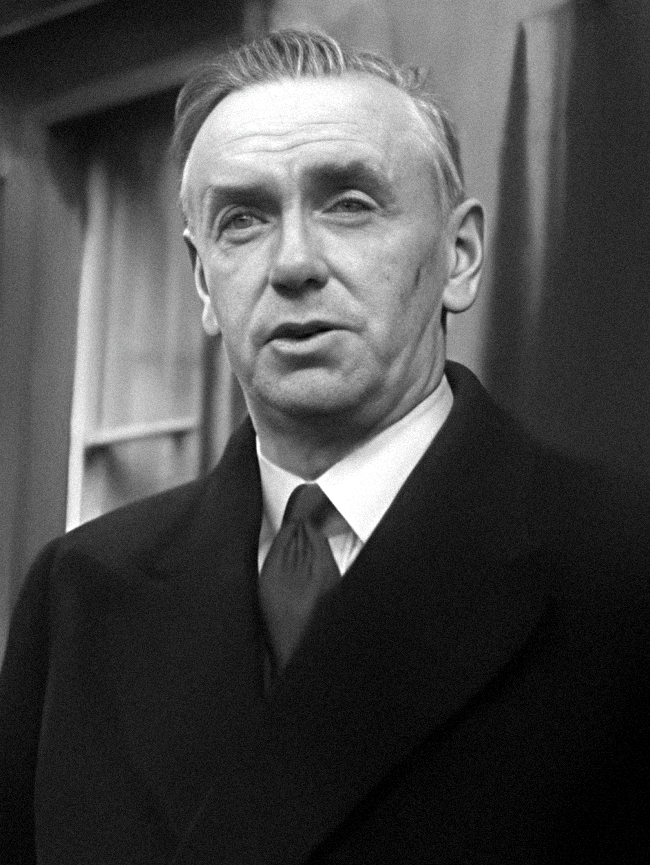
- Costello in 1948

Taoiseach
- In office 2 June 1954 – 20 March 1957
- President: Seán T. O'Kelly
- Tánaiste: William Norton
- Preceded by: Éamon de Valera
- Succeeded by: Éamon de Valera
- In office 18 February 1948 – 13 June 1951
- President: Seán T. O'Kelly
- Tánaiste: William Norton
- Preceded by: Éamon de Valera
- Succeeded by: Éamon de Valera

Leader of the Opposition
- In office 20 March 1957 – 21 October 1959
- Taoiseach: Éamon de Valera; Seán Lemass
- Preceded by: Éamon de Valera
- Succeeded by: James Dillon
- In office 13 June 1951 – 2 June 1954
- Taoiseach: Éamon de Valera
- Preceded by: Éamon de Valera
- Succeeded by: Éamon de Valera

Attorney General of Ireland
- In office 9 January 1926 – 9 March 1932
- President: W. T. Cosgrave
- Preceded by: John O'Byrne
- Succeeded by: Conor Maguire

Teachta Dála
- In office February 1948 – June 1969
- Constituency: Dublin South-East
- In office May 1944 – February 1948
- In office July 1937 – June 1943
- Constituency: Dublin Townships
- In office January 1933 – July 1937
- Constituency: Dublin County

Personal details
- Born: 20 June 1891 Fairview, Dublin, Ireland
- Died: 5 January 1976 (aged 84) Ranelagh, Dublin, Ireland
- Resting place: Deans Grange Cemetery, Dublin, Ireland
- Party: Fine Gael
- Spouse: Ida Mary O'Malley (m. 1919; died 1956)
- Children: 4, including Declan
- Relatives: Caroline Costello (granddaughter)
- Education: University College Dublin; King's Inns

John Aloysius Costello (20 June 1891 – 5 January 1976) was an Irish Fine Gael politician who served as Taoiseach from 1948 to 1951 and from 1954 to 1957. He was leader of the opposition from 1951 to 1954 and from 1957 to 1959 and attorney general from 1926 to 1932. He served as a Teachta Dála (TD) from 1933 to 1943 and from 1944 to 1969.

== Early life ==
Costello was born on 20 June 1891, in Fairview, Dublin. He was the younger son of John Costello senior, a civil servant, and Rose Callaghan. He was educated at St Joseph's, Fairview and then moved to O'Connell School for senior classes. He later attended University College Dublin, where he graduated with a degree in modern languages and law. He studied at King's Inns to become a barrister, winning the Victoria Prize there in 1913 and 1914.

Costello was called to the Irish Bar in 1914 and practised as a barrister until 1922.

== Irish Free State ==
In 1922, Costello joined the staff at the office of the attorney general in the newly established Irish Free State. Three years later he was called to the inner bar, and the following year, 1926, he became attorney general upon the formation of the Cumann na nGaedheal government led by W. T. Cosgrave. While serving in this position he represented the Free State at Imperial Conferences and League of Nations meetings.

He was also elected a bencher of the Honourable Society of King's Inns. Costello lost his position as attorney general when Fianna Fáil came to power in 1932. The following year, however, he was elected to Dáil Éireann as a Cumann na nGaedheal TD. His party soon merged with other parties to form Fine Gael.

=== Blueshirts speech ===
On 28 February 1934, a Dáil debate was held on a bill to outlaw the wearing of uniforms (specifically designed to curtail the Blueshirts, a uniformed movement then associated with Fine Gael and formed to defend their candidates, meeting and rallies from IRA attack). Costello made a speech opposing the bill that has generated controversy ever since. In response to an assertion by minister for justice P. J. Ruttledge, that the Blueshirts had fascist leanings like the Italian Blackshirts and German Brownshirts, and that other European nations had taken similar actions against similar organisations, Costello stated:

The Minister gave extracts from various laws on the Continent, but he carefully refrained from drawing attention to the fact that the Blackshirts were victorious in Italy and that the Hitler Shirts were victorious in Germany, as, assuredly, in spite of this Bill [..] the Blueshirts will be victorious in the Irish Free State.

The remark was a small part of a much longer speech whose main point was that the bill was an unconstitutional overreaction by the Fianna Fáil government and an unfair scapegoating of the Blueshirts movement. However, the quote has since been the subject of much debate regarding the extent to which the Blueshirts, and by extension Fine Gael – and Costello himself – had ties to European fascist movements.

=== Other Dáil activity ===
During the Dáil debate on the Emergency Powers Act 1939, Costello was highly critical of the act's arrogation of powers, stating:

We are asked not merely to give a blank cheque, but, to give an uncrossed cheque to the Government.

He lost his seat at the general election of 1943 but regained it when de Valera called a snap election in 1944. From 1944 to 1948, he was Fine Gael front-bench spokesman on External Affairs.

=== 1948 general election ===
In 1948, Fianna Fáil had been in power for sixteen consecutive years and had been blamed for a downturn in the economy following World War II. The general election results showed Fianna Fáil short of a majority, but still by far the largest party and appearing to be headed for a seventh term in government.

However, the other parties in the Dáil realised that between them, they had only one seat fewer than Fianna Fáil; if they banded together, they would be able to form a government with the support of seven Independent deputies. Fine Gael, the Labour Party, the National Labour Party, Clann na Poblachta and Clann na Talmhan joined to form the first inter-party government in the history of the Irish state.

== Taoiseach (1948–1951) ==
British Movietone newsreel reporting upon Costello's ascension to the office of Taoiseach

Since Fine Gael was the largest party in the coalition government, it had the task of providing a suitable candidate for Taoiseach. The Fine Gael leader, Richard Mulcahy, was unacceptable to Clann na Poblachta and its deeply republican leader, Seán MacBride. This was due to Mulcahy's record during the Irish Civil War. Instead, Fine Gael and Clann na Poblachta agreed on Costello as a compromise candidate. Costello had never held a ministerial position nor was he involved in the Civil War. When told by Mulcahy of his nomination Costello was appalled, being content with his life as a barrister and as a part-time politician. He was persuaded to accept the nomination as Taoiseach by close non-political friends.

=== Declaration of the republic ===
During the campaign, Clann na Poblachta had promised to repeal the External Relations Act of 1936 but did not make an issue of this when the government was being formed. However, Costello and his Tánaiste, William Norton of the Labour Party, also disliked the act. During the summer of 1948, the cabinet discussed repealing the act; however, no firm decision was made.

In September 1948, Costello was on an official visit to Canada when a reporter asked him about the possibility of Ireland leaving the British Commonwealth. Costello, for the first time, declared publicly that the Irish government was indeed going to repeal the External Relations Act and declare Ireland a republic. It has been suggested that this was a reaction to offence caused by the Governor General of Canada at the time, the Earl Alexander of Tunis, who was of Northern Irish descent and who allegedly arranged to have placed symbols of Northern Ireland—notably a replica of the famous Roaring Meg cannon used in the Siege of Derry—in front of Costello at an official dinner. Costello made no mention of these aspects on the second reading of the Republic of Ireland Bill on 24 November and, in his memoirs, claimed that Alexander's behaviour had been perfectly civil and could have had no bearing on a decision which had already been made.

The news took the Government of the United Kingdom and even some of Costello's ministers by surprise. The former had not been consulted and, following the declaration of the Republic in 1949, the UK passed the Ireland Act that year. This recognised the Republic of Ireland and guaranteed the position of Northern Ireland within the United Kingdom for so long as a majority there wanted to remain in the United Kingdom. It also granted full rights to any citizens of the republic living in the United Kingdom. Ireland left the Commonwealth on 18 April 1949, when the Republic of Ireland Act 1948 came into force. Frederick Henry Boland, Secretary of the Department of External Affairs, said caustically that the affair demonstrated that "the Taoiseach has as much notion of diplomacy as I have of astrology." The British envoy Lord Rugby was equally critical of what he called a "slipshod and amateur" move.

Many nationalists now saw partition as the last obstacle on the road to total national independence. Costello tabled a motion of protest against partition on 10 May 1949, without result.

=== Mother and Child Scheme ===
In 1950, the independent-minded Minister for Health, Noel Browne, introduced the Mother and Child Scheme. The scheme would provide mothers with free maternity treatment and their children with free medical care up to the age of sixteen, which was the normal provision in other parts of Europe at that time. The bill was opposed by doctors, who feared a loss of income, and Roman Catholic bishops, who opposed the lack of means testing envisaged and feared the scheme could lead to birth control and abortion. The cabinet was divided over the issue, many feeling that the state could not afford such a scheme priced at IR£2,000,000 annually. Costello and others in the cabinet made it clear that in the face of such opposition, they would not support the Minister. Browne resigned from the government on 11 April 1951, and the scheme was dropped. He immediately published his correspondence with Costello and the bishops, something which had hitherto not been done. Derivatives of the Mother and Child Scheme would be introduced in the Public Health Acts of 1954, 1957 and 1970.

Costello took the opportunity to reconfirm his beliefs in Catholicism on 12 April 1951, in his speech on Dr. Browne's resignation:

I have no hesitation in saying that we, as a Government, representing a people, the overwhelming majority of whom are of the one faith, who have a special position in the Constitution, when we are given advice or warnings by the authoritative people in the Catholic Church, on matters strictly confined to faith and morals, so long as I am here—and I am sure I speak for my colleagues—will give to their directions, given within that scope—and I have no doubt that they do not desire in the slightest to go one fraction of an inch outside the sphere of faith and morals—our complete obedience and allegiance." ... "I am an Irishman second, I am a Catholic first, and I accept without qualification in all respects the teaching of the hierarchy and the church to which I belong.

=== Coalition achievements ===
The Costello government had several noteworthy achievements. The Industrial Development Authority and Córas Tráchtála were established, and the Minister for Health, Noel Browne, with the new Streptomycin, brought about an advance in the treatment of tuberculosis. A major housebuilding programme was launched, which saw a tenfold increase in local authority new build. Increases in various kinds of pensions were carried out, together with a modification of the means test, and a bill providing for a weekly half-holiday for agricultural workers was also passed.

Ireland also joined a number of organisations such as the Organization for European Economic Co-operation and the Council of Europe. However, the government refused to join NATO, allegedly because the British remained in Northern Ireland. The scheme to supply electricity to even the remotest parts of Ireland was also accelerated.

=== Election defeat ===
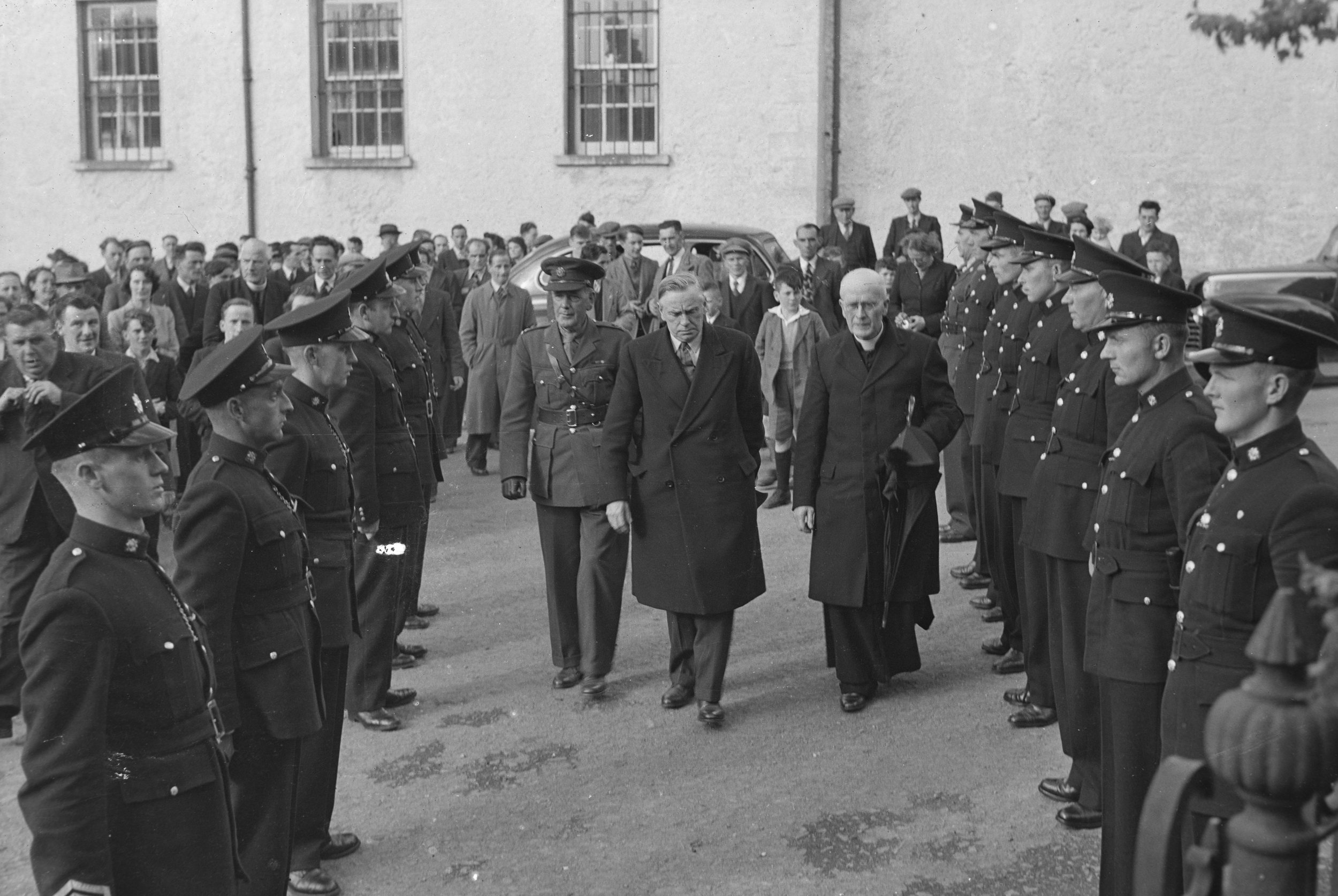
Taoiseach John A. Costello inspecting the ranks of the Garda Síochána in Glenties during the 1951 election campaign

While the "Mother and Child" incident did destabilise the government to some extent, it did not lead to its collapse as is generally thought. The government continued; however, prices were rising, a balance of payments crisis was looming, and two TDs withdrew their support for the government. These incidents added to the pressure on Costello and so he decided to call a general election for June 1951. The result was inconclusive but Fianna Fáil returned to power. Costello resigned as Taoiseach. It was at this election that Costello's son Declan was elected to the Dáil.

Over the next three years while Fianna Fáil was in power a dual-leadership role of Fine Gael was taking place. While Richard Mulcahy was the leader of the party, Costello, who had proved his skill as Taoiseach, remained as parliamentary leader of the party. He resumed his practice at the Bar; what is arguably his most celebrated case, the successful defence of The Leader against a libel action brought by the poet Patrick Kavanagh, dates from this period. Kavanagh generously praised Costello's forensic skill, and the two men became friends.

== Taoiseach (1954–1957) ==
At the 1954 general election Fianna Fáil lost power. A campaign dominated by economic issues resulted in a Fine Gael-Labour Party-Clann na Talmhan government coming to power. Costello was elected Taoiseach for the second time.

The government could do little to change the ailing nature of Ireland's economy, with emigration and unemployment remaining high, and external problems such as the Suez Crisis compounding the difficulty. Measures to expand the Irish economy such as export profits tax relief introduced in 1956 would take years to have a sizable impact. Costello's government did have some success with Ireland becoming a member of the United Nations in 1955, and a highly successful visit to the United States in 1956, which began the custom by which the Taoiseach visits the White House each Saint Patrick's Day to present the US President with a bowl of shamrock. Although the government had a comfortable majority and seemed set for a full term in office, a resumption of IRA activity in Northern Ireland and Great Britain caused internal strains (see Border Campaign). The government took strong action against the republicans.

Despite supporting the government from the backbenches, Seán MacBride, the leader of Clann na Poblachta, tabled a motion of no confidence, based on the weakening state of the economy and in opposition to the government's stance on the IRA. Fianna Fáil also tabled its motion of no confidence, and, rather than face almost certain defeat, Costello again asked President Seán T. O'Kelly to dissolve the Oireachtas. The general election which followed in 1957 gave Fianna Fáil an overall majority and started another sixteen years of unbroken rule for the party. Some of his colleagues questioned the wisdom of Costello's decision to call an election; the view was expressed that he was tired of politics, and depressed by his wife's sudden death the previous year.

== Retirement ==
Following the defeat of his government, Costello returned to the bar. In 1959, when Richard Mulcahy resigned the leadership of Fine Gael to James Dillon, Costello retired to the backbenches. Costello could have become party leader had he been willing to act in a full-time capacity. He remained as a TD until 1969, when he retired from politics, being succeeded as Fine Gael TD for Dublin South-East by Garret FitzGerald, who himself went on to become Taoiseach in a Fine Gael-led government.

During his career, he was presented with several awards from many universities in the United States. He was also a member of the Royal Irish Academy from 1948. In March 1975, he was made a freeman of the city of Dublin, along with his old political opponent Éamon de Valera. He practised at the bar until a short time before his death, in Dublin, on 5 January 1976, at the age of 84.

== Governments ==
The following governments were led by Costello:

- 5th government of Ireland (February 1948 – June 1951)
- 7th government of Ireland (June 1954 – March 1957)

== See also ==
- List of people on the postage stamps of Ireland

Legal offices
Preceded by John O'Byrne	Attorney General of Ireland; 1926–1932	Succeeded by Conor Maguire
Political offices
Preceded by Richard Mulcahy	Parliamentary Leader of Fine Gael; 1948–1959	Succeeded by James Dillon
Preceded by Éamon de Valera	Taoiseach; 1948–1951	Succeeded by Éamon de Valera
Preceded by Noel Browne	Minister for Health; Apr–Jun 1951 (acting)	Succeeded by James Ryan
Preceded by Éamon de Valera	Leader of the Opposition; 1951–1954	Succeeded by Éamon de Valera
Preceded by Éamon de Valera	Taoiseach; 1954–1957	Succeeded by Éamon de Valera
Preceded by Éamon de Valera	Leader of the Opposition; 1957–1959	Succeeded by James Dillon

Dáil	Election	Deputy (Party)	Deputy (Party)	Deputy (Party)	Deputy (Party)	Deputy (Party)	Deputy (Party)	Deputy (Party)	Deputy (Party)
2nd	1921	Michael Derham (SF)	George Gavan Duffy (SF)	Séamus Dwyer (SF)	Desmond FitzGerald (SF)	Frank Lawless (SF)	Margaret Pearse (SF)	6 seats 1921–1923	
3rd	1922	Michael Derham (PT-SF)	George Gavan Duffy (PT-SF)	Thomas Johnson (Lab)	Desmond FitzGerald (PT-SF)	Darrell Figgis (Ind)	John Rooney (FP)	6 seats 1921–1923	
4th	1923	Michael Derham (CnaG)	Bryan Cooper (Ind)	Thomas Johnson (Lab)	Desmond FitzGerald (CnaG)	Darrell Figgis (Ind)	John Good (Ind)	Kathleen Lynn (Rep)	Kevin O'Higgins (CnaG)
4th	1924 by-election	Batt O'Connor (CnaG)	Bryan Cooper (Ind)	Thomas Johnson (Lab)	Desmond FitzGerald (CnaG)	Darrell Figgis (Ind)	John Good (Ind)	Kathleen Lynn (Rep)	Kevin O'Higgins (CnaG)
4th	1926 by-election	Batt O'Connor (CnaG)	Bryan Cooper (Ind)	Thomas Johnson (Lab)	Desmond FitzGerald (CnaG)	William Norton (Lab)	John Good (Ind)	Kathleen Lynn (Rep)	Kevin O'Higgins (CnaG)
5th	1927 (Jun)	Batt O'Connor (CnaG)	Bryan Cooper (Ind)	Thomas Johnson (Lab)	Desmond FitzGerald (CnaG)	Patrick Belton (FF)	John Good (Ind)	Seán MacEntee (FF)	Kevin O'Higgins (CnaG)
5th	1927 by-election	Batt O'Connor (CnaG)	Bryan Cooper (Ind)	Thomas Johnson (Lab)	Desmond FitzGerald (CnaG)	Patrick Belton (FF)	John Good (Ind)	Seán MacEntee (FF)	Gearóid O'Sullivan (CnaG)
6th	1927 (Sep)	Batt O'Connor (CnaG)	Bryan Cooper (CnaG)	Joseph Murphy (Ind)	Desmond FitzGerald (CnaG)	Seán Brady (FF)	John Good (Ind)	Seán MacEntee (FF)	Gearóid O'Sullivan (CnaG)
6th	1930 by-election	Batt O'Connor (CnaG)	Thomas Finlay (CnaG)	Joseph Murphy (Ind)	Desmond FitzGerald (CnaG)	Seán Brady (FF)	John Good (Ind)	Seán MacEntee (FF)	Gearóid O'Sullivan (CnaG)
7th	1932	Batt O'Connor (CnaG)	Thomas Finlay (CnaG)	Patrick Curran (Lab)	Henry Dockrell (CnaG)	Seán Brady (FF)	John Good (Ind)	Seán MacEntee (FF)	Gearóid O'Sullivan (CnaG)
8th	1933	Batt O'Connor (CnaG)	John A. Costello (CnaG)	Margaret Mary Pearse (FF)	Henry Dockrell (CnaG)	Seán Brady (FF)	John Good (Ind)	Seán MacEntee (FF)	Gearóid O'Sullivan (CnaG)
8th	1935 by-election	Cecil Lavery (FG)	John A. Costello (CnaG)	Margaret Mary Pearse (FF)	Henry Dockrell (CnaG)	Seán Brady (FF)	John Good (Ind)	Seán MacEntee (FF)	Gearóid O'Sullivan (CnaG)
9th	1937	Cecil Lavery (FG)	Henry Dockrell (FG)	Gerrard McGowan (Lab)	Patrick Fogarty (FF)	Seán Brady (FF)	5 seats 1937–1948		
10th	1938	Patrick Belton (FG)	Henry Dockrell (FG)	Thomas Mullen (FF)	Patrick Fogarty (FF)	Seán Brady (FF)	5 seats 1937–1948		
11th	1943	Liam Cosgrave (FG)	Henry Dockrell (FG)	James Tunney (Lab)	Patrick Fogarty (FF)	Seán Brady (FF)	5 seats 1937–1948		
12th	1944	Liam Cosgrave (FG)	Henry Dockrell (FG)	Patrick Burke (FF)	Patrick Fogarty (FF)	Seán Brady (FF)	5 seats 1937–1948		
12th	1947 by-election	Liam Cosgrave (FG)	Henry Dockrell (FG)	Patrick Burke (FF)	Seán MacBride (CnaP)	Seán Brady (FF)	5 seats 1937–1948		
13th	1948	Éamon Rooney (FG)	Seán Dunne (Lab)	Patrick Burke (FF)	3 seats 1948–1961				
14th	1951	Éamon Rooney (FG)	Seán Dunne (Lab)	Patrick Burke (FF)	3 seats 1948–1961				
15th	1954	Éamon Rooney (FG)	Seán Dunne (Lab)	Patrick Burke (FF)	3 seats 1948–1961				
16th	1957	Éamon Rooney (FG)	Kevin Boland (FF)	Patrick Burke (FF)	3 seats 1948–1961				
17th	1961	Éamon Rooney (FG)	Kevin Boland (FF)	Patrick Burke (FF)	Mark Clinton (FG)	Seán Dunne (Ind)	5 seats 1961–1969		
18th	1965	Des Foley (FF)	Kevin Boland (FF)	Patrick Burke (FF)	Mark Clinton (FG)	Seán Dunne (Lab)	5 seats 1961–1969		
19th	1969	Constituency abolished. See Dublin County North and Dublin County South							

Dáil	Election	Deputy (Party)	Deputy (Party)	Deputy (Party)
9th	1937	Seán MacEntee (FF)	John A. Costello (FG)	Ernest Benson (FG)
10th	1938	Seán MacEntee (FF)	John A. Costello (FG)	Ernest Benson (FG)
11th	1943	Seán MacEntee (FF)	Bernard Butler (FF)	Ernest Benson (FG)
12th	1944	Seán MacEntee (FF)	Bernard Butler (FF)	John A. Costello (FG)
13th	1948	Constituency abolished. See Dublin South-East		

Dáil	Election	Deputy (Party)	Deputy (Party)	Deputy (Party)	Deputy (Party)
13th	1948	John A. Costello (FG)	Seán MacEntee (FF)	Noël Browne (CnaP)	3 seats 1948–1981
14th	1951	John A. Costello (FG)	Seán MacEntee (FF)	Noël Browne (Ind.)	3 seats 1948–1981
15th	1954	John A. Costello (FG)	Seán MacEntee (FF)	John O'Donovan (FG)	3 seats 1948–1981
16th	1957	John A. Costello (FG)	Seán MacEntee (FF)	Noël Browne (Ind.)	3 seats 1948–1981
17th	1961	John A. Costello (FG)	Seán MacEntee (FF)	Noël Browne (NPD)	3 seats 1948–1981
18th	1965	John A. Costello (FG)	Seán MacEntee (FF)	Seán Moore (FF)	3 seats 1948–1981
19th	1969	Garret FitzGerald (FG)	Noël Browne (Lab)	Seán Moore (FF)	3 seats 1948–1981
20th	1973	Garret FitzGerald (FG)	Fergus O'Brien (FG)	Seán Moore (FF)	3 seats 1948–1981
21st	1977	Garret FitzGerald (FG)	Ruairi Quinn (Lab)	Seán Moore (FF)	3 seats 1948–1981
22nd	1981	Garret FitzGerald (FG)	Gerard Brady (FF)	Seán Moore (FF)	Richie Ryan (FG)
23rd	1982 (Feb)	Garret FitzGerald (FG)	Gerard Brady (FF)	Ruairi Quinn (Lab)	Alexis FitzGerald Jnr (FG)
24th	1982 (Nov)	Garret FitzGerald (FG)	Gerard Brady (FF)	Ruairi Quinn (Lab)	Joe Doyle (FG)
25th	1987	Garret FitzGerald (FG)	Gerard Brady (FF)	Ruairi Quinn (Lab)	Michael McDowell (PDs)
26th	1989	Garret FitzGerald (FG)	Gerard Brady (FF)	Ruairi Quinn (Lab)	Joe Doyle (FG)
27th	1992	Frances Fitzgerald (FG)	Eoin Ryan Jnr (FF)	Ruairi Quinn (Lab)	Michael McDowell (PDs)
28th	1997	Frances Fitzgerald (FG)	Eoin Ryan Jnr (FF)	Ruairi Quinn (Lab)	John Gormley (GP)
29th	2002	Michael McDowell (PDs)	Eoin Ryan Jnr (FF)	Ruairi Quinn (Lab)	John Gormley (GP)
30th	2007	Lucinda Creighton (FG)	Chris Andrews (FF)	Ruairi Quinn (Lab)	John Gormley (GP)
31st	2011	Lucinda Creighton (FG)	Eoghan Murphy (FG)	Ruairi Quinn (Lab)	Kevin Humphreys (Lab)
32nd	2016	Constituency abolished. See Dublin Bay South.			
