= Aindrias Ó Caoimh =

Aindrias Ó Caoimh may refer to:

- Aindrias Ó Caoimh (attorney general) (1912–1994), Attorney General of Ireland, 1954 and 1957–1967
- Aindrias Ó Caoimh (judge) (born 1950), his son, member of European Court of Justice since 2004
