= Patrick McGilligan =

Patrick McGilligan may refer to:

- Patrick McGilligan (Fine Gael politician) (1889-1979), Irish politician who served as Attorney General of Ireland from 1954 to 1957 as well as several ministerial positions
- Patrick McGilligan (Irish nationalist politician) (1847–1917), Irish politician, MP for South Fermanagh from 1892 until 1895
- Patrick McGilligan (biographer) (born 1951), Irish American biographer
