= Thomas Teevan =

Thomas Teevan may refer to:

- Thomas Teevan (Unionist politician) (1927–1954), Ulster Unionist Party politician and lawyer
- Thomas Teevan (attorney general) (1903–1976), Irish barrister and judge
