= Insurance Institute of Ireland =

Professional body in Ireland

- Abbreviation: III
- Formation: 1885; 141 years ago
- Type: Professional training and education body
- Headquarters: Dublin, Ireland
- Region served: Ireland
- Members: 17,500 (2019)
- Website: www.iii.ie

The Insurance Institute of Ireland (III) is a professional training and education body for the Irish insurance sector. It was founded in 1885. The institute is involved in establishing and maintaining standards of professionalism, providing education, and delivering training for the general insurance market in Ireland.

As of 2019, it had a membership of over 17,500 individuals across the country. The III has regional institutes in Dublin, Cork, Limerick, Galway and Sligo, with the Insurance Institute of Cork established in 1923. The III publishes The Insider magazine. It is a nominating body for the Industrial and Commercial Panel at the Seanad Éireann elections.

Some documents pertaining to the Insurance Institute of Ireland are stored in the National Library of Ireland.

== History ==
James Law of the Crown Life Assurance Company (located at 46–47 Dame St, Dublin City) sent out proposals on 22 May 1885 to insurers for the purpose of forming an Insurance Institute of Ireland. On 1 June 1885, the first meeting in which the Insurance Institute of Ireland was founded took place at 2–4 College Green, Dublin, then home of the National Assurance Company of Ireland. In 1924, it was described as the third-oldest institute for the insurance sector on the British Isles.

During an April 1936 parliamentary debate, Patrick McGilligan, in criticism of the political outlook of Seán Lemass, then Minister of Industry and Commerce, referenced a quote made by him whilst addressing a meeting of the Insurance Institute of Ireland in December 1935.

In May 1986, Alan Dukes, speaking in an Oireachtas debate, declared that the then president-elect of the Insurance Institute of Ireland informed attendees at an assembly that a decrease in criminal activity had been evident in the reduced frequency of claims for insurance related to specific criminal activities, such as robbery.

According to the III's website, it had approximately 17,500 members as of 2019.

Denis Casey, former group chief executive of the Irish Life and Permanent group, who according to the Irish Independent in 2024 "was convicted of a €7.2bn conspiracy to defraud, after the longest criminal trail in Irish history", had previously been involved in the Insurance Institute of Ireland.
