= Teevan =

Teevan is a surname. It originated as an Anglicised form of Irish and Scottish Gaelic Ó Teimheáin 'descendant of Teimheán'.

People with this surname include:

- Thomas Teevan (attorney general) (1903–1976), Irish barrister and judge
- Thomas Teevan (Unionist politician) (1927–1954), Northern Ireland politician and lawyer
- Colin Teevan (born 1968), Irish playwright
- Craig Teevan (born 1970), Australian rugby player
- Jaime Teevan (born 1976), American computer scientist

== See also ==
- Tee-Van
