= Aindrias Ó Caoimh (attorney general) =

Irish judge and barrister

- Ó Caoimh at the end of the Lawless v Ireland case

Judge of the European Court of Justice
- In office 10 February 1975 – 13 July 1985
- Nominated by: Government of Ireland
- Appointed by: European Council

President of the High Court
- In office 11 May 1966 – 2 February 1975
- Nominated by: Government of Ireland
- Appointed by: Cearbhall Ó Dálaigh
- Preceded by: Cahir Davitt
- Succeeded by: Thomas Finlay

Judge of the High Court
- In office 11 May 1966 – 2 February 1975
- Nominated by: Government of Ireland
- Appointed by: Cearbhall Ó Dálaigh

Attorney General of Ireland
- In office 20 March 1957 – 15 March 1965
- Taoiseach: Éamon de Valera; Seán Lemass
- Preceded by: Patrick McGilligan
- Succeeded by: Colm Condon
- In office 30 January 1954 – 2 June 1954
- Taoiseach: Éamon de Valera
- Preceded by: Thomas Teevan
- Succeeded by: Patrick McGilligan

Personal details
- Born: 4 October 1912 Galway, Ireland
- Died: 30 December 1994 (aged 82) Ranelagh, Dublin, Ireland
- Party: Fianna Fáil
- Spouse: Sheila Ní Chuilleanáin (m. 1933)
- Children: 7, including Aindrias
- Relatives: Brian Ó Cuív (brother); Éamon Ó Cuív (nephew)
- Education: University College Dublin; King's Inns

Aindrias Micheál Ó Caoimh (4 October 1912 – 30 December 1994) was an Irish judge and barrister who served as a Judge of the European Court of Justice from 1975 to 1985, as the President of the High Court and a Judge of the High Court from 1966 to 1975, and the Attorney General of Ireland from January 1950 to June 1950 and 1957 to 1965.

== Personal life ==
Ó Caoimh was educated at O'Connell School and at University College Dublin.

He was a brother of Brian Ó Cuív and uncle of Éamon Ó Cuív. He and his wife Sheila had seven children. One of their children, Aindrias Ó Caoimh, was, like his father, appointed a member of the European Court of Justice in 2004. Ó Caoimh died at his home in Ranelagh in Dublin, and is buried in Glasnevin Cemetery.

Ó Caoimh's son, of the same name, is an Irish judge who served as a Judge of the European Court of Justice from 2004 to 2015, and as a Judge of the High Court from 1999 to 2004.

== Lawless v. Ireland ==
During his second term as Attorney General of Ireland he represented the Government of Ireland in Lawless v. Ireland (1957–1961), the first case before the European Court of Human Rights. This case was brought by Gerald Lawless, who was represented by Seán MacBride, a human rights lawyer. The case concerned the detention without trial of a suspected member of the IRA who claimed that Ireland had breached Articles 5, 6 and 7 of the European Convention of Human Rights that provide rights to liberty and security, fair trial and the principle of ‘no punishment without law’. The court found in favour of the Irish Government that no violation of the European Convention on Human Rights had taken place.

== Arms Trial ==
In September 1970, Ó Caoimh withdrew from the Arms Trial, with the result that the case had to be re-heard after six days of evidence had already been given.

== See also ==
- List of members of the European Court of Justice

Legal offices
Preceded by Thomas Teevan	Attorney General of Ireland; 1954–1954	Succeeded by Patrick McGilligan
Preceded by Patrick McGilligan	Attorney General of Ireland; 1957–1965	Succeeded by Colm Condon
