= Thomas McLaughlin (engineer) =

Dr. Thomas Anthony McLaughlin
- Born: 14 June 1896; Drogheda, Ireland
- Died: 28 May 1971 (aged 74); Spain
- Engineering career
- Discipline: Electrical Engineering
- Projects: Ardnacrusha power station, Electricity Supply Board

Thomas A. McLaughlin (14 June 1896 – 28 May 1971) was an Irish engineer from Drogheda, County Louth, and one of the key people in the Shannon hydroelectric scheme, an early icon of the Irish Free State. He then helped establish the Electricity Supply Board (ESB) which distributed electricity across Ireland and promoted the rural electrification of Ireland.

McLaughlin studied at University College Dublin and University College Galway. After qualifying as an electrical engineer, he started working for Siemens-Schuckert-Werke in Berlin in late 1922. He was impressed with the success of electrifying Pomerania, an area in Germany similar in scale to Ireland. McLaughlin promoted the concept of using the River Shannon as a basis for a hydro-electric and electrification scheme. He succeeded in having scheme adopted against intense political opposition.

== Origin and early career ==
Thomas McLaughlin was born in Drogheda to Peter McLaughin, an excise office, and Sarah McLoughlin née McCabe. He was educated at Synge Street CBS. He gained physics degrees (BSc and MSc) at University College Dublin and was appointed as an assistant lecturer in the physics department at University College Galway where he also studied electrical engineering and gained a BE and PhD

In 1922, McLaughlin obtained a post with Siemens-Schuckert in Berlin, which was particularly active in hydroelectric projects. Professor F.S. Rishworth, the professor of Civil Engineering at Galway, aroused McLaughlin's interest in the possibility of the Shannon electrification by giving him a copy of John Chaloner Smith's (son of John Chaloner Smith) prize-winning analysis of the average flows from large catchment areas in Ireland.

== The Shannon Scheme for electrifying Ireland ==
In Germany, he developed an ambitious proposal for using the 30m drop from Killaloe to Limerick, and persuaded the company to back it. Chaloner Smith's paper enabled him to overcome the objections to Theodore Steven's 1915 proposals for a Shannon scheme, which was based on inadequate data. He went to London and Ireland at the end of 1923 and met his college friend Patrick McGilligan who was now Minister for Industry and Commerce in the new Irish Free State government. McGilligan was enthusiastic about the idea.

It was an audacious project, for which the first stage would cost nearly £5m for a government whose annual budget was £25m. It would produce more electricity than the whole of Ireland was then producing. Distributing the electricity would require a country-wide grid that did not then exist. W. T. Cosgrave, President of the Executive Council (Prime Minister), proved harder to convince. He rejected the idea at the first meeting but did agree to meet McLaughlin again. At the second meeting, McLaughlin was accompanied by a senior director of Siemens. They were given permission to develop the project and by September 1924 McLaughlin had produced a report "The Electrification of the Irish Free State: The Shannon Scheme Developed by Siemens-Schuckert". The company had shown their faith in him by agreeing to face all costs if it was refused. If approved, it would be the biggest export order ever achieved by a German company.

At this point, furious arguments broke out, mainly from organisations in Dublin who had alternative plans centred on the River Liffey, closer to Dublin. Protest meetings were organised, debates were held in the Dáil and pamphlets were published against the idea. The Government commissioned four international experts to vet the scheme and they produced a report on the Shannon Scheme approving the centralised approach but suggesting a two-stage development. The Government saw a nation-building project and in April 1925 a bill was presented in the Daíl to implement the project. By August the contract had been signed. It was in two parts, with the first costing £5m and the second £6m. 30% of the cost of the first part was to implement a supply grid to Dublin and other centres.

When construction began, the 27-year-old McLaughlin served as managing director for Siemens in Ireland. He insisted that where qualified Irishmen were available they would be preferentially hired and that all unskilled labour would be Irish. At the peak, there were 5,000 employed on the project including around 150 German workers. The successful completion of the project in 1929 re-established Siemens on the world scene and led to other successful projects worldwide.

== Electricity Supply Board ==
In 1927 McLaughlin transferred to become executive director of the Electricity Supply Board which had been set up to manage the network he had created. Electricity consumption expanded dramatically after the Shannon Scheme was opened, just as the experts had predicted. During the 1940s he oversaw the extension of the network to rural areas.

He is often known as "The Founding Father of the ESB".

== Honours ==
The McLaughlin lecture is given annually at Engineers Ireland to commemorate McLaughlin.

He was the subject of a famous painting, The Key Men, by Sean Keating.

The Keating/McLaughlin award is given annually by the Royal Hibernian Academy.

== Other sources ==
- Duffy, Paul (Winter 2004), "The pre-history of the Shannon scheme", 18th–19th – Century History, 12 (4)
