= Aindrias Ó Caoimh (judge) =

Irish judge

Judge of the European Court of Justice
- In office 13 October 2004 – 7 October 2015
- Nominated by: Government of Ireland
- Appointed by: European Council

Judge of the High Court
- In office 21 July 1999 – 12 October 2004
- Nominated by: Government of Ireland
- Appointed by: Mary McAleese

Personal details
- Born: 5 May 1950 (age 76) Dublin, Ireland
- Parent: Aindrias Ó Caoimh (father)
- Relatives: Brian Ó Cuív (uncle); Éamon Ó Cuív (cousin)
- Education: University College Dublin; King's Inns

Aindrias Ó Caoimh (born 1 April 1950) is a retired Irish judge who has served as a Judge of the European Court of Justice from 2004 to 2015. He previously served as a Judge of the High Court from 1999 to 2004.

He is a son of Aindrias Ó Caoimh, who was twice Attorney General of Ireland and who was also a Judge of the European Court of Justice from 1974 until 1985.

He was educated at University College Dublin and King's Inns. He was called to the Bar in 1972 and became a Senior Counsel in 1994. He was a lecturer in European Law at King's Inns.

He was appointed to the European Court of Justice on 13 October 2004. Ó Caoimh seated as Judge-Rapporteur in several cases such as Deutsche Telekom AG v Commission and Dyson v Registrar of Trade Marks.

His uncle Brian Ó Cuív was the son-in-law of Éamon de Valera.

== See also ==
- List of members of the European Court of Justice
