= Shannon hydroelectric scheme =

Electricity generation project in County Clare, Ireland

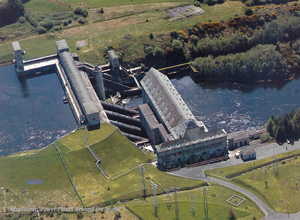

- Location within Ireland
- Country: Ireland
- Location: County Clare
- Purpose: Power
- Status: Operational
- Construction began: 1925 (101 years ago)
- Opening date: 1929 (97 years ago)
- Owner: ESB Group

Dam and spillways
- Impounds: River Shannon
- Height (foundation): 30 metres (98 ft)
- Width (crest): 100m

Reservoir
- Catchment area: 10,400 square kilometres (4,000 sq mi)

Ardnacrusha Power Station
- Coordinates: 52°42′20″N 8°36′46″W
- Type: Conventional
- Hydraulic head: 28.5–33 m (94–108 ft)
- Turbines: 4
- Installed capacity: 86 MW
- Capacity factor: 44%
- Annual generation: 332 GWh
- Website; ESB

The Shannon hydroelectric Scheme was a major development by the Irish Free State in the 1920s to harness the power of the River Shannon. Its product, the Ardnacrusha power plant, is a hydroelectric power station located near Ardnacrusha within County Clare approximately 2.4 kilometres (1.5 mi) from the Limerick border. It is Ireland's largest river hydroelectric scheme and is operated on a purpose built headrace connected to the River Shannon. The plant includes fish ladders so that returning fish, such as salmon, can climb the river safely past the power station.

Completed within 7 years of Irish independence in 1922 at a cost which was equivalent to one fifth of the Irish state's annual budget, the plant enabled an enormous surge in demand for electricity across the country and demonstrated the ability of the new government to develop during a difficult financial period. The plant was constructed by the German company Siemens-Schuckert, although much of the design was done by Irish engineers and Ireland provided most of the labour force. The scheme involved changes to the flow of the whole river, multiple dams and bridges and the construction of a national power grid.

The generating plant at Ardnacrusha is composed of three vertical-shaft Francis turbine generators (commissioned in 1929) and one vertical-shaft Kaplan turbine generator (commissioned in 1934) operating under an average head of 28.5 metres. The scheme originally was designed for six turbines, with four turbines fitted. The 85 MW of generating plant in Ardnacrusha was adequate to meet the electricity demand of the entire country in the early years. The full output equates to about 332,000 MWh generated on an annual basis. Ardnacrusha generates at 10.5 kilovolts (kV) but this is transformed to 38 kV for local distribution and to 110 kV for long distance transmission.

== Background ==
Shannon Water and Electric Power Act 1901
- Act of Parliament
- Parliament of the United Kingdom
- Long title: An Act for incorporating and conferring powers on the Shannon Water and Electric Power Company and for other purposes.
- Citation: 1 Edw. 7. c. cxxxvi

Dates
- Royal assent: 26 July 1901

The first plan to harness the Shannon's power between Lough Derg and Limerick was published in 1844 by Sir Robert Kane. Inspired by Nikola Tesla's 1896 project at Niagara Falls, "Frazer's Scheme" proposed a head-race canal ending at Doonass, and was sanctioned by the Shannon Water and Electric Power Act 1901 (1 Edw. 7. c. cxxxvi). This envisaged a seasonal scheme with a back-up steam turbine to generate electricity in the summer, but the overall cost was considered too great and the scheme was shelved. In 1902 S. F. Dick proposed a sharper fall at Doonass. The British Board of Trade appointed a committee in 1918 which approved proposals by Theodore Stevens and published a report in 1922. This envisaged altering upper lake levels to create extra storage of 10,000 million cubic feet, at a cost of £2.6m.

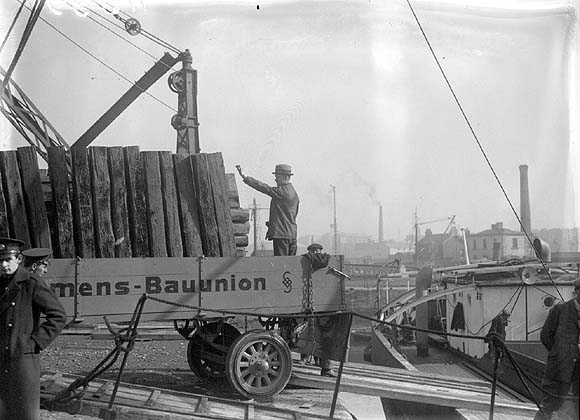
Siemens-Bauunion plant and machinery being unloaded at Limerick docks for Shannon hydro-electric scheme, 1925

At the end of 1923, the engineer Thomas McLaughlin approached the new Irish Free State's Minister for Industry and Commerce Patrick McGilligan with a proposal for a much more ambitious project. McLaughlin had started working for Siemens-Schuckert, a large German engineering firm, in late 1922, and his scheme would exploit the full height difference between Lough Allen and the sea. He drew on the analysis of 25 years of flow at the weir at Killaloe published by John Chaloner Smith, an engineer with the Commissioners of Public Works. McGilligan was enthusiastic although the President of the Executive Council, W. T. Cosgrave, was more cautious. The scheme was published by Siemens in September 1924 and the government appointed a team of experts from Norway and Switzerland to check its viability. It caused considerable political controversy as the cost of £5.2m was a large part of the new state's entire budget in 1925 of £25m and interests in Dublin preferred a more localised solution. But the experts supported the centralised solution which would require a distribution grid all over the country but recommended a two-stage implementation of the power generators. The government accepted this and by April 1925 had introduced the Shannon Electricity Act, 1925 in the Dáil.

== Construction ==
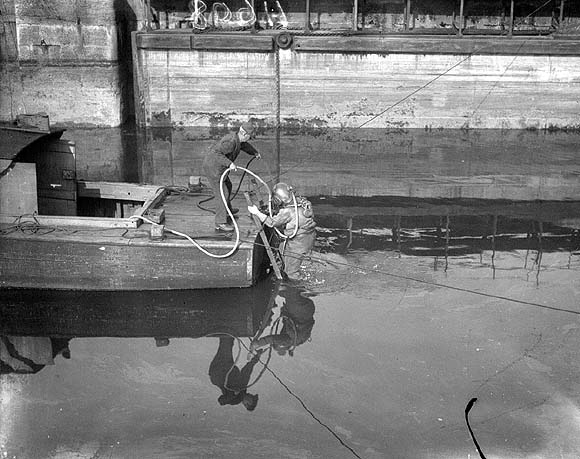
Diver involved in survey work for the Shannon Scheme, 1925

In 1925 Siemens started the works with Dr. McLaughlin as managing director and Professor Frank Sharman Rishworth, who took a leave of absence from University College Galway, as chief civil engineer. A completion time limit of three and a half years, with penalty clauses for failure of adherence to this limit, was written into the contract. Around 150 of the skilled workers and engineers on the power station were Germans. A camp was set up for the workers that included living quarters for 750 men and a dining room that seated 600. Initially employment for 700 was provided, whilst at its peak there were 5,200 employed during the construction phase, with this dropping back to 2,500 near completion.

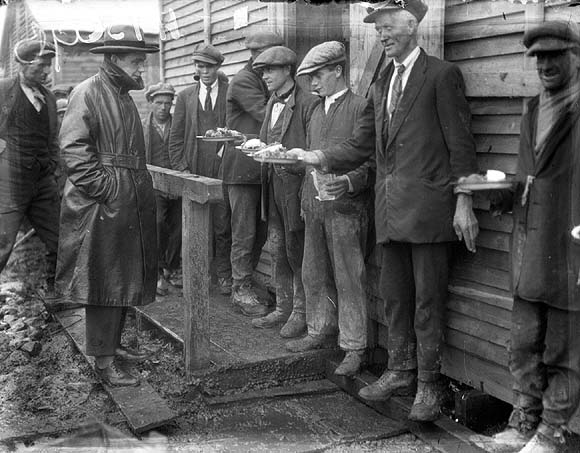
Canteen workers on the Shannon Scheme, 1928

Siemens had to import a vast array of machinery from Bremen and Hamburg and built a 96 km narrow gauge railway to transport workers and supplies around the site, which included 76 steam locomotives. The government made good the local roads which were in an appalling state. The headrace involved building embankments up to 25m high over a distance of 10 km and many unforeseen geological problems were encountered. 7.6 million cubic metres (9.9×10^{6} cu yd) of soil had to be moved and 1.2 million cubic metres (1.6×10^{6} cu yd) of rock. Four major bridges were built and nine rivers diverted as well as numerous streams. Three large Parsons turbines were installed at the base of the dam which could generate 35MW, more than the entire public supply of the time. In addition a supply network of 110kV power lines was installed to Dublin, Cork and other centres.

The construction project was not without controversy. Unskilled labourers were only paid agricultural wages producing strikes, national and governmental debate over wages, conditions, and spending over-runs. Despite this, there was a final cost overrun for Siemens of £150,000.

The site attracted a huge number of sightseers, transported by excursion trains from all parts of Ireland. By 1929 it reckoned that 250,000 spectators had been guided over the works.

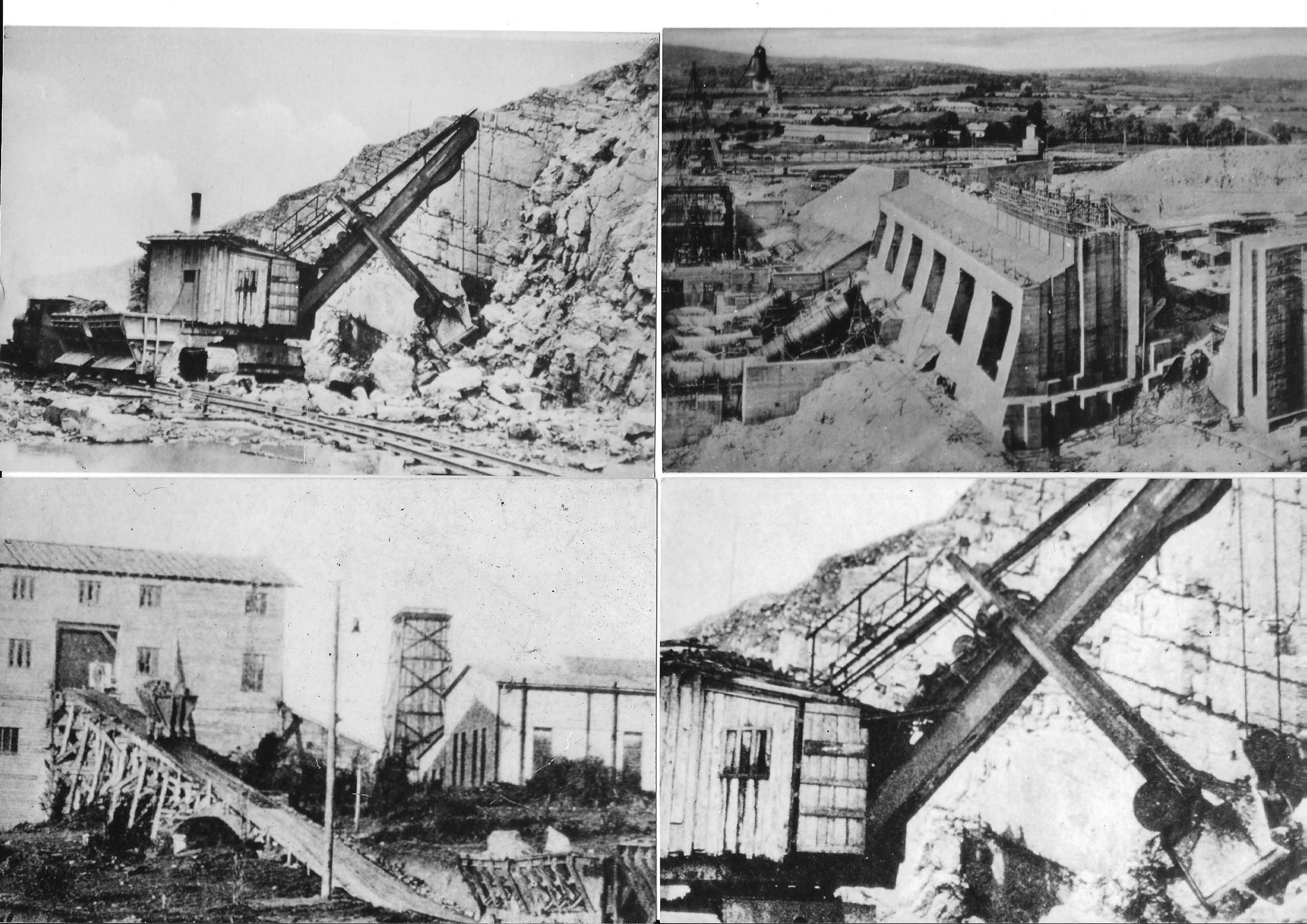
Ardnacrusha Power Station Construction

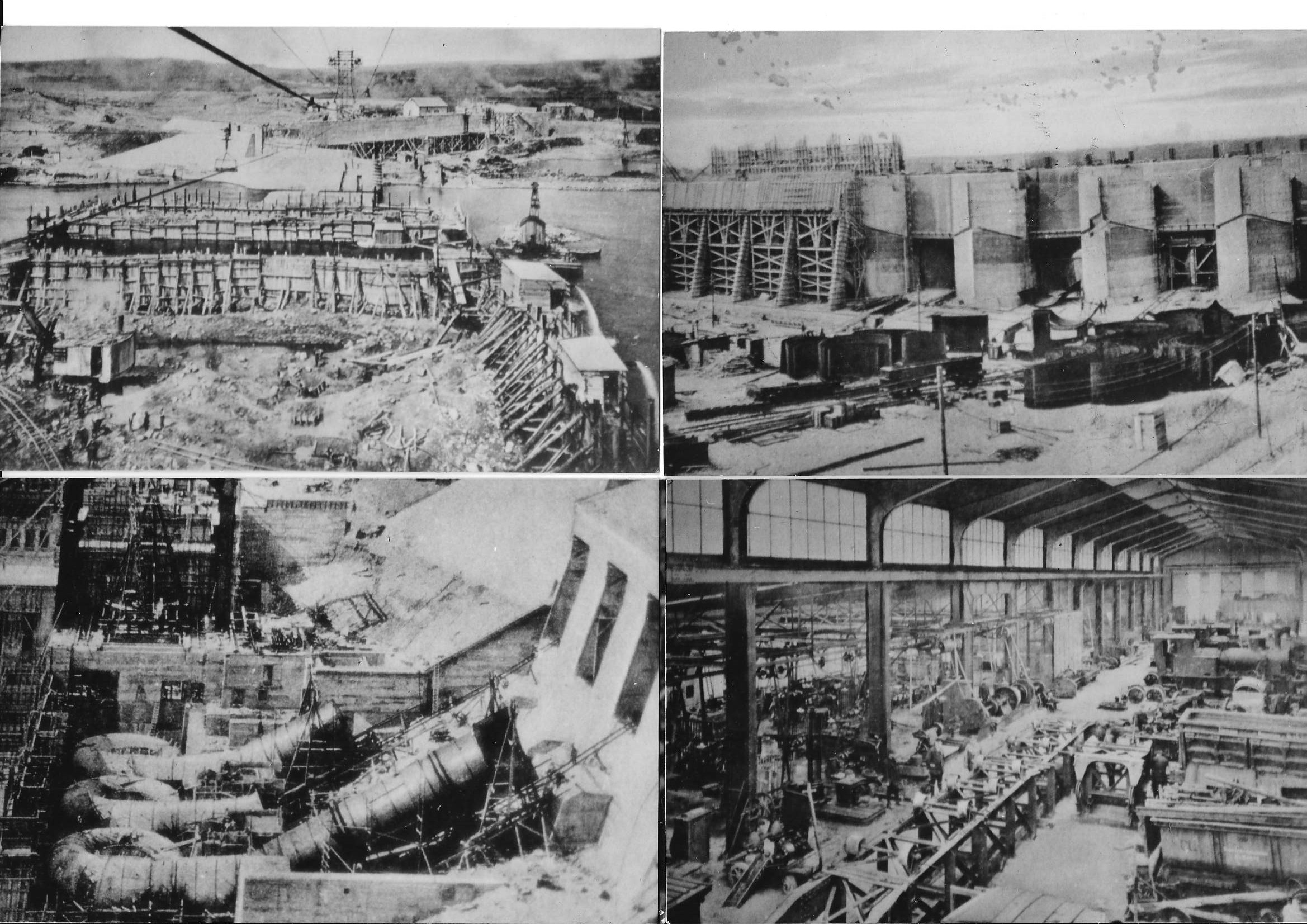
Construction of dam

== Electrifying Ireland ==
In 1927, the Electricity Supply Board (ESB) was established and took control of the scheme and electricity supply and generation generally. McLaughlin became the managing director.

The Shannon Scheme was officially opened at Parteen Weir on 22 July 1929. One of the largest engineering projects of its day, it served as a model for large-scale electrification projects worldwide. Operated by the ESB, it had an immediate impact on the social, economic and industrial development of Ireland. By 1935, it was producing 80% of Ireland's electricity. It continues to supply this power in the 21st century although its contribution is only 2% as of 2017. At the time, it was the largest hydroelectric station in the world, though this was soon superseded by the Hoover Dam, which commenced construction in 1930.

The London Financial Times was highly impressed with the result, commenting:

They have thrown on their shoulders the not easy task of breaking what is in reality an enormous inferiority complex and the Shannon Scheme is one - and probably the most vital - of their methods of doing it.

Within three years the demand for electricity in Ireland had expanded so much that stage 2 was initiated. Instead of the planned three extra penstocks, only one was used but it used a new 30 MW Kaplan turbine with seven blades which produces high efficiency on the relatively small head and therefore increased the capacity of the station to 75 MW by 1933. In 1937, the Poulaphouca Reservoir hydroelectric plant on the River Liffey in County Wicklow was constructed, adding another 35 MW.

In 2002, on the 75th anniversary of the plant, its historic status was recognised by the Institute of Electrical and Electronics Engineers, in partnership with the American Society of Civil Engineers, who marked the facility as an Engineering Milestone of the 20th century.

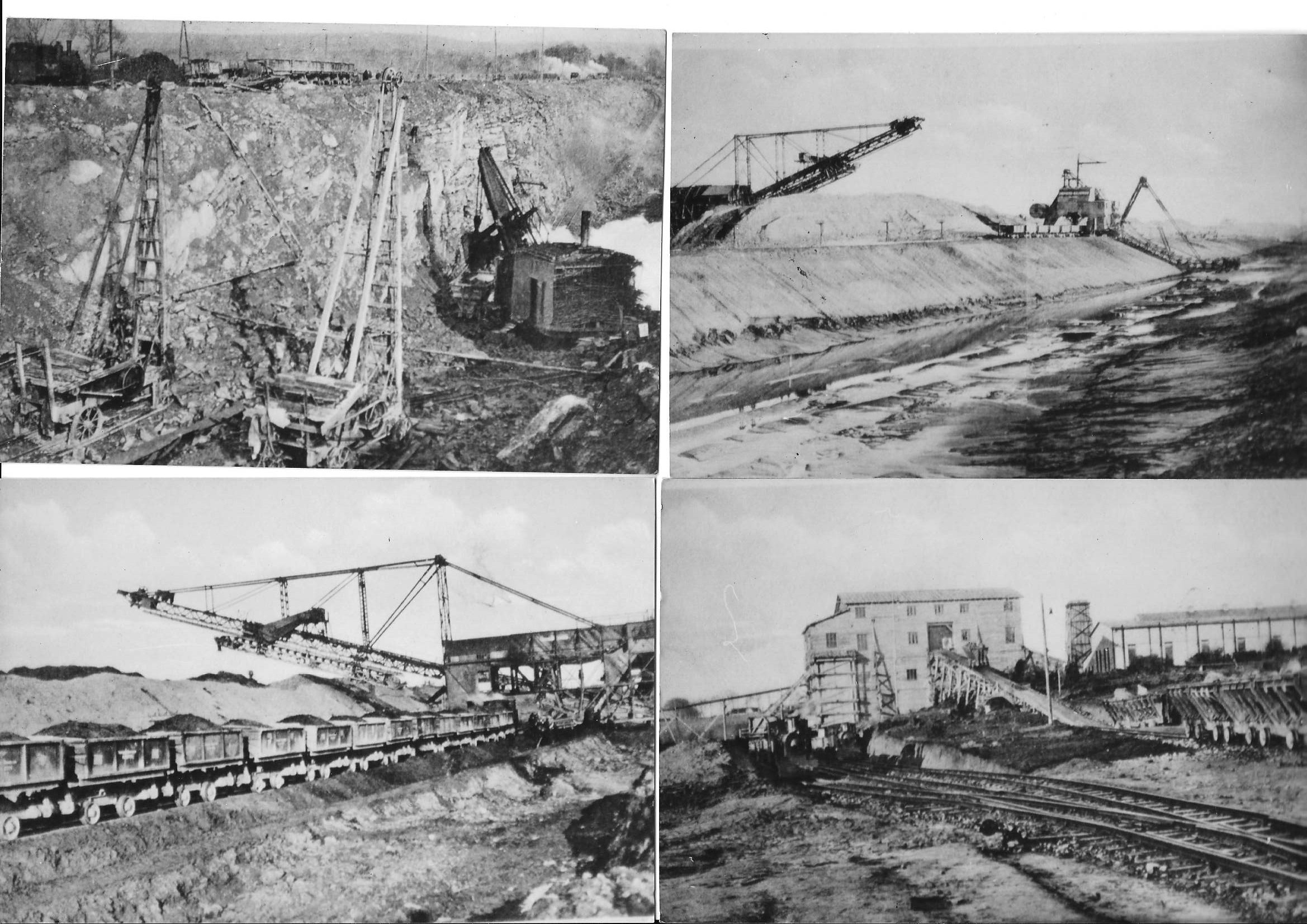
Canal construction

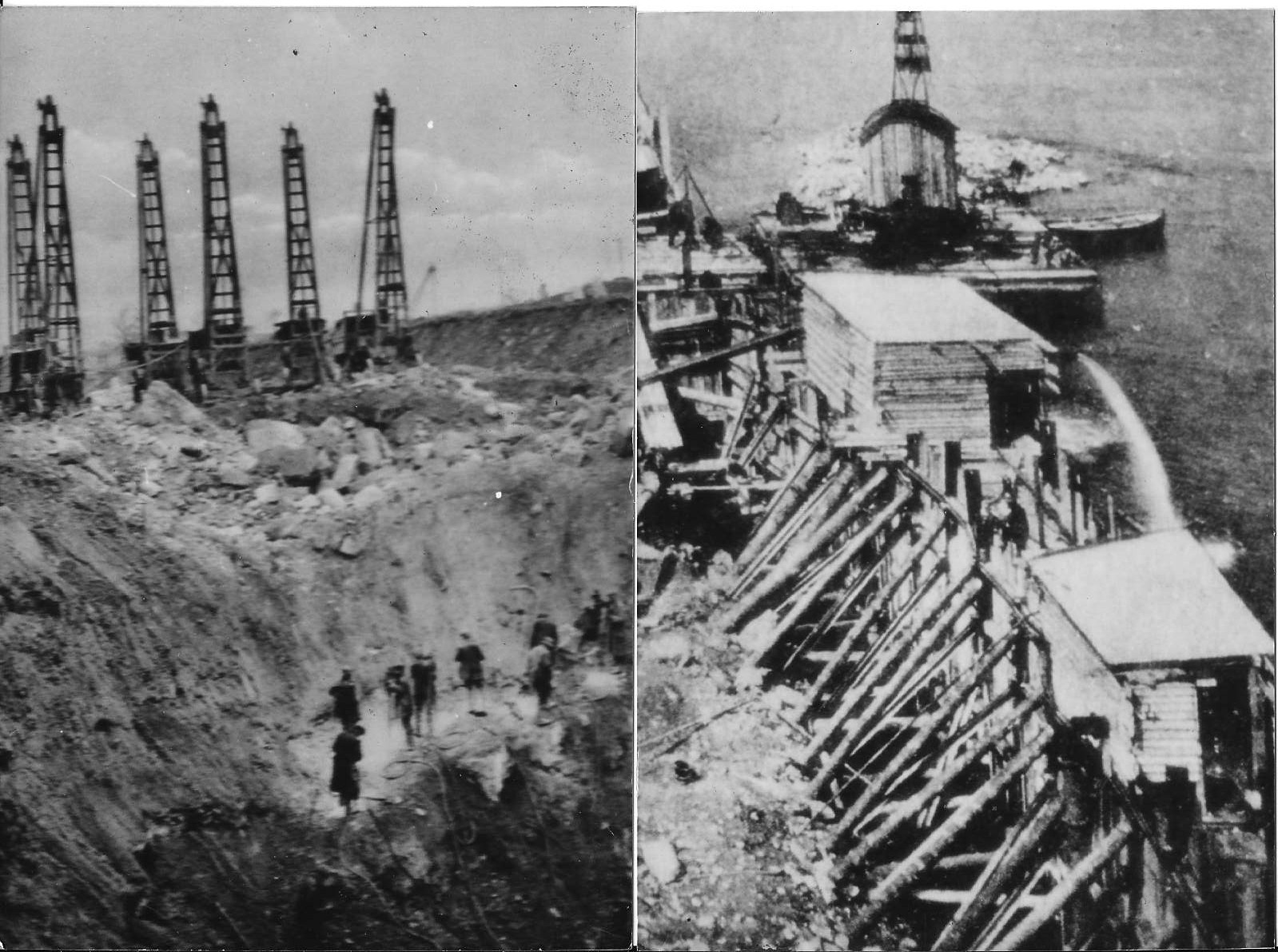
Head-race canal

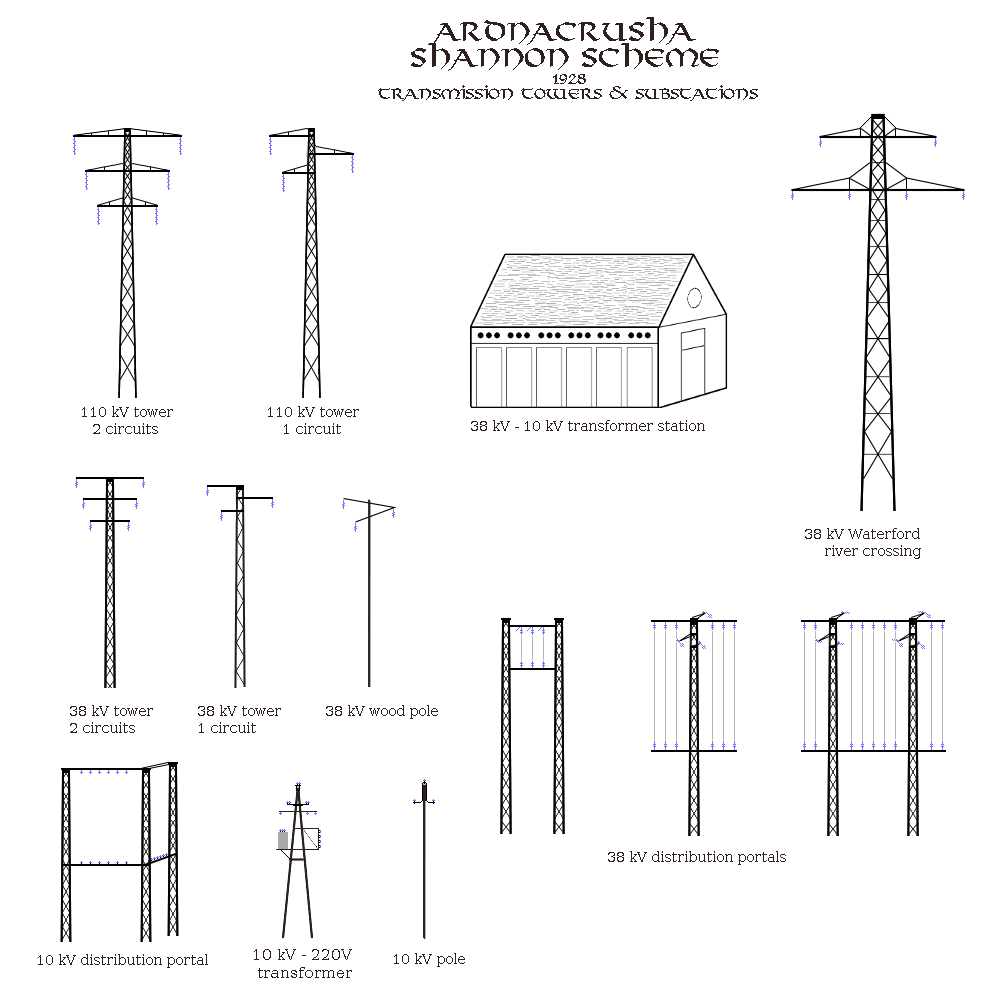
types of transmission towers used. Most of them were manufactured in Germany and transported to ireland

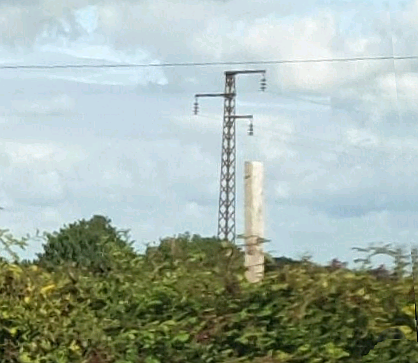
Typical 38 kV transmission tower for one circuit

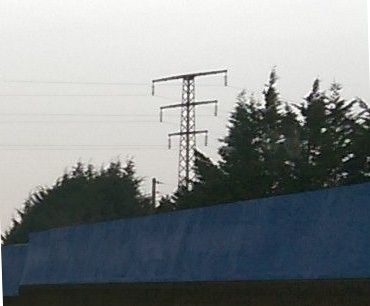
Typical 38 kV transmission tower for two circuits

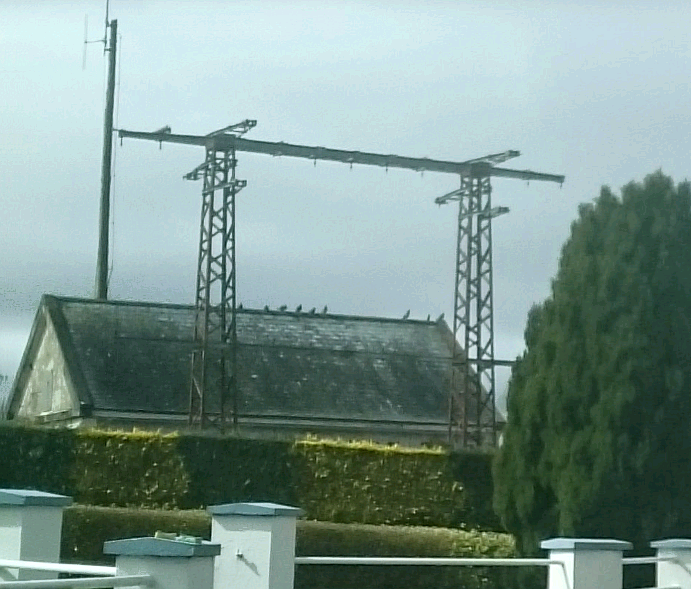
Electrical substation from 1929 with original gantry tower in front

== Environmental consequences ==
The opening of the scheme had, and continues to have, a significant environmental effect on the part of the Shannon bypassed by the head-race canal, from Parteen Villa north of O'Brien's Bridge to about a mile north of Limerick city. This length of river, especially that running past Castleconnell and the Falls of Doonass was in the nineteenth and early twentieth centuries world-famous for fishing, particularly salmon fishing. The diverting of water to the power station had a disastrous effect on this, for two main reasons: Initially, there was no fish pass at Ardnacrusha to allow the salmon to migrate further up the river; this was later rectified. Secondly, the reduction in water flow down the natural channel encouraged more fish to either migrate towards the head-race canal, or to the Mulkear River instead. The problem continues to this day, and the salmon fishing is no longer comparable with the period up to the 1920s, with stocks reduced by about 90%. The conservation status of the critically other species of native fish have also been hurt by the low water levels, such as the critically endangered eel.

=== Effects on the bypassed river channel ===
==== Reduction in water flow ====
Once opened, the great majority of the Shannon's water was diverted via the head-race canal to the power station. The ESB are required by law to allow 10 cubic meters per second (10 m^{3}/s) to flow down the natural channel. This is roughly what the natural flow would be during dry summer periods prior to the weir being built. All surplus water can be diverted for power generation. The maximum capacity of Ardnacrusha is approximately 400 m^{3}/s, 40 times that which is required to flow down the natural channel (although the power station does not necessarily run at this capacity at all times). For the first few years after the opening of the scheme, water was diverted to the power station only as necessary for the electricity demand at the time, and thus the impact on the river was not initially severe. However, as demand increased, more and more water was diverted, until eventually a situation was reached where, at all times, all available water was diverted for power generation, and the natural channel was permanently reduced to the minimum water flow allowed (except during extreme conditions). In exceptionally wet periods, the flow of water out of Lough Derg is greater than 400 m^{3}/s, and it is then necessary for the surplus to be released down the natural channel through Castleconnell. During these brief periods, the Falls of Doonass are temporarily restored to their former glory. How often this occurs depends on seasonal weather patterns: some years there is no increase above the minimum flow at all. This has led to a substantially dried-up riverbed. The most obvious result on the river south of Parteen Villa always being kept at summer levels is the silting of many of the old salmon pools, and the growth of trees and bushes in many parts of the former riverbed, thus significantly altering both the appearance and ecosystem of the river.

When built, Ardnacrusha had the capacity to supply power for the entire country. Currently, it accounts for around 2-3% of the ESB's overall power output. Given the small overall amount of power produced per cubic meter, there is a substantial case for increasing water flow to the natural channel, now that Ardnacrusha is producing so small a proportion of ESB's power. For example, increasing the flow of the river to 50 m^{3}/s would reduce Ardnacrusha's capacity by 1/10 (flow reduced by 40 m^{3}/s), or 8 megawatts; less than 0.3% of ESB's national capacity, whilst increasing the water flow to the natural channel 5-fold. This would have a major beneficial effect on the condition of the river south of O'Briens Bridge.

==== Navigation ====
The navigable section of water from the southern end of the Killaloe Canal to World's End, Castleconnell, was linked to Limerick via the lateral Plassey-Errina canal which had six locks. This became redundant with the construction of the new canal to Ardnacrusha, was dewatered and subsequently became derelict. Recently, several sections have been cleared, and it is now possible to walk from O'Briens Bridge to Errina lock along the old tow path. As there is no lock at Parteen weir linking the natural channel to Lough Derg, it is no longer possible for any watercraft to enter, by water, this part of the Shannon.

Navigation of the Shannon is now by the head-race canal which is 90 m (300 ft) wide. When all turbines are operating, the speed of the water is 1.5 m/s (3.4 mph) which can be challenging in both directions. This leads to the double lock at Ardnacrusha, which will take boats 32.2 m (106 ft) long and 6.1 m (20 ft) wide. The two locks have a combined drop of up to 34 m (112 ft).

==== Shannon Eel Management Programme ====
A trap and transport scheme is in force on the Shannon as part of an eel management programme following the discovery of a reduced eel population. This scheme ensures safe passage for young eels past Ardnacrusha.

=== Effects upriver from the scheme ===
==== Flooding ====
The maximum capacity of Ardnacrusha is approximately 400 m^{3}/s. As this is much greater than is available during summer months, during the early years of operation water was stored in the major lakes on the Shannon, Lough Derg, Lough Ree and Lough Allen because Ardnacrusha provided a significant contribution to meeting the nation's electricity requirements during that period. By holding these lakes at a higher than natural level, by means of weirs, water accumulated during the wet winter months could be released during much drier periods to maintain supply to the power station. Weirs already existed at Killaloe and Athlone to control lake levels in Lough Derg and Lough Ree respectively. Upon completion of Ardnacrusha, the weir at Athlone was modified and brought under ESB control, and a new weir built at the mouth of Lough Allen to further regulate water levels (the weir at Killaloe was removed, as Lough Derg's water level is now controlled by Parteen weir itself). In more recent decades Ardnacrusha's significance for electricity production has decreased, and water is no longer stored on the Shannon lakes for electricity generation.

==== Navigation ====
The scheme simplified navigation between Killaloe and Limerick, as watercraft need to traverse just one double lock at Ardnacrusha. The majority of the Killaloe canal was submerged under the new lake (the 'flooded section') south of Killaloe, allowing direct access to the head-race canal. The ESB is responsible for maintaining water levels for navigation throughout the Shannon to between predetermined limits, but they have the right to prioritise levels for electricity generation, should water shortages arise.

== See also ==
- River Shannon to Dublin pipeline
