= Tee-Van =

Tee-Van is a surname. Notable people with the surname include:

- Helen Damrosch Tee-Van (1893–1976), American illustrator
- John Tee-Van (1897–1967), American ichthyologist and zoologist

== See also ==
- Teevan
