= Síle de Valera =

Irish former politician (born 1954)

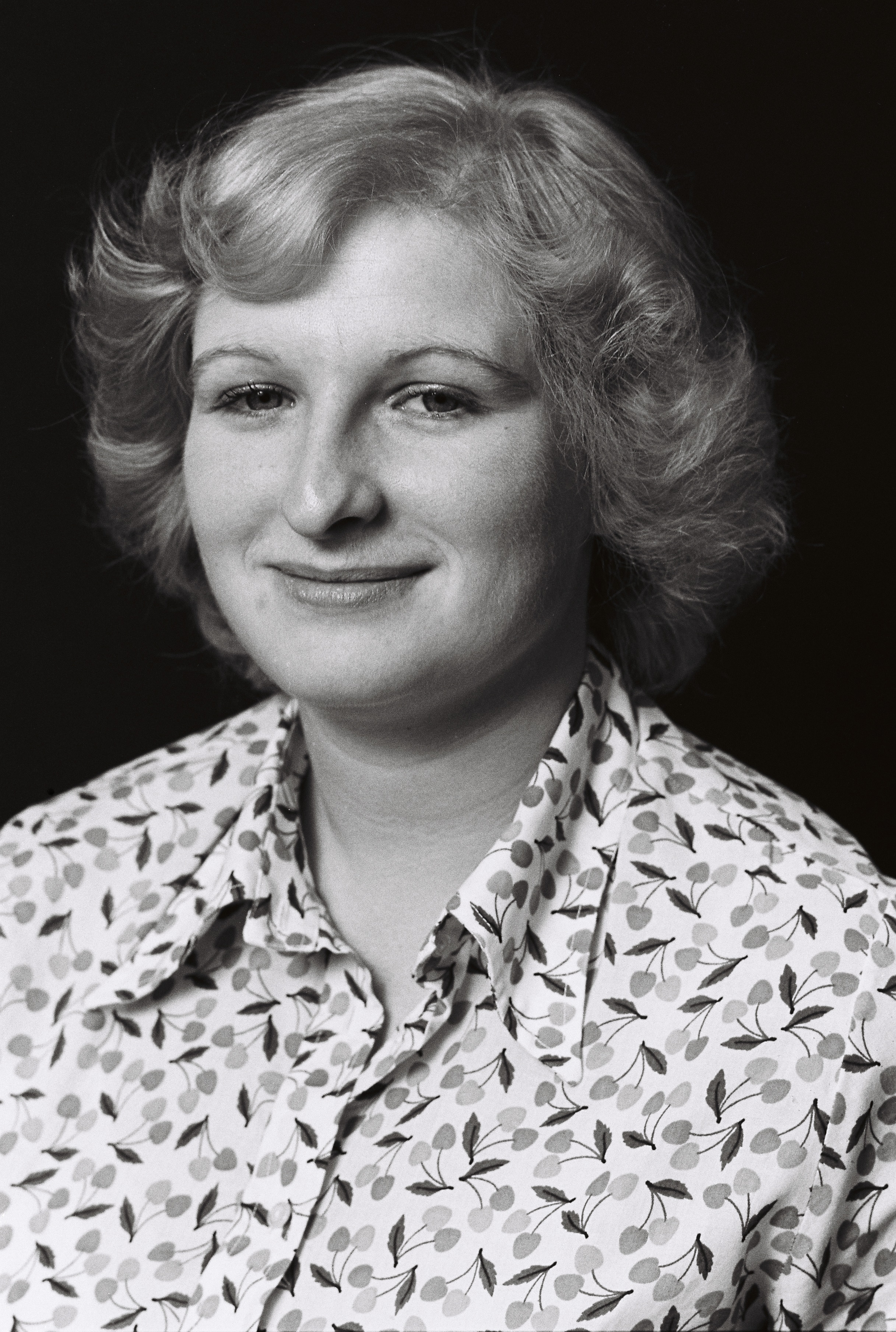
- De Valera in 1981

Minister of State
- 2002–2006: Education and Science

Minister for Arts, Heritage, Gaeltacht and the Islands
- In office 26 June 1997 – 6 June 2002
- Taoiseach: Bertie Ahern
- Preceded by: Michael D. Higgins
- Succeeded by: Éamon Ó Cuív

Teachta Dála
- In office February 1987 – May 2007
- Constituency: Clare
- In office June 1977 – June 1981
- Constituency: Dublin County Mid

Member of the European Parliament
- In office 1 June 1979 – 24 June 1984
- Constituency: Dublin

Personal details
- Born: 17 December 1954 (age 71) Clonskeagh, Dublin, Ireland
- Party: Fianna Fáil
- Relatives: Éamon de Valera (grandfather); Sinéad de Valera (grandmother)
- Education: University College Dublin

Síle de Valera (Irish: [ˈʃiːlʲə dʲɛ ˈwalʲəɾʲə]; born 17 December 1954) is an Irish former Fianna Fáil politician who served as a Minister of State from 2002 to 2006 and as Minister for Arts, Heritage, Gaeltacht and the Islands from 1997 to 2002. She served as a Teachta Dála (TD) from 1977 to 1981 and from 1987 to 2007. She was a Member of the European Parliament (MEP) for the Dublin constituency from 1979 to 1984.

== Early and personal life ==
Síle de Valera was born in 1954, in Dublin, Ireland to Terence de Valera (1922–2007), the youngest child of Éamon de Valera, and his wife Phyllis Blake (1920–2002). She has a younger sister. She was educated at Loreto College, Foxrock and at University College Dublin, where she qualified as a career guidance teacher. De Valera's grandfather, Éamon de Valera, was the founder of Fianna Fáil, a Taoiseach and the third President of Ireland. She is a niece of Vivion de Valera, a former TD, and is a first cousin of Éamon Ó Cuív, a TD who succeeded her as a minister.

== Political career ==
De Valera was first elected to Dáil Éireann in the Fianna Fáil landslide victory at the 1977 general election. She was elected for the Dublin County Mid constituency, which included the Tallaght area of County Dublin, being the youngest TD elected at that election. In June 1979, she was elected to the European Parliament for a five-year term. Later that year she was one of the Fianna Fáil TDs who criticised the policies of Taoiseach Jack Lynch in relation to Northern Ireland, and was a prominent supporter of Charles Haughey, who succeeded him as Taoiseach in December 1979. She was highly critical of Margaret Thatcher and the British Government, and became a noted supporter of the Anti H-Block movement. She called on nationalists to vote for Bobby Sands in the 1981 by-election, which he won. She also controversially called on Fianna Fáil voters to give preference votes for Anti H-Block candidates in the 1981 general election.

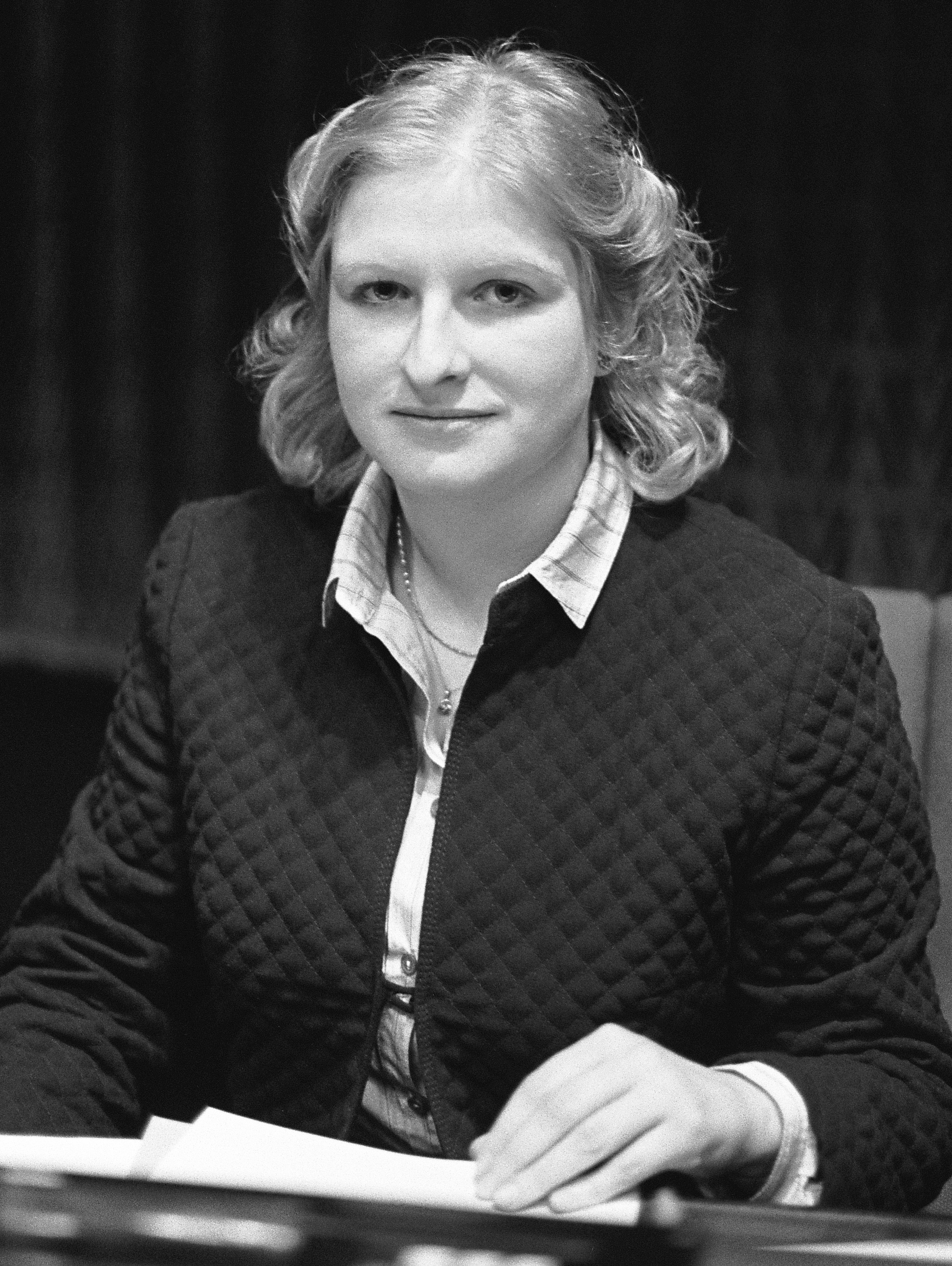
de Valera sitting in the European Parliament in May 1981

She held her Dáil seat until the 1981 general election, when the constituency boundaries were redrawn. She sought re-election in the new constituency of Dublin South. This caused tension within the local Fianna Fáil party, for one of the other candidates, Séamus Brennan, was a prominent opponent of Haughey. De Valera narrowly failed to be elected, losing to another Fianna Fáil candidate, Niall Andrews. She contested the constituency again at the February 1982 general election, but saw her vote drop, and once again failed to be elected.

At the November 1982 general election she sought election to the Clare constituency, where one of the sitting TDs, Bill Loughnane—a fellow supporter of Haughey—had died. Clare was the constituency her grandfather Éamon de Valera had represented from 1917 to 1959. Again, she narrowly failed to be elected, but remained living in the constituency, and at the 1987 general election she was elected a TD for Clare. She was re-elected there at every election until her retirement in 2007.

De Valera resigned briefly from Fianna Fáil in 1993, due to the removal of the 'stopover' at Shannon Airport. She was persuaded to rejoin the party in 1994 by its new leader, Bertie Ahern; he then appointed her to the opposition front bench. In 1997, she was appointed as Minister for Arts, Heritage, Gaeltacht and the Islands. She introduced broadcasting legislation in 1999 to ensure that the public could continue to watch the most important sporting events on ordinary television. A speech given by de Valera in Boston about her fear of closer EU integration stimulated a debate on whether Ireland's economic and social values were closer to those of the USA or the EU, "Boston or Berlin". She lost her place in the cabinet in 2002, but was appointed as Minister of State at the Department of Education and Science, with special responsibility for Adult Education, Youth Affairs and Educational Disadvantage.

On 11 November 2005, she announced her intention to retire at the following election. She resigned as Minister of State on 8 December 2006, and was succeeded by a member of another Irish political family, Seán Haughey.

== See also ==
- Families in the Oireachtas

Political offices
Preceded by Michael D. Higgins	Minister for Arts, Heritage, Gaeltacht and the Islands; 1997–2002	Succeeded by Éamon Ó Cuív
Preceded by Willie O'Dea	Minister of State at the Department of Education and Science; 2002–2006	Succeeded by Seán Haughey
Honorary titles
Preceded by Enda Kenny	Baby of the Dáil; 1977–1979	Succeeded by Myra Barry

Dáil	Election	Deputy (Party)	Deputy (Party)	Deputy (Party)
21st	1977	Seán Walsh (FF)	Síle de Valera (FF)	Larry McMahon (FG)
22nd	1981	Constituency abolished		

Dáil	Election	Deputy (Party)	Deputy (Party)	Deputy (Party)	Deputy (Party)	Deputy (Party)
2nd	1921	Éamon de Valera (SF)	Brian O'Higgins (SF)	Seán Liddy (SF)	Patrick Brennan (SF)	4 seats 1921–1923
3rd	1922	Éamon de Valera (AT-SF)	Brian O'Higgins (AT-SF)	Seán Liddy (PT-SF)	Patrick Brennan (PT-SF)	4 seats 1921–1923
4th	1923	Éamon de Valera (Rep)	Brian O'Higgins (Rep)	Conor Hogan (FP)	Patrick Hogan (Lab)	Eoin MacNeill (CnaG)
5th	1927 (Jun)	Éamon de Valera (FF)	Patrick Houlihan (FF)	Thomas Falvey (FP)	Patrick Hogan (Lab)	Patrick Kelly (CnaG)
6th	1927 (Sep)	Éamon de Valera (FF)	Patrick Houlihan (FF)	Martin Sexton (FF)	Patrick Hogan (Lab)	Patrick Kelly (CnaG)
7th	1932	Éamon de Valera (FF)	Seán O'Grady (FF)	Martin Sexton (FF)	Patrick Hogan (Lab)	Patrick Burke (CnaG)
8th	1933	Éamon de Valera (FF)	Seán O'Grady (FF)	Patrick Houlihan (FF)	Patrick Hogan (Lab)	Patrick Burke (CnaG)
9th	1937	Éamon de Valera (FF)	Seán O'Grady (FF)	Thomas Burke (FP)	Patrick Hogan (Lab)	Patrick Burke (FG)
10th	1938	Éamon de Valera (FF)	Seán O'Grady (FF)	Thomas Burke (FP)	Peter O'Loghlen (FF)	Patrick Burke (FG)
11th	1943	Éamon de Valera (FF)	Seán O'Grady (FF)	Thomas Burke (FP)	Patrick Hogan (Lab)	Patrick Burke (FG)
12th	1944	Éamon de Valera (FF)	Seán O'Grady (FF)	Thomas Burke (FP)	Peter O'Loghlen (FF)	Patrick Burke (FG)
12th	1945 by-election	Éamon de Valera (FF)	Seán O'Grady (FF)	Thomas Burke (FP)	Peter O'Loghlen (FF)	Patrick Shanahan (FF)
13th	1948	Éamon de Valera (FF)	Seán O'Grady (FF)	Thomas Burke (FP)	Patrick Hogan (Lab)	4 seats 1948–1969
14th	1951	Éamon de Valera (FF)	Patrick Hillery (FF)	William Murphy (FG)	Patrick Hogan (Lab)	4 seats 1948–1969
15th	1954	Éamon de Valera (FF)	Patrick Hillery (FF)	William Murphy (FG)	Patrick Hogan (Lab)	4 seats 1948–1969
16th	1957	Éamon de Valera (FF)	Patrick Hillery (FF)	William Murphy (FG)	Patrick Hogan (Lab)	4 seats 1948–1969
16th	1959 by-election	Seán Ó Ceallaigh (FF)	Patrick Hillery (FF)	William Murphy (FG)	Patrick Hogan (Lab)	4 seats 1948–1969
17th	1961	Seán Ó Ceallaigh (FF)	Patrick Hillery (FF)	William Murphy (FG)	Patrick Hogan (Lab)	4 seats 1948–1969
18th	1965	Seán Ó Ceallaigh (FF)	Patrick Hillery (FF)	William Murphy (FG)	Patrick Hogan (Lab)	4 seats 1948–1969
18th	1968 by-election	Seán Ó Ceallaigh (FF)	Patrick Hillery (FF)	Sylvester Barrett (FF)	Patrick Hogan (Lab)	4 seats 1948–1969
19th	1969	Frank Taylor (FG)	Patrick Hillery (FF)	Sylvester Barrett (FF)	3 seats 1969–1981	
20th	1973	Frank Taylor (FG)	Brendan Daly (FF)	Sylvester Barrett (FF)	3 seats 1969–1981	
21st	1977	Frank Taylor (FG)	Brendan Daly (FF)	Sylvester Barrett (FF)	3 seats 1969–1981	
22nd	1981	Madeleine Taylor (FG)	Brendan Daly (FF)	Sylvester Barrett (FF)	Bill Loughnane (FF)	4 seats since 1981
23rd	1982 (Feb)	Donal Carey (FG)	Brendan Daly (FF)	Sylvester Barrett (FF)	Bill Loughnane (FF)	4 seats since 1981
24th	1982 (Nov)	Donal Carey (FG)	Brendan Daly (FF)	Sylvester Barrett (FF)	Madeleine Taylor-Quinn (FG)	4 seats since 1981
25th	1987	Donal Carey (FG)	Brendan Daly (FF)	Síle de Valera (FF)	Madeleine Taylor-Quinn (FG)	4 seats since 1981
26th	1989	Donal Carey (FG)	Brendan Daly (FF)	Síle de Valera (FF)	Madeleine Taylor-Quinn (FG)	4 seats since 1981
27th	1992	Donal Carey (FG)	Moosajee Bhamjee (Lab)	Síle de Valera (FF)	Tony Killeen (FF)	4 seats since 1981
28th	1997	Donal Carey (FG)	Brendan Daly (FF)	Síle de Valera (FF)	Tony Killeen (FF)	4 seats since 1981
29th	2002	Pat Breen (FG)	James Breen (Ind.)	Síle de Valera (FF)	Tony Killeen (FF)	4 seats since 1981
30th	2007	Pat Breen (FG)	Joe Carey (FG)	Timmy Dooley (FF)	Tony Killeen (FF)	4 seats since 1981
31st	2011	Pat Breen (FG)	Joe Carey (FG)	Timmy Dooley (FF)	Michael McNamara (Lab)	4 seats since 1981
32nd	2016	Pat Breen (FG)	Joe Carey (FG)	Timmy Dooley (FF)	Michael Harty (Ind.)	4 seats since 1981
33rd	2020	Violet-Anne Wynne (SF)	Joe Carey (FG)	Cathal Crowe (FF)	Michael McNamara (Ind.)	4 seats since 1981
34th	2024	Donna McGettigan (SF)	Joe Cooney (FG)	Cathal Crowe (FF)	Timmy Dooley (FF)	4 seats since 1981
