= Dyson v Registrar of Trade Marks =

Decision of the European Court of Justice

- European Court of Justice

Decided 25 January 2007
- Full case name: Dyson Ltd v Registrar of Trade Marks.
- Case: C-321/03
- CelexID: 62003CC0321
- ECLI: ECLI:EU:C:2007:51
- Case type: Reference for a preliminary ruling

Ruling
- Article 2 of First Council Directive 89/104/EEC of 21 December 1988 to approximate the laws of the Member States relating to trade marks is to be interpreted as meaning that the subject-matter of an application for trade mark registration, such as that lodged in the main proceedings, which relates to all the conceivable shapes of a transparent bin or collection chamber forming part of the external surface of a vacuum cleaner, is not a ‘sign’ within the meaning of that provision and therefore is not capable of constituting a trade mark within the meaning thereof.

Court composition
- Judge-Rapporteur; Aindrias Ó Caoimh (judge)
- Advocate General; Philippe Léger

Dyson v Registrar of Trade Marks (2007) C-321/03 was a decision of the Court of Justice of the European Union concerning the concept of a sign of which a trade mark may consist. In particular, the case covers a preliminary ruling examining the interpretation of Article 3(3) of First Council Directive 89/104/EEC of 21 December 1988, which is now the Trade Marks Directive.

== Facts ==
Since 1993, the British vacuum-cleaner manufacturer Dyson has manufactured and marketed the Dual Cyclone vacuum cleaner, which collects dirt and dust in a transparent plastic container instead of a bag.

On 10 December 1996, Dyson lodged an application at the Registry for the registration of several trade marks under Class 9 of the Nice Classifiaction, which is ‘[a]pparatus for cleaning, polishing and shampooing floors and carpets; vacuum cleaners; carpet shampooers; floor polishers; parts and fittings for all the aforesaid goods’. That application was assigned to Dyson on 5 February 2002. Dyson described the 3D-shape trade marks as ‘[...] a transparent bin or collection chamber forming part of the external surface of a vacuum cleaner as shown in the representation’.

The application was rejected by the Registrar, upon which Dyson brought an appeal against that decision before the High Court of Justice of England and Wales, Chancery Division.

Before the High Court, questions arose about the distinctive character of marks and about descriptive marks, which are two grounds for refusing trade mark appliactions. This has led to the High Court staying the proceedings and referring the following questions to the European Court of Justice:

1. In a situation where an applicant has used a sign (which is not a shape) which consists of a feature which has a function and which forms part of the appearance of a new kind of article, and the applicant has, until the date of application, had a de facto monopoly in such articles, is it sufficient, in order for the sign to have acquired a distinctive character within the meaning of Article 3(3) of [the Directive], that a significant proportion of the relevant public has by the date of application for registration come to associate the relevant goods bearing the sign with the applicant and no other manufacturer? 2. If that is not sufficient, what else is needed in order for the sign to have acquired a distinctive character and, in particular, is it necessary for the person who has used the sign to have promoted it as a trade mark?’

== Judgment ==
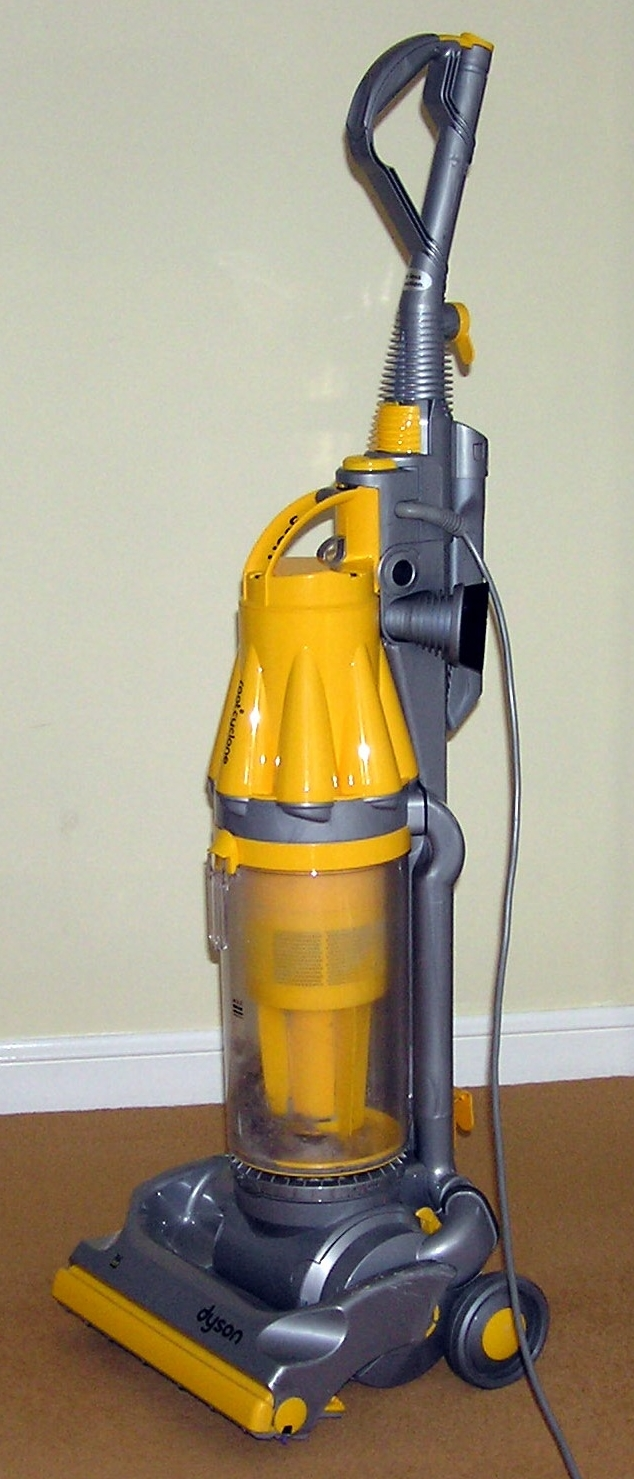
Dual cyclone of a Dyson DC07

The two questions of the High Court concern the distinctiveness of a trade mark, a ground to refuse a trade mark application for when the mark cannot distinguish the goods and services of a company from those of another. However, the Court of Justice chose to discuss the subject matter of a trade mark, in other words the signs of which a trade mark even may consist of. With slightly ignoring the questions of distincitveness, the Court of Justice focused itself on the question of the applied mark could in fact even be a sign. The reason was that if the mark is not a sign, and thus failing to comply with Article 2 of the Directive, there would be no need to evaluate the grounds of Article 3, such as distinctiveness.

According to Article 2 and settled case law (C‑299/99 Philips [2002]; C‑273/00 Sieckmann [2002]; C‑104/01 Libertel [2003]; and C‑49/02 Heidelberger Bauchemie [2004]), the Court says that there are three conditions for the subject matter of a trade mark:

1. The subject matter must be a sign;

2. The sign must be capable of being represented graphically;

3. The sign must be capable of distinguishing the goods or services of one undertaking from those of other undertakings.

The Court rejected the idea that the subject matter of Dyson's applied mark is a sign, as it covered the concept all conceivable shapes of transparent collecting bins, and consequently the idea that it is capable of being perceived visually.

"In the present case, it is common ground that the subject-matter of the application in the main proceedings is not a particular type of transparent collecting bin forming part of the external surface of a vacuum cleaner, but rather, in a general and abstract manner, all the conceivable shapes of such a collecting bin."

Because the subject matter doesn't fulfill all conditions, the Court concluded that the applied for mark could not be capable of constituting a trade mark. If it did, the mark could give Dyson a competitive advantage by excluding competitors from using any form of transparent collecting bin.
