= Patrick McGilligan (Irish nationalist politician) =

Politician (1847 - 1917)

Patrick McGilligan (1847–1917) was an Irish nationalist politician. He was MP for South Fermanagh from 1892 until 1895. McGilligan was a Coleraine businessman who was on the Irish National Federation, the anti-Parnell side of the Irish Parliamentary Party, after the split in 1890.

McGilligan had twelve children, one son also called Patrick served as a TD and cabinet minister in Dáil Éireann.

== Sources ==
- Hansard 1803–2005: contributions in Parliament by Patrick McGilligan
- The First British Commonwealth: Essays in Honour of Nicholas Mansergh, London, Frank Cass and Company Limited, 1980, page 118.

Parliament of the United Kingdom
Preceded by Henry Campbell	Member of Parliament for South Fermanagh; 1892–1895	Succeeded by Jeremiah Jordan
