= Patrick Crumley =

Patrick Crumley (1860 – 17 November 1922) was an Irish Nationalist Member of the Parliament of the United Kingdom for South Fermanagh, 1910–18.

Crumley was a cattle trader. He was for many years vice-chairman of the Enniskillen Board of Guardians. He was also a member of Enniskillen Urban Council and of Fermanagh County Council. He was elected unopposed for South Fermanagh at the general election of December 1910, succeeding Jeremiah Jordan. In the 1918 Irish general election, an electoral pact brokered by Cardinal Logue, after nominations closed, allocated South Fermanagh to Sinn Féin who won the seat with 6,673 votes to the Unionist's 4,524.

== Notes ==
Parliament of the United Kingdom
Preceded by Jeremiah Jordan	Member of Parliament for South Fermanagh; December 1910 – 1918	Succeeded by Seán O'Mahony
