= South Fermanagh (UK Parliament constituency) =

UK parliamentary constituency in Ireland, 1885–1922

- Former county constituency for the House of Commons
- County: County Fermanagh

1885–1922
- Seats: 1
- Created from: County Fermanagh
- Replaced by: Fermanagh and Tyrone

South Fermanagh was a parliament constituency in Ireland which returned one Member of Parliament to the House of Commons of the United Kingdom on the electoral system of first past the post from 1885 to 1922.

== Politics ==
The constituency was a nationalist inclined one, but with a significant unionist minority. The Irish Parliamentary Party held the seat from 1885 to 1918.

At the 1918 general election, Sinn Féin had a limited electoral pact in Ulster with the Nationalists to avoid splitting the vote in seats Unionists might win. In South Monaghan, Sinn Féin benefited from the pact, as nationalists were advised to vote for Seán O'Mahony rather than their own candidate (the incumbent MP). O'Mahony was a prisoner interned in Lincoln Jail at the time of the election. He was the only Sinn Féin candidate elected in the six counties that became Northern Ireland who was not also returned for a seat in the rest of Ireland. After his release in 1919, he served in the Dáil Éireann.

== History and boundaries ==
From 1801 to 1885, County Fermanagh returned two MPs to the House of Commons of the United Kingdom sitting at the Palace of Westminster, with separate representation for the parliamentary borough of Enniskillen. Under the Redistribution of Seats Act 1885, the parliamentary county was divided into the divisions of North Fermanagh and South Fermanagh. Enniskillen ceased to exist as a parliamentary borough.

South Fermanagh was defined as:

In County Fermanagh, the baronies of Clanawley, Clankelly, Coole, Knockninny, and Magherastephana.

It was not affected by the Redistribution of Seats (Ireland) Act 1918. At the 1918 general election, Sinn Féin contested on an election manifesto with an abstentionist pledge that instead of taking its seats at Westminster, it would establish an assembly in Dublin. All MPs elected to Irish seats were invited to participate in the First Dáil convened in January 1919, but no members outside of Sinn Féin did so.

The Government of Ireland Act 1920 established the Parliament of Northern Ireland, which came into operation in 1921. The representation of Northern Ireland at Westminster was reduced from 30 MPs to 13 MPs, taking effect at the 1922 United Kingdom general election. At Westminster, North Fermanagh, South Fermanagh, North-East Tyrone, North-West Tyrone and South Tyrone were combined to form the two-seat county constituency of Fermanagh and Tyrone. An eight-seat constituency of Fermanagh and Tyrone was created for the House of Commons of Northern Ireland, which formed the basis in republican theory for representation in the Second Dáil.

== Members of Parliament ==
Election	MP	Party
1885	Henry Campbell (Note: Campbell remained with the Parnellite Irish National League on the split of the Irish Parliamentary Party in 1891. He retired at the 1892 election.)	Irish National League
1886	Henry Campbell	Irish National League
1892	Patrick McGilligan	Irish National Federation
1895	Jeremiah Jordan	Irish National Federation
1900	Jeremiah Jordan	Irish Parliamentary
1906	Jeremiah Jordan	Irish Parliamentary
Jan 1910	Jeremiah Jordan	Irish Parliamentary
Dec 1910	Patrick Crumley	Irish Parliamentary
1918	Seán O'Mahony	Sinn Féin
1922	Constituency abolished; see Fermanagh and Tyrone	

== Elections ==
=== Elections in the 1880s ===
1885 general election: South Fermanagh
Party	Candidate	Votes	%	±%
Irish Parliamentary	Henry Campbell	3,574	62.1	
Irish Conservative	Frank Brooke	2,181	37.9	
Majority		1,393	24.2	
Turnout		5,755	84.0	
Registered electors		6,855		
Irish Parliamentary win (new seat)				

1886 general election: South Fermanagh
Party	Candidate	Votes	%	±%
Irish Parliamentary	Henry Campbell	3,553	60.5	−1.6
Irish Conservative	Frank Brooke	2,320	39.5	+1.6
Majority		1,233	21.0	−3.2
Turnout		5,873	85.7	+1.7
Registered electors		6,855		
Irish Parliamentary hold		Swing	−1.6	

=== Elections in the 1890s ===
1892 general election: South Fermanagh
Party	Candidate	Votes	%	±%
Irish National Federation	Patrick McGilligan	2,941	55.9	−4.6
Liberal Unionist	Arthur St George Patton	2,320	44.1	+4.6
Majority		621	11.8	−9.2
Turnout		5,261	90.9	+5.2
Registered electors		5,788		
Irish National Federation gain from Irish Parliamentary		Swing	−4.6	

1895 general election: South Fermanagh
Party	Candidate	Votes	%	±%
Irish National Federation	Jeremiah Jordan	2,792	57.1	+1.2
Irish Unionist	Arthur Douglas Brooke	2,096	42.9	−1.2
Majority		696	14.2	+2.4
Turnout		4,888	88.6	−2.3
Registered electors		5,519		
Irish National Federation hold		Swing	+1.2	

=== Elections in the 1900s ===
1900 general election: South Fermanagh
Party	Candidate	Votes	%	±%
Irish Parliamentary	Jeremiah Jordan	2,753	58.1	+1.0
Irish Unionist	Thomas Stephenson Francis Battersby	1,982	41.9	−1.0
Majority		771	16.2	+2.0
Turnout		4,735	84.2	−4.4
Registered electors		5,622		
Irish Parliamentary hold		Swing	+1.0	

1906 general election: South Fermanagh
Party	Candidate	Votes	%	±%
Irish Parliamentary	Jeremiah Jordan	Unopposed		
Irish Parliamentary hold				

=== Elections in the 1910s ===
January 1910 general election: South Fermanagh
Party	Candidate	Votes	%	±%
Irish Parliamentary	Jeremiah Jordan	2,693	56.2	N/A
Irish Unionist	Thomas Stephenson Francis Battersby	2,098	43.8	New
Majority		595	12.4	N/A
Turnout		4,791	90.1	N/A
Registered electors		5,317		
Irish Parliamentary hold		Swing		

December 1910 general election: South Fermanagh
Party	Candidate	Votes	%	±%
Irish Parliamentary	Patrick Crumley	Unopposed		
Irish Parliamentary hold				

1918 general election (14 December 1918): South Fermanagh
Party	Candidate	Votes	%	±%
Sinn Féin	Seán O'Mahony	6,673	58.9	New
Irish Unionist	James Cooper	4,524	39.9	New
Irish Parliamentary	Patrick Crumley	132	1.2	N/A
Majority		2,149	19.0	N/A
Turnout		11,329	81.1	N/A
Registered electors		13,962		
Sinn Féin gain from Irish Parliamentary		Swing	N/A	

== Sources ==
- Walker, Brian M., ed. (1978). Parliamentary Election Results in Ireland, 1801–1922. Dublin: Royal Irish Academy. ISBN 0901714127.
- Debrett's Guide to the House of Commons and Judicial Bench. 1918. p. 220.
- Stenton, M.; Lees, S., eds. (1978). Who's Who of British members of parliament: Volume II 1886–1918. The Harvester Press.
- Leigh Rayment's Historical List of MPs – Constituencies beginning with "F"
