= Henry Campbell (MP) =

Irish nationalist politician

Sir Henry Campbell (1856 – March 6, 1924) was an Irish nationalist politician. He was Member of Parliament (MP) for South Fermanagh from 1885 to 1892, private secretary to the Irish leader Charles Stewart Parnell from 1880 to 1891, and Town Clerk of Dublin from 1893 to 1920.

Knighted by the British government in January 1921, he was known as “Sir Henry Campbell” only in retirement.

== Biography ==
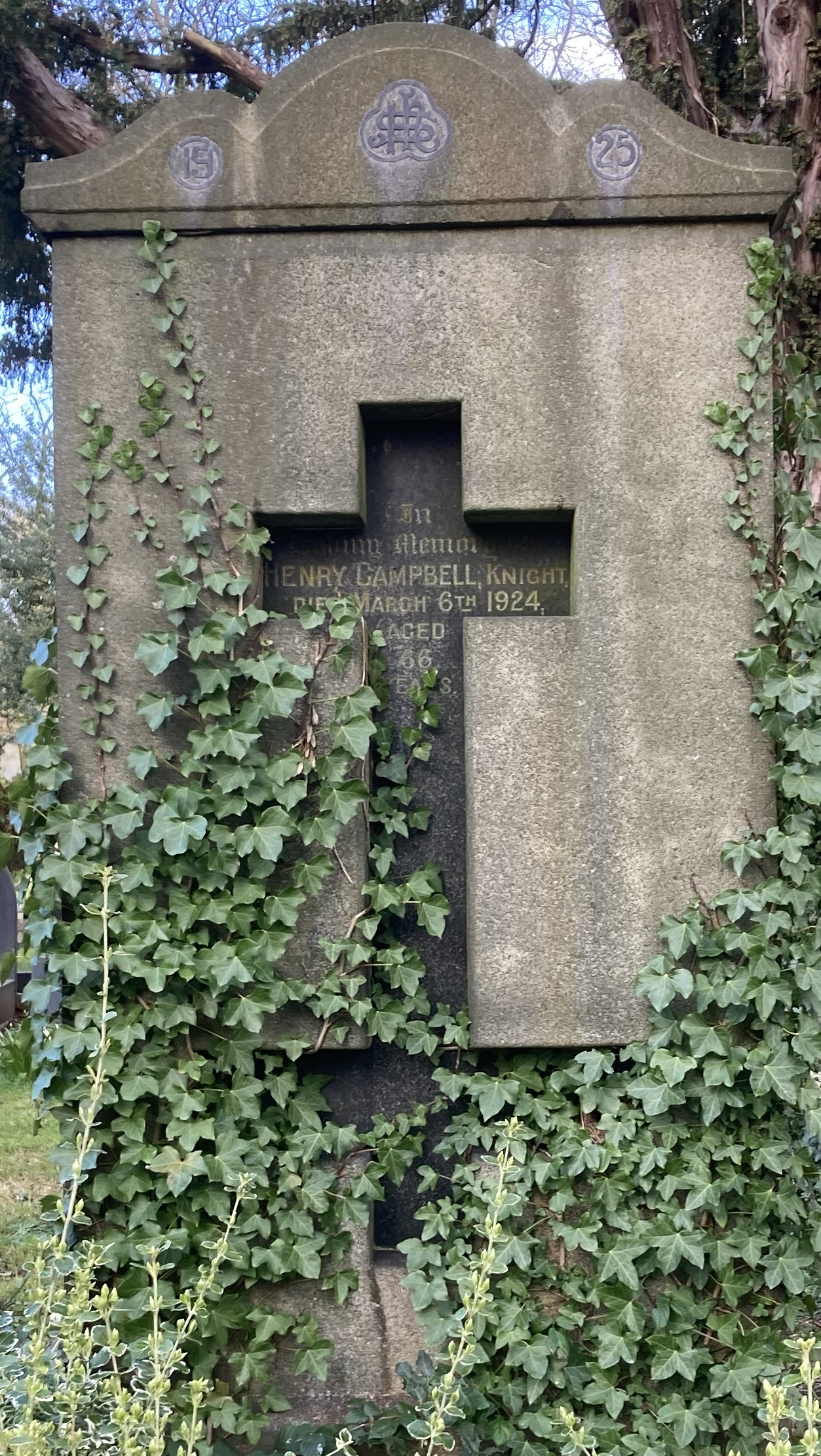
Grave of Sir Henry Campbell in Highgate Cemetery

Son of Patrick Campbell of Kilcoo, Co. Down, he began his career as a grocer's apprentice in Newry and was a member of the Catholic Young Men's Society. In 1879 he married Jenny Brewis, daughter of R. Brewis of Newcastle upon Tyne. He succeeded Timothy Healy as Parnell's private secretary in 1880 and in the 1885 general election was elected for the new parliamentary seat of South Fermanagh by 3,574 votes to the Conservative's 2,181. In the 1886 general election he was re-elected against the same opponent by only a slightly smaller majority. He was a key witness in Parnell's defence before the Parnell Commission of the late 1880s and indeed for the most part it was Campbell's writing rather than Parnell's which had been forged by Richard Pigott in the plot to discredit Parnell.

When the Irish Parliamentary Party split in December 1890 over the leadership of Parnell following the divorce case involving Katharine O'Shea, Campbell remained loyal to Parnell, and after Parnell's death in October 1891, to the Parnellite party. However, he did not contest the 1892 general election.

In 1893 the post of Town Clerk of Dublin became vacant. The Corporation was controlled by Parnellites and Campbell won the post by a large majority over six other candidates on 24 May, in an election which was seen as a tribute to Parnell.

Campbell's local government career ended in political controversy just as his parliamentary career had done. He was in conflict with Sinn Féin members of the Corporation over the question of recording the minutes in Irish. The breaking point came after Sinn Féin had taken control of the Corporation. In 1920, the Sinn Féin majority passed a resolution instructing the Town Clerk not to submit the Corporation's accounts to the Local Government Board for auditing, the Board being an arm of the British administration which Sinn Féin had repudiated. Campbell refused to comply on the ground that the resolution was unlawful. The Corporation then voted by 26–12 on 4 November 1920 to suspend him and his assistant Town Clerk, James Flood, who had declined to act in his place. Although Campbell tried to maintain his position for a time, on 17 November he resigned. He accepted a knighthood (Knight Bachelor) in the 1921 New Year Honours.

Campbell died on 6 March 1924 in London where he had come for an operation, and is buried on the east side of Highgate Cemetery. He had married for a second time in 1910 or 1911, and left a widow Alice (Harbottle Fogan). One of his sons became a barrister, being called to the bar in 1907 and practising in Dublin and on the Irish North West circuit.

Campbell was flamboyant in appearance, with a magnificent waxed moustache. He is mentioned in the ‘Eumaeus’ chapter of James Joyce's Ulysses, where a jarvey is described as resembling the town clerk Henry Campbell.

== Sources ==
- The Catholic Who’s Who and Yearbook 1917, London, Burns & Oates
- Irish Independent, 5, 9 & 18 November 1920 and 7 March 1924
- F. S. L. Lyons, Charles Stewart Parnell, London, Collins, 1977, p. 416
- Brian M. Walker (ed.), Parliamentary Election Results in Ireland, 1801-1922, Dublin, Royal Irish Academy, 1978
- The Times (London), 5 July 1892, 1 January 1921 and 7 March 1924
