= Éamon Ó Cuív =

Irish former politician (born 1950)

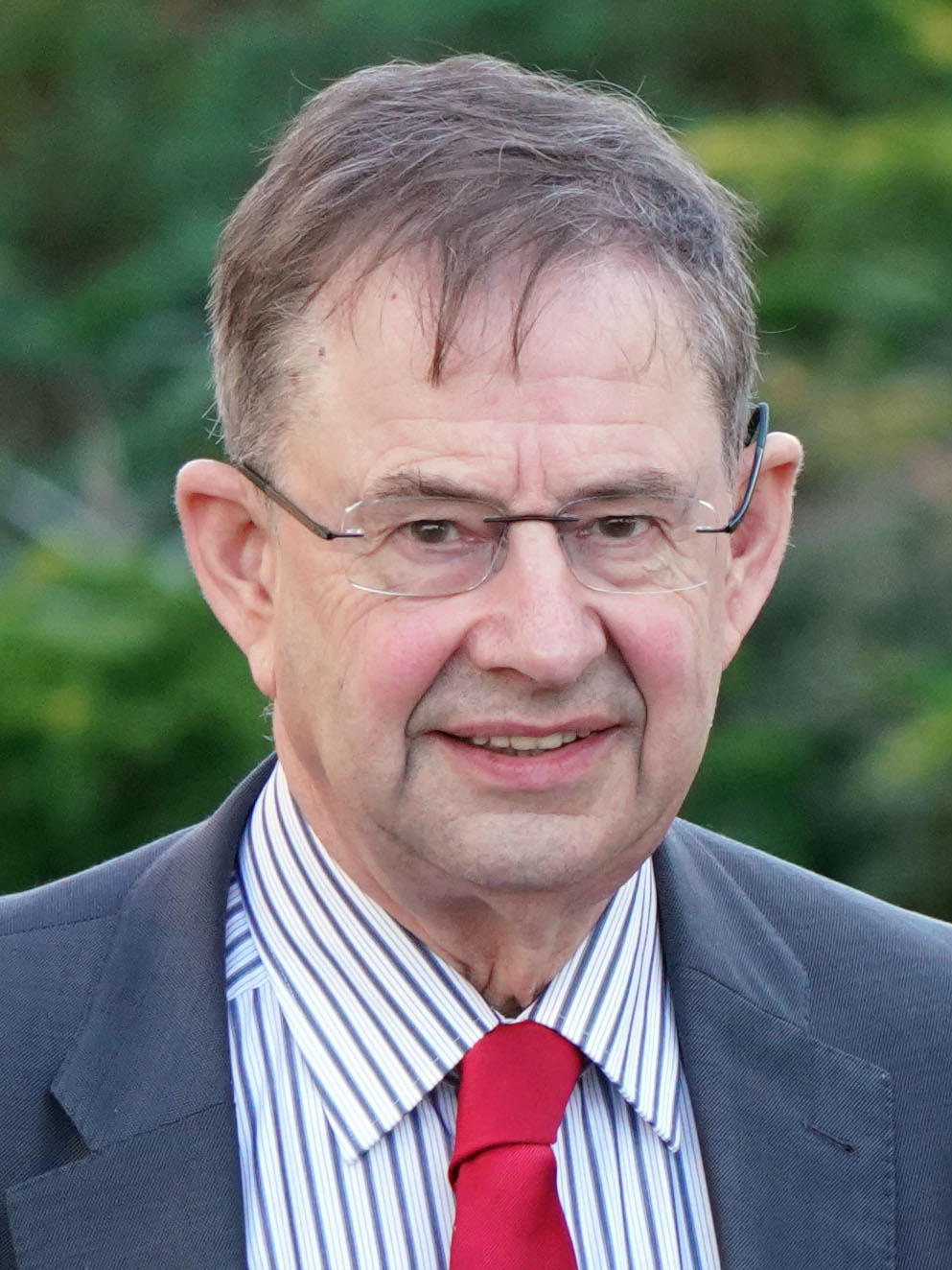
- Ó Cuív in 2019

Teachta Dála
- In office November 1992 – November 2024
- Constituency: Galway West

Deputy leader of Fianna Fáil
- In office 4 August 2011 – 29 February 2012
- Leader: Micheál Martin
- Preceded by: Brian Lenihan Jnr
- Succeeded by: Dara Calleary (2018)

Minister for the Environment, Heritage and Local Government
- In office 23 January 2011 – 9 March 2011
- Taoiseach: Brian Cowen
- Preceded by: John Gormley
- Succeeded by: Phil Hogan (Environment, Community and Local Government)

Minister for Defence
- In office 20 January 2011 – 9 March 2011
- Taoiseach: Brian Cowen
- Preceded by: Tony Killeen
- Succeeded by: Alan Shatter

Minister for Social Protection
- In office 23 March 2010 – 9 March 2011
- Taoiseach: Brian Cowen
- Preceded by: Mary Hanafin (Social and Family Affairs)
- Succeeded by: Joan Burton

Minister for Community, Rural and Gaeltacht Affairs
- In office 6 June 2002 – 23 March 2010
- Taoiseach: Bertie Ahern; Brian Cowen
- Preceded by: Síle de Valera
- Succeeded by: Pat Carey (Community, Equality and Gaeltacht Affairs)

Minister of State
- 2001–2002: Agriculture, Food and Rural Development
- 1997–2001: Arts, Heritage, Gaeltacht and the Islands

Senator
- In office 1 November 1989 – 25 November 1992
- Constituency: Cultural and Educational Panel

Personal details
- Born: 23 June 1950 (age 76) Dublin, Ireland
- Party: Fianna Fáil
- Spouse: Áine Ní Choincheannain (m. 1980)
- Children: 4
- Parent: Brian Ó Cuív (father)
- Relatives: Éamon de Valera (grandfather); Sinéad de Valera (grandmother); Vivion de Valera (uncle); Síle de Valera (cousin); Aindrias Ó Caoimh (cousin)
- Education: University College Dublin

Éamon Ó Cuív (Irish pronunciation: [ˈeːmˠən̪ˠ oː ˈkiːvʲ]; born 23 June 1950) is an Irish former Fianna Fáil politician who served as a Teachta Dála (TD) for the Galway West constituency from 1992 to 2024. He previously served as deputy leader of Fianna Fáil from 2011 to 2012, as Minister for Social Protection from 2010 to 2011, Minister for Community, Rural and Gaeltacht Affairs from 2002 to 2010, and as a Minister of State from 1997 to 2002. He also served as Minister for the Environment, Community and Local Government and Minister for Defence from January to March 2011, appointed to these positions in addition to his own on the resignation of other members of the government.

He served as a Senator for the Cultural and Educational Panel from 1989 to 1992.

He unsuccessfully contested the leadership of Fianna Fáil after the resignation of Brian Cowen. He lost to Micheál Martin. Martin appointed Ó Cuív as deputy leader of Fianna Fáil, following Brian Lenihan Jnr's death. However, Ó Cuív ceased to be deputy leader of Fianna Fáil on 29 February 2012, because of his opposition to his party's stance on the European Fiscal Compact. Ó Cuiv is the grandson of Fianna Fáil founder, Taoiseach and President of Ireland, Éamon de Valera.

== Early life and family ==
Ó Cuív is the son of Brian Ó Cuív, professor of Celtic Studies at University College Dublin, and Emer de Valera, who was the last surviving daughter of Fianna Fáil founder, Taoiseach and President of Ireland Éamon de Valera, when she died at the age of 93 in February 2012. He is a nephew of Vivion de Valera, a former TD, and is a first cousin of Síle de Valera, former Minister for Arts, Heritage, Gaeltacht and the Islands, and Aindrias Ó Caoimh, former judge of the High Court and of the European Court of Justice.

Ó Cuív's family surname was changed from Ó Caoimh by his grandfather Shán Ó Cuív, a Cork journalist. In the early 20th century Shán changed the spelling of his surname to conform to a simplified spelling system of his own invention which he called An Leitriú Shimplí. The letter 'v' is extremely rare in Irish outside modern loanwords, not being one of the 18 letters of the Irish alphabet.

He was born in Dublin and grew up in Blackrock. He was educated at Oatlands College, Dublin and University College Dublin. Before entering politics, he was the manager of Gaeltacht Co-operative, a company involved in agricultural services including timber milling, tourism and cultural development.

== Political career ==
=== National politics ===
Ó Cuív began his political career in community development, becoming manager of a newly formed Gaeltacht co-operative in Connemara at the age of 23. His work there saw him encounter the challenges of rural infrastructure, which drew him into local politics through Fianna Fáil, where he served as Cumann Chair and later Comhairle Ceantair Secretary. He first stood for election in the 1985 Irish local elections.

Ó Cuív first stood for election to Dáil Éireann at the 1987 general election in the Galway West constituency, where he was the last-placed of the four Fianna Fáil candidates, only two of whom were elected. He did better in the 1989 general election, substantially increasing his share of the first-preference votes, but was the only one of the three Fianna Fáil candidates not to be elected.

He was then elected to the 19th Seanad as a Senator for the Cultural and Educational Panel. He served there until the 1992 general election, when he finally became a TD for Galway West. His vote had increased significantly and he was elected on the first count, coming a close second for Fianna Fáil behind the Labour Party's Michael D. Higgins. At the 1997 general election, he was again elected in second place on the first count, this time being narrowly behind his Fianna Fáil colleague Frank Fahey. At the 2002 general election, he comfortably topped the poll, with over 20% of the first-preference votes. Ó Cuív again topped the poll in Galway West at the 2007 general election.

In 1994, Ó Cuív raised concern amongst some in Fianna Fáil when he suggested the possibility of a prospective conditional return to the Commonwealth of Nations as a gesture to Unionists in Northern Ireland. However, a straw poll of backbench Fianna Fáil TDs in 1998 showed that this had little support.

=== Ministerial career ===
In 1997, he was appointed Minister of State at the Department of Arts, Heritage, Gaeltacht and the Islands, with responsibility for the Gaeltacht and the islands, serving under his cousin Síle de Valera, who was the senior minister at the department. In 2001, he was reassigned as Minister of State at the Department of Agriculture, Food and Rural Development with responsibility for rural development and the Western Development Commission.

Following the 2002 general election, he was appointed to the cabinet as Minister for Community, Rural and Gaeltacht Affairs.

He publicly spoke of voting "No" in the first referendum on the Treaty of Nice. This caused controversy as the government of which he was a member had negotiated the Treaty and called for a "Yes" vote.

As minister, he introduced the Official Languages Act 2003, which created the office of An Coimisinéir Teanga.

Ó Cuív was at the centre of a controversy surrounding the official name of An Daingean / Dingle, a small Gaeltacht town in west County Kerry. The residents of the town held a plebiscite in November 2006, to determine which version of the town name should be used. Ó Cuív originally signalled that he was happy to abide by the locals' decision, but then said that the name could not legally be changed back to Dingle, following advice from the Attorney General of Ireland.

Ó Cuív was re-appointed to the same cabinet position after the 2007 election, and again in 2008 when Brian Cowen succeeded as Taoiseach.

In 2007, Ó Cuív again called for Ireland to return to the Commonwealth as a full member state, in light of the restoration of devolution to Northern Ireland and the meeting of the Commonwealth Parliamentary Association in Belfast.

In July 2009, Ó Cuív used a government helicopter to open a playground, at the cost of €10,000. On 23 March 2010, in a cabinet reshuffle, he was appointed as Minister for Social Protection. After the resignation of Tony Killeen in January 2011, Ó Cuív was also appointed as Minister for Defence, and he was also appointed Minister for the Environment, Heritage and Local Government after John Gormley's resignation days later. On 22 January 2011, after the resignation of Fianna Fáil leader Brian Cowen, Ó Cuív stated that he wished to be a candidate in the resulting election for the leadership of Fianna Fáil. He confirmed this on the TG4 News.

=== Opposition ===
Ó Cuiv was the Fianna Fáil Spokesperson for Communications, Energy and Natural Resources after Fianna Fáil were ousted from power at the 2011 general election. On 8 August 2011, party leader Micheál Martin, named Ó Cuiv as deputy leader of Fianna Fáil, replacing Brian Lenihan.

On 29 February 2012, Ó Cuív resigned as Fianna Fáil's deputy leader and Communications Spokesperson. He resigned from these positions due to dissatisfaction with his party's position on the Fiscal Compact Referendum. Fianna Fáil leader Micheál Martin stated that Ó Cuív would face expulsion from the parliamentary party if he did not vote with the party on the Fiscal Compact in the Dáil. Coming just a week before their party conference, Ó Cuív's resignation caused a split down the middle of the Fianna Fáil party.

On 12 July 2012, Ó Cuív was reappointed to the Fianna Fáil front bench as Spokesperson for Agriculture and Food, and on Community Affairs. The post of deputy leader was not filled in the reshuffle. On 8 November 2018, Ó Cuív was sacked from the Fianna Fáil front bench for unveiling a candidate in a Northern Ireland election without the party's permission.

In 2018, he was one of 25 TDs to vote against the Thirty-sixth Amendment of the Constitution Bill, which proposed to replace the protection of the life of the unborn inserted by the Eighth Amendment with a provision allowing the termination of pregnancy to be regulated by law. Ó Cuív was one of 15 TDs to vote against the Health (Regulation of Termination of Pregnancy) Bill, which became law at the end of 2018.

Following the 2020 general election, he said that he was "completely against" Fianna Fáil forming a coalition government with Fine Gael and the Green Party. He later went on to publicly doubt the programme for government.

On 24 July 2024, Ó Cuív announced that he would not contest the next general election.

== See also ==
- Families in the Oireachtas

Political offices
Preceded by Donal Carey as Minister of State at the Department of Arts, Culture and the Gaeltacht	Minister of State at the Department of Arts, Heritage, Gaeltacht and the Islands; 1997–2001	Succeeded by Mary Coughlan
Preceded by Noel Davern	Minister of State at the Department of Agriculture, Food and Rural Development; 2001–2002	Succeeded by Noel Treacy as Minister of State at the Department of Agriculture and Food
Preceded by Síle de Valera	Minister for Community, Rural and Gaeltacht Affairs; 2002–2010	Succeeded by Pat Carey as Minister for Community, Equality and Gaeltacht Affairs
Preceded by Mary Hanafin as Minister for Social and Family Affairs	Minister for Social Protection; 2010–2011	Succeeded by Joan Burton
Preceded by Tony Killeen	Minister for Defence; 2011	Succeeded by Alan Shatter
Preceded by John Gormley	Minister for the Environment, Heritage and Local Government; 2011	Succeeded by Phil Hogan as Minister for the Environment, Community and Local Government
Party political offices
Preceded by Brian Lenihan Jnr	Deputy leader of Fianna Fáil; 2011–2012	Succeeded by Dara Calleary (2018)

Dáil	Election	Deputy (Party)	Deputy (Party)	Deputy (Party)	Deputy (Party)	Deputy (Party)
9th	1937	Gerald Bartley (FF)	Joseph Mongan (FG)	Seán Tubridy (FF)	3 seats 1937–1977	
10th	1938	Gerald Bartley (FF)	Joseph Mongan (FG)	Seán Tubridy (FF)	3 seats 1937–1977	
10th	1940 by-election	Gerald Bartley (FF)	Joseph Mongan (FG)	John J. Keane (FF)	3 seats 1937–1977	
11th	1943	Gerald Bartley (FF)	Joseph Mongan (FG)	Eamon Corbett (FF)	3 seats 1937–1977	
12th	1944	Gerald Bartley (FF)	Joseph Mongan (FG)	Michael Lydon (FF)	3 seats 1937–1977	
13th	1948	Gerald Bartley (FF)	Joseph Mongan (FG)	Michael Lydon (FF)	3 seats 1937–1977	
14th	1951	Gerald Bartley (FF)	John Mannion Snr (FG)	Peadar Duignan (FF)	3 seats 1937–1977	
15th	1954	Gerald Bartley (FF)	Fintan Coogan Snr (FG)	Johnny Geoghegan (FF)	3 seats 1937–1977	
16th	1957	Gerald Bartley (FF)	Fintan Coogan Snr (FG)	Johnny Geoghegan (FF)	3 seats 1937–1977	
17th	1961	Gerald Bartley (FF)	Fintan Coogan Snr (FG)	Johnny Geoghegan (FF)	3 seats 1937–1977	
18th	1965	Bobby Molloy (FF)	Fintan Coogan Snr (FG)	Johnny Geoghegan (FF)	3 seats 1937–1977	
19th	1969	Bobby Molloy (FF)	Fintan Coogan Snr (FG)	Johnny Geoghegan (FF)	3 seats 1937–1977	
20th	1973	Bobby Molloy (FF)	Fintan Coogan Snr (FG)	Johnny Geoghegan (FF)	3 seats 1937–1977	
20th	1975 by-election	Bobby Molloy (FF)	Fintan Coogan Snr (FG)	Máire Geoghegan-Quinn (FF)	3 seats 1937–1977	
21st	1977	Bobby Molloy (FF)	John Mannion Jnr (FG)	Máire Geoghegan-Quinn (FF)	Bill Loughnane (FF)	4 seats 1977–1981
22nd	1981	Bobby Molloy (FF)	John Donnellan (FG)	Máire Geoghegan-Quinn (FF)	Mark Killilea Jnr (FF)	Michael D. Higgins (Lab)
23rd	1982 (Feb)	Bobby Molloy (FF)	John Donnellan (FG)	Máire Geoghegan-Quinn (FF)	Frank Fahey (FF)	Michael D. Higgins (Lab)
24th	1982 (Nov)	Bobby Molloy (FF)	John Donnellan (FG)	Máire Geoghegan-Quinn (FF)	Frank Fahey (FF)	Fintan Coogan Jnr (FG)
25th	1987	Bobby Molloy (PDs)	John Donnellan (FG)	Máire Geoghegan-Quinn (FF)	Frank Fahey (FF)	Michael D. Higgins (Lab)
26th	1989	Bobby Molloy (PDs)	Pádraic McCormack (FG)	Máire Geoghegan-Quinn (FF)	Frank Fahey (FF)	Michael D. Higgins (Lab)
27th	1992	Bobby Molloy (PDs)	Pádraic McCormack (FG)	Máire Geoghegan-Quinn (FF)	Éamon Ó Cuív (FF)	Michael D. Higgins (Lab)
28th	1997	Bobby Molloy (PDs)	Pádraic McCormack (FG)	Frank Fahey (FF)	Éamon Ó Cuív (FF)	Michael D. Higgins (Lab)
29th	2002	Noel Grealish (PDs)	Pádraic McCormack (FG)	Frank Fahey (FF)	Éamon Ó Cuív (FF)	Michael D. Higgins (Lab)
30th	2007	Noel Grealish (PDs)	Pádraic McCormack (FG)	Frank Fahey (FF)	Éamon Ó Cuív (FF)	Michael D. Higgins (Lab)
31st	2011	Noel Grealish (Ind.)	Brian Walsh (FG)	Seán Kyne (FG)	Éamon Ó Cuív (FF)	Derek Nolan (Lab)
32nd	2016	Noel Grealish (Ind.)	Hildegarde Naughton (FG)	Seán Kyne (FG)	Éamon Ó Cuív (FF)	Catherine Connolly (Ind.)
33rd	2020	Noel Grealish (Ind.)	Hildegarde Naughton (FG)	Mairéad Farrell (SF)	Éamon Ó Cuív (FF)	Catherine Connolly (Ind.)
34th	2024	Noel Grealish (Ind.)	Hildegarde Naughton (FG)	Mairéad Farrell (SF)	John Connolly (FF)	Catherine Connolly (Ind.)
34th	2026 by-election	Noel Grealish (Ind.)	Hildegarde Naughton (FG)	Mairéad Farrell (SF)	John Connolly (FF)	Seán Kyne (FG)
