= Patrick McGilligan (Fine Gael politician) =

Irish politician (1889–1979)

- McGilligan in 1948

Attorney General of Ireland
- In office 2 June 1954 – 20 March 1957
- Taoiseach: John A. Costello
- Preceded by: Aindrias Ó Caoimh
- Succeeded by: Aindrias Ó Caoimh

Minister for Finance
- In office 18 February 1948 – 13 June 1951
- Taoiseach: John A. Costello
- Preceded by: Frank Aiken
- Succeeded by: Seán MacEntee

Minister for External Affairs
- In office 11 October 1927 – 9 March 1932
- President: W. T. Cosgrave
- Preceded by: W. T. Cosgrave
- Succeeded by: Éamon de Valera

Minister for Industry and Commerce
- In office 4 April 1924 – 9 March 1932
- President: W. T. Cosgrave
- Preceded by: John McManus
- Succeeded by: Seán Lemass

Teachta Dála
- In office February 1948 – June 1965
- Constituency: Dublin North-Central
- In office July 1937 – February 1948
- Constituency: Dublin North-West
- In office November 1923 – July 1937
- Constituency: National University

Personal details
- Born: 12 April 1889 Coleraine, County Londonderry, Ireland
- Died: 15 November 1979 (aged 90) Dalkey, Dublin, Ireland
- Party: Fine Gael
- Other political affiliations: Sinn Féin; Cumann na nGaedheal
- Spouse: Anne Conolly (m. 1929)
- Children: 4
- Education: University College Dublin

Patrick Joseph McGilligan (12 April 1889 – 15 November 1979) was an Irish Fine Gael politician who served as the 14th Attorney General of Ireland from 1954 to 1957, Minister for Finance from 1948 to 1951, Minister for External Affairs from 1927 to 1932 and Minister for Industry and Commerce from 1924 to 1932. He served as a Teachta Dála (TD) from 1923 to 1965.

== Early life ==
McGilligan was born in Hanover Place, Coleraine, County Londonderry, the son of Patrick McGilligan, a draper, who would serve as MP for South Fermanagh from 1892 to 1895 for the Irish Parliamentary Party, and Catherine O'Farrell. He was educated at St Columb's College in Derry; Clongowes Wood College in County Kildare and University College Dublin.

== Lawyer and politician ==
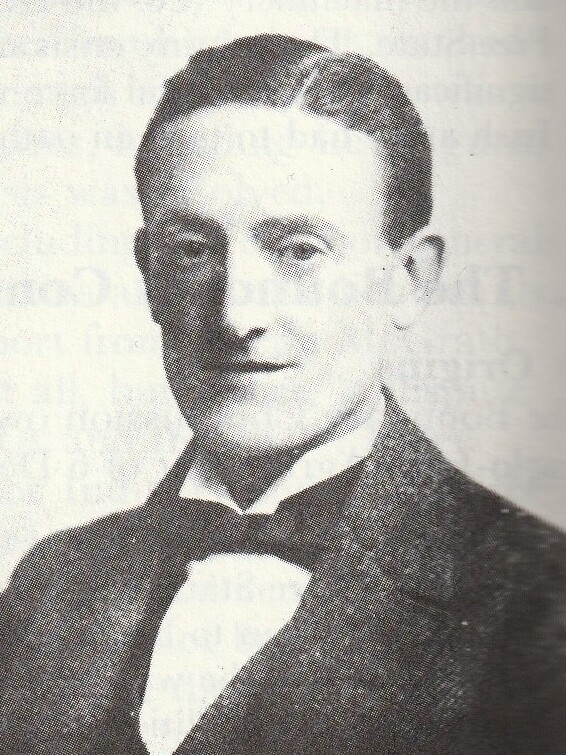
Patrick McGilligan in 1925

McGillgan joined Sinn Féin and in 1916 was expelled from his golf club for wearing an emblem supporting the party. He was unsuccessful in his attempt to be elected as an MP at the 1918 general election. McGilligan was called to the bar in 1921.

== Minister for Industry and Commerce ==
He was elected as a Cumann na nGaedheal TD for the National University at a by-election held on 3 November 1923. His time in Government was marked by economic retrenchment and a focus on low taxation. At the beginning of his time in office he declared that "People may have to die in this country and may have to die of starvation". Between 1924 and 1932, McGilligan served as Minister for Industry and Commerce, notably pushing through the Shannon hydroelectric scheme, then the largest hydroelectricity project in the world. In 1927, he set up the Electricity Supply Board (ESB), and also the Agricultural Credit Corporation.

== Minister for External Affairs ==
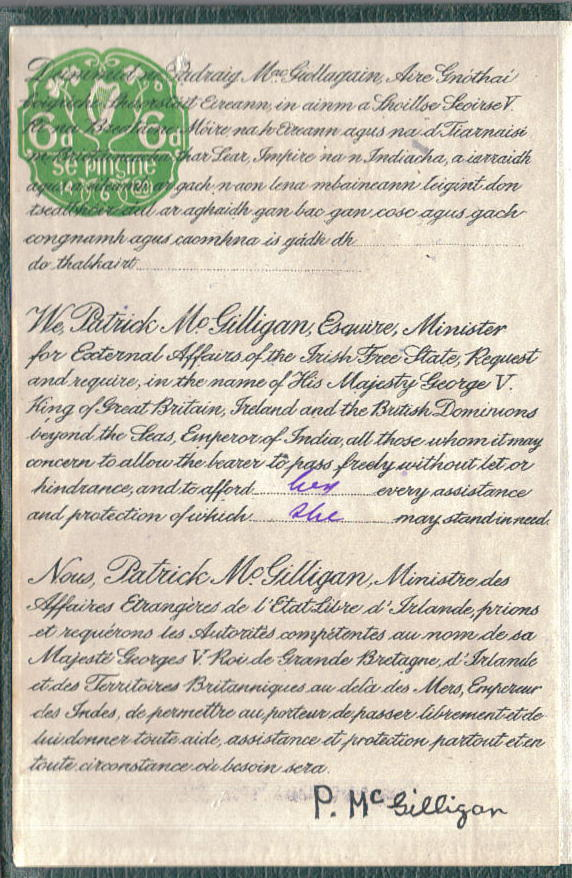
Request page of Irish Free State passport (issued 1930). "We, Patrick McGilligan, Esquire, Minister for External Affairs of the Irish Free State, Request and require, in the name of His Majesty George V. King of Great Britain, Ireland and the British Dominions beyond the Seas, Emperor of India, all those whom it may concern to allow the bearer to pass freely etc."

In 1927, McGilligan was appointed as Minister for External Affairs, following the assassination of Kevin O'Higgins by the anti-Treaty elements of the IRA, in revenge for O'Higgins' support for the execution of Republican prisoners during the Irish Civil War (1922–23). In this position, he was hugely influential at the Committee on the Operation of Dominion Legislation and at the Imperial Conference in 1930 (jointly with representatives of Australia, Canada, New Zealand, South Africa and the United Kingdom). The Statute of Westminster that emerged from these meetings gave greater power to dominions in the Commonwealth like the Irish Free State.

== In opposition ==
Following the 1932 general election, Cumann na nGaedhael were sent into opposition for the first time as Fianna Fáil took over as the government. Tensions between the two parties ratcheted up as both sides began to turn towards paramilitaries. The Irish Republican Army began to disrupt Cumann na nGaedhael public meetings, and in turn, a pro-Cumann na nGaedhael paramilitary called the Army Comrades Association (later better known as the Blueshirts) was created to counteract the IRA and disrupt Fianna Fáil meetings. As the links between the Blueshirts and Cumann na nGaedhael rapidly developed, sitting CnaG Teachta Dála Thomas F. O'Higgins became the leader of the ACA. He was joined by several other CnaG TDs including McGilligan. Cumann na nGaedhael, The National Centre Party and the Blueshirts would eventually merge into one new party called Fine Gael in the aftermath of the 1933 general election and the banning of the Blueshirts. Despite their combination of strength, they failed to make much of an impact in the 1934 local elections either. Fine Gael would remain in opposition until the 1948 general election.

During this period in opposition from 1932 to 1948, McGilligan built up a law practice and became a professor of constitutional and international law at University College Dublin. When the National University Dáil constituency was abolished in 1937 (before being recreated in the Seanad in 1938), McGilligan was elected as TD for Dublin North-West.

== Inter-Party governments ==
In 1948, McGilligan was appointed Minister for Finance in the first Inter-Party Government. As Minister, he undertook some major reforms. He instigated a new approach where the government invested radically in capital projects. Colleagues however complained of his frequent absence from cabinet and the difficulty of contacting him at the Department of Finance. Between 1954 and 1957, he served as Attorney General, a job in which, as he admitted, he felt far more at home than as Minister for Finance. He lost his seat at the 1965 general election. He then retired from politics, having served for over 40 years.

== Death and legacy ==
Patrick McGilligan died in Dublin on 15 November 1979; at the age of ninety. A later Attorney General, John M. Kelly in the preface to his definitive text, The Irish Constitution (1980), noted the remarkable number of senior judges who were former students of McGilligan and suggested that given his own firm belief in the value of judicial review, he deserves much of the credit for the remarkable development of Irish law in this field since the early 1960s.

Political offices
Preceded by Joseph McGrath	Minister for Industry and Commerce; 1924–1932	Succeeded by Seán Lemass
Preceded by Kevin O'Higgins	Minister for External Affairs; 1927–1932	Succeeded by Éamon de Valera
Preceded by Frank Aiken	Minister for Finance; 1948–1951	Succeeded by Seán MacEntee
Legal offices
Preceded by Aindrias Ó Caoimh	Attorney General of Ireland; 1954–1957	Succeeded by Aindrias Ó Caoimh

Dáil	Election	Deputy (Party)	Deputy (Party)	Deputy (Party)	Deputy (Party)
1st	1918	Eoin MacNeill (SF)	1 seat under 1918 Act		
2nd	1921	Eoin MacNeill (SF)	Ada English (SF)	Michael Hayes (SF)	William Stockley (SF)
3rd	1922	Eoin MacNeill (PT-SF)	William Magennis (Ind.)	Michael Hayes (Note: Michael Hayes served as Ceann Comhairle from 9 September 1922 to 29 January 1932.) (PT-SF)	William Stockley (AT-SF)
4th	1923	Eoin MacNeill (CnaG)	William Magennis (CnaG)	Michael Hayes (CnaG)	3 seats from 1923
4th	1923 by-election	Patrick McGilligan (CnaG)	William Magennis (CnaG)	Michael Hayes (CnaG)	3 seats from 1923
5th	1927 (Jun)	Patrick McGilligan (CnaG)	Arthur Clery (Ind.)	Michael Hayes (CnaG)	3 seats from 1923
6th	1927 (Sep)	Patrick McGilligan (CnaG)	Michael Tierney (CnaG)	Michael Hayes (CnaG)	3 seats from 1923
7th	1932	Patrick McGilligan (CnaG)	Conor Maguire (FF)	Michael Hayes (CnaG)	3 seats from 1923
8th	1933	Patrick McGilligan (CnaG)	Conor Maguire (FF)	Helena Concannon (FF)	3 seats from 1923
8th	1936	Patrick McGilligan (CnaG)	(Vacant)	Helena Concannon (FF)	3 seats from 1923

Dáil	Election	Deputy (Party)	Deputy (Party)	Deputy (Party)	Deputy (Party)
2nd	1921	Philip Cosgrave (SF)	Joseph McGrath (SF)	Richard Mulcahy (SF)	Michael Staines (SF)
3rd	1922	Philip Cosgrave (PT-SF)	Joseph McGrath (PT-SF)	Richard Mulcahy (PT-SF)	Michael Staines (PT-SF)
4th	1923	Constituency abolished. See Dublin North			

Dáil	Election	Deputy (Party)	Deputy (Party)	Deputy (Party)	Deputy (Party)	Deputy (Party)
9th	1937	Seán T. O'Kelly (FF)	A. P. Byrne (Ind.)	Cormac Breathnach (FF)	Patrick McGilligan (FG)	Archie Heron (Lab)
10th	1938	Seán T. O'Kelly (FF)	A. P. Byrne (Ind.)	Cormac Breathnach (FF)	Patrick McGilligan (FG)	Eamonn Cooney (FF)
11th	1943	Seán T. O'Kelly (FF)	A. P. Byrne (Ind.)	Cormac Breathnach (FF)	Patrick McGilligan (FG)	Martin O'Sullivan (Lab)
12th	1944	Seán T. O'Kelly (FF)	John S. O'Connor (FF)	Cormac Breathnach (FF)	Patrick McGilligan (FG)	Martin O'Sullivan (Lab)
12th	1945 by-election	Vivion de Valera (FF)	John S. O'Connor (FF)	Cormac Breathnach (FF)	Patrick McGilligan (FG)	Martin O'Sullivan (Lab)
13th	1948	Mick Fitzpatrick (CnaP)	A. P. Byrne (Ind.)	Cormac Breathnach (FF)	3 seats from 1948 to 1969	
14th	1951	Declan Costello (FG)	A. P. Byrne (Ind.)	Cormac Breathnach (FF)	3 seats from 1948 to 1969	
14th	1952 by-election	Declan Costello (FG)	Thomas Byrne (Ind.)	Cormac Breathnach (FF)	3 seats from 1948 to 1969	
15th	1954	Declan Costello (FG)	Thomas Byrne (Ind.)	Richard Gogan (FF)	3 seats from 1948 to 1969	
16th	1957	Declan Costello (FG)	Thomas Byrne (Ind.)	Richard Gogan (FF)	3 seats from 1948 to 1969	
17th	1961	Declan Costello (FG)	Michael Mullen (Lab)	Richard Gogan (FF)	3 seats from 1948 to 1969	
18th	1965	Declan Costello (FG)	Michael Mullen (Lab)	Richard Gogan (FF)	3 seats from 1948 to 1969	
19th	1969	Hugh Byrne (FG)	Jim Tunney (FF)	Richard Gogan (FF)	David Thornley (Lab)	4 seats from 1969 to 1977
20th	1973	Hugh Byrne (FG)	Jim Tunney (FF)	Richard Gogan (FF)	David Thornley (Lab)	4 seats from 1969 to 1977
21st	1977	Constituency abolished. See Dublin Finglas and Dublin Cabra				

Dáil	Election	Deputy (Party)	Deputy (Party)	Deputy (Party)	Deputy (Party)
22nd	1981	Jim Tunney (FF)	Michael Barrett (FF)	Mary Flaherty (FG)	Hugh Byrne (FG)
23rd	1982 (Feb)	Jim Tunney (FF)	Michael Barrett (FF)	Mary Flaherty (FG)	Proinsias De Rossa (WP)
24th	1982 (Nov)	Jim Tunney (FF)	Michael Barrett (FF)	Mary Flaherty (FG)	Proinsias De Rossa (WP)
25th	1987	Jim Tunney (FF)	Michael Barrett (FF)	Mary Flaherty (FG)	Proinsias De Rossa (WP)
26th	1989	Jim Tunney (FF)	Michael Barrett (FF)	Mary Flaherty (FG)	Proinsias De Rossa (WP)
27th	1992	Noel Ahern (FF)	Róisín Shortall (Lab)	Mary Flaherty (FG)	Proinsias De Rossa (DL)
28th	1997	Noel Ahern (FF)	Róisín Shortall (Lab)	Pat Carey (FF)	Proinsias De Rossa (DL)
29th	2002	Noel Ahern (FF)	Róisín Shortall (Lab)	Pat Carey (FF)	3 seats from 2002
30th	2007	Noel Ahern (FF)	Róisín Shortall (Lab)	Pat Carey (FF)	3 seats from 2002
31st	2011	Dessie Ellis (SF)	Róisín Shortall (Lab)	John Lyons (Lab)	3 seats from 2002
32nd	2016	Dessie Ellis (SF)	Róisín Shortall (SD)	Noel Rock (FG)	3 seats from 2002
33rd	2020	Dessie Ellis (SF)	Róisín Shortall (SD)	Paul McAuliffe (FF)	3 seats from 2002
34th	2024	Dessie Ellis (SF)	Rory Hearne (SD)	Paul McAuliffe (FF)	3 seats from 2002

Dáil	Election	Deputy (Party)	Deputy (Party)	Deputy (Party)	Deputy (Party)
13th	1948	Vivion de Valera (FF)	Martin O'Sullivan (Lab)	Patrick McGilligan (FG)	3 seats 1948–1961
14th	1951	Vivion de Valera (FF)	Colm Gallagher (FF)	Patrick McGilligan (FG)	3 seats 1948–1961
15th	1954	Vivion de Valera (FF)	Maureen O'Carroll (Lab)	Patrick McGilligan (FG)	3 seats 1948–1961
16th	1957	Vivion de Valera (FF)	Colm Gallagher (FF)	Patrick McGilligan (FG)	3 seats 1948–1961
16th	1957 by-election	Vivion de Valera (FF)	Frank Sherwin (Ind.)	Patrick McGilligan (FG)	3 seats 1948–1961
17th	1961	Vivion de Valera (FF)	Frank Sherwin (Ind.)	Patrick McGilligan (FG)	Celia Lynch (FF)
18th	1965	Vivion de Valera (FF)	Michael O'Leary (Lab)	Luke Belton (FG)	Celia Lynch (FF)
19th	1969	George Colley (FF)	Michael O'Leary (Lab)	Luke Belton (FG)	Celia Lynch (FF)
20th	1973	George Colley (FF)	Michael O'Leary (Lab)	Luke Belton (FG)	Celia Lynch (FF)
21st	1977	Vincent Brady (FF)	Michael O'Leary (Lab)	Michael Keating (FG)	3 seats 1977–1981
22nd	1981	Vincent Brady (FF)	Charles Haughey (FF)	Noël Browne (SLP)	George Birmingham (FG)
23rd	1982 (Feb)	Vincent Brady (FF)	Charles Haughey (FF)	Richard Bruton (FG)	George Birmingham (FG)
24th	1982 (Nov)	Vincent Brady (FF)	Charles Haughey (FF)	Richard Bruton (FG)	George Birmingham (FG)
25th	1987	Vincent Brady (FF)	Charles Haughey (FF)	Richard Bruton (FG)	George Birmingham (FG)
26th	1989	Vincent Brady (FF)	Charles Haughey (FF)	Richard Bruton (FG)	Ivor Callely (FF)
27th	1992	Seán Haughey (FF)	Derek McDowell (Lab)	Richard Bruton (FG)	Ivor Callely (FF)
28th	1997	Seán Haughey (FF)	Derek McDowell (Lab)	Richard Bruton (FG)	Ivor Callely (FF)
29th	2002	Seán Haughey (FF)	Finian McGrath (Ind.)	Richard Bruton (FG)	Ivor Callely (FF)
30th	2007	Seán Haughey (FF)	Finian McGrath (Ind.)	Richard Bruton (FG)	3 seats from 2007
31st	2011	Aodhán Ó Ríordáin (Lab)	Finian McGrath (Ind.)	Richard Bruton (FG)	3 seats from 2007
32nd	2016	Constituency abolished. See Dublin Bay North			
