= Thomas Teevan (attorney general) =

Irish barrister and judge

Judge of the High Court
- In office 30 January 1954 – 4 March 1971
- Nominated by: Government of Ireland
- Appointed by: Seán T. O'Kelly

Attorney General of Ireland
- In office 11 July 1953 – 30 January 1954
- Taoiseach: Éamon de Valera
- Preceded by: Cearbhall Ó Dálaigh
- Succeeded by: Aindrias Ó Caoimh

Personal details
- Born: 12 May 1903 Cavan, Ireland
- Died: 8 June 1976 (aged 73) Dublin, Ireland
- Party: Fianna Fáil
- Spouse(s): Gertrude McCall (m. 1928; d. 1976)
- Relations: Kevin Myers (nephew)
- Children: 2
- Education: University College Dublin

Thomas Teevan (12 May 1903 – 8 June 1976) was an Irish barrister and judge who served as a Judge of the High Court from 1954 to 1971 and Attorney General of Ireland from 1953 to 1954.

He was born in Cavan in 1903, the second son of Dr. Francis Teevan and his wife Anne. The family moved to Dundalk, County Louth, where he went to the Christian Brothers School and then to University College Dublin. He initially qualified as a solicitor in 1925; was called to the Bar in 1936, and Senior Counsel in 1946. He stood unsuccessfully for election at the 1948 general election. He was appointed Attorney General of Ireland by Éamon de Valera in 1953, until he was appointed a judge of the High Court in 1954, where he served until 1971. He died in 1976.

Thomas married Gertrude McCall (1904–2001) with whom he had two sons, Diarmuid and Richard, and was the uncle of the journalist Kevin Myers who recalled his uncle as "a gentleman, scholarly and kind".

His first case as a judge was probably the most memorable: the unsuccessful libel action by Patrick Kavanagh against the Leader magazine. Such was the interest that members of the public queued for hours in the hope of getting into the courtroom.

As both a barrister and judge, he was an expert on rights of way, a field of law which he admitted did nothing to improve one's view of human nature. Giving judgement in Connell v. Porter (21 December 1967) he described the behaviour of both parties as "disgusting" and made the memorable remark: "It is a strange paradox of our times that concurrently with so much alertness to personal rights, very many people flagrantly and callously do serious hurt to the feelings, rights and properties of others and expect immunity for their trespasses".

Legal offices
Preceded by Cearbhall Ó Dálaigh	Attorney General of Ireland; 1953–1954	Succeeded by Aindrias Ó Caoimh
