= Brian Ó Cuív =

Irish Celtic scholar

- Born: 20 November 1916
- Died: 14 November 1999 (aged 82)
- Occupation: Scholar
- Spouse: Emer de Valera
- Children: 9

Academic work
- Discipline: Celtic studies
- Sub-discipline: Irish history and philology
- Institutions: University College Dublin
- Notable works: The Irish of West Muskerry, Co. Cork: A Phonetic Study

Brian Ó Cuív (20 November 1916 – 14 November 1999) was an Irish scholar who specialised in Celtic history and philology.

== Life ==
Ó Cuív was professor of Celtic Studies at University College Dublin and later at the Dublin Institute for Advanced Studies. His later years were devoted to the compilation of a catalogue of the Irish manuscripts in the University of Oxford. The completed catalogue was published after his death.

He married Emer de Valera — a daughter of Éamon de Valera. They had nine children. Emer died in 2012. Their son — Éamon Ó Cuív — is a former Irish politician.

== Surname ==
Ó Cuív's surname was changed from Ó Caoimh (O'Keeffe) by his father, Shán Ó Cuív, a Cork journalist, who in the early 20th century changed the spelling of his surname to conform with a simplified spelling system of his own invention, which he called An Leitriú Shimplí. The letter 'v' is extremely rare in Irish outside modern loanwords.

== Works ==
His works include:

- The Irish of West Muskerry, Co. Cork: A Phonetic Study (1951)
- Irish Dialects and Irish Speaking Districts: Three Lectures (1951)
- Parliament Na mBan, editor (1952)
- Seven Centuries of Irish Learning: 1000–1700 (1961)
- A View of the Irish Language (1969)
- The Linguistic Training of the Mediaeval Irish Poet (1973)
- The Impact of the Scandinavian Invasions on the Celtic-speaking Peoples c. 800–1100 A.D. (1983)
- Catalogue of Irish Manuscripts in the Bodleian Library at Oxford and Oxford College Libraries (2001-03) 2 vols. Dublin: Dublin Institute for Advanced Studies, School of Celtic Studies
