= List of MPs elected in the 1918 United Kingdom general election =

1918–1922 Parliament of the United Kingdom
←	Dec 1910–1918 Parliament	1922–1923 Parliament	→
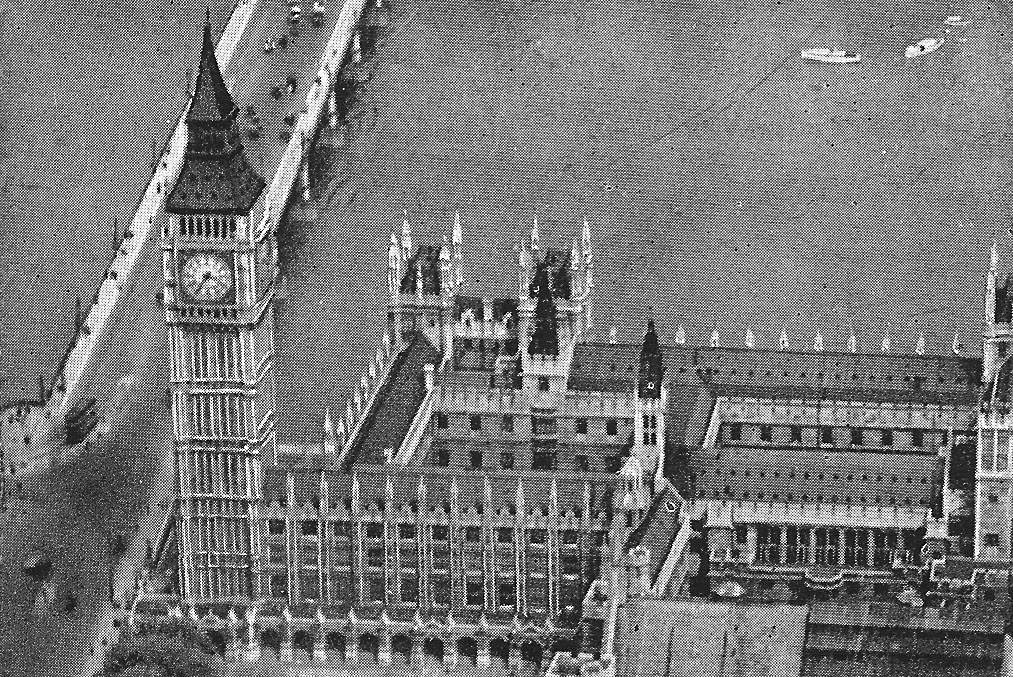
- Palace of Westminster in 1919

Overview
- Legislative body: Parliament of the United Kingdom
- Term: 14 December 1918 – 15 November 1922
- Election: 1918 United Kingdom general election
- Government: Second Lloyd George ministry

House of Commons
- Members: 707
- Speaker: James Lowther (until 1921); John Henry Whitley (from 1921)
- Leader: Bonar Law (until 1921); Austen Chamberlain (from 1921)
- Prime Minister: David Lloyd George
- Leader of the Opposition: Sir Donald Maclean (until 1920); H. H. Asquith (from 1920)
- Third-party leader: Éamon de Valera or William Adamson

House of Lords
- Lord Chancellor: Robert Finlay, 1st Viscount Finlay (until 1919); F. E. Smith, 1st Earl of Birkenhead (from 1919)
- Leader of the House of Lords: George Curzon, 1st Marquess Curzon of Kedleston

Crown-in-Parliament George V

Sessions
- 1st: 4 February 1919 – 23 December 1919
- 2nd: 10 February 1920 – 23 December 1920
- 3rd: 15 February 1921 – 10 November 1921
- 4th: 14 December 1921 – 19 December 1921
- 5th: 7 February 1922 – 4 August 1922

The Members of Parliament (MPs) elected in the 1918 general election were elected on 14 December 1918, assembled on 4 February 1919 and was dissolved on 26 October 1922.

The normal polling day did not apply to the university constituencies (polls open for five days) and Orkney and Shetland (poll open two days). Votes in the territorial constituencies were not counted until 28 December 1918 to allow time for postal votes from members of the armed forces to arrive.

Coalition and Non-Coalition: In most constituencies in Great Britain one supporter of the coalition government, led by David Lloyd George (the Liberal Prime Minister) and Bonar Law (the Conservative leader), was issued the so-called coupon. Candidates elected as Liberals or Conservatives, without the coupon, were not necessarily hostile to the government. This list follows the label used in F.W.S. Craig's book cited below. No attempt is made to indicate changes between the Coalition and Non-Coalition wings of a party. Few coupons were issued to Irish candidates, so none are designated as Coalition MPs.

Conservative and Unionist MPs: Conservative, Irish Unionist, Labour Unionist and Ulster Unionist MPs constituted a single party in Parliament. Candidates of the Ulster Unionist Council are classified as Irish Unionists until May 1921 and Ulster Unionists thereafter. The only Unionists in this Parliament not to be from Ulster constituencies represented Dublin Rathmines and Dublin University.

In The Economic Consequences of the Peace, John Maynard Keynes included a remark about the Conservative MPs in this Parliament attributed to a Conservative friend that "They are a lot of hard-faced men, who look as if they had done very well out of the war". Keynes privately confirmed that the friend who originated the remark was Stanley Baldwin.

== A ==
Constituency	MP	Party
Aberavon	Jack Edwards	Coalition Liberal
Aberdare	Charles Stanton	Coalition NDP
Aberdeen North	Frank Rose	Independent Labour
Aberdeen South	Frederick Thomson	Co. Conservative
Aberdeenshire Central	Sir Alexander Theodore Gordon	Co. Conservative
Aberdeenshire East	Sir Henry Cowan	Coalition Liberal
Aberdeenshire West and Kincardine	Hon. Arthur Murray	Coalition Liberal
Abertillery	William Brace	Labour
Abingdon	John Tyson Wigan	Co. Conservative
Accrington	Ernest Gray	Co. Conservative
Acton	Sir Harry Brittain	Co. Conservative
Aldershot	Viscount Wolmer	Co. Conservative
Altrincham	George Hamilton	Co. Conservative
Anglesey	Sir Owen Thomas	Independent Labour
Antrim East	Robert McCalmont	Irish Unionist
Antrim Mid	Hon. Hugh O'Neill	Irish Unionist
Antrim North	Peter Kerr-Smiley	Irish Unionist
Antrim South	Charles Craig	Irish Unionist
Argyllshire	William Sutherland	Coalition Liberal
Armagh Mid	James Lonsdale	Irish Unionist
Armagh North	William Allen	Irish Unionist
Armagh South	Patrick Donnelly	Irish Nationalist
Ashford	Samuel Strang Steel	Co. Conservative
Ashton-under-Lyne	Sir Albert Stanley	Co. Conservative
Aylesbury	Lionel de Rothschild	Co. Conservative
Ayr Burghs	Sir George Younger, Bt	Co. Conservative
Ayrshire North and Bute	Sir Aylmer Hunter-Weston	Co. Conservative
Ayrshire South	James Brown	Labour
== B ==
Balham and Tooting	John Denison-Pender	Co. Conservative
Banbury	Sir Rhys Rhys-Williams, Bt	Coalition Liberal
Banff	Charles Barrie	Coalition Liberal
Barkston Ash	George Lane-Fox	Co. Conservative
Barnard Castle	John Swan	Labour
Barnsley	Sir Joseph Walton	Coalition Liberal
Barnstaple	Tudor Rees	Coalition Liberal
Barrow-in-Furness	Robert Burton-Chadwick	Conservative
Basingstoke	Auckland Geddes	Co. Conservative
Bassetlaw	Sir William Hume-Williams	Co. Conservative
Bath	Charles Foxcroft	Co. Conservative
Batley and Morley	Gerald France	Coalition Liberal
Battersea North	Richard Morris	Coalition Liberal
Battersea South	Viscount Curzon	Co. Conservative
Bedford	Frederick Kellaway	Coalition Liberal
Bedfordshire Mid	Max Townley	Co. Conservative
Bedwellty	Charles Edwards	Labour
Belfast Cromac	William Arthur Lindsay	Irish Unionist
Belfast Duncairn	Sir Edward Carson	Irish Unionist
Belfast Falls	Joseph Devlin	Irish Nationalist
Belfast Ormeau	Thomas Moles	Irish Unionist
Belfast Pottinger	Herbert Dixon	Irish Unionist
Belfast Shankill	Samuel McGuffin	Labour Unionist
Belfast St Anne's	Thomas Henry Burn	Labour Unionist
Belfast Victoria	Thompson Donald	Labour Unionist
Belfast Woodvale	Robert Lynn	Irish Unionist
Belper	John Hancock	Liberal
Bermondsey West	Harold Glanville	Liberal
Berwick-on-Tweed	Sir Francis Blake, Bt	Liberal
Berwick and Haddington	John Hope	Coalition Liberal
Bethnal Green North-East	Sir Edwin Cornwall, Bt	Coalition Liberal
Bethnal Green South-West	Sir Mathew Wilson, Bt	Co. Conservative
Bewdley	Stanley Baldwin	Co. Conservative
Birkenhead East	Alfred Bigland	Co. Conservative
Birkenhead West	Henry Grayson	Co. Conservative
Birmingham Aston	Evelyn Cecil	Co. Conservative
Birmingham Deritend	John William Dennis	Co. Conservative
Birmingham Duddeston	Eldred Hallas	Coalition NDP
Birmingham Edgbaston	Sir Francis Lowe, Bt	Co. Conservative
Birmingham Erdington	Sir Arthur Steel-Maitland, Bt	Co. Conservative
Birmingham Handsworth	Ernest Meysey-Thompson	Co. Conservative
Birmingham King's Norton	Sir Herbert Austin	Co. Conservative
Birmingham Ladywood	Neville Chamberlain	Co. Conservative
Birmingham Moseley	Sir Hallewell Rogers	Co. Conservative
Birmingham Sparkbrook	Leo Amery	Co. Conservative
Birmingham West	Sir Austen Chamberlain	Co. Conservative
Birmingham Yardley	Alfred Jephcott	Co. Conservative
Bishop Auckland	Ben Spoor	Labour
Blackburn (Two members)	Sir Henry Norman, Bt	Coalition Liberal
Blackburn (Two members)	Percy Dean	Co. Conservative
Blackpool	Albert Lindsay Parkinson	Co. Conservative
Blaydon	Walter Waring	Coalition Liberal
Bodmin	Sir Charles Hanson, Bt	Co. Conservative
Bolton (Two members)	Robert Tootill	Labour
Bolton (Two members)	William Edge	Coalition Liberal
Bootle	Sir Thomas Royden, Bt	Co. Conservative
Bosworth	Hon. Henry McLaren	Coalition Liberal
Bothwell	David Macdonald	Co. Conservative
Bournemouth	Sir Henry Page Croft	National Party
Bow and Bromley	Reginald Blair	Co. Conservative
Bradford Central	Henry Butler Ratcliffe	Co. Conservative
Bradford East	Charles Edgar Loseby	Coalition NDP
Bradford North	Archibald Boyd-Carpenter	Co. Conservative
Bradford South	Vernon Willey	Co. Conservative
Brecon and Radnor	Sidney Robinson	Coalition Liberal
Brentford and Chiswick	Walter Morden	Co. Conservative
Bridgwater	Robert Sanders	Co. Conservative
Brigg	C. W. W. McLean	Co. Conservative
Brighton (Two members)	George Tryon	Co. Conservative
Brighton (Two members)	Charles Thomas-Stanford	Co. Conservative
Bristol Central	Thomas Inskip	Co. Conservative
Bristol East	George Britton	Coalition Liberal
Bristol North	Stanley Gange	Coalition Liberal
Bristol South	Sir Howell Davies	Coalition Liberal
Bristol West	George Gibbs	Co. Conservative
Brixton	Davison Dalziel	Co. Conservative
Bromley	Henry Forster	Co. Conservative
Broxtowe	George Spencer	Labour
Buckingham	George Bowyer	Co. Conservative
Buckrose	Algernon Moreing	Coalition Liberal
Burnley	Dan Irving	Labour
Burslem	Samuel Finney	Labour
Burton	John Gretton	Co. Conservative
Bury	Charles Ainsworth	Conservative
Bury St Edmunds	Hon. Walter Guinness	Co. Conservative
== C ==
Caerphilly	Alfred Onions	Labour
Caithness and Sutherland	Sir Leicester Harmsworth	Coalition Liberal
Camberwell North	Henry Newton Knights	Co. Conservative
Camberwell North-West	Thomas Macnamara	Coalition Liberal
Camborne	Francis Dyke Acland	Liberal
Cambridge	Sir Eric Geddes	Co. Conservative
Cambridgeshire	Hon. Edwin Montagu	Coalition Liberal
Cambridge University	Sir Joseph Larmor	Co. Conservative
Cambridge University	John Rawlinson	Co. Conservative
Cannock	James Parker	Coalition Labour
Canterbury	Ronald McNeill	Co. Conservative
Cardiff Central	James Childs Gould	Conservative
Cardiff East	Sir William Seager	Liberal
Cardiff South	Herbert Cory	Conservative
Cardiganshire	Matthew Vaughan-Davies	Coalition Liberal
Carlisle	Theodore Carr	Coalition Liberal
County Carlow	James Lennon	Sinn Féin
Carmarthen	John Hinds	Coalition Liberal
Carnarvon Boroughs	David Lloyd George	Coalition Liberal
Carnarvonshire	Charles Breese	Coalition Liberal
Cavan East	Arthur Griffith	Sinn Féin
Cavan West	Peter Paul Galligan	Sinn Féin
Chatham	John Moore-Brabazon	Conservative
Chelmsford	E. G. Pretyman	Co. Conservative
Chelsea	Sir Samuel Hoare, Bt	Co. Conservative
Cheltenham	Sir James Agg-Gardner	Co. Conservative
Chertsey	Donald Macmaster	Co. Conservative
Chester	Sir Owen Philipps	Co. Conservative
Chesterfield	Barnet Kenyon	Liberal
Chester-le-Street	John Wilkinson Taylor	Labour
Chichester	Edmund Talbot	Co. Conservative
Chippenham	George Terrell	Co. Conservative
Chislehurst	Alfred Smithers	Co. Conservative
Chorley	Douglas Hacking	Co. Conservative
Cirencester and Tewkesbury	Thomas Davies	Co. Conservative
City of London (Two members)	Sir Frederick Banbury, Bt	Co. Conservative
City of London (Two members)	Arthur Balfour	Co. Conservative
Clapham	Sir Arthur du Cros, Bt	Co. Conservative
Clare East	Éamon de Valera	Sinn Féin
Clare West	Brian O'Higgins	Sinn Féin
Clay Cross	Thomas Broad	Coalition Liberal
Cleveland	Sir Park Goff	Co. Conservative
Clitheroe	Alfred Davies	Labour
Coatbridge	A. L. H. Buchanan	Co. Conservative
Colchester	Sir Laming Worthington-Evans, Bt	Co. Conservative
Colne Valley	Frederick Mallalieu	Coalition Liberal
Combined English Universities (Two members)	Sir Martin Conway	Co. Conservative
Combined English Universities (Two members)	H. A. L. Fisher	Coalition Liberal
Combined Scottish Universities (Three members)	Sir William Cheyne, Bt	Co. Conservative
Combined Scottish Universities (Three members)	Dugald Cowan	Coalition Liberal
Combined Scottish Universities (Three members)	Sir Henry Craik	Co. Conservative
Consett	Aneurin Williams	Liberal
Cork City (Two members)	Liam de Róiste	Sinn Féin
Cork City (Two members)	J. J. Walsh	Sinn Féin
County Cork East	David Kent	Sinn Féin
County Cork Mid	Terence MacSwiney	Sinn Féin
County Cork North	Patrick O'Keeffe	Sinn Féin
County Cork North East	Thomas Hunter	Sinn Féin
County Cork South	Michael Collins	Sinn Féin
County Cork South East	Diarmuid Lynch	Sinn Féin
County Cork West	Seán Hayes	Sinn Féin
Cornwall North	Sir George Marks	Coalition Liberal
Coventry	Edward Manville	Co. Conservative
Crewe	Joseph Davies	Coalition Liberal
Croydon North	George Borwick	Co. Conservative
Croydon South	Ian Malcolm	Co. Conservative
Cumberland North	Christopher Lowther	Co. Conservative
== D ==
Darlington	Herbert Pease	Co. Conservative
Dartford	James Rowlands	Coalition Liberal
Darwen	Sir John Rutherford, Bt	Co. Conservative
Daventry	Hon. Edward FitzRoy	Co. Conservative
Denbigh	Sir David Davies	Coalition Liberal
Deptford	C. W. Bowerman	Labour
Derby (Two members)	J. H. Thomas	Labour
Derby (Two members)	Albert Green	Conservative
Derbyshire North East	Stanley Holmes	Liberal
Derbyshire South	Holman Gregory	Coalition Liberal
Derbyshire West	Charles Frederick White	Liberal
Devizes	Cory Bell	Co. Conservative
Dewsbury	Emil Pickering	Co. Conservative
Doncaster	Reginald Nicholson	Coalition Liberal
Don Valley	James Walton	Coalition NDP
Donegal East	Edward Kelly	Irish Nationalist
Donegal North	Joseph O'Doherty	Sinn Féin
Donegal South	Peter J. Ward	Sinn Féin
Donegal West	Joseph Sweeney	Sinn Féin
Down East	David Reid	Irish Unionist
Down Mid	Sir James Craig, Bt	Irish Unionist
Down North	Thomas Watters Brown	Irish Unionist
Down South	Jeremiah McVeagh	Irish Nationalist
Down West	Daniel Martin Wilson	Irish Unionist
Dorset East	Hon. Freddie Guest	Coalition Liberal
Dorset North	Philip Colfox	Co. Conservative
Dorset South	Angus Hambro	Co. Conservative
Dorset West	Sir Robert Williams, Bt	Co. Conservative
Dover	Viscount Duncannon	Co. Conservative
Dublin Clontarf	Richard Mulcahy	Sinn Féin
Dublin College Green	Seán T. O'Kelly	Sinn Féin
Dublin County North	Frank Lawless	Sinn Féin
Dublin County South	George Gavan Duffy	Sinn Féin
Dublin Harbour	Philip Shanahan	Sinn Féin
Dublin Pembroke	Desmond FitzGerald	Sinn Féin
Dublin Rathmines	Sir Maurice Dockrell	Irish Unionist
Dublin St James's	Joseph McGrath	Sinn Féin
Dublin St Michan's	Michael Staines	Sinn Féin
Dublin St Patrick's	Constance Markievicz	Sinn Féin
Dublin St Stephen's Green	Thomas Kelly	Sinn Féin
Dublin University	Arthur Samuels	Irish Unionist
Dublin University	Sir Robert Woods	Ind. Unionist
Dudley	Sir Arthur Griffith-Boscawen	Co. Conservative
Dulwich	Sir Frederick Hall	Co. Conservative
Dumbarton Burghs	John Taylor	Coalition Liberal
Dumfriesshire	William Murray	Co. Conservative
Dunbartonshire	William Raeburn	Co. Conservative
Dundee (Two members)	Winston Churchill	Coalition Liberal
Dundee (Two members)	Alexander Wilkie	Labour
Dunfermline Burghs	John Wallace	Coalition Liberal
Durham	John Hills	Co. Conservative
== E ==
Ealing	Sir Herbert Nield	Co. Conservative
Eastbourne	Rupert Gwynne	Co. Conservative
East Grinstead	Henry Cautley	Co. Conservative
East Ham North	Sir John Bethell, Bt	Coalition Liberal
East Ham South	Clement Edwards	Coalition NDP
Ebbw Vale	Thomas Richards	Labour
Eccles	Marshall Stevens	Co. Conservative
Eddisbury	Harry Barnston	Co. Conservative
Edinburgh Central	William Graham	Labour
Edinburgh East	James Hogge	Liberal
Edinburgh North	James Avon Clyde	Co. Conservative
Edinburgh South	Charles Murray	Co. Conservative
Edinburgh West	John Gordon Jameson	Co. Conservative
Edmonton	Sir Alfred Warren	Co. Conservative
Elland	George Taylor Ramsden	Co. Conservative
Enfield	Henry Bowles	Co. Conservative
Epping	Richard Colvin	Co. Conservative
Epsom	George Blades	Co. Conservative
Essex South East	Frank Hilder	Co. Conservative
Evesham	Bolton Eyres-Monsell	Co. Conservative
Exeter	Sir Robert Newman, Bt	Co. Conservative
Eye	Alexander Lyle-Samuel	Coalition Liberal
== F ==
Fareham	John Davidson	Co. Conservative
Farnham	Arthur Samuel	Co. Conservative
Farnworth	Edward Bagley	Conservative
Faversham	Granville Wheler	Co. Conservative
Fermanagh North	Edward Archdale	Irish Unionist
Fermanagh South	Seán O'Mahony	Sinn Féin
Fife East	Sir Alexander Sprot, Bt	Conservative
Fife West	William Adamson	Labour
Finchley	John Pretyman Newman	Co. Conservative
Finsbury	Martin Archer-Shee	Co. Conservative
Flintshire	Tom Parry	Coalition Liberal
Forest of Dean	James Wignall	Labour
Forfarshire	William T. Shaw	Conservative
Frome	Percy Hurd	Co. Conservative
Fulham East	Sir Henry Norris	Co. Conservative
Fulham West	Sir Cyril Cobb	Co. Conservative
Fylde	Wilfrid Ashley	Co. Conservative
== G ==
Gainsborough	John Molson	Co. Conservative
Galloway	Gilbert McMicking	Coalition Liberal
Galway Connemara	Pádraic Ó Máille	Sinn Féin
Galway East	Liam Mellows	Sinn Féin
Galway North	Bryan Cusack	Sinn Féin
Galway South	Frank Fahy	Sinn Féin
Gateshead	Herbert Surtees	Co. Conservative
Gillingham	Gerald Hohler	Co. Conservative
Glasgow Bridgeton	MacCallum Scott	Coalition Liberal
Glasgow Camlachie	Halford Mackinder	Co. Conservative
Glasgow Cathcart	John Pratt	Coalition Liberal
Glasgow Central	Bonar Law	Co. Conservative
Glasgow Gorbals	George Barnes	Coalition Labour
Glasgow Govan	Neil Maclean	Labour
Glasgow Hillhead	Sir Robert Horne	Co. Conservative
Glasgow Kelvingrove	John MacLeod	Co. Conservative
Glasgow Maryhill	Sir William Mitchell-Thomson, Bt	Co. Conservative
Glasgow Partick	Sir Robert Balfour, Bt	Coalition Liberal
Glasgow Pollok	John Gilmour	Co. Conservative
Glasgow St. Rollox	Hon. Gideon Oliphant-Murray	Co. Conservative
Glasgow Shettleston	T. B. S. Adair	Co. Conservative
Glasgow Springburn	F. A. Macquisten	Co. Conservative
Glasgow Tradeston	Vivian Henderson	Co. Conservative
Gloucester	Sir James Bruton	Co. Conservative
Gower	John Williams	Labour
Grantham	Edmund Royds	Co. Conservative
Gravesend	Alexander Richardson	Co. Conservative
Great Yarmouth	Sir Arthur Fell	Co. Conservative
Greenock	Godfrey Collins	Liberal
Greenwich	Ion Hamilton Benn	Co. Conservative
Grimsby	Thomas Tickler	Co. Conservative
Guildford	Edgar Horne	Co. Conservative
== H ==
Hackney Central	William Woolcock	Coalition Liberal
Hackney North	Raymond Greene	Co. Conservative
Hackney South	Horatio Bottomley	Independent
Halifax	John Henry Whitley	Coalition Liberal
Hamilton	Duncan Graham	Labour
Hammersmith North	Henry Foreman	Co. Conservative
Hammersmith South	William Bull	Co. Conservative
Hampstead	George Balfour	Co. Conservative
Hanley	James Seddon	Coalition NDP
Harborough	Sir Keith Fraser, Bt	Co. Conservative
Harrow	Oswald Mosley	Co. Conservative
The Hartlepools	W. G. Howard Gritten	Conservative
Harwich	Harry Newton	Co. Conservative
Hastings	Laurance Lyon	Co. Conservative
Hemel Hempstead	Gustavus Talbot	Co. Conservative
Hemsworth	John Guest	Labour
Hendon	Philip Lloyd-Greame	Co. Conservative
Henley	Reginald Terrell	Co. Conservative
Hereford	Charles Pulley	Co. Conservative
Hertford	Noel Pemberton Billing	Silver Badge
Hexham	Clifton Brown	Co. Conservative
Heywood and Radcliffe	Albert Illingworth	Coalition Liberal
High Peak	Samuel Hill-Wood	Co. Conservative
Hitchin	Robert Cecil	Co. Conservative
Holborn	Sir James Remnant, Bt	Co. Conservative
Holderness	Stanley Wilson	Co. Conservative
Holland-with-Boston	William Royce	Labour
Honiton	Clive Morrison-Bell	Co. Conservative
Horncastle	William Weigall	Co. Conservative
Hornsey	Kennedy Jones	Co. Conservative
Horsham and Worthing	The Earl Winterton	Co. Conservative
Houghton-le-Spring	Robert Richardson	Labour
Howdenshire	Stanley Jackson	Co. Conservative
Huddersfield	Charles Sykes	Coalition Liberal
Huntingdonshire	Oliver Locker-Lampson	Co. Conservative
Hythe	Sir Philip Sassoon, Bt	Co. Conservative
== I ==
Ilford	Sir William Griggs	Co. Conservative
Ilkeston	J. E. B. Seely	Coalition Liberal
Ince	Stephen Walsh	Labour
Inverness	Thomas Morison	Coalition Liberal
Ipswich	John Ganzoni	Co. Conservative
Isle of Ely	Colin Coote	Coalition Liberal
Isle of Thanet	Norman Craig	Co. Conservative
Isle of Wight	Douglas Hall	Co. Conservative
Islington East	Alfred Raper	Co. Conservative
Islington North	Sir Newton Moore	Co. Conservative
Islington South	Sir Charles Higham	Co. Conservative
Islington West	Sir George Elliott	Co. Conservative
== J ==
Jarrow	Godfrey Palmer	Coalition Liberal
== K ==
Keighley	Robert Clough	Co. Conservative
Kennington	Henry Purchase	Coalition Liberal
Kensington North	Alan Burgoyne	Co. Conservative
Kensington South	Sir William Davison	Co. Conservative
Kerry East	Piaras Béaslaí	Sinn Féin
Kerry North	James Crowley	Sinn Féin
Kerry South	Fionán Lynch	Sinn Féin
Kerry West	Austin Stack	Sinn Féin
Kettering	Alfred Waterson	Co-operative -> Labour
Kidderminster	Eric Knight	Co. Conservative
Kildare North	Domhnall Ua Buachalla	Sinn Féin
Kildare South	Art O'Connor	Sinn Féin
Kilkenny North	W. T. Cosgrave	Sinn Féin
Kilkenny South	James O'Mara	Sinn Féin
Kilmarnock	Hon. Alexander Shaw	Coalition Liberal
King's County	Patrick McCartan	Sinn Féin
King's Lynn	Neville Jodrell	Co. Conservative
Kingston upon Hull Central	Sir Mark Sykes, Bt	Co. Conservative
Kingston upon Hull East	Charles Murchison	Co. Conservative
Kingston upon Hull North West	Lambert Ward	Conservative
Kingston upon Hull South West	Cyril Entwistle	Liberal
Kingston-upon-Thames	John Gordon Drummond Campbell	Co. Conservative
Kingswinford	Charles Sitch	Labour
Kinross & West Perthshire	James Gardiner	Liberal
Kirkcaldy Burghs	Sir James Dalziel	Coalition Liberal
Knutsford	Sir Alan Sykes, Bt	Co. Conservative
== L ==
Lambeth North	Frank Briant	Liberal
Lanark	Walter Elliot	Co. Conservative
Lanarkshire North	Robert McLaren	Co. Conservative
Lancaster	Sir Archibald Hunter	Co. Conservative
Leeds Central	Robert Armitage	Coalition Liberal
Leeds North	Alexander Farquharson	Coalition Liberal
Leeds North East	Sir John Birchall	Co. Conservative
Leeds South	William Middlebrook	Coalition Liberal
Leeds South East	James O'Grady	Labour
Leeds West	John Murray	Coalition Liberal
Leek	William Bromfield	Labour
Leicester East	Sir Gordon Hewart	Coalition Liberal
Leicester South	Thomas Blane	Co. Conservative
Leicester West	Joseph Frederick Green	Coalition NDP
Leigh	Peter Raffan	Liberal
Leith	William Wedgwood Benn	Liberal
Leitrim	James Dolan	Sinn Féin
Leominster	Charles Ward-Jackson	Co. Conservative
Lewes	William Campion	Co. Conservative
Lewisham East	Sir Assheton Pownall	Co. Conservative
Lewisham West	Sir Edward Coates	Co. Conservative
Leyton East	Cecil Malone	Coalition Liberal
Leyton West	Harry Wrightson	Co. Conservative
Lichfield	Sir Courtenay Warner, Bt	Coalition Liberal
Limerick City	Michael Collivet	Sinn Féin
Limerick East	Richard Hayes	Sinn Féin
Limerick West	Con Collins	Sinn Féin
Lincoln	Alfred Davies	Co. Conservative
Linlithgow	James Kidd	Co. Conservative
Liverpool East Toxteth	James Stuart Rankin	Co. Conservative
Liverpool Edge Hill	William Rutherford	Co. Conservative
Liverpool Everton	John Harmood-Banner	Co. Conservative
Liverpool Exchange	Leslie Scott	Co. Conservative
Liverpool Fairfield	Jack Cohen	Conservative
Liverpool Kirkdale	De Fonblanque Pennefather	Co. Conservative
Liverpool Scotland	T. P. O'Connor	Irish Nationalist
Liverpool Walton	Warden Chilcott	Co. Conservative
Liverpool Wavertree	Nathan Raw	Co. Conservative
Liverpool West Derby	Sir F. E. Smith	Co. Conservative
Liverpool West Toxteth	Robert Houston	Co. Conservative
Llandaff and Barry	William Cope	Co. Conservative
Llanelli	Towyn Jones	Coalition Liberal
London University	Sir Philip Magnus, Bt	Co. Conservative
Londonderry City	Eoin MacNeill	Sinn Féin
Londonderry North	Hugh Anderson	Irish Unionist
Londonderry South	Denis Henry	Irish Unionist
Longford	Joseph McGuinness	Sinn Féin
Lonsdale	Claude Lowther	Co. Conservative
Loughborough	Hon. Oscar Guest	Coalition Liberal
Louth	John J. O'Kelly	Sinn Féin
Louth (Lincolnshire)	Langton Brackenbury	Co. Conservative
Lowestoft	Sir Edward Beauchamp, Bt	Coalition Liberal
Ludlow	Sir Beville Stanier, Bt	Co. Conservative
Luton	Cecil Harmsworth	Coalition Liberal
== M ==
Macclesfield	John Remer	Co. Conservative
Maidstone	Carlyon Bellairs	Co. Conservative
Maldon	Sir James Fortescue Flannery, Bt	Co. Conservative
Manchester Ardwick	Augustine Hailwood	Co. Conservative
Manchester Blackley	Harold Briggs	Conservative
Manchester Clayton	Edward Hopkinson	Conservative
Manchester Exchange	Sir John Randles	Co. Conservative
Manchester Gorton	John Hodge	Labour
Manchester Hulme	Joseph Nall	Conservative
Manchester Moss Side	Gerald Hurst	Conservative
Manchester Platting	J. R. Clynes	Labour
Manchester Rusholme	Robert Burdon Stoker	Co. Conservative
Manchester Withington	Alfred Deakin Carter	Conservative
Mansfield	William Carter	Labour
Mayo East	Éamon de Valera	Sinn Féin
Mayo North	John Crowley	Sinn Féin
Mayo South	William Sears	Sinn Féin
Mayo West	Joseph MacBride	Sinn Féin
Meath North	Liam Mellows	Sinn Féin
Meath South	Eamonn Duggan	Sinn Féin
Melton	Charles Yate	Co. Conservative
Merionethshire	Sir Henry Haydn Jones	Liberal
Merthyr	Sir Edgar Jones	Coalition Liberal
Middlesbrough East	Penry Williams	Liberal
Middlesbrough West	Trevelyan Thomson	Liberal
Middleton and Prestwich	Sir Ryland Adkins	Coalition Liberal
Midlothian North	Sir John Hope, Bt	Co. Conservative
Midlothian South and Peebles	Sir Donald Maclean	Liberal
Mitcham	Thomas Worsfold	Co. Conservative
Monaghan North	Ernest Blythe	Sinn Féin
Monaghan South	Seán MacEntee	Sinn Féin
Monmouth	Leolin Forestier-Walker	Conservative
Montgomeryshire	David Davies	Liberal
Montrose Burghs	John Sturrock	Coalition Liberal
Moray & Nairn	Sir Archibald Williamson, Bt	Coalition Liberal
Morpeth	John Cairns	Labour
Mossley	Austin Hopkinson	Coalition Liberal
Motherwell	Robert Nelson	Co. Conservative
== N ==
National University of Ireland	Eoin MacNeill	Sinn Féin
Neath	Hugh Edwards	Coalition Liberal
Nelson and Colne	Albert Smith	Labour
Newark	John Starkey	Co. Conservative
Newbury	William Mount	Co. Conservative
Newcastle-under-Lyme	Josiah Wedgwood	Independent Liberal -> Labour
Newcastle-upon-Tyne Central	George Renwick	Co. Conservative
Newcastle-upon-Tyne East	Harry Barnes	Coalition Liberal
Newcastle-upon-Tyne North	Nicholas Grattan-Doyle	Co. Conservative
Newcastle-upon-Tyne West	Edward Shortt	Coalition Liberal
New Forest and Christchurch	Walter Perkins	Co. Conservative
Newport	Lewis Haslam	Coalition Liberal
Newton	Robert Young	Labour
Norfolk East	Michael Falcon	Co. Conservative
Norfolk North	Douglas King	Coalition Independent
Norfolk South	Hon. William Cozens-Hardy	Liberal
Norfolk South West	Sir Richard Winfrey	Coalition Liberal
Normanton	Frederick Hall	Labour
Northampton	Charles McCurdy	Coalition Liberal
Northwich	Harry Dewhurst	Co. Conservative
Norwich (Two members)	Hilton Young	Liberal
Norwich (Two members)	George Roberts	Coalition Labour
Norwood	Sir Harry Samuel	Co. Conservative
Nottingham Central	Albert Atkey	Co. Conservative
Nottingham East	Sir John Rees	Co. Conservative
Nottingham South	Lord Henry Cavendish-Bentinck	Co. Conservative
Nottingham West	Arthur Hayday	Labour
Nuneaton	Henry Maddocks	Co. Conservative
== O ==
Ogmore	Vernon Hartshorn	Labour
Oldham (Two members)	Sir William Barton	Coalition Liberal
Oldham (Two members)	Edmund Denniss	Co. Conservative
Orkney and Shetland	Cathcart Wason	Coalition Liberal
Ormskirk	James Bell	Labour
Oswestry	William Bridgeman	Co. Conservative
Oxford	John Marriott	Co. Conservative
Oxford University	Lord Hugh Cecil	Co. Conservative
Oxford University	Rowland Prothero	Co. Conservative
== P ==
Paddington North	William Perring	Co. Conservative
Paddington South	Sir Henry Percy Harris	Co. Conservative
Paisley	Sir John McCallum	Liberal
Peckham	Sir Albion Richardson	Coalition Liberal
Pembrokeshire	Sir Evan Jones, Bt	Coalition Liberal
Penistone	Sydney Arnold	Liberal
Penrith and Cockermouth	James Lowther	Co. Conservative
Penryn and Falmouth	Sir Edward Nicholl	Co. Conservative
Perth	William Young	Coalition Liberal
Peterborough	Henry Brassey	Co. Conservative
Petersfield	William Graham Nicholson	Co. Conservative
Plymouth Devonport	Clement Kinloch-Cooke	Co. Conservative
Plymouth Drake	Sir Arthur Benn	Co. Conservative
Plymouth Sutton	Hon. Waldorf Astor	Co. Conservative
Pontefract	Sir Joseph Compton-Rickett	Coalition Liberal
Pontypool	Thomas Griffiths	Labour
Pontypridd	Thomas Arthur Lewis	Coalition Liberal
Poplar South	Sir Alfred William Yeo	Coalition Liberal
Portsmouth Central	Sir Thomas Bramsdon	Liberal
Portsmouth North	Sir Bertram Falle, Bt	Co. Conservative
Portsmouth South	Herbert Cayzer	Co. Conservative
Preston (Two members)	Hon. George Stanley	Co. Conservative
Preston (Two members)	Thomas Shaw	Labour
Pudsey and Otley	Arthur Barrand	Coalition Liberal
Putney	Samuel Samuel	Co. Conservative
== Q ==
Queen's County	Kevin O'Higgins	Sinn Féin
Queen's University of Belfast	Sir William Whitla	Irish Unionist
== R ==
Reading	Leslie Wilson	Co. Conservative
Reigate	George Cockerill	Co. Conservative
Renfrewshire East	Joseph Johnstone	Coalition Liberal
Renfrewshire West	James Greig	Coalition Liberal
Rhondda East	David Watts-Morgan	Labour
Rhondda West	William Abraham	Labour
Richmond (Yorkshire)	Murrough Wilson	Co. Conservative
Richmond upon Thames	Clifford Edgar	Co. Conservative
Ripon	Hon. Edward Wood	Co. Conservative
Rochdale	Alfred Law	Co. Conservative
Romford	Albert Edward Martin	Coalition Liberal
Roscommon North	George Noble Plunkett	Sinn Féin
Roscommon South	Harry Boland	Sinn Féin
Ross and Cromarty	Ian Macpherson	Coalition Liberal
Rossendale	Robert Waddington	Co. Conservative
Rotherham	Frederic Kelley	Conservative
Rotherhithe	John Lort-Williams	Co. Conservative
Rother Valley	Thomas Walter Grundy	Labour
Rothwell	William Lunn	Labour
Roxburgh and Selkirk	Robert Munro	Coalition Liberal
Royton	Wilfrid Sugden	Co. Conservative
Rugby	John Baird	Co. Conservative
Rushcliffe	Henry Betterton	Co. Conservative
Rutland and Stamford	Hon. Claud Heathcote-Drummond-Willoughby	Co. Conservative
Rutherglen	Adam Keir Rodger	Coalition Liberal
Rye	George Courthope	Co. Conservative
== S ==
Saffron Walden	Cecil Beck	Coalition Liberal
St Albans	Sir Hildred Carlile, Bt	Co. Conservative
St Helens	James Sexton	Labour
St Ives	Sir Clifford Cory, Bt	Coalition Liberal
St Marylebone	Sir Samuel Scott, Bt	Co. Conservative
St Pancras North	John Lorden	Co. Conservative
St Pancras South East	John Hopkins	Conservative
St Pancras South West	Richard Barnett	Co. Conservative
Salford North	Ben Tillett	Labour
Salford South	Sir Anderson Montague-Barlow	Co. Conservative
Salford West	Fred Astbury	Conservative
Salisbury	Hugh Morrison	Co. Conservative
Scarborough and Whitby	Gervase Beckett	Co. Conservative
Seaham	Evan Hayward	Liberal
Sedgefield	Rowland Burdon	Co. Conservative
Sevenoaks	Thomas Jewell Bennett	Co. Conservative
Sheffield Attercliffe	Thomas Worrall Casey	Coalition Liberal
Sheffield Brightside	Sir Tudor Walters	Coalition Liberal
Sheffield Central	James Hope	Co. Conservative
Sheffield Ecclesall	Samuel Roberts	Co. Conservative
Sheffield Hallam	Douglas Vickers	Co. Conservative
Sheffield Hillsborough	Arthur Neal	Coalition Liberal
Sheffield Park	Henry Stephenson	Coalition Liberal
Shipley	Norman Rae	Coalition Liberal
Shoreditch	Christopher Addison	Coalition Liberal
Shrewsbury	George Butler Lloyd	Co. Conservative
Skipton	Richard Roundell	Co. Conservative
Sligo North	J. J. Clancy	Sinn Féin
Sligo South	Alexander McCabe	Sinn Féin
Smethwick	John Davison	Labour
Southampton (Two members)	Sir Ivor Philipps	Coalition Liberal
Southampton (Two members)	William Dudley Ward	Coalition Liberal
Southend-on-Sea	Hon. Rupert Guinness	Co. Conservative
Southport	Godfrey Dalrymple-White	Co. Conservative
South Molton	George Lambert	Liberal
South Shields	Havelock Wilson	Coalition Liberal
Southwark Central	James Daniel Gilbert	Coalition Liberal
Southwark North	Edward Strauss	Coalition Liberal
Southwark South East	James Dawes	Coalition Liberal
Sowerby	Robert Hewitt Barker	NADSS
Spelthorne	Philip Pilditch	Co. Conservative
Spennymoor	Samuel Galbraith	Liberal
Spen Valley	Sir Thomas Whittaker	Coalition Liberal
Stafford	Hon. William Ormsby-Gore	Co. Conservative
Stalybridge and Hyde	Sir John Wood, Bt	Conservative
Stepney Limehouse	Sir William Pearce	Coalition Liberal
Stepney Mile End	Sir Walter Preston	Co. Conservative
Stirling and Falkirk Burghs	John Macdonald	Liberal
Stirlingshire East and Clackmannan	Ralph Glyn	Co. Conservative
Stirlingshire West	Harry Hope	Co. Conservative
Stockport (Two members)	George Wardle	Coalition Labour
Stockport (Two members)	Spencer Leigh Hughes	Coalition Liberal
Stockton on Tees	Bertrand Watson	Coalition Liberal
Stoke Newington	George Jones	Co. Conservative
Stoke-on-Trent	John Ward	Coalition Liberal
Stone	Sir Smith Child, Bt	Co. Conservative
Stourbridge	John William Wilson	Liberal
Streatham	William Lane-Mitchell	Co. Conservative
Stretford	Thomas Robinson	Coalition Liberal
Stroud	Sir Ashton Lister	Coalition Liberal
Sudbury	Stephen Howard	Liberal
Sunderland (Two members)	Sir Hamar Greenwood, Bt	Coalition Liberal
Sunderland (Two members)	Ralph Hudson	Conservative
Surrey East	Sir Stuart Coats, Bt	Co. Conservative
Swansea East	Jeremiah Williams	Coalition Liberal
Swansea West	Sir Alfred Mond, Bt	Coalition Liberal
Swindon	Sir Frederick William Young	Co. Conservative
== T ==
Tamworth	Henry Wilson-Fox	Co. Conservative
Taunton	Dennis Boles	Co. Conservative
Tavistock	Charles Williams	Co. Conservative
Thirsk and Malton	Edmund Turton	Co. Conservative
Thornbury	Athelstan Rendall	Coalition Liberal
Tipperary East	Pierce McCan	Sinn Féin
Tipperary Mid	Séamus Burke	Sinn Féin
Tipperary North	Joseph MacDonagh	Sinn Féin
Tipperary South	P. J. Moloney	Sinn Féin
Tiverton	Charles Carew	Co. Conservative
Tonbridge	Herbert Spender-Clay	Co. Conservative
Torquay	Charles Burn	Co. Conservative
Totnes	Francis Mildmay	Co. Conservative
Tottenham North	William Prescott	Co. Conservative
Tottenham South	Patrick Malone	Conservative
Twickenham	William Joynson-Hicks	Co. Conservative
Tynemouth	Charles Percy	Co. Conservative
Tyrone North-East	Thomas Harbison	Irish Nationalist
Tyrone North-West	Arthur Griffith	Sinn Féin
Tyrone South	William Coote	Irish Unionist
== U ==
University of Wales	Herbert Lewis	Coalition Liberal
Uxbridge	Hon. Sidney Peel	Co. Conservative
== W ==
Wakefield	Sir Edward Brotherton, Bt	Co. Conservative
Wallasey	Bouverie McDonald	Co. Conservative
Wallsend	Matthew Simm	Coalition NDP
Walsall	Sir Richard Cooper, Bt	National Party
Walthamstow East	Sir Stanley Johnson	Co. Conservative
Walthamstow West	Charles Jesson	Coalition NDP
Wandsworth Central	Sir John Norton-Griffiths	Conservative
Wansbeck	Robert Mason	Coalition Liberal
Warrington	Harold Smith	Co. Conservative
Warwick and Leamington	Ernest Pollock	Co. Conservative
County Waterford	Cathal Brugha	Sinn Féin
Waterford City	William Redmond	Irish Nationalist
Waterloo	Albert Buckley	Co. Conservative
Watford	Dennis Herbert	Co. Conservative
Wednesbury	Alfred Short	Labour
Wellingborough	Walter Smith	Labour
Wells	Harry Greer	Co. Conservative
Wentworth	George Harry Hirst	Labour
West Bromwich	Frederick Roberts	Labour
Westbury	George Palmer	Co. Conservative
Western Isles	Donald Murray	Liberal
West Ham Plaistow	Will Thorne	Labour
West Ham Silvertown	Jack Jones	National Socialist Party
West Ham Stratford	Leonard Lyle	Co. Conservative
West Ham Upton	Sir Ernest Wild	Co. Conservative
Westhoughton	William Wilson	Labour
Westmeath	Laurence Ginnell	Sinn Féin
Westminster Abbey	William Burdett-Coutts	Co. Conservative
Westminster St George's	Walter Long	Co. Conservative
Westmorland	John Weston	Co. Conservative
Weston-super-Mare	Sir Gilbert Wills, Bt	Co. Conservative
Wexford North	Roger Sweetman	Sinn Féin
Wexford South	James Ryan	Sinn Féin
Whitechapel and St George's	James Kiley	Liberal
Whitehaven	James Augustus Grant	Co. Conservative
Wicklow East	Seán Etchingham	Sinn Féin
Wicklow West	Robert Barton	Sinn Féin
Widnes	William Walker	Co. Conservative
Wigan	John Parkinson	Labour
Willesden East	Harry Mallaby-Deeley	Co. Conservative
Willesden West	Charles Pinkham	Co. Conservative
Wimbledon	Joseph Hood	Co. Conservative
Winchester	George Hennessy	Co. Conservative
Windsor	Ernest Gardner	Co. Conservative
Wirral	Gershom Stewart	Co. Conservative
Wolverhampton Bilston	T. E. Hickman	Co. Conservative
Wolverhampton East	George Thorne	Liberal
Wolverhampton West	Alfred Bird	Co. Conservative
Woodbridge	Robert Francis Peel	Co. Conservative
Wood Green	Godfrey Locker-Lampson	Co. Conservative
Woolwich East	Will Crooks	Labour
Woolwich West	Sir Kingsley Wood	Co. Conservative
Worcester	Sir Edward Goulding	Co. Conservative
Workington	Thomas Cape	Labour
The Wrekin	Sir Charles Henry, Bt	Coalition Liberal
Wrexham	Sir Robert Thomas, Bt	Coalition Liberal
Wycombe	William Baring du Pré	Co. Conservative
== Y ==
Yeovil	Hon. Aubrey Herbert	Co. Conservative
York	Sir John Butcher	Co. Conservative

== By-elections ==
=== Seats vacant on dissolution ===
Eight seats were vacant when Parliament was dissolved prior to the 1922 general election:

- Tipperary East--Pierce McCan (Sinn Féin) died 6 March 1919
- Cork Mid--Terence MacSwiney (Sinn Féin) died 25 October 1920
- Dublin North--Frank Lawless (Sinn Féin) died 16 April 1922
- Longford--Joseph McGuinness (Sinn Féin) died 31 May 1922
- County Waterford--Cathal Brugha (Sinn Féin) died 7 July 1922
- Roscommon South--Harry Boland (Sinn Féin) died 2 August 1922
- Cavan East--Arthur Griffith (Sinn Féin) died 12 August 1922
- Cork South--Michael Collins (Sinn Féin) died 22 August 1922

These 5 seats formed part of Southern Ireland, envisaged by the Government of Ireland Act 1920, and were to be part of the forthcoming Irish Free State, as envisaged by the Anglo-Irish Treaty of 1921, and thus were not part of the 1922 House of Commons election.

- Tyrone North-West--Arthur Griffith (Sinn Féin) died 12 August 1922 – seat replaced by Fermanagh and Tyrone for the House of Commons 1922 election.

== Changes ==
=== 1921 ===
- May: Unionist MPs in Northern Ireland are classified in this article as Ulster Unionists instead of Irish Unionists, due to the implementation of the Government of Ireland Act 1920 and the partition of Ireland.

== Lists ==
- List of MPs for constituencies in Wales (1918–1922)

== Sources ==
- Walker, Brian M., ed. (1978). Parliamentary Election Results in Ireland, 1801–1922. Dublin: Royal Irish Academy. ISBN 0901714127.
- Craig, F.W.S., ed. (1977). British Parliamentary Election Results 1918–1949. Macmillan.
- Stenton, M.; Lees, S., eds. (1979). Who's Who of British members of parliament: Volume III 1919–1945. The Harvester Press.
