= Redistribution of Seats (Ireland) Act 1918 =

Act of the Parliament of the United Kingdom

Redistribution of Seats (Ireland) Act 1918 (Note: Section 10(1).)
- Act of Parliament
- Parliament of the United Kingdom
- Long title: An Act to provide for the Redistribution of Seats at Parliamentary Elections in Ireland and for purposes connected therewith.
- Citation: 7 & 8 Geo. 5. c. 65
- Territorial extent: United Kingdom

Dates
- Royal assent: 6 February 1918
- Commencement: 6 February 1918 (Note: Section 9.)
- Repealed: 21 December 1954
Other legislation
Repealed by	Elections and Franchise Act (Northern Ireland) 1946; Representation of the People Act 1948; Statute Law Revision Act (Northern Ireland) 1954
Relates to	Representation of the People Act 1918

Status: Repealed

Text of statute as originally enacted

The Redistribution of Seats (Ireland) Act 1918 (7 & 8 Geo. 5. c. 65) was an act of the Parliament of the United Kingdom which redistributed the parliamentary constituencies in Ireland for the House of Commons. It was enacted on the same day as the Representation of the People Act 1918 which extended the franchise throughout the United Kingdom.

The act replaced the distribution of seats which had been enacted by the Redistribution of Seats Act 1885 (48 & 49 Vict. c. 23) and had been in use since the general election of that year. The number of seats was increased from 103 to 105 (and the number of constituencies increased from 101 to 103) with the enfranchisement of two additional universities. The revision was based on a report of a Boundary Commission carried out in 1917 taking population changes in the 1911 census into account. It also followed administrative county boundaries, which in some cases had been altered under the Local Government (Ireland) Act 1898 (or in the case of Dublin, shortly after).

The new constituencies came into effect at the 1918 general election. Sinn Féin had adopted an abstentionist policy since its foundation, and none of its MPs elected in by-elections prior to this election had taken their seats. In its election manifesto, it called for the establishment of an assembly "comprising persons chosen by Irish constituencies as the supreme national authority to speak and act in the name of the Irish people", which would become the revolutionary Dáil Éireann. The First Dáil met in January 1919 and made a Declaration of Independence of the Irish Republic.

The constituencies in the 1918 act were superseded by those in the Government of Ireland Act 1920, which created separate home rule parliaments for Northern Ireland and Southern Ireland and reduced the Irish seats at Westminster from 105 to 46. The seats designated in the 1920 act for the Southern Ireland House of Commons and the Northern Ireland House of Commons were used as the 1921 election to the Second Dáil. Under the Irish Free State (Agreement) Act 1922, which gave the force of law to the Anglo-Irish Treaty, the seats designated for Westminster in the 1920 act would only apply in the six counties of Northern Ireland, taking effect at the 1922 general election. The remaining twenty-six Irish counties became the Irish Free State on 6 December 1922, ceasing to be part of the United Kingdom.

== Redistributed seats ==
=== Antrim === Representation increased from 8 to 13 MPs ‡ The parliamentary borough of Belfast was partly in County Down
Boroughs
1885 Act	Change	1918 Act
Belfast, East (1 MP)	Boundaries extended to include entire county borough. Divided into nine single-member divisions.	Belfast, Cromac (1 MP)
Belfast, East (1 MP)	Boundaries extended to include entire county borough. Divided into nine single-member divisions.	Belfast, Duncairn (1 MP)
Belfast, North (1 MP)	Boundaries extended to include entire county borough. Divided into nine single-member divisions.	Belfast, Falls (1 MP)
Belfast, North (1 MP)	Boundaries extended to include entire county borough. Divided into nine single-member divisions.	Belfast, Ormeau (1 MP)
Belfast, North (1 MP)	Boundaries extended to include entire county borough. Divided into nine single-member divisions.	Belfast, Pottinger (1 MP)
Belfast, South (1 MP)	Boundaries extended to include entire county borough. Divided into nine single-member divisions.	Belfast, St. Anne's (1 MP)
Belfast, South (1 MP)	Boundaries extended to include entire county borough. Divided into nine single-member divisions.	Belfast, Shankill (1 MP)
Belfast, West (1 MP)	Boundaries extended to include entire county borough. Divided into nine single-member divisions.	Belfast, Victoria (1 MP)
Belfast, West (1 MP)	Boundaries extended to include entire county borough. Divided into nine single-member divisions.	Belfast, Woodvale (1 MP)
County Divisions
1885 Act	Change	1918 Act
Antrim, East (1 MP)	Southern boundary of parliamentary county altered to align with administrative county.	Antrim, East (1 MP)
Antrim, Mid (1 MP)	Southern boundary of parliamentary county altered to align with administrative county.	Antrim, Mid (1 MP)
Antrim, North (1 MP)	Southern boundary of parliamentary county altered to align with administrative county.	Antrim, North (1 MP)
Antrim, South (1 MP)	Southern boundary of parliamentary county altered to align with administrative county.	Antrim, South (1 MP)
=== Armagh === Representation unchanged (3 MPs)
County Divisions
1885 Act	Change	1918 Act
Armagh, Mid (1 MP)	Boundaries of parliamentary county altered to align with administrative county.	Armagh, Mid (1 MP)
Armagh, North (1 MP)	Boundaries of parliamentary county altered to align with administrative county.	Armagh, North (1 MP)
Armagh, South (1 MP)	Boundaries of parliamentary county altered to align with administrative county.	Armagh, South (1 MP)
=== Carlow === Representation unchanged (1 MP)
County Division
1885 Act	Change	1918 Act
County Carlow (1 MP)	No change.	County Carlow (1 MP)
=== Cavan === Representation unchanged (2 MPs)
County Divisions
1885 Act	Change	1918 Act
Cavan, East (1 MP)	No change.	Cavan, East (1 MP)
Cavan, West (1 MP)	No change.	Cavan, West (1 MP)
=== Clare === Representation unchanged (2 MPs)
County Divisions
1885 Act	Change	1918 Act
Clare, East (1 MP)	Boundaries of parliamentary county altered to align with administrative county.	Clare, East (1 MP)
Clare, West (1 MP)	Boundaries of parliamentary county altered to align with administrative county.	Clare, West (1 MP)
=== Cork === Representation unchanged (9 MPs)
Boroughs
1885 Act	Change	1918 Act
Cork City (2 MPs)	No change	Cork City (2 MPs)
County Divisions
1885 Act	Change	1918 Act
Cork, East (1 MP)	No change.	Cork, East (1 MP)
Cork, Mid (1 MP)	No change.	Cork, Mid (1 MP)
Cork, North (1 MP)	No change.	Cork, North (1 MP)
Cork, North East (1 MP)	No change.	Cork, North East (1 MP)
Cork, South (1 MP)	No change.	Cork, South (1 MP)
Cork, South East (1 MP)	No change.	Cork, South East (1 MP)
Cork, West (1 MP)	No change.	Cork, West (1 MP)
=== Donegal === Representation unchanged (4 MPs)
County Divisions
1885 Act	Change	1918 Act
Donegal, East (1 MP)	No change.	Donegal, East (1 MP)
Donegal, North (1 MP)	No change.	Donegal, North (1 MP)
Donegal, South (1 MP)	No change.	Donegal, South (1 MP)
Donegal, West (1 MP)	No change.	Donegal, West (1 MP)
=== Down === Representation unchanged (5 MPs) ‡ The parliamentary borough of Newry was partly in County Armagh
Boroughs
1885 Act	Change	1918 Act
Newry (1 MP)	Abolished.	
County Divisions
1885 Act	Change	1918 Act
Down, East (1 MP)	Boundaries of parliamentary county altered to align with administrative county. The parliamentary borough of Newry was absorbed into South Down. Divided into five single-member divisions.	Down, East (1 MP)
Down, North (1 MP)	Boundaries of parliamentary county altered to align with administrative county. The parliamentary borough of Newry was absorbed into South Down. Divided into five single-member divisions.	Down, Mid (1 MP)
Down, North (1 MP)	Boundaries of parliamentary county altered to align with administrative county. The parliamentary borough of Newry was absorbed into South Down. Divided into five single-member divisions.	Down, North (1 MP)
Down, South (1 MP)	Boundaries of parliamentary county altered to align with administrative county. The parliamentary borough of Newry was absorbed into South Down. Divided into five single-member divisions.	Down, South (1 MP)
Down, West (1 MP)	Boundaries of parliamentary county altered to align with administrative county. The parliamentary borough of Newry was absorbed into South Down. Divided into five single-member divisions.	Down, West (1 MP)
=== Dublin === Representation increased from 6 to 11 MPs
County Divisions
1885 Act	Change	1918 Act
County Dublin, North (1 MP)	Boundaries of parliamentary county altered to align with administrative county. Divided into four single-member divisions.	County Dublin, North (1 MP)
County Dublin, North (1 MP)	Boundaries of parliamentary county altered to align with administrative county. Divided into four single-member divisions.	County Dublin, Pembroke (1 MP)
County Dublin, South (1 MP)	Boundaries of parliamentary county altered to align with administrative county. Divided into four single-member divisions.	County Dublin, Rathmines (1 MP)
County Dublin, South (1 MP)	Boundaries of parliamentary county altered to align with administrative county. Divided into four single-member divisions.	County Dublin, South (1 MP)
Boroughs
Before 1885	Change	After 1885
Dublin, College Green (1 MP)	Boundaries extended to include entire county borough. Divided into seven single-member divisions.	Dublin, Clontarf (1 MP)
Dublin, College Green (1 MP)	Boundaries extended to include entire county borough. Divided into seven single-member divisions.	Dublin, College Green (1 MP)
Dublin, Dublin Harbour (1 MP)	Boundaries extended to include entire county borough. Divided into seven single-member divisions.	Dublin, Dublin Harbour (1 MP)
Dublin, Dublin Harbour (1 MP)	Boundaries extended to include entire county borough. Divided into seven single-member divisions.	Dublin, St James's (1 MP)
Dublin, St Patrick's (1 MP)	Boundaries extended to include entire county borough. Divided into seven single-member divisions.	Dublin, St Michan's (1 MP)
Dublin, St Patrick's (1 MP)	Boundaries extended to include entire county borough. Divided into seven single-member divisions.	Dublin, St Patrick's (1 MP)
Dublin, St Stephen's Green (1 MP)	Boundaries extended to include entire county borough. Divided into seven single-member divisions.	Dublin, St Stephen's Green (1 MP)
=== Fermanagh === Representation unchanged (2 MPs)
County Divisions
1885 Act	Change	1918 Act
Fermanagh, North (1 MP)	No change.	Fermanagh, North (1 MP)
Fermanagh, South (1 MP)	No change.	Fermanagh, South (1 MP)
=== Galway === Representation reduced from 5 to 4 MPs
Boroughs
1885 Act	Change	1918 Act
Galway Borough (1 MP)	Abolished.	
County Divisions
1885 Act	Change	1918 Act
Galway, Connemara (1 MP)	Boundaries of parliamentary county altered to align with administrative county. The parliamentary borough of Galway was absorbed into Galway Connemara. Divided into four single-member divisions.	Galway, Connemara (1 MP)
Galway, East (1 MP)	Boundaries of parliamentary county altered to align with administrative county. The parliamentary borough of Galway was absorbed into Galway Connemara. Divided into four single-member divisions.	Galway, East (1 MP)
Galway, North (1 MP)	Boundaries of parliamentary county altered to align with administrative county. The parliamentary borough of Galway was absorbed into Galway Connemara. Divided into four single-member divisions.	Galway, North (1 MP)
Galway, South (1 MP)	Boundaries of parliamentary county altered to align with administrative county. The parliamentary borough of Galway was absorbed into Galway Connemara. Divided into four single-member divisions.	Galway, South (1 MP)
=== Kerry === Representation unchanged (4 MPs)
County Divisions
1885 Act	Change	1918 Act
Kerry, East (1 MP)	No change.	Kerry, East (1 MP)
Kerry, North (1 MP)	No change.	Kerry, North (1 MP)
Kerry, South (1 MP)	No change.	Kerry, South (1 MP)
Kerry, West (1 MP)	No change.	Kerry, West (1 MP)
=== Kildare === Representation unchanged (2 MPs)
County Divisions
1885 Act	Change	1918 Act
Kildare, North (1 MP)	No change.	Kildare, North (1 MP)
Kildare, South (1 MP)	No change.	Kildare, South (1 MP)
=== Kilkenny === Representation reduced from 3 to 2 MPs
Boroughs
1885 Act	Change	1918 Act
Kilkenny City (1 MP)	Abolished.	
County Divisions
1885 Act	Change	1918 Act
Kilkenny, North (1 MP)	Boundaries of parliamentary county altered to align with administrative county. The parliamentary borough of Kilkenny was absorbed into North Kilkenny. Divided into two single-member divisions.	Kilkenny, North (1 MP)
Kilkenny, South (1 MP)	Boundaries of parliamentary county altered to align with administrative county. The parliamentary borough of Kilkenny was absorbed into North Kilkenny. Divided into two single-member divisions.	Kilkenny, South (1 MP)
=== King's County === Representation reduced from 2 to 1 MP
County Divisions
1885 Act	Change	1918 Act
King's County Birr (1 MP)	Undivided parliamentary county returned one MP.	King's County (1 MP)
King's County Tullamore (1 MP)	Undivided parliamentary county returned one MP.	King's County (1 MP)
=== Leitrim === Representation reduced from 2 to 1 MP
County Divisions
1885 Act	Change	1918 Act
Leitrim, North (1 MP)	Undivided parliamentary county returned one MP.	Leitrim (1 MP)
Leitrim, South (1 MP)	Undivided parliamentary county returned one MP.	Leitrim (1 MP)
=== Limerick === Representation unchanged (3 MPs)
Boroughs
1885 Act	Change	1918 Act
Limerick City (1 MP)	No change.	Limerick City (1 MP)
County Divisions
1885 Act	Change	1918 Act
Limerick, East (1 MP)	No change.	Limerick, East (1 MP)
Limerick, West (1 MP)	No change.	Limerick, West (1 MP)
=== Londonderry === Representation unchanged (3 MPs)
Boroughs
1885 Act	Change	1918 Act
Londonderry City (1 MP)	No change.	Londonderry City (1 MP)
County Divisions
1885 Act	Change	1918 Act
Londonderry, North (1 MP)	No change.	Londonderry, North (1 MP)
Londonderry, South (1 MP)	No change.	Londonderry, South (1 MP)
=== Longford === Representation reduced from 2 to 1 MP
County Divisions
1885 Act	Change	1918 Act
Longford, North (1 MP)	Undivided parliamentary county returned one MP.	Longford (1 MP)
Longford, South (1 MP)	Undivided parliamentary county returned one MP.	Longford (1 MP)
=== Louth === Representation reduced from 2 to 1 MP
County Divisions
1885 Act	Change	1918 Act
Louth, North (1 MP)	Undivided parliamentary county returned one MP.	Louth (1 MP)
Louth, South (1 MP)	Undivided parliamentary county returned one MP.	Louth (1 MP)
=== Mayo === Representation unchanged (4 MPs)
County Divisions
1885 Act	Change	1918 Act
Mayo, East (1 MP)	Boundaries of parliamentary county altered to align with administrative county.	Mayo, East (1 MP)
Mayo, North (1 MP)	Boundaries of parliamentary county altered to align with administrative county.	Mayo, North (1 MP)
Mayo, South (1 MP)	Boundaries of parliamentary county altered to align with administrative county.	Mayo, South (1 MP)
Mayo, West (1 MP)	Boundaries of parliamentary county altered to align with administrative county.	Mayo, West (1 MP)
=== Meath === Representation unchanged (2 MPs)
County Divisions
1885 Act	Change	1918 Act
Meath, North (1 MP)	No change.	Meath, North (1 MP)
Meath, South (1 MP)	No change.	Meath, South (1 MP)
=== Monaghan === Representation unchanged (2 MPs)
County Divisions
1885 Act	Change	1918 Act
Monaghan, North (1 MP)	No change.	Monaghan, North (1 MP)
Monaghan, South (1 MP)	No change.	Monaghan, South (1 MP)
=== Queen's County === Representation reduced from 2 to 1 MP
County Divisions
1885 Act	Change	1918 Act
Queen's County, Leix (1 MP)	Undivided parliamentary county returned one MP.	Queen's County (1 MP)
Queen's County, Ossory (1 MP)	Undivided parliamentary county returned one MP.	Queen's County (1 MP)
=== Roscommon === Representation unchanged (2 MPs)
County Divisions
1885 Act	Change	1918 Act
Roscommon, North (1 MP)	Boundaries of parliamentary county altered to align with administrative county.	Roscommon, North (1 MP)
Roscommon, South (1 MP)	Boundaries of parliamentary county altered to align with administrative county.	Roscommon, South (1 MP)
=== Sligo === Representation unchanged (2 MPs)
County Divisions
1885 Act	Change	1918 Act
Sligo, North (1 MP)	No change.	Sligo, North (1 MP)
Sligo, South (1 MP)	No change.	Sligo, South (1 MP)
=== Tipperary === Representation unchanged (4 MPs)
County Divisions
1885 Act	Change	1918 Act
Tipperary, East (1 MP)	Boundaries of parliamentary county altered to align with administrative counties of North Tipperary and South Tipperary.	Tipperary, East (1 MP)
Tipperary, Mid (1 MP)	Boundaries of parliamentary county altered to align with administrative counties of North Tipperary and South Tipperary.	Tipperary, Mid (1 MP)
Tipperary, North (1 MP)	Boundaries of parliamentary county altered to align with administrative counties of North Tipperary and South Tipperary.	Tipperary, North (1 MP)
Tipperary, South (1 MP)	Boundaries of parliamentary county altered to align with administrative counties of North Tipperary and South Tipperary.	Tipperary, South (1 MP)
=== Tyrone === Representation reduced from 4 to 3 MPs
County Divisions
1885 Act	Change	1918 Act
Tyrone, East (1 MP)	Divided into three single-member divisions.	Tyrone, North East (1 MP)
Tyrone, Mid (1 MP)	Divided into three single-member divisions.	Tyrone, North East (1 MP)
Tyrone, North (1 MP)	Divided into three single-member divisions.	Tyrone, North West (1 MP)
Tyrone, South (1 MP)	Divided into three single-member divisions.	Tyrone, South (1 MP)
=== Waterford === Representation reduced from 3 to 2 MPs
Boroughs
1885 Act	Change	1918 Act
Waterford City (1 MP)	Extended to include entire county borough of Waterford and the part of the rural district of Waterford No. 1 which consisted of the district electoral divisions of Ballynakill, Kilbarry, Killoteran and Waterford Rural.	Waterford City (1 MP)
County Divisions
1885 Act	Change	1918 Act
Waterford, East (1 MP)	Boundaries of parliamentary county altered to align with administrative county, and to exclude the area of the extended parliamentary borough of Waterford. Undivided parliamentary county returned one MP.	County Waterford (1 MP)
Waterford, West (1 MP)	Boundaries of parliamentary county altered to align with administrative county, and to exclude the area of the extended parliamentary borough of Waterford. Undivided parliamentary county returned one MP.	County Waterford (1 MP)
=== Westmeath === Representation reduced from 2 to 1 MP
County Divisions
1885 Act	Change	1918 Act
Westmeath, North (1 MP)	Undivided parliamentary county returned one MP.	Westmeath (1 MP)
Westmeath, South (1 MP)	Undivided parliamentary county returned one MP.	Westmeath (1 MP)
=== Wexford === Representation unchanged (2 MPs)
County Divisions
1885 Act	Change	1918 Act
Wexford, North (1 MP)	Boundaries of parliamentary county altered to align with administrative county.	Wexford, North (1 MP)
Wexford, South (1 MP)	Boundaries of parliamentary county altered to align with administrative county.	Wexford, South (1 MP)
=== Wicklow === Representation unchanged (2 MPs)
County Divisions
1885 Act	Change	1918 Act
Wicklow, East (1 MP)	Boundaries of parliamentary county altered to align with administrative county.	Wicklow, East (1 MP)
Wicklow, West (1 MP)	Boundaries of parliamentary county altered to align with administrative county.	Wicklow, West (1 MP)
=== Universities === Representation increased from 2 to 4 MPs
1885 Act	Change	1918 Act
Dublin University (2 MPs)	No change	Dublin University (2 MPs)
New constituency		National University of Ireland (1 MP)
New constituency		Queen's University, Belfast (1 MP)

== Subsequent developments ==
The whole act was repealed by section 80(7) of, and the thirteenth schedule to, the Representation of the People Act 1948 (11 & 12 Geo. 6. c. 65), which came into force on 30 July 1948.

== See also ==
- Wikipedia:WikiProject UK Parliament constituencies/Historic constituency names
- List of former United Kingdom Parliament constituencies
- List of United Kingdom Parliament constituencies in Ireland and Northern Ireland
- Historic Dáil constituencies

== Bibliography ==
- Walker, Brian M., ed. (1978). Parliamentary Election Results in Ireland, 1801–1922. Royal Irish Academy.
