= Government of Ireland Act 1920 (constituencies) =

Constituencies first used in Ireland at 1921 elections

- Act of Parliament
- Parliament of the United Kingdom
- Long title: An Act to provide for the better Government of Ireland.
- Citation: 10 & 11 Geo. 5. c. 67

Dates
- Royal assent: 23 December 1920

Status: Repealed

Text of statute as originally enacted

The Government of Ireland Act 1920 (10 & 11 Geo. 5. c. 67) was an act passed by the Parliament of the United Kingdom to create two separate parliaments in Ireland: the Parliament of Northern Ireland and the Parliament of Southern Ireland. The Fifth Schedule to this act provided the constituencies for the House of Commons in these two separate parliaments. These same constituencies also replaced those provided in the Redistribution of Seats (Ireland) Act 1918 for representation of Ireland in the House of Commons of the United Kingdom at Westminster. Sinn Féin used these constituencies to elect the Second Dáil (1921–1922) and those constituencies in Southern Ireland were used to elect the 3rd Dáil (1922–1923).

== Constituencies ==
Southern Ireland

Constituency	SIHC	UKHC
Borough constituencies
Cork	4	1
Dublin Mid	4	1
Dublin North-West	4	1
Dublin South	4	1
County constituencies
Carlow–Kilkenny	4	1
Cavan	3	1
Cork East and North East	3	1
Cork Mid, North, South, South East and West	8	2
Clare	4	1
Donegal	6	1
Dublin County	6	2
Galway	7	2
Kerry–Limerick West	8	2
Kildare–Wicklow	5	1
King's County–Queen's County	4	1
Leitrim–Roscommon North	4	1
Limerick City–Limerick East	4	1
Longford–Westmeath	4	1
Louth–Meath	5	1
Mayo North and West	4	1
Mayo South–Roscommon South	4	1
Monaghan	3	1
Sligo–Mayo East	5	1
Tipperary Mid, North and South	4	1
Wexford	4	1
Waterford–Tipperary East	5	1
University constituencies
Dublin University	4	2
National University	4	1
Total	128	33

Northern Ireland

NIHC		UKHC	
Constituency	Seats	Constituency	Seats
Borough constituencies
Belfast East	4	Belfast East	1
Belfast North	4	Belfast North	1
Belfast South	4	Belfast South	1
Belfast West	4	Belfast West	1
County constituencies
Antrim	7	Antrim	2
Armagh	4	Armagh	1
Down	8	Down	2
Fermanagh and Tyrone	8	Fermanagh and Tyrone	2
Londonderry	5	Londonderry	1
University constituency
Queen's University of Belfast	4	Queen's University of Belfast	1
Total	52	Total	13

== Operation of constituencies ==
The First Dáil had used the constituencies which elected MPs to the House of Commons at the 1918 general election. In May 1921, Dáil Éireann resolved to use the constituencies in the Government of Ireland Act 1920 (in both parts of Ireland). The 1921 elections were used to elect the Second Dáil. This increased the total number of seats in the Dáil from 105 in 1918 to 180 in 1921 (52 in Northern Ireland and 128 in Southern Ireland, subsequently the Irish Free State). Only representatives from Sinn Féin sat in the Dáil. In practice this was confined to 125 TDs representing 130 seats.

Only the Dublin University MPs attended for the intended first meeting of the House of Commons of Southern Ireland, with those elected for Sinn Féin sitting as TDs in Dáil Éireann.

The members elected for Southern Ireland assembled in January to give legal effect to the Anglo-Irish Treaty under the terms of the British government, which had not recognised the Anglo-Irish Treaty Dáil vote. This included the Pro-Treaty Sinn Féin TDs and the four representatives of Dublin University. The 1922 Irish general election was held on the constituencies under this Act.

Under the terms of the Treaty, the Irish Free State left the United Kingdom on 6 December 1922. Therefore, only constituencies in Northern Ireland returned MPs at the 1922 United Kingdom general election held on 15 November, and the Westminster constituencies designated for Southern Ireland were never used.

The 1923 general election was the first election in the Irish Free State, and was contested under the new constituencies in the Electoral Act 1923.

In the House of Commons of Northern Ireland, the constituencies were replaced under the House of Commons (Method of Voting and Redistribution of Seats) Act (Northern Ireland) 1929 with single-seat constituencies elected by first-past-the-post voting. Queen's University of Belfast remained as a four-seat constituency until its abolition in 1969.

The United Kingdom House of Commons constituencies in Northern Ireland were altered by the Representation of the People Act 1948, including the abolition of the Queen's University of Belfast constituency. This took effect at the 1950 general election.

== Comparison with 1918 constituencies ==
Constituencies in the Government of Ireland Act 1920 were defined by reference to one or more constituencies as defined in the Redistribution of Seats (Ireland) Act 1918.

=== Northern Ireland ===
==== Belfast ==== 1918 Act: 9 MPs; 1920 Act: 16 MPs in NIHC & 4 MPs in UKHC
1918 Act	1920 Act
Belfast, Pottinger Division (one MP)	Belfast East (four MPs)
Belfast, Victoria Division (one MP)	Belfast East (four MPs)
Belfast, Duncairn Division (one MP)	Belfast North (four MPs)
Belfast, Shankill Division (one MP)	Belfast North (four MPs)
Belfast, Cromac Division (one MP)	Belfast South (four MPs)
Belfast, Ormeau Division (one MP)	Belfast South (four MPs)
Belfast, Falls Division (one MP)	Belfast West (four MPs)
Belfast, St Anne's Division (one MP)	Belfast West (four MPs)
Belfast, Woodvale Division (one MP)	Belfast West (four MPs)
==== Antrim ==== 1918 Act: 4 MPs; 1920 Act: 7 MPs in NIHC & 2 MPs in UKHC
1918 Act	1920 Act
Antrim, East Division (one MP)	Antrim (seven MPs)
Antrim, Mid Division (one MP)	Antrim (seven MPs)
Antrim, North Division (one MP)	Antrim (seven MPs)
Antrim, South Division (one MP)	Antrim (seven MPs)
==== Armagh ==== 1918 Act: 3 MPs; 1920 Act: 4 MPs in NIHC & 1 MP in UKHC
1918 Act	1920 Act
Armagh, Mid Division (one MP)	Armagh (four MPs)
Armagh, North Division (one MP)	Armagh (four MPs)
Armagh, South Division (one MP)	Armagh (four MPs)
==== Down ==== 1918 Act: 5 MPs; 1920 Act: 8 MPs in NIHC & 2 MPs in UKHC
1918 Act	1920 Act
Down, East Division (one MP)	Down (eight MPs)
Down, Mid Division (one MP)	Down (eight MPs)
Down, North Division (one MP)	Down (eight MPs)
Down, South Division (one MP)	Down (eight MPs)
Down, West Division (one MP)	Down (eight MPs)
==== Fermanagh and Tyrone ==== 1918 Act: 5 MPs; 1920 Act: 8 MPs in NIHC & 2 MPs in UKHC
1918 Act	1920 Act
Fermanagh, North Division (one MP)	Fermanagh and Tyrone (eight MPs)
Fermanagh, South Division (one MP)	Fermanagh and Tyrone (eight MPs)
Tyrone, North East Division (one MP)	Fermanagh and Tyrone (eight MPs)
Tyrone, North West Division (one MP)	Fermanagh and Tyrone (eight MPs)
Tyrone, South Division (one MP)	Fermanagh and Tyrone (eight MPs)
==== Londonderry ==== 1918 Act: 3 MPs; 1920 Act: 5 MPs in NIHC & 1 MP in UKHC
1918 Act	1920 Act
Londonderry City (one MP)	Londonderry (five MPs)
Londonderry, North Division (one MP)	Londonderry (five MPs)
Londonderry, South Division (one MP)	Londonderry (five MPs)
==== Universities ==== 1918 Act: 1 MPs; 1920 Act: 4 MPs in NIHC & 1 MP in UKHC
1918 Act	1920 Act
Queen's University of Belfast (one MP)	Queen's University of Belfast (four MPs)

=== Southern Ireland ===
==== Ulster (part) ==== Representation increased from 8 to 12 MPs
1918 Act	1920 Act
Cavan, East Division (one MP)	Cavan (three MPs)
Cavan, West Division (one MP)	Cavan (three MPs)
Donegal, East Division (one MP)	Donegal (six MPs)
Donegal, North Division (one MP)	Donegal (six MPs)
Donegal, South Division (one MP)	Donegal (six MPs)
Donegal, West Division (one MP)	Donegal (six MPs)
Monaghan, North Division (one MP)	Monaghan (three MPs)
Monaghan, North Division (one MP)	Monaghan (three MPs)
==== Leinster ==== Representation increased from 27 to 44 MPs
1918 Act	1920 Act
Dublin, College Green Division (one MP)	Mid Dublin (four MPs)
Dublin, Dublin Harbour Division (one MP)	Mid Dublin (four MPs)
Dublin, Clontarf Division (one MP)	North West Dublin (four MPs)
Dublin, St James's Division (one MP)	North West Dublin (four MPs)
Dublin, St Michan's Division (one MP)	North West Dublin (four MPs)
Dublin, St Patrick's Division (one MP)	Dublin South (four MPs)
Dublin St Stephen's Green Division (one MP)	Dublin South (four MPs)
County Dublin, North Division (one MP)	Dublin County (six MPs)
County Dublin, Pembroke Division (one MP)	Dublin County (six MPs)
County Dublin, Rathmines Division (one MP)	Dublin County (six MPs)
County Dublin, South Division (one MP)	Dublin County (six MPs)
King's County (one MP)	King's County-Queen's County (four MPs)
Queen's County (one MP)	King's County-Queen's County (four MPs)
Kildare, North Division (one MP)	Kildare–Wicklow (five MPs)
Kildare, South Division (one MP)	Kildare–Wicklow (five MPs)
Wicklow, East Division (one MP)	Kildare–Wicklow (five MPs)
Wicklow, West Division (one MP)	Kildare–Wicklow (five MPs)
Wexford, North Division (one MP)	Wexford (four MPs)
Wexford, South Division (one MP)	Wexford (four MPs)
County Carlow (one MP)	Carlow–Kilkenny (four MPs)
Kilkenny, North Division (one MP)	Carlow–Kilkenny (four MPs)
Kilkenny, South Division (one MP)	Carlow–Kilkenny (four MPs)
County Longford (one MP)	Longford–Westmeath (four MPs)
County Westmeath (one MP)	Longford–Westmeath (four MPs)
Louth County (one MP)	Louth–Meath (five MPs)
Meath, North Division (one MP)	Louth–Meath (five MPs)
Meath, South Division (one MP)	Louth–Meath (five MPs)
==== Munster ==== Representation increased from 24 to 40 MPs
1918 Act	1920 Act
Cork City (two MPs)	Cork City (four MPs)
Clare, East Division (one MP)	Clare (four MPs)
Clare, West Division (one MP)	Clare (four MPs)
Limerick City (one MP)	Limerick City–Limerick East (four MPs)
Limerick, East Division (one MP)	Limerick City–Limerick East (four MPs)
Kerry, East Division (one MP)	Kerry–Limerick West (eight MPs)
Kerry, North Division (one MP)	Kerry–Limerick West (eight MPs)
Kerry, South Division (one MP)	Kerry–Limerick West (eight MPs)
Kerry, West Division (one MP)	Kerry–Limerick West (eight MPs)
Limerick, West Division (one MP)	Kerry–Limerick West (eight MPs)
Cork, East Division (one MP)	Cork East and North East (three MPs)
Cork, North East Division (one MP)	Cork East and North East (three MPs)
Cork, Mid Division (one MP)	Cork Mid, North, South, South East and West (eight MPs)
Cork, North Division (one MP)	Cork Mid, North, South, South East and West (eight MPs)
Cork, South Division (one MP)	Cork Mid, North, South, South East and West (eight MPs)
Cork, South East Division (one MP)	Cork Mid, North, South, South East and West (eight MPs)
Cork, West Division (one MP)	Cork Mid, North, South, South East and West (eight MPs)
Tipperary, East Division (one MP)	Waterford–Tipperary East (five MPs)
Waterford City (one MP)	Waterford–Tipperary East (five MPs)
County Waterford (one MP)	Waterford–Tipperary East (five MPs)
Tipperary, Mid Division (one MP)	Tipperary Mid, North and South (four MPs)
Tipperary, North Division (one MP)	Tipperary Mid, North and South (four MPs)
Tipperary, South Division (one MP)	Tipperary Mid, North and South (four MPs)
==== Connacht ==== Representation increased from 13 to 24 MPs
1918 Act	1920 Act
Galway, Connemara Division (one MP)	Galway (seven MPs)
Galway, East Division (one MP)	Galway (seven MPs)
Galway, North Division (one MP)	Galway (seven MPs)
Galway, South Division (one MP)	Galway (seven MPs)
Mayo, North Division (one MP)	Mayo North and West (four MPs)
Mayo, West Division (one MP)	Mayo North and West (four MPs)
Mayo, South Division (one MP)	Mayo South–Roscommon South (four MPs)
Roscommon, South Division (one MP)	Mayo South–Roscommon South (four MPs)
Mayo, East Division (one MP)	Sligo–Mayo East (five MPs)
Sligo, North Division (one MP)	Sligo–Mayo East (five MPs)
Sligo, South Division (one MP)	Sligo–Mayo East (five MPs)
County Leitrim (one MP)	Leitrim–Roscommon North (four MPs)
Roscommon, North Division (one MP)	Leitrim–Roscommon North (four MPs)
==== Universities ==== Representation increased from 3 to 8 MPs
1918 Act	1920 Act
Dublin University (two MPs)	Dublin University (four MPs)
National University (one MP)	National University (four MPs)

== See also ==
- List of United Kingdom Parliament constituencies in Ireland and Northern Ireland
- List of parliamentary constituencies in Northern Ireland
- Historic Dáil constituencies
- Northern Ireland Parliament constituencies
