= 1922 United Kingdom general election in Northern Ireland =

- 15 November 1922

All 13 seats in Northern Ireland to the House of Commons
- Turnout: 77.2%

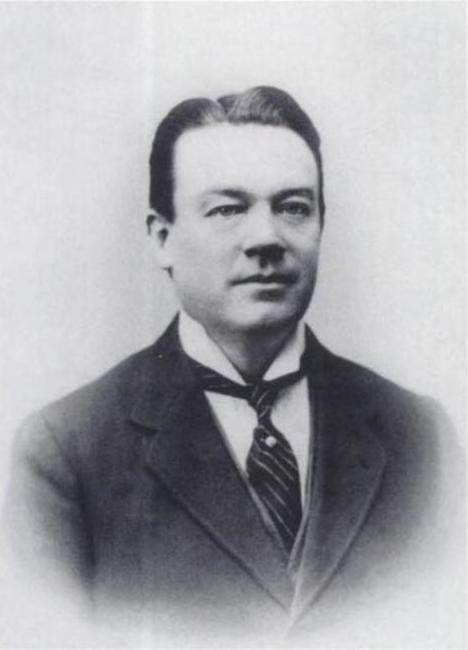
	First party	Second party
Leader	James Craig	Joe Devlin
Party	UUP	Nationalist
Alliance	Conservative
Leader since	7 June 1921	14 December 1918
Leader's seat	Did not stand	Did not stand
Seats won	11 (Note: Includes 10 members elected unopposed.)	2
Popular vote	107,972 (Note: Voting only took place in 3 of 13 seats. The other 10 MPs were unopposed.)	90,053
Percentage	55.8%	36.3%
Swing	New party	New party

The 1922 United Kingdom general election in Northern Ireland was held on 15 November 1922. There were ten constituencies, seven single-seat constituencies with MPs elected by FPTP and three two-seat constituencies with MPs elected by bloc voting. Only two of the constituencies had contested elections.

It was the first election held after the Government of Ireland Act 1920, which had reduced the number of seats in the House of Commons of the United Kingdom in the region designated as Northern Ireland from 30 to 13. It was also the first election held after the approval of the Anglo-Irish Treaty, whereby the Irish Free State separated from the United Kingdom with effect from 6 December 1922, a few weeks after the election was held.

The focus of politics in Northern Ireland had shifted to the Parliament of Northern Ireland, after the first general election to the House of Commons of Northern Ireland in May 1921. The party leaders of the three parties had been elected to seats in this parliament rather than at Westminster.

== Candidates ==
Below is a table summarising the candidates of the 1922 general election in Northern Ireland in the county and borough constituencies, and those in Queen's University of Belfast.

Affiliation	Candidates
Ulster Unionist Party	13
Nationalist Party	2
Independent	1
Sinn Féin	0
Labour Unionist	0
Total	16

== Results ==
Voting only took place for 3 of 13 seats. The other 10 MPs (all Ulster Unionists) were unopposed.

Party	Leader	Candidates	Seats					Aggregate votes		
Party	Leader	Candidates	Total	Gains	Losses	Net	Of total (%)	Total	Of total (%) (Note: Adjusted for multi-member constituencies.)	Change (%)
UUP	James Craig	13	11	11	0	▲11	84.6	107,972	55.8	▼0.4
Nationalist	Joseph Devlin	2	2	2	0	▲2	15.4	90,053	36.3	▲25.2
Independent	—N/a	1	0	0	0	Steady	—	9,861	7.9	▲7.8
Other non-contested		0	0	—N/a		▼30	—	0	0.0	—N/a
Total		16	13			▼17	100.0	207,886	100.0	0.0
Registered voters, and turnout								1,451,496 (Note: Electorate in contested constituencies. The total electorate was 1,926,274.)	77.2	

Popular vote
UUP	55.8%
National	36.3%
Independent	7.9%

Parliamentary seats
UUP	84.6%
National	15.4%

== Analysis ==
The Ulster Unionist Party was dominant in this election, and won the most seats at every election in Northern Ireland until the 2005 general election. They took the Conservative Party whip in the House of Commons.

The Nationalist Party was a successor to the Irish Parliamentary Party which had suffered a large defeat in the previous election, now continuing in the area of Northern Ireland.

In the previous election, Sinn Féin had won three of the seats in this region. The Irish Free State had been in the midst of the Irish Civil War from June 1922, which divided Sinn Féin into Pro-Treaty and Anti-Treaty factions (soon to become separate parties), and it did not contest this election to Westminster.

In the election as a whole, the Conservatives led by Bonar Law won an absolute majority of 344 of the 615 seats.

== MPs elected ==
Constituency	Party	MP
Antrim	Ulster Unionist	Charles Craig
Antrim	Ulster Unionist	Hugh O'Neill
Armagh	Ulster Unionist	William Allen
Belfast East	Ulster Unionist	Herbert Dixon
Belfast North	Ulster Unionist	Thomas McConnell
Belfast South	Ulster Unionist	Thomas Moles
Belfast West	Ulster Unionist	Robert Lynn
Down	Ulster Unionist	David Reid
Down	Ulster Unionist	John Simms
Fermanagh and Tyrone	Nationalist Party	Thomas Harbison
Fermanagh and Tyrone	Nationalist Party	Cahir Healy
Londonderry	Ulster Unionist	Malcolm Macnaghten
Queen's University of Belfast	Ulster Unionist	Sir William Whitla

== Changes since 1918 ==
At the previous general election, the seats won in the area which would become Northern Ireland were:

Results in (prospective) Northern Ireland, 1918
Party	Votes	% Votes	Seats	% Seats
Irish Unionist	225,082	56.2	20	69.0
Sinn Féin	76,100	19.0	3	6.9
Irish Parliamentary	44,238	11.1	4	13.8
Labour Unionist	30,304	7.6	3	10.3
Belfast Labour	12,164	3.0	0	—
Ind. Unionist	8,738	2.2	0	—
Ind. Nationalist	2,602	0.6	0	—
Independent Labour	659	0.2	0	—
Independent	436	0.1	0	—
Total	400,323		30	

The Sinn Féin members elected sat as TDs for the First Dáil, a revolutionary parliament for an Irish Republic.

The table below indicates the political career of each of those elected in 1918 after the 1922 general election:

1918 Constituency	Party	MP	1922 career
Antrim East	UUP	Robert McCalmont	Resigned in 1919; succeeded by George Hanna, NI MP 1921–37
Antrim Mid	UUP	Hugh O'Neill	UK MP for Antrim
Antrim North	UUP	Peter Kerr-Smiley	Retired
Antrim South	UUP	Charles Curtis Craig	UK MP for Antrim
Armagh Mid	UUP	James Lonsdale	Died in May 1921; succeeded by Henry Armstrong, NI Senator 1921–37
Armagh North	UUP	William Allen	UK MP for Armagh
Armagh South	Nationalist	Patrick Donnelly	Did not contest, later unsuccessful in 1929 NI election
Belfast Cromac	UUP	William Arthur Lindsay	Retired
Belfast Duncairn	UUP	Edward Carson	Appointed as Law Lord in 1921; succeeded by Thomas McConnell, UK MP for Belfast North in 1922
Belfast Falls	Nationalist	Joseph Devlin	NI MP for Belfast West
Belfast Ormeau	UUP	Thomas Moles	UK MP for Belfast South
Belfast Pottinger	UUP	Herbert Dixon	UK MP for Belfast East
Belfast St Anne's	Labour Unionist	Thomas Henry Burn	NI MP for Belfast West (UUP)
Belfast Shankill	Labour Unionist	Samuel McGuffin	NI MP for Belfast North (UUP)
Belfast Victoria	Labour Unionist	Thompson Donald	NI MP for Belfast East (UUP)
Belfast Woodvale	UUP	Robert Lynn	NI MP for Belfast West and UK MP for Belfast West
Down East	UUP	David Reid	UK MP for Down
Down Mid	UUP	James Craig	NI MP for Down and Prime Minister of Northern Ireland
Down North	UUP	Thomas Watters Brown	Appointed judge of the High Court of Justice in Northern Ireland in 1922
Down South	Nationalist	Jeremiah McVeagh	Did not contest. Later unsuccessfully sought election.
Down West	UUP	Daniel M. Wilson	Appointed Recorder of Belfast in 1921; succeeded by Thomas Browne Wallace
Fermanagh North	UUP	Edward Archdale	NI MP for Fermanagh and Tyrone
Fermanagh South	Sinn Féin	Seán O'Mahony	NI MP for Fermanagh and Tyrone
Londonderry City	Sinn Féin	Eoin MacNeill	TD for National University of Ireland for Cumann na nGaedheal
Londonderry North	UUP	Hugh Anderson	Resigned 1919; succeeded by Hugh T. Barrie, NI Senator in 1922
Londonderry South	UUP	Denis Henry	Appointed Lord Chief Justice of Northern Ireland in 1921
Tyrone North East	Nationalist	Thomas Harbison	UK MP for Fermanagh and Tyrone
Tyrone North West	Sinn Féin	Arthur Griffith	Died 12 August 1922
Tyrone South	UUP	William Coote	NI MP for Fermanagh and Tyrone

== See also ==
- 1922 United Kingdom general election in England
- 1922 United Kingdom general election in Scotland
- 1922 United Kingdom general election in Wales
