= Belfast Falls (UK Parliament constituency) =

Parliamentary constituency in the United Kingdom, 1918–1922

- Former borough constituency for the House of Commons

1918–1922
- Seats: 1
- Created from: Belfast West
- Replaced by: Belfast West

Falls, a division of Belfast, was a UK parliamentary constituency in Ireland. It returned one Member of Parliament (MP) to the House of Commons of the United Kingdom from 1918 to 1922, using the first past the post electoral system.

== Boundaries and Boundary Changes ==
The constituency was created by the Redistribution of Seats (Ireland) Act 1918 from an area which had been in the Belfast West constituency. It comprised the central third of West Belfast, and contained the Falls and Smithfield wards of Belfast City Council. The streets in Falls Ward in 1911 are listed here and here, and the streets in Smithfield Ward in 1911 are listed here and here.

It was in use at the 1918 general election only, and under the Government of Ireland Act 1920 its area was again part of the Belfast West constituency, with effect at the 1922 general election.

== Politics ==
The constituency was a nationalist area. Joe Devlin defeated Sinn Féin by better than 2 to 1. The Unionists did not contest the seat.

== First Dáil ==
After the 1918 election, Sinn Féin invited all those elected for constituencies in Ireland to sit as TDs in Dáil Éireann rather than in the House of Commons of the United Kingdom. All those elected for Irish constituencies were included in the roll of the Dáil but only those elected for Sinn Féin sat in the First Dáil. In May 1921, the Dáil passed a resolution declaring that elections to the House of Commons of Northern Ireland and the House of Commons of Southern Ireland would be used as the election for the Second Dáil and that the First Dáil would be dissolved on the assembly of the new body. The area of Belfast Falls would then have been represented in the Dáil by the four-seat constituency of Belfast West, which also returned no representatives for Sinn Féin.

== Members of Parliament ==
Election	Member	Party
1918	Joseph Devlin	Nationalist
1922	constituency abolished	

== Election ==
General Election 14 December 1918: Belfast Falls
Party	Candidate	Votes	%	±%
Irish Nationalist	Joseph Devlin	8,488	72.3	
Sinn Féin	Éamon de Valera	3,245	27.7	
Majority		5,243	44.6	
Turnout		11,733	74.5	
Irish Nationalist win (new seat)				

== See also ==
- List of UK Parliament Constituencies in Ireland and Northern Ireland
- List of MPs elected in the 1918 United Kingdom general election
- Historic Dáil constituencies
