= Belfast Pottinger (UK Parliament constituency) =

Parliamentary constituency in the United Kingdom, 1918–1922

- Former borough constituency for the House of Commons
- Borough: Belfast

1918–1922
- Seats: 1
- Created from: Belfast East
- Replaced by: Belfast East

Pottinger, a division of Belfast, was a UK parliamentary constituency in Ireland. It returned one Member of Parliament (MP) to the House of Commons of the United Kingdom from 1918 to 1922, using the first past the post electoral system.

== Boundaries and boundary changes ==
The constituency was created by the Redistribution of Seats (Ireland) Act 1918 from an area which had been in the Belfast East constituency. It comprised the south-western half of East Belfast, and contained the Pottinger ward of Belfast Corporation.

It was in use at the 1918 general election only, and under the Government of Ireland Act 1920 its area was again part of the Belfast East constituency, with effect at the 1922 general election.

== Politics ==
The constituency was a strongly unionist area, with some Labour support. Sinn Féin demonstrated republican weakness in the seat by receiving only 393 votes.

== First Dáil ==
After the 1918 election, Sinn Féin invited all those elected for constituencies in Ireland to sit as TDs in Dáil Éireann rather than in the House of Commons of the United Kingdom. All those elected for Irish constituencies were included in the roll of the Dáil but only those elected for Sinn Féin sat in the First Dáil. In May 1921, the Dáil passed a resolution declaring that elections to the House of Commons of Northern Ireland and the House of Commons of Southern Ireland would be used as the election for the Second Dáil and that the First Dáil would be dissolved on the assembly of the new body. The area of Belfast Pottinger would then have been represented in the Dáil by the four-seat constituency of Belfast East, which also returned no representatives for Sinn Féin.

== Members of Parliament ==
Election	Member	Party
1918	Herbert Dixon	Irish Unionist
May 1921	Herbert Dixon	Ulster Unionist
1922	Herbert Dixon	constituency abolished

== Elections ==
1918 general election: Belfast Pottinger
Party	Candidate	Votes	%	±%
Irish Unionist	Herbert Dixon	8,574	70.63	
Belfast Labour	Samuel Clarke Porter	2,513	20.70	
Independent Labour	James Henry Bennett	659	5.43	
Sinn Féin	Bernard Campbell	393	3.24	
Majority		6,061	49.93	
Turnout		17,084	71.05	
Irish Unionist win (new seat)				

== See also ==
- List of United Kingdom Parliament constituencies in Ireland and Northern Ireland
- List of MPs elected in the 1918 United Kingdom general election
- Historic Dáil constituencies
