= Samuel Clarke Porter =

Northern Irish judge and politician

Samuel Clarke Porter (14 June 1875 – 10 July 1956) was a judge and politician in Northern Ireland.

== Biography ==
Born in Portrush, Porter studied at the Coleraine Academical Institution, Methodist College Belfast and Queen's University Belfast, before qualifying in law with the Royal University of Ireland.

Porter qualified as a barrister in 1903. He also became politically active, joining the Irish Liberal Party. A supporter of Irish Home Rule, he left the Liberals and stood for the Belfast Labour Representation Committee in Belfast Pottinger at the 1918 general election, taking second place with 20.7% of the vote.

Porter subsequently focused on his legal career. He was made a King's Counsel in 1933, a Bencher in 1939, the Senior Crown Prosecutor for County Down in 1943 and then Belfast in 1945, and acted as the Lord Justice for the Government of Northern Ireland when the Governor of Northern Ireland was absent. In 1946, he was made a Lord Justice of Appeal in the Supreme Court of Northern Ireland, and the following year he was appointed to the Privy Council of Northern Ireland.
