= Belfast Woodvale (UK Parliament constituency) =

Division of Belfast, was a UK parliamentary constituency in Ireland

Coordinates: 54.610°N 5.963°W

- Former borough constituency for the House of Commons

1918–1922
- Seats: 1
- Created from: Belfast West
- Replaced by: Belfast West

Woodvale, a division of Belfast, was a UK parliamentary constituency in Ireland. It returned one Member of Parliament (MP) to the House of Commons of the United Kingdom from 1918 to 1922, using the first past the post electoral system.

== Boundaries and Boundary Changes ==
The constituency was created by the Redistribution of Seats (Ireland) Act 1918 from an area which had been in the Belfast West constituency. It comprised the northern third of west Belfast, and contained the Court and Woodvale wards of Belfast Corporation.

It was in use at the 1918 general election only, and under the Government of Ireland Act 1920 its area was again part of the Belfast West constituency, with effect from the 1922 general election.

== Politics ==
The constituency was a strongly unionist area.

== First Dáil ==
After the 1918 election, Sinn Féin invited all those elected for constituencies in Ireland to sit as TDs in Dáil Éireann rather than in the House of Commons of the United Kingdom. All those elected for Irish constituencies were included in the roll of the Dáil but only those elected for Sinn Féin sat in the First Dáil. In May 1921, the Dáil passed a resolution declaring that elections to the House of Commons of Northern Ireland and the House of Commons of Southern Ireland would be used as the election for the Second Dáil and that the First Dáil would be dissolved on the assembly of the new body. The area of Belfast Woodvale would then have been represented in the Dáil by the four-seat constituency of Belfast West, which also returned no representatives for Sinn Féin.

== Members of Parliament ==
Election	Member	Party
1918	Robert Lynn	Irish Unionist
May 1921	Robert Lynn	Ulster Unionist
1922	Robert Lynn	constituency abolished

== Election ==
General Election 14 December 1918: Belfast Woodvale
Party	Candidate	Votes	%	±%
Irish Unionist	Robert Lynn	12,232	90.75	
Sinn Féin	Robert Haskin	1,247	9.25	
Majority		10,985	81.50	
Turnout		19,802	68.07	
Irish Unionist win (new seat)				

== See also ==
- List of United Kingdom Parliament constituencies in Ireland and Northern Ireland
- List of MPs elected in the 1918 United Kingdom general election
- Historic Dáil constituencies
