= Belfast Ormeau =

Parliamentary constituency in the United Kingdom, 1918–1922

- Former borough constituency for the House of Commons
- Borough: Belfast

1918–1922
- Seats: 1
- Created from: Belfast South
- Replaced by: Belfast South

Ormeau, a division of Belfast, was a UK parliamentary constituency in Ireland. It returned one Member of Parliament (MP) to the House of Commons of the United Kingdom from 1918 to 1922, using the first past the post electoral system.

== Boundaries and boundary changes ==
In 1917, a boundary commission proposed an increase in the number of divisions in the parliamentary borough of Belfast from four to nine. This was implemented under the Redistribution of Seats (Ireland) Act 1918. The Ormeau division was created from the Ormeau ward of Belfast Corporation.

It was in use at the 1918 general election only. Under the Government of Ireland Act 1920 its area was combined with Cromac division to form Belfast South, with effect at the 1922 general election.

== Politics ==
The constituency was a strongly unionist area. This was evident in the very low performance by Sinn Féin in the 1918 election.

After the 1918 election, Sinn Féin invited all those elected for constituencies in Ireland to sit as TDs in Dáil Éireann rather than in the House of Commons of the United Kingdom. All those elected for Irish constituencies were included in the roll of the Dáil but only those elected for Sinn Féin sat in the First Dáil. In May 1921, the Dáil passed a resolution declaring that elections to the House of Commons of Northern Ireland and the House of Commons of Southern Ireland would be used as the election for the Second Dáil and that the First Dáil would be dissolved on the assembly of the new body. The area of Belfast Ormeau would then have been represented in the Dáil by the four-seat constituency of Belfast South, which also returned no representatives for Sinn Féin.

== Members of Parliament ==
Election	Member	Party
1918	Thomas Moles	Irish Unionist
1921	Thomas Moles	Ulster Unionist
1922	constituency abolished	

== Election ==
General Election 14 December 1918: Belfast Ormea
Party	Candidate	Votes	%	±%
Irish Unionist	Thomas Moles	7,460	59.06	
Ind. Unionist	William Stewart	4,833	38.26	
Sinn Féin	James Joseph Dobbyn	338	2.68	
Majority		2,627	20.80	
Turnout		16,343	77.29	
Irish Unionist win (new seat)				
