= Gerald Brunskill (politician) =

Irish politician

Gerald Fitzgibbon Brunskill (1866–1918) was an Irish Unionist Party politician who served briefly as Member of Parliament (MP) for Mid Tyrone. He was elected in the general election of January 1910, but lost the seat 11 months later in the December 1910 general election to Richard McGhee.

Parliament of the United Kingdom
Preceded by George Murnaghan	Member of Parliament for Mid Tyrone; January 1910 – December 1910	Succeeded by Richard McGhee
