= George Murnaghan =

Irish politician

George Murnaghan (4 July 1847 – 13 January 1929) was an Irish Nationalist member of parliament in the parliament of the United Kingdom. He represented the Mid Tyrone constituency from the 1895 United Kingdom general election, until the January 1910 United Kingdom general election.

== Biography ==
Murnaghan emigrated to the US in the late 1860s, where he was a housebuilder and keeper of a livery stable in St Louis, Missouri. He married Angela Mooney, originally from Dublin with whom he had 9 children. He and his wife returned to Ireland in the late 1880s for health reasons.

Francis Dominic Murnaghan, the Irish mathematician, was his son, and Francis Dominic Murnaghan, Jr., a United States federal judge, was his grandson. James Murnaghan, judge of the Supreme Court of Ireland, was his son. Sheelagh Murnaghan, Ulster Liberal Party MP in Northern Ireland was his granddaughter.

Parliament of the United Kingdom
Preceded by Matthew Joseph Kenny	Member of Parliament for Mid Tyrone; 1895 – January 1910	Succeeded by Gerald Brunskill
