= Dublin College Green =

UK parliamentary constituency in Ireland, 1885–1922

- Former borough constituency for the House of Commons
- College Green constituency within Dublin, 1885 to 1918
- Borough: Dublin

1885–1922
- Seats: 1
- Created from: Dublin
- Replaced by: Dublin Mid

College Green, a division of the parliamentary borough of Dublin, was a parliamentary constituency which returned one Member of Parliament (MP) to the House of Commons of the United Kingdom from 1885 until 1922. From 1918 to 1921, it was also used as a constituency for Dáil Éireann.

From the dissolution of 1922, the area was no longer represented in the UK Parliament.

== History ==
Prior to the 1885 general election, the parliamentary borough was represented by the undivided two-member Dublin City constituency. Under the Redistribution of Seats Act 1885, the parliamentary borough of Dublin was divided into four divisions: College Green, Dublin Harbour, St Stephen's Green and St Patrick's. This was a strongly Nationalist area, which moved after the 1916 Easter Rising to supporting Sinn Féin. In the 1918 election, Sinn Féin got more than three-quarters of the vote.

The Report of the Boundary Commission in 1917 recommended an increase in representation of the city from four seats to seven. This was implemented under the Redistribution of Seats (Ireland) Act 1918; in to the addition to the four existing divisions, the new divisions were Clontarf, St James's and St Michan's.

At the 1918 general election, Sinn Féin issued an election manifesto in which it called for a "establishment of a constituent assembly comprising persons chosen by Irish constituencies". After the election, Sinn Féin invited all those elected for Irish constituencies to sit as members of Dáil Éireann, termed Teachta Dála (or TD, known in English as a Deputy). In practice, only those elected for Sinn Féin attended. This included Seán T. O'Kelly, elected for College Green. He was the presiding officer of the First Dáil (with the title Ceann Comhairle) from 22 January 1919. His appointment as Ceann Comhairle was confirmed 1 April 1919.

Under the Government of Ireland Act 1920, the area was combined with the Dublin Harbour division to form Dublin Mid, a 4-seat constituency for the Southern Ireland House of Commons and a single constituency at Westminster. At the 1921 election for the Southern Ireland House of Commons, the four seats were won uncontested by Sinn Féin, who treated it as part of the election to the Second Dáil. Seán T. O'Kelly was one of the four TDs for Dublin Mid.

Under s. 1(4) of the Irish Free State (Agreement) Act 1922, no writ was to be issued "for a constituency in Ireland other than a constituency in Northern Ireland". Therefore, no vote was held in Dublin Mid at the 1922 United Kingdom general election on 15 November 1922, shortly before the Irish Free State left the United Kingdom on 6 December 1922.

== Boundaries ==
This constituency comprised part of the city of Dublin. It was predominantly on the northside of the city, but crossed the River Liffey to include College Green.

From 1885 to 1918, it was defined as:

Arran Quay Ward, Inns Quay Ward, North City Ward and South City Ward, and that part of Rotunda Ward lying south-west of a line drawn along the centre of North Frederick Street and a line drawn along the centre of East Cavendish Row.

From 1918 to 1922, it was defined as:

The Inns Quay, North City, South City and Rotunda wards of the Borough.

== Members of Parliament ==
Year	MP	Party	Notes
1885	Timothy Daniel Sullivan	Irish Parliamentary (Note: Took the anti-Parnellite side in the 1890 split, contesting the 1892 election for the Irish National Federation.)	
1886	Timothy Daniel Sullivan	Irish Parliamentary	
1892	J. E. Kenny	Irish National League (Parnellite)	
1896 b	James Laurence Carew	Irish National League (Parnellite)	
1900	Joseph Nannetti	Irish Parliamentary	
1906	Joseph Nannetti	Irish Parliamentary	
Jan. 1910	Joseph Nannetti	Irish Parliamentary	
Dec. 1910	Joseph Nannetti	Irish Parliamentary	
1915 b	John Dillon Nugent	Irish Parliamentary	Death of Nannetti
1918	Seán T. O'Kelly	Sinn Féin	
1922	Constituency abolished		

== Elections ==
=== Elections in the 1880s ===
1885 general election: Dublin College Green
Party	Candidate	Votes	%	±%
Irish Parliamentary	Timothy Daniel Sullivan	6,548	81.2	
Liberal	David Sherlock	1,518	18.8	
Majority		5,030	62.4	
Turnout		8,066	74.7	
Registered electors		10,797		
Irish Parliamentary win (new seat)				

1886 general election: Dublin College Green
Party	Candidate	Votes	%	±%
Irish Parliamentary	Timothy Daniel Sullivan	Unopposed		
Irish Parliamentary hold				

=== Elections in the 1890s ===
1892 general election: Dublin College Green
Party	Candidate	Votes	%	±%
Irish National League	J. E. Kenny	2,568	50.1	N/A
Irish Unionist	Henry Cochrane	1,441	28.1	New
Irish National Federation	Timothy Daniel Sullivan	1,116	21.8	N/A
Majority		1,127	22.0	N/A
Turnout		5,125	75.6	N/A
Registered electors		6,781		
Irish National League gain from Irish Parliamentary		Swing	N/A	

1895 general election: Dublin College Green
Party	Candidate	Votes	%	±%
Irish National League	J. E. Kenny	Unopposed		
Irish National League hold				

1896 Dublin College Green by-election
Party	Candidate	Votes	%	±%
Irish National League	James Laurence Carew	Unopposed		
Irish National League hold				

=== Elections in the 1900s ===
1900 general election: Dublin College Green
Party	Candidate	Votes	%	±%
Irish Parliamentary	Joseph Nannetti	2,467	53.2	N/A
Healyite Nationalist	James Laurence Carew	2,173	46.8	N/A
Majority		294	6.4	N/A
Turnout		4,640	45.4	N/A
Registered electors		10,223		
Irish Parliamentary hold		Swing	N/A	

1906 general election: Dublin College Green
Party	Candidate	Votes	%	±%
Irish Parliamentary	Joseph Nannetti	Unopposed		
Irish Parliamentary hold				

=== Elections in the 1910s ===
January 1910 general election: Dublin College Green
Party	Candidate	Votes	%	±%
Irish Parliamentary	Joseph Nannetti	4,559	78.6	N/A
Irish Unionist	George Bernard O'Connor	1,239	21.4	New
Majority		3,320	57.2	N/A
Turnout		5,798	66.3	N/A
Registered electors		8,739		
Irish Parliamentary hold		Swing	N/A	

December 1910 general election: Dublin College Green
Party	Candidate	Votes	%	±%
Irish Parliamentary	Joseph Nannetti	Unopposed		
Irish Parliamentary hold				

By-election 1915: Dublin College Green
Party	Candidate	Votes	%	±%
Irish Parliamentary	John Dillon Nugent	2,445	57.38	N/A
Labour	Thomas Farren	1,816	42.62	New
Majority		629	14.76	N/A
Turnout		4,261	52.2	N/A
Registered electors		8,167		
Irish Parliamentary hold		Swing	N/A	

General election, 1918: Dublin College Green
Party	Candidate	Votes	%	±%
Sinn Féin	Seán T. O'Kelly	9,662	77.2	New
Ind. Nationalist	Joseph Coghland Briscoe	2,853	22.8	New
Majority		6,809	54.4	N/A
Turnout		12,515	58.4	N/A
Registered electors		21,414		
Sinn Féin gain from Irish Parliamentary		Swing	N/A	

== See also ==
- Historic Dáil constituencies

== Notes, citations and sources ==
=== Sources ===
- Walker, Brian M., ed. (1978). Parliamentary Election Results in Ireland, 1801–1922. Dublin: Royal Irish Academy. ISBN 0901714127.

=== External links ===
- Dáil Éireann Members Database Office of the Houses of the Oireachtas
- Dublin Historic Maps: Parliamentary & Dail Constituencies 1780–1969 (a work in progress)
