= Dublin St Michan's =

Westminster constituency (1918–1922)

- Former borough constituency for the House of Commons
- Borough: Dublin

1918–1922
- Seats: 1
- Replaced by: Dublin North-West

St Michan's, a division of the parliamentary borough of Dublin, was a parliamentary constituency which returned one Member of Parliament (MP) to the House of Commons of the United Kingdom from 1918 until 1922, using the first past the post electoral system. From 1918 to 1921, it was used as a constituency for the revolutionary Dáil Éireann.

From the dissolution of 1922, the area was no longer represented in the UK Parliament.

== Boundaries ==
It was defined as:

The Arran Quay and Glasnevin wards of the borough.

Arran Quay was transferred from the College Green division of the borough; Glasnevin was transferred from the North Dublin division of the county.

St Michan's is a civil parish, then within the Arran Quay Ward, which includes both St. Michan's Church of the Church of Ireland and St. Michan's Catholic Church.

== History ==
Under the Redistribution of Seats Act 1885, the parliamentary borough of Dublin had been divided into four divisions: College Green, Dublin Harbour, St Stephen's Green and St Patrick's. The city boundaries were expanded in 1900, incorporating the township of Drumcondra, Clonliffe and Glasnevin within County Dublin. A 1917 Boundary Commission recommended an overall increase of representation of Dublin City and County from 6 seats to 11 seats to reflect changes in population. Under the Redistribution of Seats (Ireland) Act 1918, the city was allocated three additional seats: Clontarf, St James's and St Michan's.

At the 1918 general election, Sinn Féin issued an election manifesto in which it called for the "establishment of a constituent assembly comprising persons chosen by Irish constituencies". After the election, Sinn Féin invited all those elected for Irish constituencies to sit as members of Dáil Éireann, termed Teachta Dála (or TD, known in English as a Deputy). Only those elected for Sinn Féin attended. This included Michael Staines, elected for St Michan's.

Under the Government of Ireland Act 1920, the area was combined with the Clontarf and St James's Divisions to form Dublin North-West, a 4-seat constituency for the Southern Ireland House of Commons and a single-seat constituency at Westminster. At the 1921 election for the Southern Ireland House of Commons, the four seats were won uncontested by Sinn Féin, who treated it as part of the election to the Second Dáil. Michael Staines was one of the four TDs for Dublin North-West.

The Anglo-Irish Treaty, signed 6 December 1921, provided for the establishment of the Irish Free State. Under s. 1(4) of the Irish Free State (Agreement) Act 1922, no writ was to be issued "for a constituency in Ireland other than a constituency in Northern Ireland". Therefore, after the dissolution of the House of Commons on 26 October 1922, no vote was held in Dublin North-West at the 1922 United Kingdom general election on 15 November, shortly before the Irish Free State left the United Kingdom on 6 December 1922.

== Members of Parliament ==
Year	MP	Party
1918	Michael Staines	Sinn Féin
1922	constituency abolished	

== Elections ==
1918 general election: Dublin St Michan's 14 December 1918
Party	Candidate	Votes	%	±%
Sinn Féin	Michael Staines	7,553	65.40	
Irish Nationalist	John Dillon Nugent	3,996	34.60	
Majority		3,557	30.80	
Turnout		11,549	65.46	
Sinn Féin win (new seat)				
