= Dublin St Patrick's =

UK parliamentary constituency in Ireland, 1885–1922

- Former borough constituency for the House of Commons
- Dublin St Patrick's constituency within Dublin, as it existed from 1885 to 1918.

- Dublin within Ireland. Map utilises the modern administrative boundaries.
- Borough: Dublin

1885–1922
- Seats: 1
- Created from: Dublin City
- Replaced by: Dublin South

St Patrick's, a division of Dublin, was a borough constituency in Ireland. It returned one Member of Parliament (MP) to the United Kingdom House of Commons from 1885 until 1922.

After Irish independence in 1922, the area was no longer represented in the UK Parliament.

== Boundaries ==
This constituency was named for St Patrick's Cathedral and comprised the south-west part of the city of Dublin.

From 1885 to 1918, it was defined as:

The Merchants' Quay, Usher's Quay and Wood Quay wards of the borough of Dublin.

From 1918 to 1922, it was defined as:

The Merchants' Quay and Wood Quay wards of the County Borough of Dublin.

== History ==
Prior to the 1885 general election, the city was the undivided two-member Dublin City constituency. Under the Redistribution of Seats Act 1885, Dublin was divided into four divisions: St Patrick's, College Green, Dublin Harbour and St Stephen's Green.

Under the Redistribution of Seats (Ireland) Act 1918, the city was allocated seven seats: in addition to the four existing constituencies, the new divisions were Clontarf, St James's and St Michan's. St Patrick's lost territory to St James's.

Sinn Féin used this election to elect members of Dáil Éireann, inviting all those elected in Ireland to sit as a Teachta Dála (known in English as a Deputy) in the Dáil, although only the Sinn Féin members attended. St Patrick's in 1918 gave Sinn Féin 66% of the vote. Constance Markievicz was the first woman to win a seat in the House of Commons of the United Kingdom, at the first election where women were permitted to stand as candidates.

Under the Government of Ireland Act 1920, the area was combined with the St Stephen's Green Division to form Dublin South, a 4-seat constituency for the Southern Ireland House of Commons and a single-seat constituency at Westminster. At the 1921 election for the Southern Ireland House of Commons, the four seats were won uncontested by Sinn Féin, who treated it as part of the election to the Second Dáil. Constance Markievicz was one of the four TDs for Dublin South.

Under s. 1(4) of the Irish Free State (Agreement) Act 1922, no writ was to be issued "for a constituency in Ireland other than a constituency in Northern Ireland". Therefore, no vote was held in Dublin South at the 1922 United Kingdom general election on 15 November 1922, shortly before the Irish Free State left the United Kingdom on 6 December 1922.

== Members of Parliament ==
From	To	Name	Party
1885	1892	William Martin Murphy	Nationalist (IPP) (Note: Irish National Federation (Anti-Parnellite) from December 1890.)
1892	1918	William Field	Irish National League (Parnellite) (IPP)
1918	1922	Constance Markievicz	Sinn Féin

== Elections ==
=== Elections in the 1880s ===
1885 general election: Dublin St. Patrick's
Party	Candidate	Votes	%	±%
Irish Parliamentary	William Martin Murphy	5,330	82.1	
Irish Conservative	Maurice Edward Dockrell	1,162	17.9	
Majority		4,168	64.2	
Turnout		6,492	72.5	
Registered electors		8,952		
Irish Parliamentary win (new seat)				

1886 general election: Dublin St. Patrick's
Party	Candidate	Votes	%	±%
Irish Parliamentary	William Martin Murphy	Unopposed		
Irish Parliamentary hold				

=== Elections in the 1890s ===
1892 general election: Dublin St. Patrick's
Party	Candidate	Votes	%	±%
Irish National League	William Field	3,694	76.9	N/A
Irish National Federation	William Martin Murphy	1,110	23.1	N/A
Majority		2,584	53.8	N/A
Turnout		4,804	66.2	N/A
Registered electors		7,261		
Irish National League gain from Irish Parliamentary		Swing	N/A	

1895 general election: Dublin St. Patrick's
Party	Candidate	Votes	%	±%
Irish National League	William Field	Unopposed		
Irish National League hold				

=== Elections in the 1900s ===
1900 general election: Dublin St Patrick's
Party	Candidate	Votes	%	±%
Irish Parliamentary	William Field	Unopposed		
Irish Parliamentary hold				

1906 general election: Dublin St. Patrick's
Party	Candidate	Votes	%	±%
Irish Parliamentary	William Field	Unopposed		
Irish Parliamentary hold				

=== Elections in the 1910s ===
January 1910 general election: Dublin St. Patrick's
Party	Candidate	Votes	%	±%
Irish Parliamentary	William Field	Unopposed		
Irish Parliamentary hold				

December 1910 general election: Dublin St. Patrick's
Party	Candidate	Votes	%	±%
Irish Parliamentary	William Field	Unopposed		
Irish Parliamentary hold				

1918 general election: Dublin St Patrick's
Party	Candidate	Votes	%	±%
Sinn Féin	Constance de Markievicz	7,835	65.85	New
Irish Parliamentary	William Field	3,752	31.53	N/A
Ind. Nationalist	James Joseph Kelly	312	2.62	New
Majority		4,083	34.32	N/A
Turnout		11,899	63.34	N/A
Registered electors		18,785		
Sinn Féin gain from Irish Parliamentary		Swing		

== Notes, citations and sources ==
=== Sources ===
- Walker, B.M., ed. (1978). Parliamentary Election Results in Ireland, 1801–1922. Dublin: Royal Irish Academy. pp. 346, 388. ISBN 0901714127.
- Boundary Commission (Ireland) established in 1917 to redistribute seats in the House of Commons under the terms of the Representation of the People Bill, 1917 (1917). "Schedule 10 : Parliamentary borough of Dublin" ( (PDF)). Report. Vol. CSO/RP/1917/29520/36. National Archives of Ireland. Archived from the original on 4 December 2017.

=== External links ===
- Oireachtas Members Database
- Dublin Historic Maps: Parliamentary & Dail Constituencies 1780–1969 (a work in progress)
