= Dublin Clontarf (UK Parliament constituency) =

Westminster constituency (1918–1922)

- Former borough constituency for the House of Commons

1918–1922
- Seats: 1
- Created from: North Dublin
- Replaced by: Dublin North-West

Clontarf, a division of the parliamentary borough of Dublin, was a parliamentary constituency which returned one Member of Parliament (MP) to the House of Commons of the United Kingdom from 1918 until 1922. From 1918 to 1921, it was also used as a constituency for Dáil Éireann.

== Boundaries ==
It predominantly comprised the area of Clontarf which had been brought into the jurisdiction of the city in 1900, since the last time of a revision of constituencies. It was defined as:

Clontarf East, Clontarf West and Drumcondra Municipal Wards of the Borough, and that part of Mountjoy Municipal Ward which is not included in the Dublin Harbour Division.

== History ==
Under the Redistribution of Seats Act 1885, the parliamentary borough of Dublin had been divided into four divisions: College Green, Dublin Harbour, St Stephen's Green and St Patrick's. Under the Redistribution of Seats (Ireland) Act 1918, the city was allocated three additional seats: Dublin Clontarf, St James's and St Michan's.

At the 1918 general election, Sinn Féin issued an election manifesto in which it called for a "establishment of a constituent assembly comprising persons chosen by Irish constituencies". After the election, Sinn Féin invited all those elected for Irish constituencies to sit as members of Dáil Éireann, termed Teachta Dála (or TD, known in English as a Deputy). In practice, only those elected for Sinn Féin attended. This included Richard Mulcahy, elected for Clontarf.

Under the Government of Ireland Act 1920, the area was combined with the St James's and St Michan's Divisions to form Dublin North-West, a 4-seat constituency for the Southern Ireland House of Commons and a single-seat constituency at Westminster. At the 1921 election for the Southern Ireland House of Commons, the four seats were won uncontested by Sinn Féin, who treated it as part of the election to the Second Dáil. Richard Mulcahy was one of the four TDs for Dublin North-West.

Under s. 1(4) of the Irish Free State (Agreement) Act 1922, no writ was to be issued "for a constituency in Ireland other than a constituency in Northern Ireland". Therefore, no vote was held in Dublin North-West at the 1922 United Kingdom general election on 15 November 1922, shortly before the Irish Free State left the United Kingdom on 6 December 1922.

== Members of Parliament ==
Year	MP	Party
1918	Richard Mulcahy	Sinn Féin
1922	constituency abolished	

== Elections ==
General election, 14 December 1918: Dublin Clontarf
Party	Candidate	Votes	%	±%
Sinn Féin	Richard Mulcahy	5,974	64.92	
Irish Parliamentary	Patrick Shortall	3,228	35.08	
Majority		2,746	29.84	
Turnout		9,202	63.08	
Sinn Féin win (new seat)				

== Notes, citations and sources ==
=== Sources ===
- Walker, Brian M., ed. (1978). Parliamentary Election Results in Ireland, 1801–1922. Dublin: Royal Irish Academy. p. 388. ISBN 0901714127.
- Boundary Commission (Ireland) established in 1917 to redistribute seats in the House of Commons under the terms of the Representation of the People Bill, 1917 (1917). "Schedule 10 : Parliamentary borough of Dublin" ( (PDF)). Report. Vol. CSO/RP/1917/29520/36. National Archives of Ireland. Archived from the original on 4 December 2017.

=== External links ===
- Dáil Éireann Members Database Office of the Houses of the Oireachtas
- Dublin Historic Maps: Parliamentary & Dail Constituencies 1780–1969 (a work in progress)
