= Dublin St James's =

Westminster constituency (1918–1922)

- Former borough constituency for the House of Commons

1918–1922
- Seats: 1
- Created from: Dublin St Patrick's and South Dublin
- Replaced by: Dublin North-West

St James's, a division of Dublin, was a UK parliamentary constituency in Ireland. It returned one Member of Parliament (MP) to the British House of Commons from 1918 to 1922, using the first past the post electoral system.

From the dissolution of 1922, the area was no longer represented in the UK Parliament.

== Boundaries ==
The St James's was a division of the parliamentary borough of Dublin defined as:

the New Kilmainham and Usher's Quay Wards of the Borough

== History ==
Dublin St James's was created under the Redistribution of Seats (Ireland) Act 1918 following recommendations of the 1917 Boundary Commission, which increased the parliamentary representation of the county borough of Dublin from four divisions to seven. Under the Redistribution of Seats Act 1885, the city had been divided into four constituencies: the Dublin College Green, Dublin Harbour, Dublin St Patrick's and Dublin St Stephen's Green constituencies. In 1918, the city was allocated seven seats: the existing four constituencies, and three new constituencies of Dublin St James's, Dublin Clontarf and Dublin St Michan's. The increase in seats reflected both the increase in population and the expansion of the city area. The Kilmainham area had been brought into the city under the Dublin Corporation Act 1900 (63 & 64 Vict. c. cclxiv).

The constituency was used at only one election, the 1918 general election. Sinn Féin used this to elect members of Dáil Éireann, inviting all those elected in Ireland to sit as a Teachta Dála (known in English as a Deputy) in the Dáil, although only the Sinn Féin members attended.

Under the Government of Ireland Act 1920, the area was combined with Dublin Clontarf and Dublin St Michan's to form Dublin North-West, a 4-seat constituency for the Southern Ireland House of Commons and a single constituency at Westminster. At the 1921 election for the Southern Ireland House of Commons, the four seats were won uncontested by Sinn Féin, who treated it as part of the election to the Second Dáil. Joseph McGrath was one of the four TDs for Dublin North-West.

Under s. 1(4) of the Irish Free State (Agreement) Act 1922, no writ was to be issued "for a constituency in Ireland other than a constituency in Northern Ireland". Therefore, no vote was held in Dublin North-West at the 1922 United Kingdom general election on 15 November 1922, shortly before the Irish Free State left the United Kingdom on 6 December 1922.

== Members of Parliament ==
Election	Member	Party
1918	Joseph McGrath	Sinn Féin
1922	constituency abolished	

== Election ==
General election, 14 December 1918: Dublin St James's
Party	Candidate	Votes	%	±%
Sinn Féin	Joseph McGrath	6,256	80.08	
Ind. Nationalist	John Saturnus Kelly	1,556	19.92	
Majority		4,700	60.16	
Turnout		7,812	59.54	
Sinn Féin win (new seat)				
