= Michael Staines =

Irish politician (1885–1955)

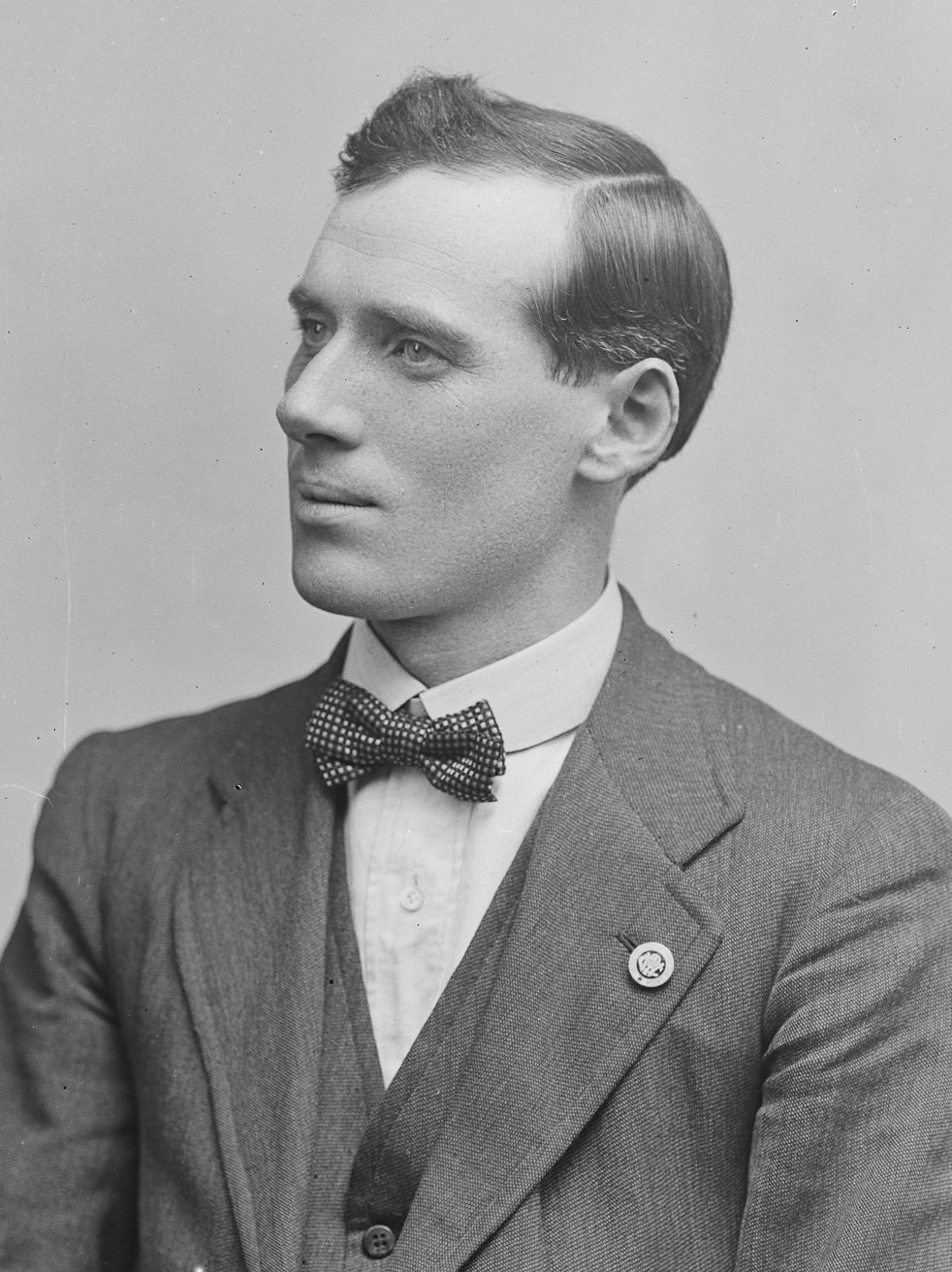
- Staines in 1918

1st Garda Commissioner
- In office April 1922 – September 1922
- Deputy: Patrick Walsh
- Succeeded by: Eoin O'Duffy

Teachta Dála
- In office May 1921 – August 1923
- Constituency: Dublin North-West
- In office December 1918 – May 1921
- Constituency: Dublin St Michan's

Senator
- In office 12 December 1928 – 29 May 1936

Personal details
- Born: 1 April 1885 Newport, County Mayo, Ireland
- Died: 26 October 1955 (aged 70) Clontarf, Dublin, Ireland
- Spouse: Sheila Cullen (m. 1922)
- Children: 9

Military service
- Branch/service: Irish Republican Brotherhood; Irish National Army
- Battles/wars: Easter Rising; Irish War of Independence; Irish Civil War

Michael Joseph Staines (1 May 1885 – 26 October 1955) was an Irish republican, politician and Garda.

== Biography ==
Staines was born in Newport, County Mayo, his mother Margaret's home village, and where his father Edward was serving as a Royal Irish Constabulary (RIC) officer.

Staines was a member of the Irish Republican Brotherhood (IRB) and on its Supreme Council from 1921 to 1922. He served as Quartermaster General in the GPO during the 1916 Easter Rising and was later interned with his fellow insurgents at Frongoch internment camp. These men were served with internment orders under the Defence of the Realm Act 1914, which stated that they were "suspected of having honoured, promoted or assisted an armed insurrection against His Majesty". This meant that there were no charges, no court appearances and no pleas. Staines was elected Commandant of the prisoners after the former Commandant J. J. O'Connell was sent to Reading Gaol on 30 June. W.J. Brennan-Whitmore described Staines as: "a highly efficient officer who earned the love and respect of every individual prisoner." The attempts to conscript men in Frongoch to the British Army proved to be a serious source of disagreement between the prisoners and the camp authorities. The prisoners felt that it was ludicrous to expect Irish rebels to fight for Britain and the Crown. In addition, they were concerned that acceptance of conscription in Frongoch might be a prelude to the introduction of conscription in Ireland. Roughly sixty men in Frongoch had lived in Great Britain before the Rising and they were accordingly deemed liable for conscription. Staines, whom W. J. Brennan-Whitmore describes as maintaining "a very difficult position with remarkable efficiency and tact" throughout the conscription troubles which took place in Frongoch, took up a very resolute attitude on the question of identification. He asked Colonel F.A. Heygate-Lambert, Camp Commandant if he expected the prisoner leaders to identify comrades of theirs for military service in the British Army. To this Heygate-Lambert replied that it was the leaders' duty to identify men for all purposes. Staines retorted that by identifying the men for military service they would be lowering themselves to the level of spies and informers.

On his release from internment in Frongoch, he collaborated with Éamon de Valera, James Ryan, Eamonn Duggan and others in founding the New Ireland Assurance Collecting Society, in furtherance of the Sinn Féin policy of investment in Ireland. He was elected Director for Supply for Sinn Féin on 27 October 1917. He was also elected as a Sinn Féin MP for the Dublin St Michan's constituency at the 1918 general election. He attended Dáil Éireann, working closely with the legal side of government. At the 1920 Dublin Corporation election, he was elected as an alderman. He was re-elected in 1921 and 1922 for the Dublin North-West constituency.

He was on the Grangegorman Psychiatric Hospital Board.

=== First Garda Commissioner ===
Staines was the first-ever commissioner of the Garda Síochána. Upon his appointment, Staines stated:

The Garda Síochána will succeed not by force of arms or numbers, but on their moral authority as servants of the people.

— Michael Staines

Appointed in April 1922, it was Staines who became the first active recruitment of Gardai in Ireland, and it was Staines who chose the badge and name for the new force. Under pressure to bring law and order to the newly created Irish state, Staines recruited former members of the Royal Irish Constabulary to senior positions, including appointed former RIC man Patrick Walsh as the first Deputy Commissioner. These decisions were not popular and Staines was forced to retreat from the Kildare Depot during the Civic Guard Mutiny by recruits the following month. Preceding the forthcoming Irish Civil War by a few short months, it was not until mid-July that Staines was able to regain control of the Kildare Deport on condition an inquiry be set up. Staines' authority over the Gardai was never fully restored and Staines was replaced as commissioner by Eoin O'Duffy in September 1922. Prior to the formation of the Garda, Staines and O'Duffy had acted as liaisons between the RIC and the Irish Republican Police during the Truce which preceded the Anglo-Irish Treaty. Staines was able to try and save face over this replacement by stating the inquiry had recommended the Gardai be divorced from politics, and that Staines recent election to the Dáil thus precluded him from being their main authority.

=== Later career ===
Staines did not contest the 1923 Irish general election but remained in politics, serving as a member of Dublin Corporation. In December 1928 Staines joined the Free State Seanad. In the late 1930s he attempted to rejoin national politics and contested the 1937, 1938, and 1943 general elections in the Dublin North-West constituency, but was unsuccessful each time.

Although involved in an insurance company and for a time the operator of a warehouse, in his later life Staines struggled to hold down employment. In 1939 members of Fine Gael had to fundraise for him. In 1941 he found some work as a "temporary clerk" in the Great Southern Railways company.

Staines died in his Dublin home on 27 October 1955, leaving a wife and 9 children behind.

== Gallery ==
Michael Staines (1918)

British Army intelligence file for Michael Staines

Parliament of the United Kingdom
New constituency	Member of Parliament for Dublin St Michan's; 1918–1922	Constituency abolished
Oireachtas
New constituency	Teachta Dála for Dublin St Michan's; 1918–1921	Constituency abolished

Dáil	Election	Deputy (Party)	Deputy (Party)	Deputy (Party)	Deputy (Party)
2nd	1921	Philip Cosgrave (SF)	Joseph McGrath (SF)	Richard Mulcahy (SF)	Michael Staines (SF)
3rd	1922	Philip Cosgrave (PT-SF)	Joseph McGrath (PT-SF)	Richard Mulcahy (PT-SF)	Michael Staines (PT-SF)
4th	1923	Constituency abolished. See Dublin North			

Dáil	Election	Deputy (Party)	Deputy (Party)	Deputy (Party)	Deputy (Party)	Deputy (Party)
9th	1937	Seán T. O'Kelly (FF)	A. P. Byrne (Ind)	Cormac Breathnach (FF)	Patrick McGilligan (FG)	Archie Heron (Lab)
10th	1938	Seán T. O'Kelly (FF)	A. P. Byrne (Ind)	Cormac Breathnach (FF)	Patrick McGilligan (FG)	Eamonn Cooney (FF)
11th	1943	Seán T. O'Kelly (FF)	A. P. Byrne (Ind)	Cormac Breathnach (FF)	Patrick McGilligan (FG)	Martin O'Sullivan (Lab)
12th	1944	Seán T. O'Kelly (FF)	John S. O'Connor (FF)	Cormac Breathnach (FF)	Patrick McGilligan (FG)	Martin O'Sullivan (Lab)
12th	1945 by-election	Vivion de Valera (FF)	John S. O'Connor (FF)	Cormac Breathnach (FF)	Patrick McGilligan (FG)	Martin O'Sullivan (Lab)
13th	1948	Mick Fitzpatrick (CnaP)	A. P. Byrne (Ind)	Cormac Breathnach (FF)	3 seats from 1948 to 1969	
14th	1951	Declan Costello (FG)	A. P. Byrne (Ind)	Cormac Breathnach (FF)	3 seats from 1948 to 1969	
14th	1952 by-election	Declan Costello (FG)	Thomas Byrne (Ind)	Cormac Breathnach (FF)	3 seats from 1948 to 1969	
15th	1954	Declan Costello (FG)	Thomas Byrne (Ind)	Richard Gogan (FF)	3 seats from 1948 to 1969	
16th	1957	Declan Costello (FG)	Thomas Byrne (Ind)	Richard Gogan (FF)	3 seats from 1948 to 1969	
17th	1961	Declan Costello (FG)	Michael Mullen (Lab)	Richard Gogan (FF)	3 seats from 1948 to 1969	
18th	1965	Declan Costello (FG)	Michael Mullen (Lab)	Richard Gogan (FF)	3 seats from 1948 to 1969	
19th	1969	Hugh Byrne (FG)	Jim Tunney (FF)	Richard Gogan (FF)	David Thornley (Lab)	4 seats from 1969 to 1977
20th	1973	Hugh Byrne (FG)	Jim Tunney (FF)	Richard Gogan (FF)	David Thornley (Lab)	4 seats from 1969 to 1977
21st	1977	Constituency abolished. See Dublin Finglas and Dublin Cabra				

Dáil	Election	Deputy (Party)	Deputy (Party)	Deputy (Party)	Deputy (Party)
22nd	1981	Jim Tunney (FF)	Michael Barrett (FF)	Mary Flaherty (FG)	Hugh Byrne (FG)
23rd	1982 (Feb)	Jim Tunney (FF)	Michael Barrett (FF)	Mary Flaherty (FG)	Proinsias De Rossa (WP)
24th	1982 (Nov)	Jim Tunney (FF)	Michael Barrett (FF)	Mary Flaherty (FG)	Proinsias De Rossa (WP)
25th	1987	Jim Tunney (FF)	Michael Barrett (FF)	Mary Flaherty (FG)	Proinsias De Rossa (WP)
26th	1989	Jim Tunney (FF)	Michael Barrett (FF)	Mary Flaherty (FG)	Proinsias De Rossa (WP)
27th	1992	Noel Ahern (FF)	Róisín Shortall (Lab)	Mary Flaherty (FG)	Proinsias De Rossa (DL)
28th	1997	Noel Ahern (FF)	Róisín Shortall (Lab)	Pat Carey (FF)	Proinsias De Rossa (DL)
29th	2002	Noel Ahern (FF)	Róisín Shortall (Lab)	Pat Carey (FF)	3 seats from 2002
30th	2007	Noel Ahern (FF)	Róisín Shortall (Lab)	Pat Carey (FF)	3 seats from 2002
31st	2011	Dessie Ellis (SF)	Róisín Shortall (Lab)	John Lyons (Lab)	3 seats from 2002
32nd	2016	Dessie Ellis (SF)	Róisín Shortall (SD)	Noel Rock (FG)	3 seats from 2002
33rd	2020	Dessie Ellis (SF)	Róisín Shortall (SD)	Paul McAuliffe (FF)	3 seats from 2002
34th	2024	Dessie Ellis (SF)	Rory Hearne (SD)	Paul McAuliffe (FF)	3 seats from 2002
