= Mid Tyrone (UK Parliament constituency) =

Parliamentary constituency in the United Kingdom, 1885–1918

- Former county constituency for the House of Commons

1885–1918
- Seats: 1
- Created from: County Tyrone
- Replaced by: North East Tyrone and North West Tyrone

Mid Tyrone was a UK parliamentary constituency in Ireland. It returned one Member of Parliament (MP) to the British House of Commons from 1885 to 1918.

Before the 1885 general election the area was part of the County Tyrone constituency. From the dissolution of Parliament in 1918 Mid Tyrone was divided between the new North-East Tyrone and North-West Tyrone constituencies.

== Boundaries ==
This constituency comprised the central part of County Tyrone, consisting of the barony of East Omagh and that part of the barony of Strabane Upper not contained within the constituency of North Tyrone.

== Members of Parliament ==
From	To	Name	Party	Born	Died
1885	1895	Matthew Joseph Kenny	Nationalist (Irish Parliamentary Party)^{1}	1 February 1861	8 December 1942
1895	January 1910	George Murnaghan	Nationalist^{1}	4 July 1847	13 January 1929
January 1910	December 1910	Gerald Brunskill	Unionist	4 April 1866	4 October 1918
December 1910	1918	Richard McGhee	Nationalist	1851	1930

^{1}Anti-Parnellite Nationalist 1891–1900

== Elections ==
=== Elections in the 1880s ===
General election 1 December 1885: Tyrone Mid
Party	Candidate	Votes	%	±%
Irish Parliamentary	Matthew Joseph Kenny	4,299	61.8	
Irish Conservative	Hugh Hamilton Moore	2,657	38.2	
Majority		1,642	23.6	
Turnout		6,956	86.1	
Registered electors		8,083		
Irish Parliamentary win (new seat)				

General election 13 July 1886: Tyrone Mid
Party	Candidate	Votes	%	±%
Irish Parliamentary	Matthew Joseph Kenny	4,145	62.6	+0.8
Irish Conservative	Hugh Hamilton Moore	2,475	37.4	−0.8
Majority		1,670	25.2	+1.6
Turnout		6,620	81.9	−4.2
Registered electors		8,083		
Irish Parliamentary hold		Swing	+0.8	

=== Elections in the 1890s ===
General election 8 July 1892: Tyrone Mid
Party	Candidate	Votes	%	±%
Irish National Federation	Matthew Joseph Kenny	3,667	57.4	−5.2
Irish Unionist	Edward Charles Thompson	2,598	40.7	+3.3
Irish National Federation	George Noble Plunkett	123	1.9	N/A
Majority		1,069	16.7	−8.5
Turnout		6,388	83.2	+1.3
Registered electors		7,678		
Irish National Federation gain from Irish Parliamentary		Swing	−4.3	

General election 26 July 1895: Tyrone Mid
Party	Candidate	Votes	%	±%
Irish National Federation	George Murnaghan	3,759	62.5	+5.1
Liberal Unionist	Edward Charles Thompson	2,252	37.5	−3.2
Majority		1,507	25.0	+8.3
Turnout		6,011	79.8	−3.4
Registered electors		7,531		
Irish National Federation hold		Swing	+4.2	

=== Elections in the 1900s ===
General election 6 October 1900: Tyrone Mid
Party	Candidate	Votes	%	±%
Irish Parliamentary	George Murnaghan	Unopposed		
Registered electors		7,560		
Irish Parliamentary hold				

General election 19 January 1906: Tyrone Mid
Party	Candidate	Votes	%	±%
Irish Parliamentary	George Murnaghan	Unopposed		
Registered electors		6,795		
Irish Parliamentary hold				

=== Elections in the 1910s ===
General election 24 January 1910: Tyrone Mid
Party	Candidate	Votes	%	±%
Irish Unionist	Gerald Brunskill	2,475	42.8	New
Irish Parliamentary	John Valentine	2,070	35.8	N/A
Ind. Nationalist	George Murnaghan	1,244	21.5	New
Majority		405	7.0	N/A
Turnout		5,789	88.9	N/A
Registered electors		6,512		
Irish Unionist gain from Irish Parliamentary		Swing	N/A	

McGhee

General election 12 December 1910: Tyrone Mid
Party	Candidate	Votes	%	±%
Irish Parliamentary	Richard McGhee	3,102	56.6	+20.8
Irish Unionist	Gerald Brunskill	2,379	43.4	+0.6
Majority		723	13.2	N/A
Turnout		5,481	84.2	−4.7
Registered electors		6,512		
Irish Parliamentary gain from Irish Unionist		Swing	+10.1	
