= Belfast Cromac (UK Parliament constituency) =

Parliamentary constituency in the United Kingdom, 1918–1922

- Former borough constituency for the House of Commons

1918–1922
- Seats: 1
- Created from: Belfast South
- Replaced by: Belfast South

Cromac, a division of Belfast, was a UK parliamentary constituency in Ireland. It returned one Member of Parliament (MP) to the House of Commons of the United Kingdom from 1918 to 1922, using the first past the post electoral system.

== Boundaries and boundary changes ==
The constituency was created by the Redistribution of Seats (Ireland) Act 1918 and comprised the western half of South Belfast, and contained the Cromac and Windsor wards of Belfast Corporation.

Prior to the 1918 general election and after the dissolution of Parliament in 1922 the area was part of the Belfast South constituency.

== Politics ==
The constituency was a predominantly Unionist area, with some Labour support. In the 1918 election Sinn Féin came third.

== First Dáil ==
After the 1918 election, Sinn Féin invited all those elected for constituencies in Ireland to sit as TDs in Dáil Éireann rather than in the House of Commons of the United Kingdom. All those elected for Irish constituencies were included in the roll of the Dáil but only those elected for Sinn Féin sat in the First Dáil. In May 1921, the Dáil passed a resolution declaring that elections to the House of Commons of Northern Ireland and the House of Commons of Southern Ireland would be used as the election for the Second Dáil and that the First Dáil would be dissolved on the assembly of the new body. The area of Belfast Cromac was then represented in the Dáil by the four-seat constituency of Belfast South, which also returned no representatives for Sinn Féin.

== Members of Parliament ==
Election	Member	Party
1918	William Arthur Lindsay	Irish Unionist
May 1921	William Arthur Lindsay	Ulster Unionist
1922	William Arthur Lindsay	constituency abolished

== Election ==
General Election 14 December 1918: Belfast Cromac
Party	Candidate	Votes	%	±%
Irish Unionist	William Arthur Lindsay	11,459	76.58	
Belfast Labour	James Freeland	2,508	16.76	
Sinn Féin	Archibald Savage	997	6.66	
Majority		8,951	59.82	
Turnout		21,673	69.04	
Irish Unionist win (new seat)				

== See also ==
- List of UK Parliament Constituencies in Ireland and Northern Ireland
- List of MPs elected in the 1918 United Kingdom general election
- Historic Dáil constituencies
