= North East Tyrone =

Parliamentary constituency in the United Kingdom, 1918–1922

- Former county constituency for the House of Commons

1918–1922
- Seats: 1
- Created from: East Tyrone and Mid Tyrone
- Replaced by: Fermanagh and Tyrone

North East Tyrone was a parliamentary constituency in Ireland. From 1918 to 1922 it returned one Member of Parliament (MP) to the House of Commons of the Parliament of the United Kingdom, elected by the first-past-the-post voting system.

== Boundaries and Boundary Changes ==
This county constituency comprised the north-eastern part of County Tyrone, consisting of that part of Cookstown Rural District not contained within the constituency of South Tyrone, that part of Dungannon Rural District consisting of the district electoral divisions of Altmore, Meenagh and Mountjoy, that part of Omagh Rural District not contained within the North West Tyrone and South Tyrone constituencies, and Cookstown and Omagh Urban Districts.

Prior to the 1918 United Kingdom general election the area was the East Tyrone and part of the Mid Tyrone constituencies. From the dissolution of Parliament in 1922 North East Tyrone became part of the Fermanagh and Tyrone seat.

== Politics ==
The constituency was a predominantly Nationalist area in 1918. The Unionists had significant but minority support. There was little chance of a Sinn Féin candidate being elected.

== The First Dáil ==
Sinn Féin contested the 1918 general election on the platform that instead of taking up any seats they won in the United Kingdom Parliament, they would establish a revolutionary assembly in Dublin. In republican theory every MP elected in Ireland was a potential Deputy to this assembly. In practice only the Sinn Féin members accepted the offer.

The revolutionary First Dáil assembled on 21 January 1919 and last met on 10 May 1921. The First Dáil, according to a resolution passed on 10 May 1921, was formally dissolved on the assembling of the Second Dáil. This took place on 16 August 1921.

A letter from Thomas Harbison, MP was read to the revolutionary Dáil Éireann on 22 January 1919. The entry in the official report was:-

"Mr. T.J. HARBISON, teachta for N.E. Tyrone, wrote acknowledging invitation to attend the Dáil, which invitation he stated he should decline for obvious reasons. He expressed his entire sympathy with the demand of Ireland for a hearing of her just Cause at the Congress of the Nations. The contents of the letter were ordered to be published".

In 1921 Sinn Féin decided to use the UK authorised elections for the Northern Ireland House of Commons and the House of Commons of Southern Ireland as a poll for the Irish Republic's Second Dáil. Tyrone North-East, in republican theory, was incorporated in an eight-member Dáil constituency of Fermanagh and Tyrone.

== Members of Parliament ==
Election	Member	Party
1918	Thomas Harbison	Nationalist
1922	constituency abolished	

== Election ==
The election in this constituency took place using the first past the post electoral system.

General Election 14 December 1918: North East Tyrone
Party	Candidate	Votes	%	±%
Irish Nationalist	Thomas Harbison	11,605	63.27	
Irish Unionist	King Houston	6,681	36.42	
Sinn Féin	Seán Milroy	56	0.31	
Majority		4,924	26.85	
Turnout		18,342	79.67	
Irish Nationalist win (new seat)				

== See also ==
- List of UK Parliament Constituencies in Ireland and Northern Ireland
- List of MPs elected in the 1918 United Kingdom general election
