= North West Tyrone =

Parliamentary constituency in the United Kingdom, 1918–1922

- Former county constituency for the House of Commons
- County: County Tyrone

1918–1922
- Seats: 1
- Created from: Mid Tyrone; North Tyrone
- Replaced by: Fermanagh and Tyrone

North West Tyrone was a United Kingdom parliamentary constituency in Ireland. It returned one Member of Parliament (MP) to the House of Commons of the United Kingdom from 1918 to 1922, on the electoral system of first past the post.

== Boundaries ==
This county constituency comprised the north-western part of County Tyrone, consisting of the rural districts of Castlederg, Strabane No. 1, and Trillick, that part of the rural district of Omagh comprising the district electoral divisions of Camderry, Clanabogan, Dromore, Drumquin, Greenan, Lisnacreaght, Moyle, Mullagharn and Tullyclunagh, and the urban district of Strabane.

Prior to the 1918 United Kingdom general election the area was the North Tyrone and part of the Mid Tyrone constituencies. From the dissolution of Parliament in 1922 North West Tyrone became part of the Fermanagh and Tyrone seat.

== Politics ==
The constituency was a predominantly Sinn Féin area in 1918. The Unionists had significant but minority support.

Arthur Griffith was also elected for East Cavan, but as he did not take his seat in the United Kingdom House of Commons he could not choose which area he would represent and trigger a by-election in the other.

Griffith died on 12 August 1922. Sinn Féin MPs were not prepared to attend the House of Commons, to apply for the writ for a by-election, so this seat was vacant at the dissolution of Parliament on 26 October 1922.

== The First Dáil ==
Sinn Féin contested the 1918 general election on the platform that instead of taking up any seats they won in the United Kingdom Parliament, they would establish a revolutionary assembly in Dublin. In republican theory every MP elected in Ireland was a potential Deputy to this assembly. In practice only the Sinn Féin members accepted the offer.

The revolutionary First Dáil assembled on 21 January 1919 and last met on 10 May 1921. The First Dáil, according to a resolution passed on 10 May 1921, was formally dissolved on the assembling of the Second Dáil. This took place on 16 August 1921.

In 1921 Sinn Féin decided to use the UK authorised elections for the Northern Ireland House of Commons and the House of Commons of Southern Ireland as a poll for the Irish Republic's Second Dáil. Tyrone North West, in republican theory, was incorporated in an eight-member Dáil constituency of Fermanagh and Tyrone.

== Member of Parliament 1918–1922 ==
Election	Member	Party
1918	Arthur Griffith	Sinn Féin
1922	Constituency abolished	

== Election ==
The election in this constituency took place using the first past the post electoral system.

General Election 14 December 1918: North West Tyrone
Party	Candidate	Votes	%	±%
Sinn Féin	Arthur Griffith	10,442	57.57	
Irish Unionist	William Thomas Miller	7,696	42.43	
Majority		2,746	15.14	
Turnout		18,138	81.77	
Sinn Féin win (new seat)				

== See also ==
- List of United Kingdom Parliament constituencies in Ireland and Northern Ireland
- List of MPs elected in the 1918 United Kingdom general election
