= Royal Commission on the Poorer Classes in Ireland =

The Royal Commission for inquiring into the condition of the poorer classes in Ireland was an initiative to investigate the causes of widespread destitution in Ireland at the beginning of the 19th century. The Commission conducted its extensive survey over three years, from 1833 until 1836, during which time it published various reports of its findings and recommendations, some of which informed the Poor Relief (Ireland) Act 1838.

The commissioners were:

- Richard Whately, Church of Ireland archbishop of Dublin
- Daniel Murray, Roman Catholic archbishop of Dublin
- Charles Vignoles, railway engineer
- Richard More O'Ferrall (first report only) MP for County Kildare
- James Carlile, commissioner to the Irish board of national education
- Fenton Hort, relative of Sir Josiah Hort, 2nd Baronet
- John Corrie, a Unitarian minister
- James Lenox William Naper, landowner and High Sheriff of Meath
- William Battie-Wrightson, landowner and Whig politician
- Arthur Plunkett, Lord Killeen (from second report)
- Anthony Richard Blake (from second report) Dublin Castle administration official
- James Ebenezer Bicheno (from second report)

== Publications ==
- First Report, Appendix A and Supplement 8 July 1835
  - Appendix A: Deserted and Orphan Children; Bastardy; Widows, having Families of young Children; the Impotent through Age; Sick Poor; Able-bodied out of work; Vagrancy
    - Supplement: Answers to Questions circulated by the Commissioners relative to the Relief of the Destitute Classes in Ireland.
- Appendix B and Supplement Parts I and II 8 July 1835
  - General Reports Upon the Existing System of Public Medical Relief in Ireland;
  - Local Reports Upon Dispensaries. Fever Hospitals, County Infirmaries, and Lunatic Asylums;
  - with Supplement, Parts I. & II. Containing Answers to Questions From the Officers, &c. of Medical Institutions.
- Second Report 1836
  - the various institutions at present established by law for the relief of the poor
- Third Report 1836
- Appendix C Parts I and II 1836
  - Part I. Reports on the State of the Poor, and on the Charitable Institutions in Some of the Principal Towns [Belfast, Cork, Drogheda, Derry, Bandon, Limerick, Waterford]
    - with Supplement Containing Answers to Queries.
  - Part II. Report on the City of Dublin,
    - and Supplement Containing Answers to Queries;
    - with Addenda to Appendix (A.), and Communications.
- Appendix D and Supplement 1836
  - Baronial Examinations Relative to Earnings of Labourers, Cottier Tenants, Employment of Women and Children, Expenditure;
    - and Supplement, Containing Answers to Questions 1 to 12 Circulated by the Commissioners
- Appendix E and Supplement 1836
  - Baronial Examinations Relative to Food, Cottages and Cabins, Clothing and Furniture, Pawnbroking and Savings’ Banks, Drinking;
    - and Supplement, Answers to Questions 13 to 22 Circulated by the Commissioners.
- Appendix F and Supplement 1836
  - Baronial Examinations Relative to Con Acre, Quarter, Or Score Ground Small Tenantry, Consolidation of Farms, and Dislodged Tenantry, Emigration, Landlord and Tenant, Nature and State of Agriculture, Taxation, Roads, Observations on the Nature and State of Agriculture;
    - and Supplement, Containing Answers to Questions 23 to 35 Circulated by the Commissioners.
- Supplement II to Appendices D E F 1836
  - Returns From the Clerks of the Peace of Civil Bill Ejectments, From 1827 to 1833 (Both Years Inclusive), and
  - Answers to Queries From Magistrates Assembled At Petty Sessions.
- Appendix G
  - The State of the Irish Poor in Great Britain.
- Appendix H Part I 1836
  - Reasons For Recommending Voluntary Associations For the Relief of the Poor [signed by 8 commissioners]; and
  - Reasons For Dissenting From the Principle of Raising Funds For the Relief of The Poor by the Voluntary System, As Recommended in the Report [signed by the other 3 commissioners—Vignoles, Naper, and Plunkett]
  - Also, Tables, No. I., II., III., Referred to in Third Report, p. 1.
- Appendix H Part II 1836
  - Remarks on the Evidence Taken in the Poor Inquiry (Ireland), Contained in the Appendices (D.) (E.) (F.) by One of the Commissioners [J. E. Bicheno]
