= Irish poor laws =

Acts of Parliament to address poverty and social instability in Ireland

External image
- *Map of Poor Law Unions 1842–49

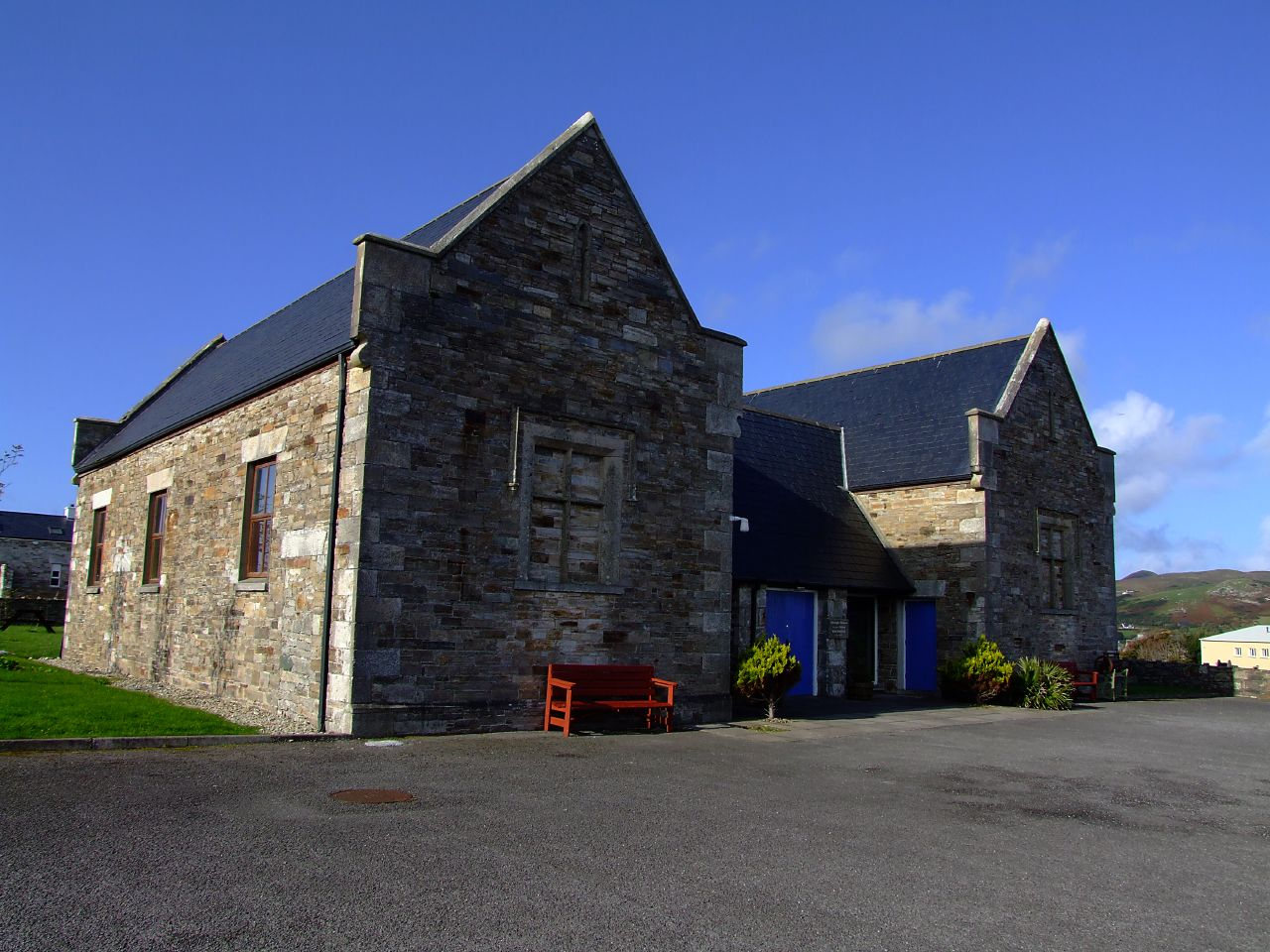
Former workhouse located in Dunfanaghy, County Donegal

The Irish poor laws were a series of acts of Parliament intended to address social instability due to widespread and persistent poverty in Ireland. While some legislation had been introduced by the pre-Union Parliament of Ireland prior to the Act of Union, the most radical and comprehensive attempt was the Poor Relief (Ireland) Act 1838 (1 & 2 Vict. c. 56), closely modelled on the English Poor Law Amendment Act 1834. In England, this replaced Elizabethan era legislation which had no equivalent in Ireland.

== Pre-Union ==
In 1703, the Irish Parliament passed an act, 2 Anne c. 19 (I), for "Providing the erection of a workhouse and for the maintenance and apprenticing out of foundling children" establishing the House of Industry in Dublin.

By 1771, there were Houses of Industry in every county and by 1833, the total cost was £32,967.

== Post-Union ==
Until 1838, the use of 'Houses of industry' was on a much smaller scale than in England and Wales.

=== Poor law unions ===
The report of the Royal Commission on the Poorer Classes in Ireland 1833 led to the Poor Relief (Ireland) Act 1838 (1 & 2 Vict. c. 56), under which three "poor law commissioners" divided Ireland into poor law unions, in which paupers would receive poor relief (either workhouse or outdoor relief) paid for by a poor rate based on a "poor law valuation". The name "union" was retained from the English "union of parishes" model although the Irish union boundaries diverged greatly from those of the civil parishes. A union was named after the town on which it was centred, where its workhouse was located. Unions were defined as groups of poor law electoral divisions, in turn defined as groups of townlands. Electoral divisions returned members to the board of guardians, with voters who paid higher rates having more votes. During and after the Great Famine, boundaries in the impoverished west were redrawn to create more and smaller union for easier administration. When the Irish General Register Office was established in 1864, each union became a superintendent registrar's district, with groups of electoral divisions forming a dispensary or registrar's district. The Local Government (Ireland) Act 1898 divided administrative counties into urban and rural districts, with each rural district corresponding to the non-urban portion of a poor law union within the county.

=== Emigration ===
During the Great Famine, workhouses became so overwhelmed that large numbers of paupers were assisted to emigrate. This had the effect of permitting more to enter the workhouse in the hope of escaping starvation and disease. In response, Guardian-assisted emigration was reserved only for those who had received indoor relief for over two years.

== After partition ==
Following the Partition of Ireland, in the independent Irish Free State, poor law unions and rural districts were abolished in 1925 and the powers of boards of guardians transferred to the county councils' County Boards of Health or County Boards of Public Assistance.

In Northern Ireland, poor law unions survived until the Northern Ireland Health and Social Care Service in 1948.

== See also ==
- Scottish poor laws
- English Poor Law
- List of Irish poor law unions
