= South Kerry =

South Kerry or Kerry South may refer to:

- The southern part of County Kerry, in Ireland
- South Kerry GAA, a Gaelic football Divisional Team in County Kerry
- South Kerry (UK Parliament constituency), former UK Parliament constituency
- Kerry South (Dáil constituency), former constituency for elections to Dáil Éireann
