= Kildare South =

Kildare South or South Kildare may refer to one of two parliamentary constituencies in County Kildare, Ireland:

- Kildare South (Dáil constituency) (since 2002)
- South Kildare (UK Parliament constituency) (1885–1922)

See also

- County Kildare
