= John Minch =

Irish rugby union player

- Full name: John Berchmans Minch
- Born: 29 July 1890 Athy, County Kildare, Ireland
- Died: 8 November 1942 (aged 52) British India
- School: Clongowes Wood College
- University: University College Dublin
- Notable relative(s): Matthew Minch (father); Sydney Minch (brother)

Rugby union career
- Position: Centre
International career
Years	Team	Apps	(Points)
1912–14	Ireland	5	(0)

Lieutenant colonel John Berchmans Minch (29 July 1890 — 8 November 1942) was a British Army officer and Ireland international rugby union player of the 1910s.

== Biography ==
Born in Athy, County Kildare, Minch was the son of nationalist politician Matthew Minch and the younger brother of Sydney Minch, a member of the Teachta Dála. His family were well known brewers involved with the company Minch Malt. He attended Clongowes Wood College and University College Dublin, where he studied obstetrics.

Minch was the first player of Athy origins to be capped for Ireland, gaining the first of his five caps as a centre against the touring 1912–13 Springboks, while a Bective Rangers player.

Mobilised in 1914, Minch was commissioned to the Royal Army Medical Corps Special Reserve, participating in operations against the Mohmands in World War I. His wartime service was awarded with the 1914–15 Star, British War Medal and Victory Medal. He served again during World War II and died while on active service in India in 1942, aged 52.

== See also ==
- List of Ireland national rugby union players
