= Johnstownbridge =

Johnstownbridge Irish: Droichead Baile Sheáin
- Town
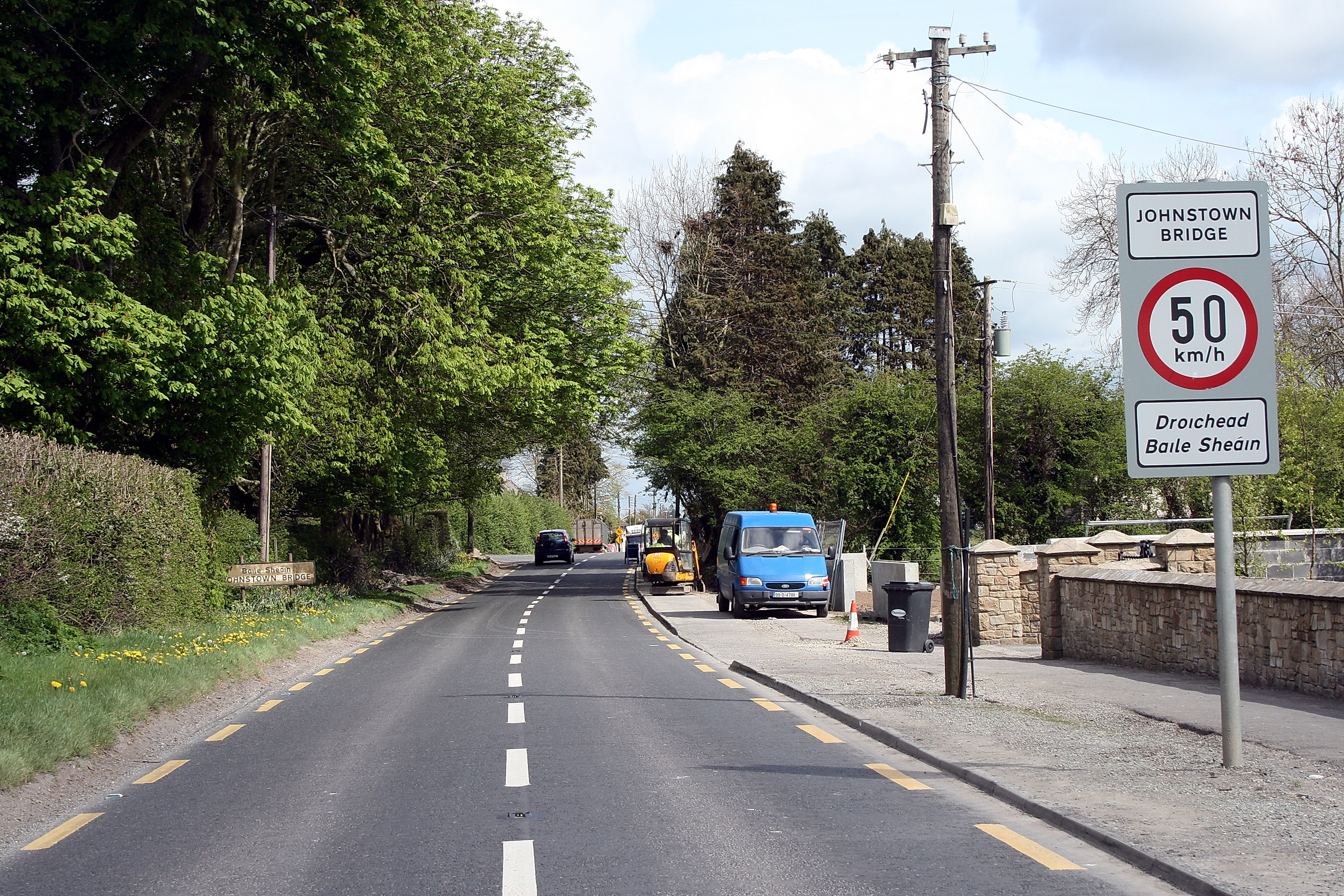
- Road signage entering Johnstown Bridge

- Location in Ireland
- Coordinates: 53°24′07″N 6°51′19″W
- Country: Ireland
- Province: Leinster
- County: County Kildare
- Elevation: 78 m (256 ft)

Population (2016)
  - Total: 683
- Time zone: UTC+0 (WET)
  - Summer (DST): UTC-1 (IST (WEST))
- Irish Grid Reference: N775412

Johnstownbridge (Irish: Baile Sheáin or Droichead Baile Sheáin) is a town located in north County Kildare, Ireland. It lies in the parish of Cadamstown, in the district of Balyna, and barony of Carbury. It is located on the R402 road between Enfield and Edenderry just off the M4 motorway. As of the 2016 census, Johnstownbridge had a population of 683 people, up from 211 in the 2002 census.

== History ==
A freestanding limestone cross of disputed provenance stands at Johnstown Crossroads dating to 1412.

The bridge was the scene of a battle in the 1798 rebellion between Michael Aylmer's rebel forces and British colonial forces. Johnstownbridge had a patent granted in the 17th century for holding a weekly market on Monday, but Lewis's Topography noted in 1837 that "this privilege has not been enjoyed for many years: fairs are held on March 31st, May 29th, Oct. 13th, and Dec. 21st." Lewis also noted "a curious old cross, the only relic to mark the site of an abbey that formerly existed here.". A constabulary police station was based here in the first half of the 19th century. One of Daniel O'Connell's colleagues in Irish independence movement Richard More O'Ferrall (1797–1880), MP for Kildare 1839-57 and 1859–65, lived in Balyna House.

== Amenities ==
The town is served by Saint Patrick's National School. The town's Gothic-style Catholic church dates to c.1830, and is also dedicated to Saint Patrick.

Johnstownbridge GAA, the local Gaelic Athletic Association club, has won the Kildare football championship three times and their camogie team has won multiple All-Ireland titles.

== Notable people ==
- Daniel Flynn – Kildare Senior footballer and former Australian rules footballer, grew up on a farm near Johnstownbridge
- Colonel Francis Forde (1718–1769) – Anglo-Irish military officer and East India Company officer, built and lived in Johnstown House, 1 km north of Johnstownbridge
- Major Edward Dudley Metcalfe (1887–1957) – British Indian Army officer and equerry to King Edward VIII, born and raised in Metcalfe Park House in Gorteen, Johnstownbridge
- Damien Molony – Irish actor, grew up in Johnstownbridge
- Rory O'Moore (1600-1655) - Leader of the 1641 Rebellion was likely born at Balyna House, 4km west of Johnstownbridge.
