= Ballyoan Cemetery =

Cemetery in Derry, Northern Ireland

Coordinates: 55.009°N 7.269°W

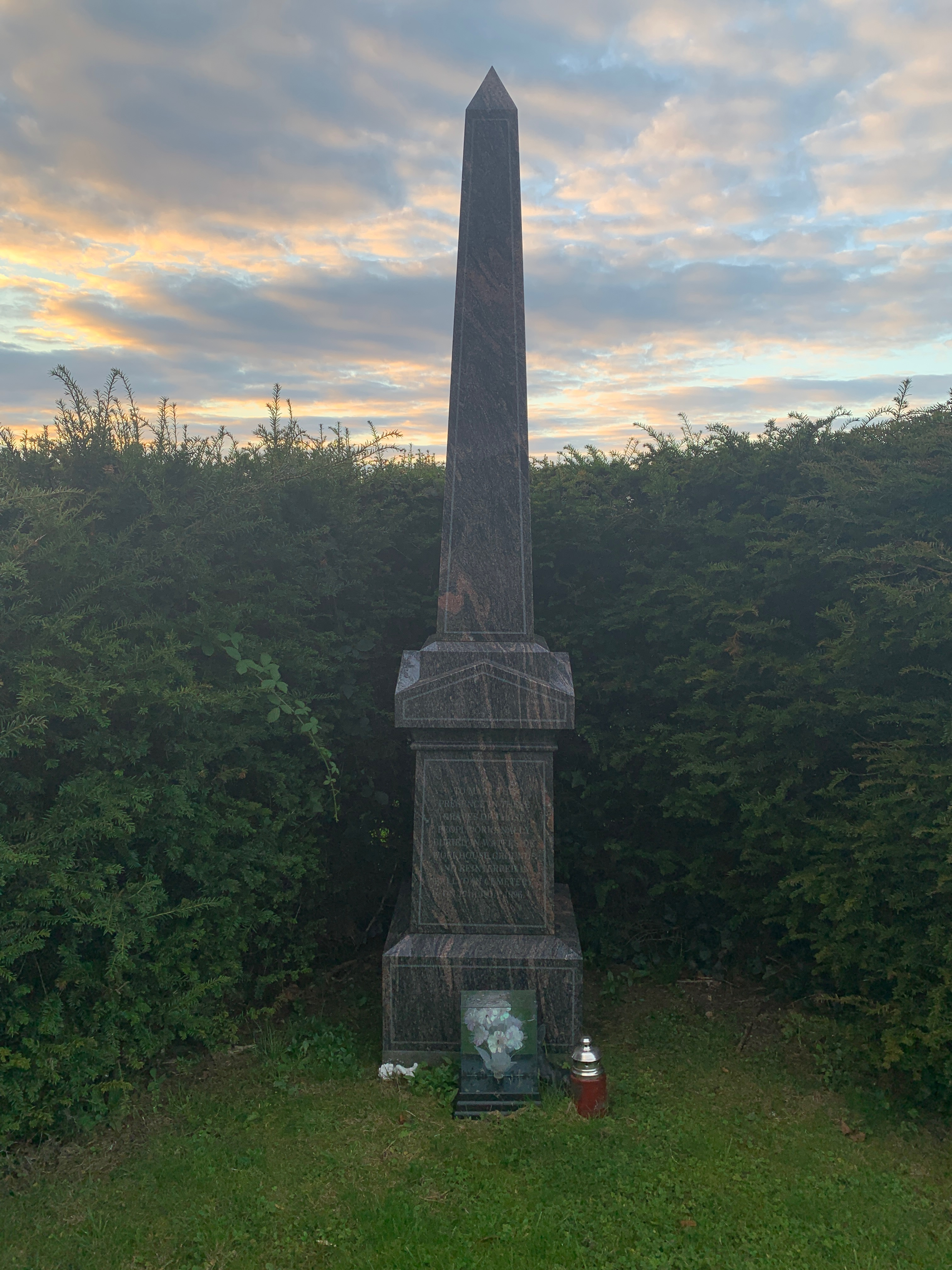
Memorial at Ballyoan to the people who died at the Waterside Workhouse.

Ballyoan Cemetery is a cemetery in Derry, Northern Ireland.

The cemetery is located on a hillside off the Rossdowney Road, Waterside, Derry. It looks out over the River Foyle and the city towards the Donegal Mountains. The cemetery was planned due to City Cemetery and the Altnagelvin Cemetery (instituted 1960) being full and was opened in 1991. Ballyoan itself is expected to reach capacity by the end of the 2020s.

In the mid-1990s, over 400 human remains were found at the Waterside Workhouse. These remains, believed to be of people who died during the Great Famine of the mid-19th century, were later interred in the cemetery.

The cemetery is not segregated like many others.

Derry City Council planned and built a Temple of Rest on site, but later changed its purpose to a cemetery caretaker's residence and then to a storage facility for council equipment. It is now empty and redundant.
