= 1869 County Kildare by-election =

UK parliamentary by-election

The 1869 County Kildare by-election was held on 11 January 1869. The by-election was prompted by the incumbent Liberal MP, Lord Otho Fitzgerald, being appointed Comptroller of the Household. Fitzgerald retained the seat unopposed.
