= Edward Ruthven =

Irish politician

Edward Ruthven (born 1796) was an Irish politician.

The son of Edward Southwell Ruthven, a Member of Parliament for Dublin City, Ruthven lived at Ballyfan House in County Kildare, and became a magistrate for both counties Down and Kildare.

At the 1832 UK general election, Ruthven stood in County Kildare for the Repeal Association, and won the seat. In Parliament, he argued for the confiscation of land belonging to the Church of Ireland, and for the revenue on the land to support the poor.

Ruthven was re-elected in 1835, but lost his seat at the 1837 UK general election.

Parliament of the United Kingdom
Preceded by Josiah Hort; Richard More O'Ferrall	Member of Parliament for County Kildare; 1832–1837; With: Richard More O'Ferrall	Succeeded by Robert Archbold; Richard More O'Ferrall
