= James Leahy =

Irish politician (1822–1896)

James Leahy (1822–1896) was an Irish nationalist politician who took his seat in the United Kingdom House of Commons as Member of Parliament (MP) for constituencies in County Kildare from 1880 to 1892.

He was the son of Daniel Leahy, a farmer of Templemore, Co. Tipperary. He was educated privately and was himself a tenant farmer. In 1850 he married Julia, daughter of John Mulhall, of Boyle, Co. Roscommon.

Leahy was first elected at the 1880 general election, as a Parnellite Home Rule League candidate for the County Kildare constituency, In the vital vote of 17 May 1880 in which Parnell displaced William Shaw as chairman of the Parliamentary Party, Leahy voted for Parnell. When the Kildare constituency was divided at the 1885 general election, he was returned unopposed for the South Kildare constituency. He was again elected unopposed in 1886, and sided with Parnell when the IPP split in 1891. However, at the 1892 general election he lost the seat by a wide margin to the Anti-Parnellite Irish National Federation candidate, Matthew Minch. He did not stand for parliament again, but appears to have remained an active Parnellite. He was present at the nomination of James Laurence Carew as Parnellite candidate for Dublin College Green on 6 April 1896.

Parliament of the United Kingdom
Preceded by William Cogan; Charles Henry Meldon	Member of Parliament for County Kildare; 1880–1885; With: Charles Henry Meldon	Constituency divided
New constituency	Member of Parliament for South Kildare; 1885–1892	Succeeded by Matthew Minch
