= 1887 South Kerry by-election =

UK Parliamentary by-election

The 1887 South Kerry by-election was a parliamentary by-election held for the United Kingdom House of Commons constituency of South Kerry on 27 September 1887. The vacancy arose because of the resignation of the sitting member, John O'Connor of the Irish Parliamentary Party. In the resulting by-election another Irish Parliamentary Party candidate, Denis Kilbride, a tenant farmer, was elected unopposed.
