= David O'Connor Henchy =

Irish politician

David O'Connor-Henchy (23 May 1810 – 1 December 1876) was an Irish Whig politician. From 1852 to 1859, he was one of the two Members of Parliament (MPs) for County Kildare, representing the county in the United Kingdom House of Commons.

He was born David O'Connor, the son of Valentine O'Connor and Mary Henchy, and adopted the additional surname of Henchy. He lived at Stonebrook, County Kildare.

He was appointed High Sheriff of Kildare for 1844–1845. He was first elected to the UK Parliament at the general election in July 1852, when he defeated a Conservative opponent to succeed the Marquess of Kildare as the second of Kilkare's two MPs. He was re-elected unopposed at the general election in 1857, pledged to support the creation of an independent Irish opposition, but did not stand again in 1859.

He married Elizabeth, the daughter of Sir John Burke, 2nd Baronet of Marble Hill, Co. Galway and was succeeded by his son Henry.

Parliament of the United Kingdom
Preceded by The Marquess of Kildare; William H. F. Cogan	Member of Parliament for County Kildare; 1852–1859; With: William H. F. Cogan	Succeeded by Richard More O'Ferrall; William H. F. Cogan
