= William H. F. Cogan =

Irish politician

William Henry Ford Cogan PC (1823 – 28 September 1894) was an Irish Whig (and later Liberal) politician. He was Member of Parliament (MP) for County Kildare from 1852 to 1880, representing the county in the United Kingdom House of Commons.

Cogan was first elected to the Parliament at a by-election on 13 March 1852, when he was returned unopposed after the Conservative MP Lord Naas was appointed as Chief Secretary for Ireland. He was re-elected at the general election in July 1852, when Kildare's two Whig MPs secured a large majority over a lone Conservative challenger. He was then returned unopposed in four successive general elections, and held the seat in 1874 against a strong challenge from Home Rule League candidates, one of whom defeated his fellow Liberal MP Lord Otho FitzGerald. He did not contest the 1880 general election, when Home Rulers took both seats in Kildare.

Cogan was the last Whig or Liberal MP returned for County Kildare. After his retirement in 1880, all further MPs for the county were Irish nationalists of various parties, until and Sinn Féin from 1918 until Irish representation at Westminster ended in 1922 with the foundation of the Irish Free State.

== Arms ==
Coat of arms of William H. F. Cogan
Notes Granted 5 November 1860 by Sir John Berard Burke, Ulster King of Arms. Crest A talbot passant Proper collared and chained Or charged on the shoulder with a cross bottony as in the arms. Escutcheon Azure three oak leaves Argent on a chief Or a cross bottony Gules. Motto Constans Fidei

Parliament of the United Kingdom
Preceded by Lord Naas; Marquess of Kildare	Member of Parliament for County Kildare; 1852–1880; With: Marquess of Kildare to July 1852; David O'Connor Henchy July 1852 – 1859; Richard More O'Ferrall 1859–1865; Lord Otho FitzGerald 1865–1874; Charles Henry Meldon from 1874	Succeeded by Charles Henry Meldon; James Leahy
