= Matthew Minch =

Irish politician

Matthew Joseph Minch (1857 – 5 June 1921) was an brewer and Irish nationalist politician from County Kildare who sat in the United Kingdom House of Commons as member of parliament (MP) for South Kildare from 1892 to 1903.

Minch was first elected at the 1892 general election as an Anti-Parnellite Irish National Federation candidate, unseating the sitting Parnellite MP James Leahy. He was re-elected unopposed in 1895 and also in 1900, on the latter occasion as an Irish Parliamentary Party candidate, since the split in the party had been resolved earlier that year. He resigned his seat on 12 May 1903, by the procedural device of taking the post of Steward of the Manor of Northstead.

Minch was also one of the first councillors elected to Kildare County Council, when it was created in 1899.

Minch was married twice. With his first wife Agnes he had five sons, including:

- John Minch (1890–1942) – an Irish rugby international killed in Second World War serving in the Royal Army Medical Corps.
- Sydney Minch (1893–1970) – a Teachta Dála for Fine Gael in the 1930s.
- William J. Minch (1894/95–1927) – health broken while serving in the Connaught Rangers in the First World War.

With his second wife Elizabeth O'Kelly he had two sons and one daughter.

He died at his residence, Rockfield House, Athy, County Kildare, in 1921.

Parliament of the United Kingdom
Preceded by James Leahy	Member of Parliament for South Kildare; 1892–1903	Succeeded by Denis Kilbride
