= Denis Kilbride =

Denis Kilbride in 1906

Denis Kilbride (September 1848 – 24 October 1924) was an Irish nationalist politician, who as member of the Irish Parliamentary Party represented South Kerry (1887–1895), and North Galway (1895–1900) and South Kildare (1903–1918) as a Member of Parliament (MP) in the House of Commons of the United Kingdom of Great Britain and Ireland.

He was educated at Clongowes Wood. He was evicted, along with other subtenants of the 5th Marquess of Lansdowne, was evicted from his 500-acre (2.0 km^{2}) holding during the Luggacurran evictions, Stradbally, County Laois, in March 1887.

Kilbride's rent was 760 pounds a year, although the holding was valued at only 450. Although he was a large tenant, he and other tenants adopted the Plan of Campaign.

To raise awareness of the evictions, Kilbride travelled with William O'Brien to Canada, where the Marquess of Lansdowne was governor general, and the USA.

In August 1902, he was charged under the Offences against the Person Act 1861 with incitement to murder - during the course of a speech against an eviction - of Major-General Devinish Meares. That December, he was found guilty and sentenced to eight months' imprisonment. After the passing of the Evicted Tenants Act, 1908, some of this holding, but not his house, was returned to him.

He died at his residence in Luggacurran in 1924 aged 76 and was buried in Clopook cemetery.

Parliament of the United Kingdom
Preceded by John O'Connor	Member of Parliament for South Kerry; 1887 – 1895	Succeeded by Thomas Joseph Farrell
Preceded by John Philip Nolan	Member of Parliament for Galway North; 1895 – 1900	Succeeded by John Philip Nolan
Preceded by Matthew Joseph Minch	Member of Parliament for South Kildare; 1903 – 1918	Succeeded by Art O'Connor
