= Robert Archbold =

Irish Whig politician (d. 1855)

Member of Parliament for County Kildare
- In office 11 August 1837 – 18 August 1847 Serving with Richard More O'Ferrall
- Preceded by: Edward Ruthven; Richard More O'Ferrall
- Succeeded by: Charles FitzGerald; Richard Bourke

Personal details
- Died: 26 February 1855
- Party: Whig

Robert Archbold (died 26 February 1855) was an Irish Whig politician.

Archbold was first elected Whig MP for County Kildare at the 1837 general election and held the seat until 1847 when he did not seek re-election.

Parliament of the United Kingdom
Preceded by Edward Ruthven; Richard More O'Ferrall	Member of Parliament for County Kildare; 1837–1847; With: Richard More O'Ferrall	Succeeded by Charles FitzGerald
