= Lord Otho FitzGerald =

British soldier and Liberal politician

The Right Honourable Lord Otho FitzGerald PC
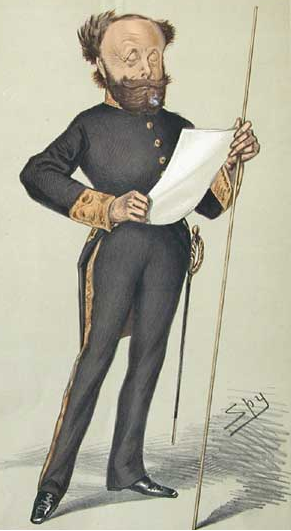
- "A Message from The Queen" – Lord Otho FitzGerald, by Leslie Ward, 1873.

Comptroller of the Household
- In office 12 December 1868 – 17 February 1874
- Monarch: Victoria
- Prime Minister: William Gladstone
- Preceded by: Viscount Royston
- Succeeded by: Lord Henry Somerset

Member of Parliament for County Kildare
- In office 1865–1874 Serving with William H. F. Cogan
- Preceded by: Richard More O'Ferrall; William H. F. Cogan
- Succeeded by: Charles Henry Meldon; William H. F. Cogan

Personal details
- Born: 10 October 1827
- Died: 19 November 1882 (aged 55)
- Party: Liberal
- Spouse(s): Ursula, Lady Londesborough (m. 1861; died 1882)
- Parent(s): Augustus FitzGerald, 3rd Duke of Leinster; Lady Charlotte Augusta Stanhope

Lord Otho Augustus FitzGerald PC (10 October 1827 – 19 November 1882) was a British soldier and Liberal politician. He notably served as Comptroller of the Household under William Gladstone between 1868 and 1874. He was also a noted amateur composer.

== Early life ==
Although the family home of the Duke of Leinster was Carton House near Maynooth, County Kildare (Ireland), FitzGerald was born at Harrington House, Northamptonshire (England), the home of his mother. He was the third son of Augustus FitzGerald, 3rd Duke of Leinster, by his wife Lady Charlotte Augusta Stanhope. Charles FitzGerald, 4th Duke of Leinster, was his elder brother. Another brother, Gerald Fitzgerald (1821–1886) was, like Otho, an amateur composer, photographer and a noted artist. His sister, Lady Jane Seymour FitzGerald, was the wife of George Repton, an MP for St Albans and Warwick. was a British Conservative Party politician

His paternal grandparents were William FitzGerald, 2nd Duke of Leinster and Emilia Olivia St George (a daughter of the 1st Baron St George). His maternal grandparents were General Charles Stanhope, 3rd Earl of Harrington and Jane Fleming (a daughter of Sir John Fleming, 1st Baronet), a lady of the Bedchamber to the Queen Charlotte.

== Career ==
Fitzgerald was an officer in the Royal Horse Guards and served as a Gentleman of the Bedchamber to the Lord-Lieutenant of Ireland. He entered the House of Commons in 1865 as member for County Kildare, a seat he held until 1874. In 1866 he was sworn of the Privy Council and made Treasurer of the Household under Lord Russell, a post he only held until the fall of the Liberal government in June of that year. He returned to office as Comptroller of the Household under William Gladstone in 1868, a post he retained until the government fell in 1874.

=== Musical compositions ===
Fitzgerald probably enjoyed a private musical education. He published piano music in Dublin with Robinson & Bussell (later Henry Bussel). Works include:

- The Spirit of the Ball (c.1850)
- The Irish Steeple Chase Galop (c.1860)
- The Mirage Valses (c.1860)
- The Mistletoe Waltzes (not dated)
- The Staff Polka (not dated)

The composer Oscar Krahmer dedicated his piano work The Garrison Ball Galop (1857) to Otho Fitzgerald.

== Personal life ==
On 14 December 1861 Lord Otho married Ursula Lucy Grace, Lady Londesborough (née Bridgeman), daughter of Vice Admiral Charles Orlando Bridgeman and widow of Lord Londesborough. This was regarded by his contemporaries as a fortune-hunting match. They had two children:

- Gerald Otho FitzGerald (1862–1919), a Major in the King's Royal Rifle Corps who died unmarried and without issue.
- Ina Blanche Georgie FitzGerald (1864–1910), who married Maj. Arthur Leopold Paget, a son of Col. Leopold Grimston Paget (a son of Hon. Berkeley Paget and grandson of the 1st Earl of Uxbridge), in 1885.

Fitzgerald for a while owned Oakley Court on the Thames, at Bray in Berkshire. He died at Bray in November 1882, aged 55. Lady Otho FitzGerald only survived him by a year and died in November 1883. They are buried at St Andrew's Church, Clewer.

Parliament of the United Kingdom
Preceded by Richard More O'Ferrall; William H. F. Cogan	Member of Parliament for County Kildare; 1865–1874; With: William H. F. Cogan	Succeeded by Charles Henry Meldon; William H. F. Cogan
Political offices
Preceded by Viscount Bury	Treasurer of the Household; May–June 1866	Succeeded by Lord Burghley
Preceded by Viscount Royston	Comptroller of the Household; 1868–1874	Succeeded by Lord Henry Somerset
