= Thomas Joseph Farrell =

Thomas Joseph Farrell (1847–1913) was an Irish nationalist politician. He was Member of Parliament (MP) for the Anti-Parnellite Irish National Federation for South Kerry from 1895 to 1900, representing the county in the United Kingdom House of Commons.

Farrell was elected to the Parliament at a by-election on 5 September 1895. The outgoing MP for South Kerry, Denis Kilbride, had been re-elected in South Kerry at the general election in July 1895, but had also been elected for North Galway, and chose to sit for that seat. The only other candidate at the by-election was Bantry-born William Martin Murphy, standing on this occasion as an "independent nationalist". Murphy was a former MP for Dublin St Patrick's, and a wealthy businessman who was the principal backer of the "Healyite" newspapers the National Press and the Daily Nation. Farrell won the seat with a large majority, but did not contest the general election in 1900, when the Irish Parliamentary Party (IPP) reunited and John Pius Boland was returned unopposed as the IPP MP for South Kerry.

Parliament of the United Kingdom
Preceded by Denis Kilbride	Member of Parliament for South Kerry; 1895 – 1900	Succeeded by John Pius Boland
