= Carlow–Kildare =

Dáil constituency (1937–1948)

- Former Dáil constituency
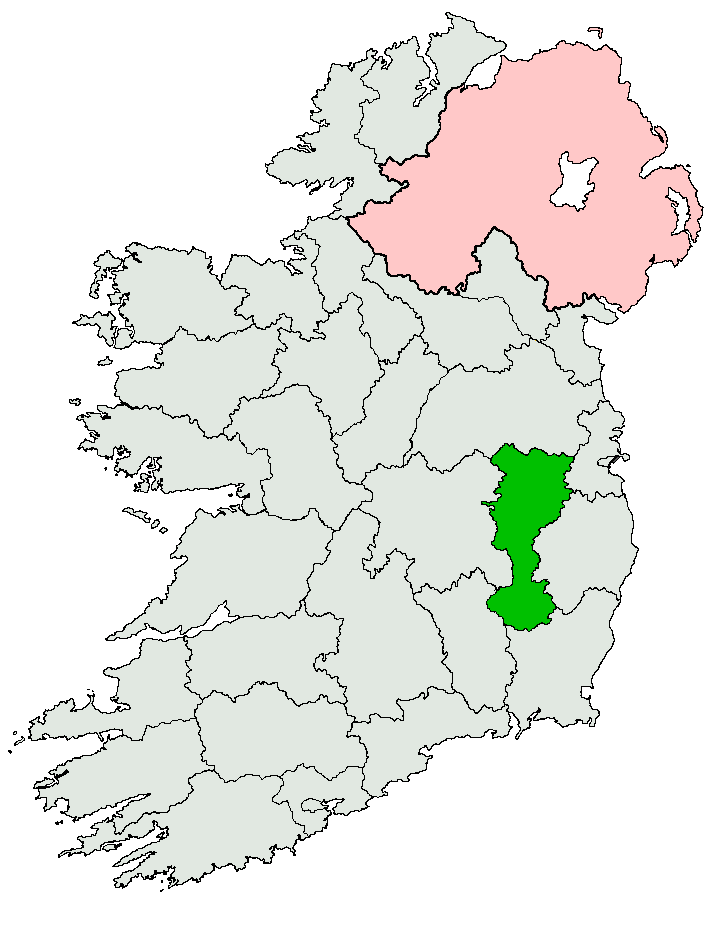
- Location of Carlow–Kildare within Ireland

Former constituency
- Created: 1937
- Abolished: 1948
- Seats: 4
- Local government areas: County Carlow; County Kildare
- Created from: Carlow–Kilkenny; Kildare
- Replaced by: Carlow–Kilkenny; Kildare

Carlow–Kildare was a parliamentary constituency represented in Dáil Éireann, the lower house of the Irish parliament or Oireachtas from 1937 to 1948. The constituency elected 4 deputies (Teachtaí Dála, commonly known as TDs) to the Dáil, on the system of proportional representation by means of the single transferable vote (PR-STV).

== History ==
The constituency was created for the 1937 general election under the Electoral (Revision of Constituencies) Act 1935, replacing the old Carlow–Kilkenny and Kildare constituencies.

Under the Electoral (Amendment) Act 1947, the constituency was abolished, and the Carlow–Kilkenny and Kildare constituencies were re-created for the 1948 general election.

== Boundaries ==
The constituency covered all of County Kildare, and most of County Carlow. Carlow–Kildare's boundaries were defined by the 1935 Act as:

"The administrative County of Kildare.
The administrative County of Carlow except the portion thereof which is comprised in the County Constituencies of Wicklow and Wexford."

The Act defines the parts of Carlow in the Wicklow constituency as:

"The district electoral divisions of:
Clonmore, Hacketstown, Haroldstown, Kineagh, Rahill, Rathvilly, Tiknock and Williamstown in the administrative County of Carlow."

The parts of Carlow in the Wexford constituency are defined as:

"The district electoral divisions of:
Ballyellin, Ballymurphy, Borris, Coonogue, Corries, Glynn, Killedmond, Kyle, Marley, Rathanna, Sliguff and Tinnahinch in the administrative County of Carlow."

== TDs ==
Teachtaí Dála (TDs) for Carlow–Kildare 1937–1948
Key to parties: FF = Fianna Fáil; FG = Fine Gael; Lab = Labour
Dáil	Election	Deputy (Party)	Deputy (Party)	Deputy (Party)	Deputy (Party)
9th	1937	William Norton (Lab)	Thomas Harris (FF)	Francis Humphreys (FF)	Sydney Minch (FG)
10th	1938	William Norton (Lab)	Thomas Harris (FF)	Francis Humphreys (FF)	James Hughes (FG)
11th	1943	William Norton (Lab)	Thomas Harris (FF)	Francis Humphreys (FF)	James Hughes (FG)
12th	1944	William Norton (Lab)	Thomas Harris (FF)	Francis Humphreys (FF)	James Hughes (FG)
13th	1948	Constituency abolished. See Carlow–Kilkenny and Kildare			

Note: The columns in this table are used only for presentational purposes, and no significance should be attached to the order of columns. For details of the order in which seats were won at each election, see the detailed results of that election.

== Elections ==
*: Outgoing TD

=== 1944 general election ===
1944 general election: Carlow–Kildare
Party	Candidate	FPv%	Count			
Party	Candidate	FPv%	1	2	3	4
Fianna Fáil	Thomas Harris	26.3	8,797			
Fine Gael	James Hughes	19.8	6,638	6,750		
Labour	William Norton	18.3	6,142	6,287	6,429	6,598
Fianna Fáil	Francis Humphreys	13.0	4,357	5,433	7,627	
Labour	Thomas Hayden	9.2	3,096	3,200	3,238	3,444
Fine Gael	Patrick Frayne	7.8	2,598	2,633	2,660	2,707
Fianna Fáil	Thomas Mullins	5.6	1,875	2,499		
Electorate: 51,949 Valid: 33,503 Quota: 6,701 Turnout: 64.5%

=== 1943 general election ===
1943 general election: Carlow–Kildare
Party	Candidate	FPv%	Count						
Party	Candidate	FPv%	1	2	3	4	5	6	7
Labour	William Norton	22.5	8,355						
Fianna Fáil	Thomas Harris	22.2	8,229						
Fine Gael	James Hughes	16.5	6,107	6,142	6,175	6,214	8,487		
Fianna Fáil	Francis Humphreys	10.2	3,804	3,836	4,323	5,354	5,408	5,445	6,053
Labour	Thomas Hayden	9.6	3,571	4,279	4,347	4,398	4,524	4,661	5,328
Independent	Thomas Lawlor	8.1	3,007	3,077	3,124	3,196	3,562	4,452	
Fine Gael	Gerard Sweetman	7.9	2,924	2,981	2,992	3,016			
Fianna Fáil	Thomas Mullins	3.0	1,117	1,147	1,307				
Electorate: 51,949 Valid: 37,114 Quota: 7,423 Turnout: 71.4%

=== 1938 general election ===
1938 general election: Carlow–Kildare
Party	Candidate	FPv%	Count				
Party	Candidate	FPv%	1	2	3	4	5
Fianna Fáil	Thomas Harris	22.0	7,874				
Labour	William Norton	20.8	7,467				
Fine Gael	James Hughes	17.0	6,104	6,223	6,692	6,769	6,837
Fine Gael	Sydney Minch	16.0	5,749	6,033	6,272	6,496	6,633
Fianna Fáil	Francis Humphreys	15.8	5,645	7,860			
Fianna Fáil	William Tynan	8.3	2,988				
Electorate: 48,552 Valid: 35,827 Quota: 7,166 Turnout: 73.8%

=== 1937 general election ===
1937 general election: Carlow–Kildare
Party	Candidate	FPv%	Count					
Party	Candidate	FPv%	1	2	3	4	5	6
Labour	William Norton	26.0	9,427					
Fine Gael	Sydney Minch	16.5	5,957	6,413	7,901			
Fianna Fáil	Francis Humphreys	15.2	5,515	5,952	6,087	6,105	6,839	8,816
Fianna Fáil	Thomas Harris	14.3	5,163	5,570	5,661	5,663	9,237	
Fianna Fáil	Brigid Darby	11.1	4,021	4,691	4,799	4,803		
Fine Gael	Gerard Sweetman	8.5	3,073	3,215	4,330	4,967	5,049	5,069
Fine Gael	Patrick Nolan	8.4	3,041	3,116				
Electorate: 48,536 Valid: 36,197 Quota: 7,240 Turnout: 74.6%

== See also ==
- Dáil constituencies
- Politics of the Republic of Ireland
- Historic Dáil constituencies
- Elections in the Republic of Ireland
