= 1903 South Kildare by-election =

UK parliamentary by-election

The 1903 South Kildare by-election was held on 23 May 1903, after the seat was vacated when incumbent Irish Parliamentary Party MP Matthew Minch resigned. The by-election was won by the IPP candidate Denis Kilbride, who stood unopposed. Kilbride, who had been convicted of Incitement to Murder in December 1902, was serving a sentence in Mountjoy Prison. He was invited to stand as a candidate by the local United Irish League as a protest at perceived jury packing.
