= Francis Humphreys =

Irish politician (1891–1961)

Teachta Dála
- In office March 1957 – 19 April 1961
- In office May 1951 – May 1954
- Constituency: Carlow–Kilkenny
- In office July 1937 – February 1948
- Constituency: Carlow–Kildare
- In office February 1932 – January 1933
- Constituency: Carlow–Kilkenny

Personal details
- Born: 28 July 1891 Cork, Ireland
- Died: 19 April 1961 (aged 69) Dublin, Ireland
- Party: Fianna Fáil
- Education: Royal College of Surgeons

Francis Humphreys (28 July 1891 – 19 April 1961) was an Irish Fianna Fáil politician who served as a Teachta Dála (TD) for the Carlow–Kilkenny constituency from 1932 to 1933, for Carlow–Kildare from 1937 to 1948, and for Carlow–Kilkenny again 1951 to 1954 and 1957 to 1961.

A medical practitioner before entering politics, Humphreys was elected to Dáil Éireann on his first attempt, at the 1932 general election for the Carlow–Kilkenny constituency. He lost his seat at the 1933 election, but in 1937, he was returned to the 9th Dáil as the last of four candidates to be elected in the new Carlow–Kildare constituency at the 1937 general election.

Humphreys was re-elected at three further general elections, in 1938, 1943 and 1944. After further constituency changes he was defeated again at the 1948 general election in the restored Carlow–Kilkenny constituency. At the 1951 election, he was returned to the 14th Dáil, unseating the Labour Party's James Pattison. He lost again to Pattison at the 1954 election, before ousting Pattison again at the 1957 general election.

He died on 19 April 1961, before completing his seventh term in Dáil Éireann. No by-election was held for his seat in the 16th Dáil, which remained vacant until the 1961 general election on 4 October, when he was replaced by Labour's Séamus Pattison, son of his rival James Pattison.

| Dáil | Election | Deputy (Party) | Deputy (Party) | Deputy (Party) | Deputy (Party) |
|---|---|---|---|---|---|
| 9th | 1937 | William Norton (Lab) | Thomas Harris (FF) | Francis Humphreys (FF) | Sydney Minch (FG) |
| 10th | 1938 | William Norton (Lab) | Thomas Harris (FF) | Francis Humphreys (FF) | James Hughes (FG) |
| 11th | 1943 | William Norton (Lab) | Thomas Harris (FF) | Francis Humphreys (FF) | James Hughes (FG) |
| 12th | 1944 | William Norton (Lab) | Thomas Harris (FF) | Francis Humphreys (FF) | James Hughes (FG) |
| 13th | 1948 | Constituency abolished. See Carlow–Kilkenny and Kildare | | | |

| Dáil | Election | Deputy (Party) | Deputy (Party) | Deputy (Party) | Deputy (Party) | Deputy (Party) |
|---|---|---|---|---|---|---|
| 2nd | 1921 | Edward Aylward (SF) | W. T. Cosgrave (SF) | James Lennon (SF) | Gearóid O'Sullivan (SF) | 4 seats 1921–1923 |
| 3rd | 1922 | Patrick Gaffney (Lab) | W. T. Cosgrave (PT-SF) | Denis Gorey (FP) | Gearóid O'Sullivan (PT-SF) | 4 seats 1921–1923 |
| 4th | 1923 | Edward Doyle (Lab) | W. T. Cosgrave (CnaG) | Denis Gorey (FP) | Michael Shelly (Rep) | Seán Gibbons (CnaG) |
| 4th | 1925 by-election | Edward Doyle (Lab) | W. T. Cosgrave (CnaG) | Denis Gorey (FP) | Michael Shelly (Rep) | Thomas Bolger (CnaG) |
| 5th | 1927 (Jun) | Edward Doyle (Lab) | W. T. Cosgrave (CnaG) | Denis Gorey (CnaG) | Thomas Derrig (FF) | Richard Holohan (FP) |
| 6th | 1927 (Sep) | Edward Doyle (Lab) | W. T. Cosgrave (CnaG) | Peter de Loughry (CnaG) | Thomas Derrig (FF) | Richard Holohan (FP) |
| 6th | 1927 by-election | Edward Doyle (Lab) | Denis Gorey (CnaG) | Peter de Loughry (CnaG) | Thomas Derrig (FF) | Richard Holohan (FP) |
| 7th | 1932 | Francis Humphreys (FF) | Denis Gorey (CnaG) | Desmond FitzGerald (CnaG) | Thomas Derrig (FF) | Seán Gibbons (FF) |
| 8th | 1933 | James Pattison (Lab) | Richard Holohan (NCP) | Desmond FitzGerald (CnaG) | Thomas Derrig (FF) | Seán Gibbons (FF) |
| 9th | 1937 | Constituency abolished. See Kilkenny and Carlow–Kildare | | | | |

| Dáil | Election | Deputy (Party) | Deputy (Party) | Deputy (Party) | Deputy (Party) | Deputy (Party) |
|---|---|---|---|---|---|---|
| 13th | 1948 | James Pattison (NLP) | Thomas Walsh (FF) | Thomas Derrig (FF) | Joseph Hughes (FG) | Patrick Crotty (FG) |
| 14th | 1951 | Francis Humphreys (FF) | Thomas Walsh (FF) | Thomas Derrig (FF) | Joseph Hughes (FG) | Patrick Crotty (FG) |
| 15th | 1954 | James Pattison (Lab) | Thomas Walsh (FF) | Thomas Derrig (FF) | Joseph Hughes (FG) | Patrick Crotty (FG) |
| 15th | 1956 by-election | James Pattison (Lab) | Martin Medlar (FF) | Thomas Derrig (FF) | Joseph Hughes (FG) | Patrick Crotty (FG) |
| 16th | 1957 | Francis Humphreys (FF) | Martin Medlar (FF) | Jim Gibbons (FF) | Joseph Hughes (FG) | Patrick Crotty (FG) |
| 16th | 1960 by-election | Patrick Teehan (FF) | Martin Medlar (FF) | Jim Gibbons (FF) | Joseph Hughes (FG) | Patrick Crotty (FG) |
| 17th | 1961 | Séamus Pattison (Lab) | Martin Medlar (FF) | Jim Gibbons (FF) | Desmond Governey (FG) | Patrick Crotty (FG) |
| 18th | 1965 | Séamus Pattison (Lab) | Tom Nolan (FF) | Jim Gibbons (FF) | Desmond Governey (FG) | Patrick Crotty (FG) |
| 19th | 1969 | Séamus Pattison (Lab) | Tom Nolan (FF) | Jim Gibbons (FF) | Desmond Governey (FG) | Kieran Crotty (FG) |
| 20th | 1973 | Séamus Pattison (Lab) | Tom Nolan (FF) | Jim Gibbons (FF) | Desmond Governey (FG) | Kieran Crotty (FG) |
| 21st | 1977 | Séamus Pattison (Lab) | Tom Nolan (FF) | Jim Gibbons (FF) | Liam Aylward (FF) | Kieran Crotty (FG) |
| 22nd | 1981 | Séamus Pattison (Lab) | Tom Nolan (FF) | Desmond Governey (FG) | Liam Aylward (FF) | Kieran Crotty (FG) |
| 23rd | 1982 (Feb) | Séamus Pattison (Lab) | Jim Gibbons (FF) | Desmond Governey (FG) | Liam Aylward (FF) | Kieran Crotty (FG) |
| 24th | 1982 (Nov) | Séamus Pattison (Lab) | M. J. Nolan (FF) | Dick Dowling (FG) | Liam Aylward (FF) | Kieran Crotty (FG) |
| 25th | 1987 | Séamus Pattison (Lab) | M. J. Nolan (FF) | Martin Gibbons (PDs) | Liam Aylward (FF) | Kieran Crotty (FG) |
| 26th | 1989 | Séamus Pattison (Lab) | M. J. Nolan (FF) | Phil Hogan (FG) | Liam Aylward (FF) | John Browne (FG) |
| 27th | 1992 | Séamus Pattison (Lab) | M. J. Nolan (FF) | Phil Hogan (FG) | Liam Aylward (FF) | John Browne (FG) |
| 28th | 1997 | Séamus Pattison (Lab) | John McGuinness (FF) | Phil Hogan (FG) | Liam Aylward (FF) | John Browne (FG) |
| 29th | 2002 | Séamus Pattison (Lab) | John McGuinness (FF) | Phil Hogan (FG) | Liam Aylward (FF) | M. J. Nolan (FF) |
| 30th | 2007 | Mary White (GP) | John McGuinness (FF) | Phil Hogan (FG) | Bobby Aylward (FF) | M. J. Nolan (FF) |
| 31st | 2011 | Ann Phelan (Lab) | John McGuinness (FF) | Phil Hogan (FG) | John Paul Phelan (FG) | Pat Deering (FG) |
| 31st | 2015 by-election | Ann Phelan (Lab) | John McGuinness (FF) | Bobby Aylward (FF) | John Paul Phelan (FG) | Pat Deering (FG) |
| 32nd | 2016 | Kathleen Funchion (SF) | John McGuinness (FF) | Bobby Aylward (FF) | John Paul Phelan (FG) | Pat Deering (FG) |
| 33rd | 2020 | Kathleen Funchion (SF) | John McGuinness (FF) | Jennifer Murnane O'Connor (FF) | John Paul Phelan (FG) | Malcolm Noonan (GP) |
| 34th | 2024 | Natasha Newsome Drennan (SF) | John McGuinness (FF) | Jennifer Murnane O'Connor (FF) | Catherine Callaghan (FG) | Peter "Chap" Cleere (FF) |
