= Balyna House =

Italianate country house in County Kildare, Ireland

- Teach Baile an Fhea
- Interactive map of the Balyna House area

General information
- Architectural style: Italianate
- Location: Balyna Estate, Moyvalley, County Kildare, Ireland, Ireland
- Coordinates: 53.41876°N 6.92094°W
- Completed: 1882; 144 years ago

Technical details
- Material: limestone

Design and construction
- Architect: William Henry Byrne

Balyna House is a late-19th-century Italianate country house on the Balyna Estate near Johnstownbridge, County Kildare, Ireland.

== History ==
Queen Elizabeth I granted Balyna Estate to the O'Moore family, who had lost their lands in Laois.

Due to the O'Moore family's staunch Catholicism, the estate became a refuge for many priests and bishops for centuries, and priests were ordained there in the years 1678–1680 by Dr. Richard Forstall, bishop of Kildare. Papal permission was granted to the family to erect a small chapel on the grounds as a reward for their loyalty, and Sunday mass was celebrated there up until 1914.

The first record of any house on the estate dates back to 1815, when Major Ambrose O'Ferrall built a large mansion. This burned down in 1878 and the present Italianate mansion, designed by William Henry Byrne, was built on the existing vaulted basement of the older house.

The son of Major Ambrose O'Ferrall and Letitia More, Richard More O'Ferrall, a British MP and later governor of Malta, was born on Balyna Estate.

Douglas Hyde often took part in shooting parties on the estate in his time as president of Ireland, as did the historian Eoin "Pope" O'Mahony.

The house and estate remained in the More O'Ferrall family until 1960, when it was sold to the Bewley family of Bewley's Cafe, who ran a dairy Jersey herd on the farm. It was later sold to Justin Keating TD in 1984 and has since been sold a number of times in recent years.

The estate was redeveloped in 2006 into a hotel and golf course and is now called Moyvalley Hotel.
