= Charles Henry Meldon =

Irish barrister and politician

Charles Henry Meldon, LL.D., QC (1841 – 15 May 1892) was an Irish barrister and nationalist politician who took his seat in the United Kingdom House of Commons as Member of Parliament (MP) for County Kildare from 1874 to 1885.

== Career ==
A Dublin-based barrister with an address in Rutland Square (now Parnell Square), Meldon was a Queen's Counsel and a justice of the peace for counties Dublin, Kildare, Meath, and Westmeath. He was a member of the Royal Commission established in 1878 to enquire into the Registration of Deeds, which reported in 1879 and 1880.

He was first elected to Parliament at the 1874 general election, as a Home Rule League candidate, when he defeated the sitting Liberal MP Lord Otho FitzGerald. He was re-elected as a Home Ruler in 1880, and joined the new Irish Parliamentary Party (IPP) when it was created in 1882. When the Kildare constituency was divided at the 1885 general election, he did not stand for re-election.

== Arms ==
Coat of arms of Charles Henry Meldon

Notes
Confirmed 6 February 1875 by Sir John Bernard Burke, Ulster King of Arms.
Crest
A dexter hand Proper surmounted by a crescent Or therefrom issuant an etoile Argent.
Escutcheon
Vert a dexter hand couped Argent between three crescents Or issuant therefrom as many estoiled of the second.
Motto
Pro Fide Et Patria

Parliament of the United Kingdom
Preceded by Lord Otho FitzGerald; William H. F. Cogan	Member of Parliament for County Kildare; 1874 – 1885; With: William H. F. Cogan to 1880; James Leahy from 1880	Constituency divided
