= Thomas Hayden (Irish politician) =

Irish politician

Senator
- In office 8 September 1943 – 21 April 1948
- Constituency: Labour Panel

Personal details
- Party: Labour

Thomas Hayden was an Irish politician. A member of the Labour Party, he was elected to the 4th Seanad Éireann in 1943 by the Labour Panel, and was re-elected at the 1944 Seanad election. He did not contest the 1948 election.

Hayden was an agricultural labourer. He was an unsuccessful Labour Party candidate for the Carlow–Kildare constituency at the 1943 and 1944 general elections, and also unsuccessfully contested the Carlow–Kilkenny constituency at the 1951 general election.
