= John O'Connor (Irish Parliamentary Party politician) =

Irish nationalist politician (1835–1891)

Member of Parliament for South Kerry
- In office 1885–1887
- Preceded by: New constituency
- Succeeded by: Denis Kilbride

Lord Mayor of Dublin
- In office 1885–1886
- Preceded by: William Meagher
- Succeeded by: Timothy Daniel Sullivan

Personal details
- Born: c.1835
- Died: 12 January 1891 (aged 55–56)
- Party: Irish Parliamentary Party

John O'Connor (c. 1835 – 12 January 1891) was an Irish nationalist politician who was elected in 1885 as Lord Mayor of Dublin and also as a Member of Parliament (MP) for South Kerry.

O'Connor was the son of a farmer at Staplestown, County Kildare, and owned several public houses. He married the daughter of a pawnbroker, a Mr White. He was an alderman of Dublin Corporation and Lord Mayor in 1885.

At the general election in December 1885 he won the newly created South Kerry constituency for the Irish Parliamentary Party by more than 20 to 1 over the "Loyalist" candidate, taking his seat in the House of Commons of the United Kingdom of Great Britain and Ireland. O'Connor was re-elected unopposed in 1886, but resigned his seat in September 1887.

== Sources ==
- The Times (London), 1 December 1885
- Brian M. Walker (ed.), Parliamentary Election Results in Ireland, 1801-1922, Dublin, Royal Irish Academy, 1978

Parliament of the United Kingdom
New constituency	Member of Parliament for South Kerry; 1885–1887	Succeeded by Denis Kilbride
Civic offices
Preceded by William Meagher	Lord Mayor of Dublin; 1885–1886	Succeeded by Timothy Daniel Sullivan
