= South Kerry (UK Parliament constituency) =

Former parliamentary constituency in the United Kingdom

- Former county constituency for the House of Commons

1885–1922
- Seats: 1
- Created from: County Kerry
- Replaced by: Kerry–Limerick West

South Kerry was a UK Parliament constituency in Ireland, returning one Member of Parliament between 1885 and 1922.

Prior to the 1885 general election, the area was part of the County Kerry constituency. Representation at Westminster in this constituency ceased at the 1922 United Kingdom general election, which took place on 15 November, shortly before the establishment of the Irish Free State on 6 December 1922. The successor constituency in the new Dáil Éireann was Kerry–Limerick West, first established under the Government of Ireland Act 1920 to elect members to the House of Commons of Southern Ireland in 1921.

== Boundaries ==
This constituency comprised the southern part of County Kerry.

1885–1922: The baronies of Dunkerron North, Dunkerron South, Glanarought and Iveragh.

== Members of Parliament ==
Election	Member	Party
1885	John O'Connor	Irish Parliamentary Party
1887 by-election	Denis Kilbride	Irish Parliamentary Party
1891	Denis Kilbride	Irish National Federation
1895	Denis Kilbride	Irish National Federation
1895 by-election	Thomas Joseph Farrell	Irish National Federation
1900	John Pius Boland	Irish Parliamentary Party
1918	Fionán Lynch	Sinn Féin
1922	constituency abolished	

== Elections ==
=== Elections in the 1880s ===
1885 general election: South Kerry
Party	Candidate	Votes	%	±%
Irish Parliamentary	John O'Connor	2,742	95.4	
Irish Loyal and Patriotic Union	Daniel O'Connell	133	4.6	
Majority		2,609	90.8	
Turnout		2,875	63.5	
Registered electors		4,529		
Irish Parliamentary win (new seat)				

1886 general election: South Kerry
Party	Candidate	Votes	%	±%
Irish Parliamentary	John O'Connor	Unopposed		
Irish Parliamentary hold				

By-election, 1887: South Kerry
Party	Candidate	Votes	%	±%
Irish Parliamentary	Denis Kilbride	Unopposed		
Irish Parliamentary hold				

=== Elections in the 1890s ===
1892 general election: South Kerry
Party	Candidate	Votes	%	±%
Irish National Federation	Denis Kilbride	2,096	87.1	N/A
Irish National League	James Foley	225	9.3	N/A
Irish Unionist	Rowland George Allanson-Winn	86	3.6	New
Majority		1,871	77.8	N/A
Turnout		2,407	65.3	N/A
Registered electors		3,686		
Irish National Federation gain from Irish Parliamentary		Swing	N/A	

1895 general election: South Kerry
Party	Candidate	Votes	%	±%
Irish National Federation	Denis Kilbride	Unopposed		
Irish National Federation hold				

Kilbride is also elected MP for Galway North and elects to sit there, prompting a by-election.

By-election, 1895: South Kerry
Party	Candidate	Votes	%	±%
Irish National Federation	Thomas Joseph Farrell	1,209	71.8	N/A
Ind. Nationalist	William Martin Murphy	474	28.2	New
Majority		735	43.6	N/A
Turnout		1,683	48.5	N/A
Registered electors		3,472		
Irish National Federation hold		Swing	N/A	

=== Elections in the 1900s ===
1900 general election: South Kerry
Party	Candidate	Votes	%	±%
Irish Parliamentary	John Pius Boland	Unopposed		
Irish Parliamentary hold				

1906 general election: South Kerry
Party	Candidate	Votes	%	±%
Irish Parliamentary	John Pius Boland	Unopposed		
Irish Parliamentary hold				

=== Elections in the 1910s ===
January 1910 general election: South Kerry
Party	Candidate	Votes	%	±%
Irish Parliamentary	John Pius Boland	Unopposed		
Irish Parliamentary hold				

December 1910 general election: South Kerry
Party	Candidate	Votes	%	±%
Irish Parliamentary	John Pius Boland	2,390	84.1	N/A
All-for-Ireland	Timothy Brendan Cronin	452	15.9	New
Majority		1,938	68.2	N/A
Turnout		2,842	48.5	N/A
Registered electors		5,858		
Irish Parliamentary hold		Swing	N/A	

1918 general election: South Kerry
Party	Candidate	Votes	%	±%
Sinn Féin	Fionán Lynch	Unopposed		
Sinn Féin gain from Irish Parliamentary				
