= List of Irish poor law unions =

This article lists all poor law unions in Ireland.

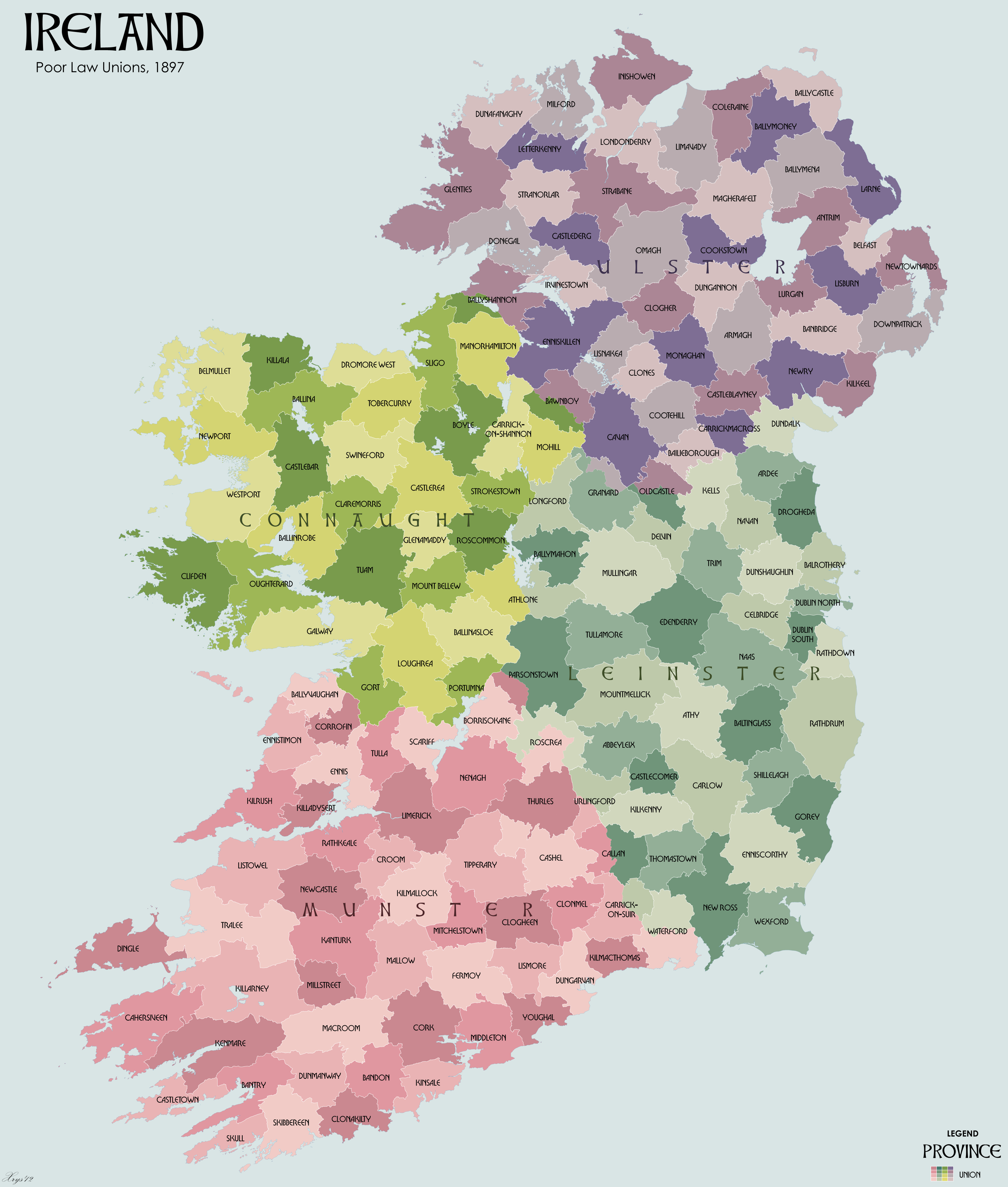
Map of poor law unions in 1897

== Antrim ==
Antrim, Ballycastle, Ballymena, Ballymoney, Belfast, Larne, Lisburn

== Armagh ==
Armagh, Lurgan, Newry

== Carlow ==
Carlow, Bawnboy

== Cavan ==
Bailieborough, Bawnboy, Cavan, Cootehill

== Clare ==
Ballyvaughan, Corofin, Ennis, Ennistymon, Kildysart (Killadysert), Kilrush, Scariff, Tulla

== Cork ==
Bandon, Bantry, Castletownbere, Clonakilty, Cork, Dunmanway, Fermoy, Kanturk, Kilmallock, Kinsale, Macroom, Mallow, Midleton, Millstreet, Mitchelstown, Skibbereen, Blackpool, Carrigtwohill, Wilton,

== Donegal ==
Ballyshannon, Donegal, Dunfanaghy, Glenties, Inishowen, Letterkenny, Milford, Stranorlar

== Down ==
Banbridge, Downpatrick, Kilkeel, Newry, Newtownards

== Dublin ==
Balrothery, Dublin North, Dublin South, Rathdown

== Fermanagh ==
Enniskillen, Lisnaskea, Irvinestown

== Galway ==
Ballinasloe, Clifden, Galway, Glenamaddy, Gort, Loughrea, Mountbellew, Oughterard, Portumna, Tuam

== Kerry ==
Cahirciveen, Dingle, Kenmare, Killarney, Listowel, Tralee

== Kildare ==
Athy, Celbridge, Naas

== Kilkenny ==
Callan, Castlecomer, Kilkenny, Thomastown, Urlingford

== Laois ==
Abbeyleix, Donaghmore, Mountmellick

== Leitrim ==
Carrick-on-Shannon, Manorhamilton, Mohill

== Limerick ==
Croom, Glin, Kilmallock, Limerick, Newcastle, Rathkeale

== Londonderry ==
Coleraine, Derry Workhouse, Magherafelt, Newtown Limavady

== Longford ==
Ballymahon, Granard, Longford

== Louth ==
Ardee, Drogheda, Dundalk

== Mayo ==
Ballina, Ballinrobe, Belmullet, Castlebar, Claremorris, Killala, Newport, Swinford, Westport

== Meath ==
Castletowndevlin, Dunshaughlin, Kells, Navan, Oldcastle, Trim

== Monaghan ==
Carrickmacross, Castleblaney, Clones, Monaghan

== Offaly ==
Edenderry, Parsonstown, Tullamore

== Roscommon ==
Boyle, Castlerea, Roscommon, Strokestown

== Sligo ==
Dromore West, Sligo, Tubbercurry

== Tipperary ==
Borrisokane, Carrick-on-Suir, Cashel, Clogheen, Clonmel, Nenagh, Roscrea, Thurles, Tipperary

== Tyrone ==
Castlederg, Clogher, Cookstown, Dungannon, Gortin, Omagh, Strabane

== Waterford ==
Dungarvan, Kilmacthomas, Lismore, Waterford

== Westmeath ==
Athlone, Mullingar

== Wexford ==
Enniscorthy, Gorey, New Ross, Wexford

== Wicklow ==
Baltinglass, Rathdrum, Shillelagh
