= Sydney Minch =

Irish politician (1893–1970)

Teachta Dála
- In office July 1937 – June 1938
- Constituency: Carlow–Kildare
- In office February 1932 – July 1937
- Constituency: Kildare

Personal details
- Born: 14 June 1893 Athy, County Kildare, Ireland
- Died: 25 March 1970 (aged 76) County Kildare, Ireland
- Party: Fine Gael
- Other political affiliations: Cumann na nGaedheal
- Spouse: Cynthia Balfe
- Children: 5
- Parent: Matthew Minch (father)
- Education: Belvedere College; Clongowes Wood College

Military service
- Branch/service: British Army
- Rank: Captain
- Unit: 16th (Irish) Division
- Battles/wars: World War I: Third Battle of Ypres

Sydney Basil Minch (14 June 1893 – 25 March 1970) was an Irish politician, army officer and brewer.

He was born on 14 June 1893 in Rockfield, Athy, County Kildare, one of five sons of Matthew Minch, nationalist and anti-Parnellite MP for Kildare South, and Agnes Minch (née Hayden).

He was educated at the Dominican convent, Wicklow; Belvedere College, Dublin and Clongowes Wood College. He fought with the 16th (Irish) Division at the Third Battle of Ypres during World War I, achieving the rank of captain.

He was first elected to Dáil Éireann as a Cumann na nGaedheal Teachta Dála (TD) for the Kildare constituency at the 1932 general election. He was re-elected at the 1933 general election. At the 1937 general election, he was elected as a Fine Gael TD for the Carlow–Kildare constituency. He lost his seat at the 1938 general election. A prominent figure in the Blueshirts, he was the first TD to wear a symbolic blue shirt in Dáil Éireann on 27 September 1933, but was opposed to the fascistic tendencies of the organisation.

On leaving politics he became a director of the family malt firm, Minch, Norton & Co.

Dáil	Election	Deputy (Party)	Deputy (Party)	Deputy (Party)
4th	1923	Hugh Colohan (Lab)	John Conlan (FP)	George Wolfe (CnaG)
5th	1927 (Jun)	Hugh Colohan (Lab)	Domhnall Ua Buachalla (FF)	George Wolfe (CnaG)
6th	1927 (Sep)	Hugh Colohan (Lab)	Domhnall Ua Buachalla (FF)	George Wolfe (CnaG)
6th	1931 by-election	Thomas Harris (FF)	Domhnall Ua Buachalla (FF)	George Wolfe (CnaG)
7th	1932	Thomas Harris (FF)	William Norton (Lab)	Sydney Minch (CnaG)
8th	1933	Thomas Harris (FF)	William Norton (Lab)	Sydney Minch (CnaG)
9th	1937	Constituency abolished. See Carlow–Kildare		

Dáil	Election	Deputy (Party)	Deputy (Party)	Deputy (Party)	Deputy (Party)	Deputy (Party)
13th	1948	William Norton (Lab)	Thomas Harris (FF)	Gerard Sweetman (FG)	3 seats until 1961	3 seats until 1961
14th	1951	William Norton (Lab)	Thomas Harris (FF)	Gerard Sweetman (FG)	3 seats until 1961	3 seats until 1961
15th	1954	William Norton (Lab)	Thomas Harris (FF)	Gerard Sweetman (FG)	3 seats until 1961	3 seats until 1961
16th	1957	William Norton (Lab)	Patrick Dooley (FF)	Gerard Sweetman (FG)	3 seats until 1961	3 seats until 1961
17th	1961	William Norton (Lab)	Patrick Dooley (FF)	Gerard Sweetman (FG)	Brendan Crinion (FF)	4 seats 1961–1969
17th	1964 by-election	Terence Boylan (FF)	Patrick Dooley (FF)	Gerard Sweetman (FG)	Brendan Crinion (FF)	4 seats 1961–1969
18th	1965	Terence Boylan (FF)	Patrick Norton (Lab)	Gerard Sweetman (FG)	Brendan Crinion (FF)	4 seats 1961–1969
19th	1969	Terence Boylan (FF)	Paddy Power (FF)	Gerard Sweetman (FG)	3 seats 1969–1981	3 seats 1969–1981
19th	1970 by-election	Terence Boylan (FF)	Paddy Power (FF)	Patrick Malone (FG)	3 seats 1969–1981	3 seats 1969–1981
20th	1973	Joseph Bermingham (Lab)	Paddy Power (FF)	Patrick Malone (FG)	3 seats 1969–1981	3 seats 1969–1981
21st	1977	Joseph Bermingham (Lab)	Paddy Power (FF)	Charlie McCreevy (FF)	3 seats 1969–1981	3 seats 1969–1981
22nd	1981	Joseph Bermingham (Lab)	Paddy Power (FF)	Charlie McCreevy (FF)	Bernard Durkan (FG)	Alan Dukes (FG)
23rd	1982 (Feb)	Joseph Bermingham (Lab)	Paddy Power (FF)	Charlie McCreevy (FF)	Gerry Brady (FF)	Alan Dukes (FG)
24th	1982 (Nov)	Joseph Bermingham (Lab)	Paddy Power (FF)	Charlie McCreevy (FF)	Bernard Durkan (FG)	Alan Dukes (FG)
25th	1987	Emmet Stagg (Lab)	Paddy Power (FF)	Charlie McCreevy (FF)	Bernard Durkan (FG)	Alan Dukes (FG)
26th	1989	Emmet Stagg (Lab)	Seán Power (FF)	Charlie McCreevy (FF)	Bernard Durkan (FG)	Alan Dukes (FG)
27th	1992	Emmet Stagg (Lab)	Seán Power (FF)	Charlie McCreevy (FF)	Bernard Durkan (FG)	Alan Dukes (FG)
28th	1997	Constituency abolished. See Kildare North and Kildare South				

Dáil	Election	Deputy (Party)	Deputy (Party)	Deputy (Party)	Deputy (Party)
9th	1937	William Norton (Lab)	Thomas Harris (FF)	Francis Humphreys (FF)	Sydney Minch (FG)
10th	1938	William Norton (Lab)	Thomas Harris (FF)	Francis Humphreys (FF)	James Hughes (FG)
11th	1943	William Norton (Lab)	Thomas Harris (FF)	Francis Humphreys (FF)	James Hughes (FG)
12th	1944	William Norton (Lab)	Thomas Harris (FF)	Francis Humphreys (FF)	James Hughes (FG)
13th	1948	Constituency abolished. See Carlow–Kilkenny and Kildare			
