= Derry Workhouse =

Workhouse in Derry, Northern Ireland

Coordinates: 54.995°N 7.306°W

Derry Workhouse was a workhouse in Derry, Northern Ireland. Located in the Waterside area of the city, the workhouse operated from 1840 to 1948.

== History ==
As a result of the Poor Relief (Ireland) Act 1838 (1 & 2 Vict. c. 56), a workhouse with a capacity for 800 people opened in the city on 10 November 1840 and was the first operational workhouse in Ulster. During the Irish Famine (1845-1849), the number of people who were poverty-stricken drastically increased and, like many other workhouses in Ireland at the time, the workhouse experienced severe overcrowding. With the introduction of the National Assistance Act 1948 and the welfare state, the workhouse closed in 1948.

The buildings housed the Waterside hospital until 1991, then were redeveloped as private housing, with the main dormitory area used as a library and museum. During the redevelopment, numerous human remains were found. These remains, believed to be of people who died in the mid-nineteenth century, were later interred in the local Ballyoan cemetery.

The museum opened in 1997. In 2014, the Derry City Council decided to close the museum citing health and safety issues, and decreasing visitor numbers. The council planned to turn the space into apartments.
