= Charles FitzGerald, 4th Duke of Leinster =

Anglo-Irish peer and politician

His Grace The Duke of Leinster
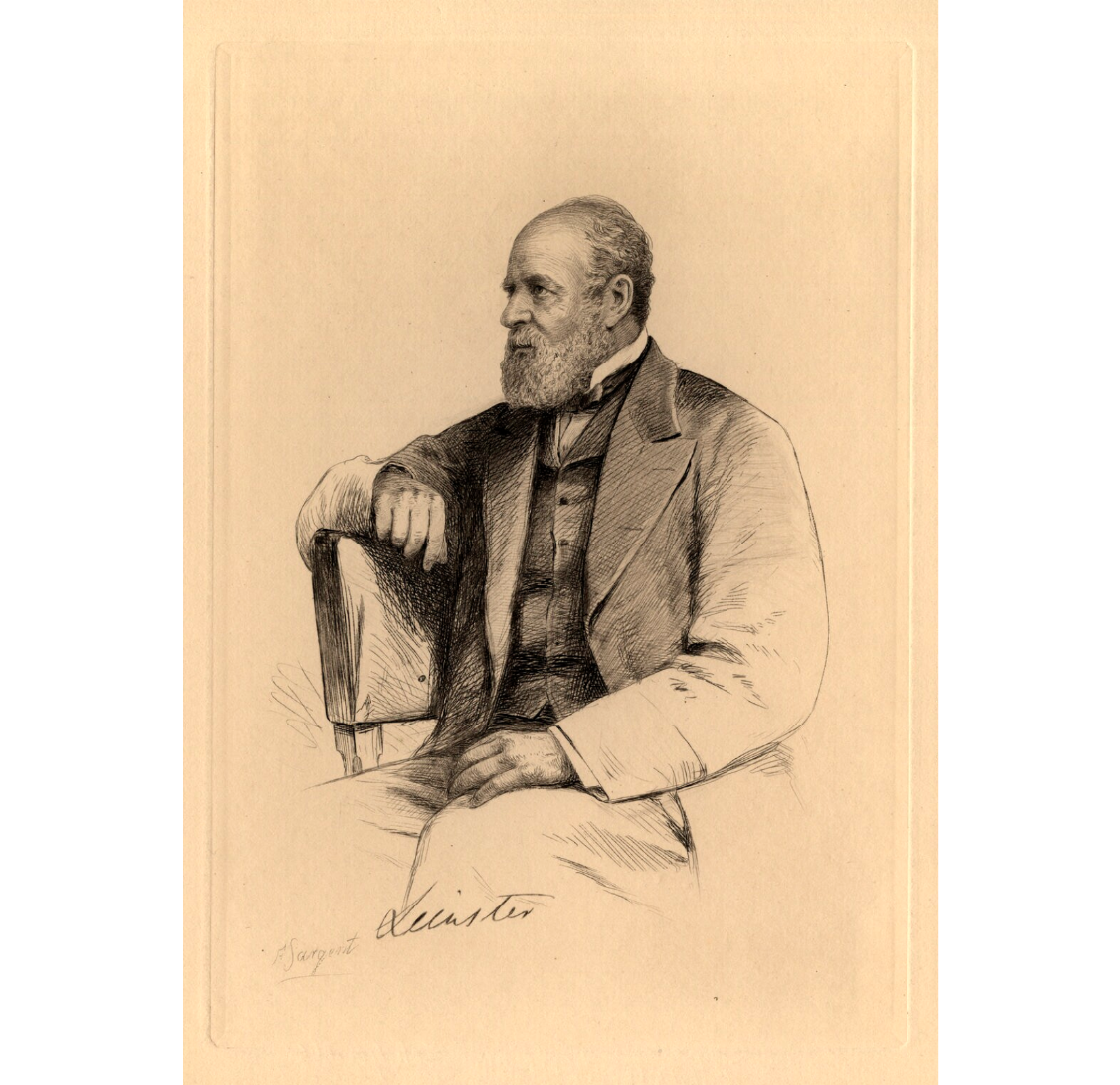
- Charles Fitzgerald, 4th Duke of Leinster.

Duke of Leinster
- Preceded by: Augustus Frederick FitzGerald, 3rd Duke of Leinster
- Succeeded by: Gerald FitzGerald, 5th Duke of Leinster

Personal details
- Born: 30 March 1819
- Died: 10 February 1887 (aged 67)
- Spouse: Lady Caroline Sutherland-Leveson-Gower
- Children: 15, incl Gerald FitzGerald, 5th Duke of Leinster
- Parents: Augustus FitzGerald, 3rd Duke of Leinster; Lady Charlotte Augusta Stanhope

Charles William FitzGerald, 4th Duke of Leinster, PC (30 March 1819 – 10 February 1887), styled Marquess of Kildare until 1874, was an Anglo-Irish peer and politician.

== Life, career and death ==
Leinster was born in Dublin, Ireland. He was the son of Augustus FitzGerald, 3rd Duke of Leinster and Lady Charlotte Augusta Stanhope, daughter of the 3rd Earl of Harrington.

Leinster was High Sheriff of Kildare for 1843 and Member of Parliament for County Kildare from 1847 to 1852. In 1870 he was granted a seat in the House of Lords as Baron Kildare in the peerage of the United Kingdom; he succeeded his father as Duke in 1874. When he inherited the titles, he also inherited 73,000 acres in Counties Kildare and Meath.

He died in Carton House, 1887.

== Marriage and issue ==
Leinster married Lady Caroline Sutherland-Leveson-Gower (15 April 1827 - Kilkea Castle, 13 May 1887), daughter of the Duke and Duchess of Sutherland, on 12 or 13 October 1847 at Trentham, Staffordshire, England. They had 15 children:

- Lady Geraldine FitzGerald (c. 1848 – 15 November 1867);
- Lady Mabel FitzGerald (c. 1849 – 13 September 1850);
- Gerald FitzGerald, 5th Duke of Leinster (16 August 1851 – 1 December 1893);
- Lord Maurice FitzGerald (Carton, 16 December 1852 – Johnstown Castle, 24 April 1901), married at Longford on 13 April 1880 Lady Adelaide Forbes (Dublin, 21 August 1860 – 18 November 1942), daughter of The Earl of Granard;
- Lady Alice FitzGerald (Carton, 12 December 1853 – 16 December 1941), married at Carton House on 2 May 1882 Sir Charles John Oswald FitzGerald (1840–1912); their daughter Mabel was later alleged to have been the secret wife of Alfred, Hereditary Prince of Saxe-Coburg and Gotha;
- Lady Eva FitzGerald (Kilkea Castle, 11 January 1855 – 13 February 1931), unmarried and without issue;
- Lady Mabel FitzGerald (Kilkea Castle, 16 December 1855 – 8 December 1939), unmarried and without issue;
- Major Lord Frederick FitzGerald (18 January 1857 – 8 March 1924), unmarried and without issue;
- Lord Walter FitzGerald (22 January 1858 – 31 July 1923), Captain 60th Rifles, antiquary; unmarried and without issue;
- Lord Charles FitzGerald (Kilkea Castle, 20 August 1859 – 28 June 1928), married in Calcutta on 21 November 1887 Alice Sidonia Claudius (died July 1909);
- Lord George FitzGerald (16 February 1862 – 23 February 1924);
- Lord Henry FitzGerald (Kilkea Castle, 9 August 1863 – 31 May 1955), married in Taplow on 21 January 1891 Inez Charlotte Grace Boteler (Taplow, 18__ - 1967);
- Lady Nesta FitzGerald (Kilkea Castle, 5 April 1865 – 7 December 1944), unmarried and without issue;
- Lady Margaret FitzGerald (c. 1866 – 26 October 1867);
- Lord Robert FitzGerald (23 December 1868 – 23 December 1868).

== Works ==
- The Earls of Kildare and their Ancestors: From 1057 to 1773. Hodges, Smith & Co., Dublin 1858.

== Notes ==
Parliament of the United Kingdom
Preceded by Robert Archbold; Richard More O'Ferrall	Member of Parliament for County Kildare; 1847–1852; With: Lord Naas 1847 – March 1852; William H. F. Cogan March–July 1852	Succeeded by David O'Connor Henchy; William H. F. Cogan
Peerage of Ireland
Preceded by Augustus FitzGerald	Duke of Leinster; 1874–1887	Succeeded by Gerald FitzGerald
Peerage of the United Kingdom
New creation	Baron Kildare; 1870–1887	Succeeded by Gerald FitzGerald
