= Sir Josiah Hort, 2nd Baronet =

Sir Josiah William Hort
- Born: 6 July 1791
- Died: 24 August 1876 (aged 85)
- Occupation: Member of the Parliament of the United Kingdom

Sir Josiah William Hort, 2nd Baronet (6 July 1791 – 24 August 1876) of Hortland, County Kildare, Ireland was a High Sheriff of Kildare and a Member of the Parliament of the United Kingdom.

== Early life ==
He was born the eldest son of Sir John Hort, 1st Baronet and educated at Westminster School and Trinity College, Cambridge (1809).

== Political life ==
He succeeded his father as a minor in 1807 and became the ward of Lord Henry Petty, later the 3rd Marquess of Lansdowne

He was appointed High Sheriff of Kildare for 1818–19 and was elected MP for County Kildare in 1831, sitting for only one year before coming in third place in the 1832 election. He was succeeded by his eldest son Sir John Josiah Hort, 3rd Baronet, an army officer.

== Death ==
He died in 1876.

== Family ==
He had married in 1823 Louisa Georgiana, the daughter and coheiress of Sir John Caldwell, 5th Baronet, of Castle Caldwell, County Fermanagh. They had 3 sons and 2 daughters.

Parliament of the United Kingdom
Preceded by Lord William FitzGerald; Richard More O'Ferrall	Member of Parliament for County Kildare; 1831–1832; With: Richard More O'Ferrall	Succeeded by Edward Ruthven; Richard More O'Ferrall
Baronetage of Great Britain
Preceded by John Hort	Baronet (of Castle Strange); 1807–1876	Succeeded by John Hort
