= South Kildare (UK Parliament constituency) =

Former UK constituency

- Former county constituency for the House of Commons

1885–1922
- Seats: 1
- Created from: County Kildare
- Replaced by: Kildare–Wicklow

South Kildare was a UK Parliament constituency in Ireland, returning one Member of Parliament from 1885 to 1922.

Prior to the 1885 general election the area was part of the County Kildare constituency. From 1922, on the establishment of the Irish Free State, it was not represented in the UK Parliament.

== Boundaries ==
This constituency comprised the southern part of County Kildare.

1885–1922: The baronies of East Offaly, Kicullen, Kilkea and Moone, Narragh and Reban East, and Narragh and Reban West, and that part of the barony of South Naas not contained within the North Kildare constituency.

== Members of Parliament ==
| Election | Member | Party | Note |
|---|---|---|---|
| 26 November 1885 | James Leahy | Irish Parliamentary | Party split |
| December 1890^{1} | James Leahy | Irish National League | |
| 13 July 1892 | Matthew Minch | Irish National Federation | |
| 3 October 1900 | Matthew Minch | Irish Parliamentary | Resigned |
| 23 May 1903 | Denis Kilbride | Irish Parliamentary | |
| 14 December 1918 ^{2} | Art O'Connor | Sinn Féin | Did not take his seat at Westminster |
| 26 October 1922 | UK constituency abolished | | |

Notes:

- ^{1} Not an election, but the date of a party change. The Irish Parliamentary Party had been created in 1882, on the initiative of Charles Stewart Parnell's Irish National League. Both the IPP and the INL split into Parnellite and Anti-Parnellite factions, in December 1890. The Parnellites remained members of the Irish National League after the split and the Anti-Parnellites organised the Irish National Federation in March 1891. The two organisations and the United Irish League merged in 1900, to re-create the Irish Parliamentary Party.
- ^{2} Date of polling day. The result was declared on 28 December 1918, to allow time for votes cast by members of the armed forces to be included in the count.

== Elections ==
=== Elections in the 1880s ===
General election 26 November 1885: Kildare South
| Party | Candidate | Votes | % | ±% |
|---|---|---|---|---|
| Irish Parliamentary | James Leahy | Unopposed | | |
| Registered electors | | 5,070 | | |
| Irish Parliamentary win (new seat) | | | | |

General election 6 July 1886: Kildare South
| Party | Candidate | Votes | % | ±% |
|---|---|---|---|---|
| Irish Parliamentary | James Leahy | Unopposed | | |
| Registered electors | | 5,070 | | |
| Irish Parliamentary hold | | | | |

=== Elections in the 1890s ===
General election 13 July 1892: Kildare South
| Party | Candidate | Votes | % | ±% |
|---|---|---|---|---|
| Irish National Federation | Matthew Minch | 2,642 | 73.0 | N/A |
| Irish National League | James Leahy | 975 | 27.0 | N/A |
| Majority | | 1,667 | 46.0 | N/A |
| Turnout | | 3,617 | 60.6 | N/A |
| Registered electors | | 5,973 | | |
| Irish National Federation gain from Irish Parliamentary | | Swing | N/A | |

General election 18 July 1895: Kildare South
| Party | Candidate | Votes | % | ±% |
|---|---|---|---|---|
| Irish National Federation | Matthew Minch | Unopposed | | |
| Registered electors | | 6,011 | | |
| Irish National Federation hold | | | | |

=== Elections in the 1900s ===
General election 3 October 1900: Kildare South
| Party | Candidate | Votes | % | ±% |
|---|---|---|---|---|
| Irish Parliamentary | Matthew Minch | Unopposed | | |
| Registered electors | | 7,573 | | |
| Irish Parliamentary hold | | | | |

By-election 23 May 1903: Kildare South
| Party | Candidate | Votes | % | ±% |
|---|---|---|---|---|
| Irish Parliamentary | Denis Kilbride | Unopposed | | |
| Registered electors | | 5,452 | | |
| Irish Parliamentary hold | | | | |

General election 17 January 1906: Kildare South
| Party | Candidate | Votes | % | ±% |
|---|---|---|---|---|
| Irish Parliamentary | Denis Kilbride | Unopposed | | |
| Registered electors | | 5,164 | | |
| Irish Parliamentary hold | | | | |

=== Elections in the 1910s ===
General election 19 January 1910: Kildare South
| Party | Candidate | Votes | % | ±% |
|---|---|---|---|---|
| Irish Parliamentary | Denis Kilbride | Unopposed | | |
| Registered electors | | 4,958 | | |
| Irish Parliamentary hold | | | | |

General election 9 December 1910: Kildare South
| Party | Candidate | Votes | % | ±% |
|---|---|---|---|---|
| Irish Parliamentary | Denis Kilbride | Unopposed | | |
| Registered electors | | 4,958 | | |
| Irish Parliamentary hold | | | | |

General Election 14 December 1918: Kildare South
| Party | Candidate | Votes | % | ±% |
|---|---|---|---|---|
| Sinn Féin | Art O'Connor | 7,104 | 82.1 | New |
| Irish Parliamentary | Denis Kilbride | 1,545 | 17.9 | N/A |
| Majority | | 5,559 | 64.2 | N/A |
| Turnout | | 8,649 | 62.1 | N/A |
| Registered electors | | 13,925 | | |
| Sinn Féin gain from Irish Parliamentary | | Swing | N/A | |
