= Poor Relief (Ireland) Act 1838 =

Act of the Parliament of the United Kingdom

Poor Relief (Ireland) Act 1838 (Note: The citation of this act by this short title was authorised by section 1 of, and the first schedule to, the Short Titles Act 1896. Due to the repeal of those provisions it is now authorised by section 19(2) of the Interpretation Act 1978.)
- Act of Parliament
- Parliament of the United Kingdom
- Long title: An Act for the more effectual Relief of the destitute Poor in Ireland.
- Citation: 1 & 2 Vict. c. 56
- Territorial extent: United Kingdom

Dates
- Royal assent: 31 July 1838
- Commencement: 31 July 1838 (Note: The Acts of Parliament (Commencement) Act 1793.)
Other legislation
| Amended by | Statute Law Revision Act 1874 (No. 2); Judicature (Northern Ireland) Act 1978; Statute Law Revision (Northern Ireland) Act 1980 |

Status: Amended

Text of statute as originally enacted

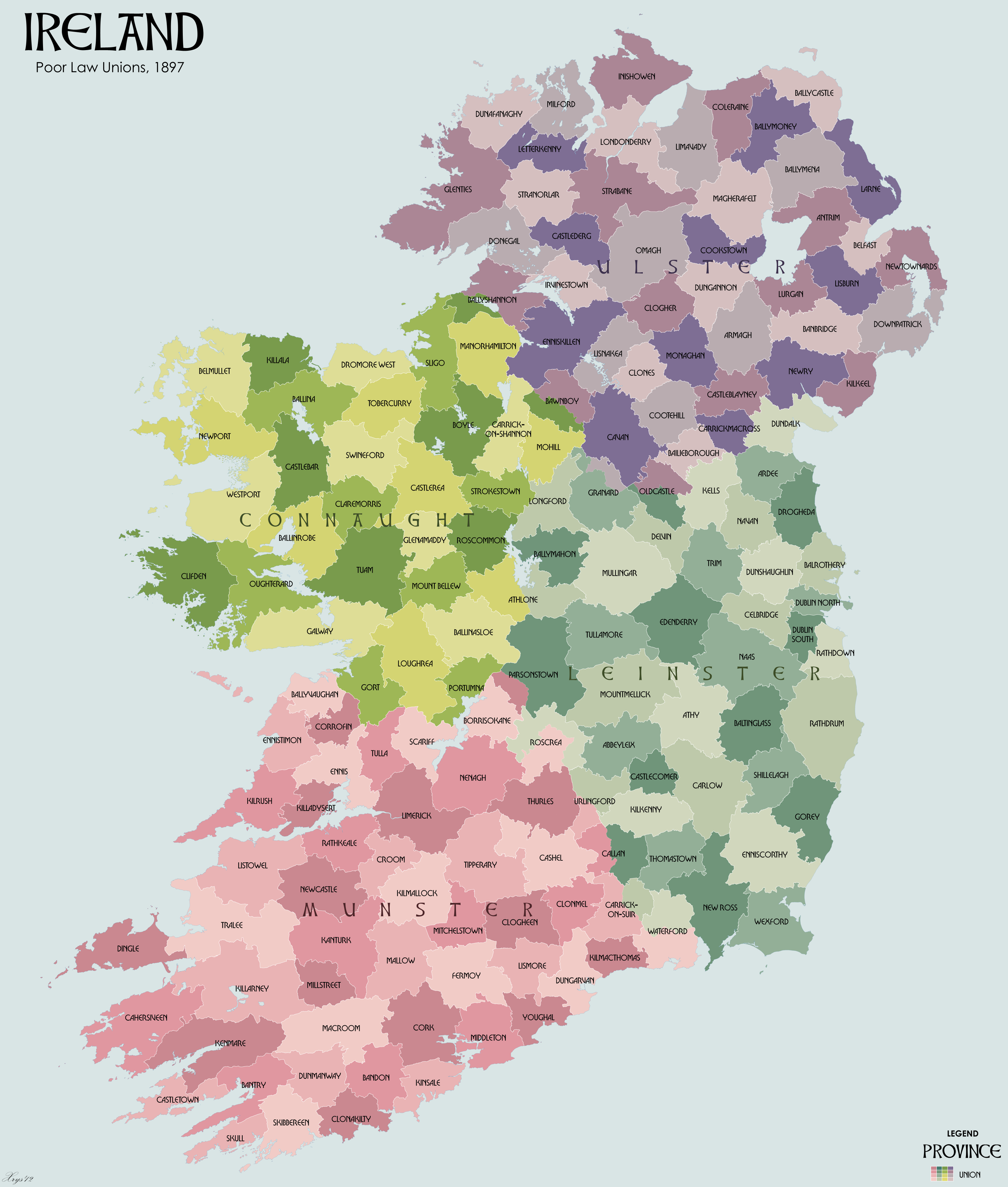
The Poor Law Unions of Ireland

The Poor Relief (Ireland) Act 1838 (1 & 2 Vict. c. 56) is an act of the Parliament of the United Kingdom that created the system of poor relief in Ireland. The legislation was largely influenced by the English Poor Law Amendment Act 1834.

Following its enactment, one hundred and thirty Poor Law Unions were established throughout the country. Each Union had a workhouse, financed by the payment of rates on landholders in the Union district. The administration of the Poor Law Unions in Ireland (PLU) was overseen by the Poor Law Commissioners who maintained control by setting up strict accounting and recording systems. Each PLU was managed locally by a board of Guardians who met weekly to oversee the running of the workhouse (indoor) and relief work schemes (outdoor).

The vast bulk of the surviving PLU records comprises Minute and Rate Books. To a much lesser degree indoor and outdoor relief registers and records such as death registers and porter’s books survive.

Minute Books contain the records of each weekly meeting of the Board of Guardians. They take account of the finances of the Union, procurement of provisions, hiring of staff, management of inmates, and any other issues that may arise as regards the week-to-week running of the Workhouse. The minute books also record the number of inmates in the workhouse, numbers admitted or left in the week as well as distinguishing between sexes, adults, and children. They also record the number of sick inmates and the number of deaths each week.

Rate Books account for the rates paid by occupiers of property and the nature of the property they occupied

Registers account for persons receiving relief from the Union. Indoor registers list the name, age, sex, religion, previous address, condition on entering, and date of entry and leaving the workhouse for each inmate.

== See also ==
- Irish Poor Law

== Bibliography ==
- "Miscellaneous Report: Exemptions from and Remission of Rates" (1968) 19 Northern Ireland Legal Quarterly 235 (June 1968). See also pages 3 and 6.
