= County Kildare (UK Parliament constituency) =

Former parliamentary constituency in the United Kingdom

- Former county constituency for the House of Commons
- County: County Kildare

1801–1885
- Seats: 2
- Created from: County Kildare (IHC)
- Replaced by: North Kildare and South Kildare

County Kildare is a former UK Parliament constituency in Ireland, returning two MPs to the United Kingdom House of Commons from 1801 to 1885.

== Boundaries ==
This constituency comprised the whole of County Kildare.

== Members of Parliament ==
| Date | First member | First party | Second member | Second party |
|---|---|---|---|---|
| 1801, 1 January | Maurice Keatinge | | John La Touche | Whig |
| 1802, 20 July | Lord Robert FitzGerald | Whig | Robert La Touche | |
| 1806, 21 November | Lord Robert FitzGerald | Whig | Robert La Touche | Whig |
| 1807, 21 May | Lord Henry FitzGerald | Whig | Robert La Touche | Whig |
| 1814, 23 March | Lord William FitzGerald | Whig | Robert La Touche | Whig |
| 1830, 18 August | Lord William FitzGerald | Whig | Richard More O'Ferrall | Whig |
| 1831, 9 May | Sir Josiah Hort, Bt | Whig | Richard More O'Ferrall | Whig |
| 1832, 21 December | Edward Ruthven | Repeal Association | Richard More O'Ferrall | Whig |
| 1837, 11 August | Robert Archbold | Whig | Richard More O'Ferrall | Whig |
| 1847, 18 August | Charles FitzGerald | Whig | Richard Bourke | Conservative |
| 1852, 13 March | Charles FitzGerald | Whig | William H. F. Cogan | Radical |
| 1852, 26 July | David O'Connor Henchy | Ind. Irish | William H. F. Cogan | Ind. Irish |
| 1857, 7 April | David O'Connor Henchy | Whig | William H. F. Cogan | Radical |
| 1859, 19 May | Richard More O'Ferrall | Whig | William H. F. Cogan | Radical |
| 1859, 6 June | Richard More O'Ferrall | Liberal | William H. F. Cogan | Liberal |
| 1865, 19 July | Lord Otho FitzGerald | Liberal | William H. F. Cogan | Liberal |
| 1874, 12 February | Charles Henry Meldon | Home Rule League | William H. F. Cogan | Liberal |
| 1880, 5 April | Charles Henry Meldon | Home Rule League | James Leahy | Home Rule League |
| 1882 | Charles Henry Meldon | Irish Parliamentary | James Leahy | Irish Parliamentary |

== Elections ==
=== Elections in the 1830s ===
General election 1830: Kildare
| Party | Candidate | Votes | % |
|---|---|---|---|
| Whig | Lord William FitzGerald | 178 | 47.1 |
| Whig | Richard More O'Ferrall | 119 | 31.5 |
| Whig | Marmaduke Cramer Roberts | 81 | 21.4 |
| Majority | | 38 | 10.1 |
| Turnout | | 286 | 57.7 |
| Registered electors | | 496 | |
| Whig hold | | | |
| Whig hold | | | |

General election 1831: Kildare
| Party | Candidate | Votes | % |
|---|---|---|---|
| Whig | Richard More O'Ferrall | Unopposed | |
| Whig | Josiah Hort | Unopposed | |
| Registered electors | | 496 | |
| Whig hold | | | |
| Whig hold | | | |

General election 1832: Kildare
| Party | Candidate | Votes | % |
|---|---|---|---|
| Repeal | Edward Ruthven | 262 | 48.3 |
| Whig | Richard More O'Ferrall | 216 | 39.9 |
| Whig | Josiah Hort | 64 | 11.8 |
| Turnout | | 327 | 29.4 |
| Registered electors | | 1,112 | |
| Majority | | 198 | 36.5 |
| Repeal gain from Whig | | | |
| Majority | | 152 | 28.1 |
| Whig hold | | | |

General election 1835: Kildare
| Party | Candidate | Votes | % | ±% |
|---|---|---|---|---|
| Whig | Richard More O'Ferrall | 446 | 38.2 | −1.7 |
| Repeal (Whig) | Edward Ruthven | 389 | 33.3 | −15.0 |
| Whig | Frederick Ponsonby | 333 | 28.5 | +16.7 |
| Turnout | | c. 584 | c. 50.7 | c. +21.3 |
| Registered electors | | 1,152 | | |
| Majority | | 57 | 4.9 | −23.2 |
| Whig hold | | Swing | +2.9 | |
| Majority | | 56 | 4.8 | −31.7 |
| Repeal hold | | Swing | −15.0 | |

O'Ferrall was appointed as a Commissioner of the Treasury, requiring a by-election.

By-election, 26 May 1835: Kildare
| Party | Candidate | Votes | % |
|---|---|---|---|
| Whig | Richard More O'Ferrall | Unopposed | |
| Whig hold | | | |

General election 1837: Kildare
| Party | Candidate | Votes | % | ±% |
|---|---|---|---|---|
| Whig | Richard More O'Ferrall | 762 | 44.3 | +6.1 |
| Whig | Robert Archbold | 728 | 42.3 | +13.8 |
| Conservative | Robert Burke | 226 | 13.1 | New |
| Repeal (Whig) | Edward Ruthven | 2 | 0.1 | −33.2 |
| Conservative | Anthony George Lefroy | 2 | 0.1 | New |
| Turnout | | 990 | 70.3 | c. +19.6 |
| Registered electors | | 1,408 | | |
| Majority | | 502 | 29.2 | +24.3 |
| Whig hold | | Swing | +11.4 | |
| Whig gain from Repeal | | Swing | +15.2 | |

=== Elections in the 1840s ===
General election 1841: Kildare
| Party | Candidate | Votes | % | ±% |
|---|---|---|---|---|
| Whig | Richard More O'Ferrall | Unopposed | | |
| Whig | Robert Archbold | Unopposed | | |
| Registered electors | | 978 | | |
| Whig hold | | | | |
| Whig hold | | | | |

General election 1847: Kildare
| Party | Candidate | Votes | % | ±% |
|---|---|---|---|---|
| Whig | Charles FitzGerald | 544 | 43.2 | N/A |
| Conservative | Richard Bourke | 413 | 32.8 | New |
| Repeal | John Augustus O'Neill | 301 | 23.9 | New |
| Turnout | | 629 (est) | 22.6 (est) | N/A |
| Registered electors | | 2,788 | | |
| Majority | | 131 | 10.4 | N/A |
| Whig hold | | Swing | N/A | |
| Majority | | 112 | 8.9 | N/A |
| Conservative gain from Whig | | Swing | N/A | |

=== Elections in the 1850s ===
Bourke was appointed Chief Secretary for Ireland, requiring a by-election.

By-election, 13 March 1852: Kildare
| Party | Candidate | Votes | % | ±% |
|---|---|---|---|---|
| Radical | William H. F. Cogan | Unopposed | | |
| Radical gain from Conservative | | | | |

General election 1852: Kildare
| Party | Candidate | Votes | % | ±% |
|---|---|---|---|---|
| Independent Irish | William H. F. Cogan | 1,431 | 41.6 | N/A |
| Independent Irish | David O'Connor Henchy | 1,392 | 40.5 | New |
| Conservative | Sir Charles Edward Bayly Kennedy, 2nd Baronet | 616 | 17.9 | −14.9 |
| Majority | | 776 | 22.6 | N/A |
| Turnout | | 2,028 (est) | 73.1 (est) | +50.5 |
| Registered electors | | 2,774 | | |
| Independent Irish gain from Whig | | Swing | | |
| Independent Irish gain from Conservative | | Swing | | |

General election 1857: Kildare
| Party | Candidate | Votes | % | ±% |
|---|---|---|---|---|
| Radical | William H. F. Cogan | Unopposed | | |
| Whig | David O'Connor Henchy | Unopposed | | |
| Registered electors | | 3,080 | | |
| Radical gain from Independent Irish | | | | |
| Whig gain from Independent Irish | | | | |

General election 1859: Kildare
| Party | Candidate | Votes | % | ±% |
|---|---|---|---|---|
| Liberal | William H. F. Cogan | Unopposed | | |
| Liberal | Richard More O'Ferrall | Unopposed | | |
| Registered electors | | 3,143 | | |
| Liberal hold | | | | |
| Liberal hold | | | | |

=== Elections in the 1860s ===
General election 1865: Kildare
| Party | Candidate | Votes | % | ±% |
|---|---|---|---|---|
| Liberal | William H. F. Cogan | Unopposed | | |
| Liberal | Otho FitzGerald | Unopposed | | |
| Registered electors | | 3,055 | | |
| Liberal hold | | | | |
| Liberal hold | | | | |

FitzGerald was appointed Treasurer of the Household, requiring a by-election.

By-election, 21 May 1866: Kildare
| Party | Candidate | Votes | % | ±% |
|---|---|---|---|---|
| Liberal | Otho FitzGerald | Unopposed | | |
| Registered electors | | 3,055 | | |
| Liberal hold | | | | |

General election 1868: Kildare
| Party | Candidate | Votes | % | ±% |
|---|---|---|---|---|
| Liberal | William H. F. Cogan | Unopposed | | |
| Liberal | Otho FitzGerald | Unopposed | | |
| Registered electors | | 2,999 | | |
| Liberal hold | | | | |
| Liberal hold | | | | |

Fitzgerald was appointed Comptroller of the Household, requiring a by-election.

By-election, 11 January 1869: Kildare
| Party | Candidate | Votes | % | ±% |
|---|---|---|---|---|
| Liberal | Otho FitzGerald | Unopposed | | |
| Registered electors | | 2,999 | | |
| Liberal hold | | | | |

=== Elections in the 1870s ===
General election 1874: Kildare
| Party | Candidate | Votes | % | ±% |
|---|---|---|---|---|
| Home Rule | Charles Henry Meldon | 1,296 | 40.3 | New |
| Liberal | William H. F. Cogan | 964 | 30.0 | N/A |
| Liberal | Otho FitzGerald | 727 | 22.6 | N/A |
| Home Rule | Hill Falconer Morgan | 226 | 7.0 | New |
| Turnout | | 1,607 (est) | 54.8 (est) | N/A |
| Registered electors | | 2,930 | | |
| Majority | | 569 | 17.7 | N/A |
| Home Rule gain from Liberal | | Swing | N/A | |
| Majority | | 738 | 7.4 | N/A |
| Liberal hold | | Swing | N/A | |

=== Elections in the 1880s ===
General election 1880: Kildare
| Party | Candidate | Votes | % | ±% |
|---|---|---|---|---|
| Home Rule | Charles Henry Meldon | 1,245 | 38.6 | −1.7 |
| Parnellite Home Rule League | James Leahy | 1,004 | 31.1 | +24.1 |
| Liberal | Richard More O'Ferrall | 684 | 21.2 | −8.8 |
| Home Rule | Alfred W Harris | 295 | 9.1 | −13.5 |
| Majority | | 320 | 9.9 | N/A |
| Turnout | | 1,929 (est) | 69.1 (est) | +14.3 |
| Registered electors | | 2,793 | | |
| Home Rule hold | | Swing | +3.6 | |
| Home Rule gain from Liberal | | Swing | +18.8 | |
