= Richard More O'Ferrall =

Irish-born British politician (1979–1880)

The Right Honourable Richard More O'Ferrall DL JP
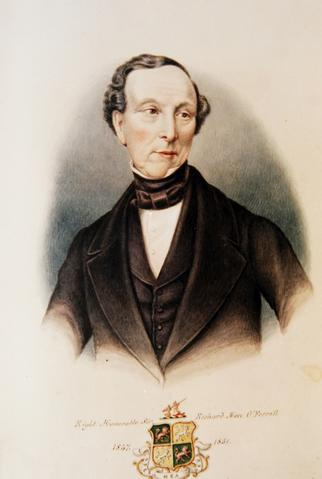

Governor of Malta
- In office October 1847 – 13 May 1851
- Prime Minister: Lord John Russell

Personal details
- Born: 10 April 1797 Balyna, Moyvalley, County Kildare, Kingdom of Ireland
- Died: 27 October 1880 (aged 83) Kingstown, County Dublin, United Kingdom
- Spouse(s): The Hon. Matilda, Southwell, daughter of The 3rd Viscount Southwell, KP (m. 1839)
- Education: St Gregory's, Acton Burnell; Stonyhurst College
- Awards: Deputy Lieutenant; Justice of the Peace

Military service
- Allegiance: Ireland

Richard More O'Ferrall, DL, JP, PC (10 April 1797 – 27 October 1880) was an Irish politician, a high level British government official and a Governor of Malta. Born to a noble Irish Catholic family at Balyna, he was the eldest son and heir of Ambrose More O'Ferrall. Educated at Stonyhurst College and St Gregory's, Acton Burnell, More O'Ferrall entered politics young, becoming Member of Parliament for County Kildare in 1830. In 1839, More O'Ferrall married Matilda, daughter of The 3rd Viscount Southwell, KP. After holding many senior roles, he was appointed Governor of Malta in 1847, a post he held until 1851. He was known to be a very honourable man and was made a deputy lieutenant and a justice of the peace as well as a Member of the Privy Council of the United Kingdom. He stepped down as a Member of Parliament for County Kildare in 1865. More O'Ferrall was widely respected, both in Ireland and Great Britain and has been praised for his achievements while Governor of Malta.

== Early life ==
Richard More O'Ferrall was born in Balyna in Moyvalley, County Kildare, Ireland, the eldest son of Major Ambrose O'Ferrall (1752–1835)- of an eminent Irish family of ancient lineage whose ancestors, the O'Mores, ruled the county of Laois- and his first wife, Anne Bagot, daughter of John Bagot, patriarch of another prominent Catholic family based at Castle Bagot, County Dublin. The ancestral home of the More O'Ferrall family is Balyna House, on the land given to the family as a New Year's gift by Elizabeth I in 1574. More O'Ferrall was directly related to two of the most famous Lords of Laois, Ruairí Óg Ó Mórdha and Rory O'Moore. He grew up on the family estate of Balyna, in Kildare and attended St Gregory's, Acton Burnell and Stonyhurst College. He was elected to the British House of Commons in 1832, and represented the Constituencies of County Kildare from 10 December 1832 to 29 July 1847, and subsequently Longford from 21 April 1851 to 7 July 1852 and Kildare again from 28 April 1859 to 11 July 1865.

== Career ==
He was elected to the British House of Commons in 1832, and represented the Constituencies of County Kildare from 10 December 1832 to 29 July 1847, and subsequently Longford from 21 April 1851 to 7 July 1852 and Kildare again from 28 April 1859 to 11 July 1865.

Under the Whig administration of Lord Melbourne, He entered the Government as a Lord Commissioner of the Treasury in 1835, and remained so until 1837.

He was a close friend of Cardinal Nicholas Wiseman. O'Ferrall served as a trustee of the Catholic College, St. Patrick's College, Maynooth.

On 28 September 1839, More O'Ferrall married Matilda (died 1882), the second daughter of The 3rd Viscount Southwell, KP. The couple had a son, Ambrose, and a daughter, Maria Anne, who married the Crimean War hero Sir Walter Nugent, 2nd Baronet, of Donore, County Westmeath, eldest son of Sir Percy Fitzgerald Nugent, 1st Baronet.

A week after his marriage, on 4 October 1839, More O'Ferrall was appointed to the Government as First Secretary of the Royal Navy, a post he retained until June 1841, when he briefly became Secretary to the Treasury. In October 1847 he became Governor of Malta. and, in 1841, Secretary to the Treasury. In 1847 he was the first civilian to hold the post of Governor of Malta. As such he helped develop the island into one of Britain's most important strategic naval bases. He also secured the passing of a new Constitution for Malta in 1849, which effectively allowed for Maltese home rule. On 12 September 1851 More O'Ferrall resigned as governor, refusing to serve under Lord John Russell, whose Ecclesiastical Titles Act was designed to prevent a restoration of the Roman Catholic hierarchy in England.

== Death ==
More O'Ferrall died on 27 October 1880 in Kingstown (present-day Dún Laoghaire), County Dublin. He had been a magistrate, grand juror, politician, aristocrat, governor and deputy-lieutenant for his native country. At his death, he was the oldest member of the Irish Privy Council. He was succeeded by his only son Ambrose (1846–1911), who in April 1880 unsuccessfully contested county Kildare as a Liberal.

== Arms ==
Coat of arms of Richard More O'Ferrall

Crest
1st, On a ducal coronet Or a greyhound springing Sable (O'Ferrall); 2nd, A dexter hand couped Gules, epaumée (More); 3rd, a dexter arm, vested, couped, in fesse, the hand, ppr., grasping a sword, erect (More).
Helm
Ducal coronet

Arms Quarterly, 1 and 4, Vert a lion rampant Or (O'Ferrall); 2 and 3, Vert a lion rampant and in chief three mullets Or.

Motto
Cu Reu Bhaid ("The hounds to victory")
Spes mea deus ("My hope in God")

== Ancestry ==
Ancestors of Richard More O'Ferrall

32
16. Richard O'Ferrall
33
8. Ambrose O'Ferrall, brewer of Dublin
34 William Ambrose
17. Catherine Ambrose
35
4. Richard O'Ferrall, banker of Dublin
36 Captain Robert Dillon
18. Theobald Dillon, merchant and banker of Dublin
37 Elinor Luther
9. Anne Dillon
38 Thomas White
19. Christian White
39 Anne Shee
2. Major Ambrose O'Ferrall
40 Anthony O'More
20. Lewis O'More
41 Anne Hope
10. James O'More
42 Con O'Neill
21. Alicia O'Neill
43
5. Laetitia O'More
44 Owen Madden of Kilmacshane co. Galway
22. Ambrose Madden of Derryhoran co. Galway
45 Dorothea Madden of Lismore co. Galway
11. Mary Madden
46 Samuel Raymond
23. Ellen Raymond
47
1. Richard More O'Ferrall
48
24.
49
12.
50
25.
51
6. John Bagot, of Bagot Castle co. Dublin
52
26.
53
13.
54
27.
55
3. Anne Bagot
56
28.
57
14.
58
29.
59
7. Mary Ann Walsh
60
30.
61
15.
62
31.
63

== Sources ==
Parliament of the United Kingdom
Preceded by Robert La Touche and Lord William Fitzgerald	Member of Parliament for County Kildare; 1830–1847; With: Lord William Fitzgerald to 1831; Sir Josiah Hort, Bt 1831–1832; Edward Ruthven 1832–1837; Robert Archbold 1837–1847	Succeeded by Marquess of Kildare and Richard Southwell Bourke
Preceded by Richard Maxwell Fox and Samuel Blackall	Member of Parliament for County Longford; 1851–1852; With: Richard Maxwell Fox	Succeeded by Richard Maxwell Fox and Fulke Greville-Nugent
Preceded by David O'Connor Henchy and William Cogan	Member of Parliament for County Kildare; 1859–1865; With: William Cogan	Succeeded by Lord Otho FitzGerald and William Cogan
Political offices
Preceded by	Junior Lord of the Treasury; 1835–1839	Succeeded by
Preceded by	First Secretary of the Admiralty; 1839–1841	Succeeded by
Preceded by	Financial Secretary to the Treasury; 1841–1841	Succeeded by
Preceded by Sir Patrick Stuart	Governor of Malta; 1847–1851	Succeeded by Sir William Reid
