= List of Irish constituencies =

The following list identifies every constituency used in Parliamentary etc. elections in Ireland (including Northern Ireland). The list consists of 'index names' for the seat and to identify what is potentially to be covered in a single constituency article.

The index name, which may vary from the official name or the name commonly used for a constituency in some respects, is constructed by putting the name of the geographical area first. If necessary (to distinguish between a borough constituency and a county constituency with the same geographical name) 'Borough', 'Cities', 'City' or 'Town' will be the second word of the Index Name to indicate the borough constituency. A compass point or more distinctive divisional name is to be placed next.

Special cases:

1. Dublin. The PHC constituency combined the city and county and its index name is 'Dublin'. The IHC and HC (pre-1885) constituencies follow the usual rule and are indexed as 'Dublin' and 'Dublin City'. The Dublin Harbour division of Dublin City is indexed simply as 'Dublin Harbour'. There have been North and South divisions of both the county and city as well as the complication that the Republic of Ireland ceased the division between borough and county constituencies in the 1970s. The modern North Dublin and South Dublin seem descended from the county rather than the city equivalents but the names commonly used do not make this clear. The index names used for the Dublin City divisions are 'Dublin City North' and 'Dublin City South'. The inclusion of county in the official names of the county divisions is not reflected in the index names.
2. Universities. 'National University of Ireland' and 'Queen's University of Belfast' are special cases.

== Institutions ==
The institutions included in this list are:

- Irish House of Commons (IHC)
- Irish seats in First Protectorate Parliament of the Commonwealth of England, Scotland and Ireland (PP)
- Irish (and Northern Irish) seats in the United Kingdom House of Commons (UKHC)
- Dáil Éireann (DÉ)
- House of Commons of Southern Ireland (SIHC)
- House of Commons of Northern Ireland (NIHC)
- University constituencies in Seanad Éireann (SÉ)
- Northern Ireland Assembly (NIA)
- Northern Ireland Constitutional Convention (NICC)
- Northern Ireland Forum (NIF)
- Irish and Northern Irish constituencies in the European Parliament (EP)

== List of Constituencies ==
Table of contents:

A B C D E F G H I J K L M N O P Q R S T U V W X Y Z

=== A ===
- Antrim:
  - County Antrim (UKHC)
  - Antrim (NIHC)
- Antrim Bann Side (NIHC). See: Bannside
- Antrim:
  - Antrim (NIHC) County Division
  - Antrim (IHC) Borough
- Antrim Carrick (NIHC) See: Carrick
- County Antrim (IHC)
- Antrim East See under "East Antrim"
- Antrim Larkfield (NIHC) See: Larkfield
- Antrim Larne (NIHC) See: Larne
- Antrim Mid See under "Mid Antrim"
- Antrim Newtownabbey (NIHC) See: Newtownabbey
- Antrim North See under "North Antrim"
- Antrim South See under "South Antrim"
- Ardee (IHC)
- Ardfert (IHC)
- Ards (NIHC)
- Armagh:
  - Armagh (NIA)
  - Armagh (NIHC)
  - Armagh (UKHC)
- Armagh (IHC)
- Armagh Central (Northern Ireland Parliament constituency) (NIHC) See: Central Armagh
- Armagh City (UKHC)
- County Armagh (IHC) County
- Armagh Mid (Northern Ireland Parliament constituency) (NIHC) See: Mid Armagh (UKHC)
- Armagh North (Northern Ireland Parliament constituency) (NIHC) See under "North Armagh"
- Armagh South (Northern Ireland Parliament constituency) (NIHC) See: South Armagh
- Askeaton (IHC)
- Athboy (IHC)
- Athenry (IHC)
- Athlone:
  - Athlone (IHC)
  - Athlone (UKHC)
- Athlone–Longford (DÉ)
- Athy (IHC)
- Augher (IHC)

=== B ===
- Ballynakill (IHC)
- Ballyshannon (IHC)
- Baltimore (IHC)
- Baltinglass (IHC)
- Banagher (IHC)
- Bandonbridge (IHC)
- Bandon (UKHC)
- Bandon and Kinsale (PP)
- Bangor:
  - Bangor (IHC)
  - Bangor (NIHC)
- Bannow (IHC)
- Bannside (NIHC)
- Belfast:
  - Belfast IHC
  - Belfast (UKHC)
- Belfast Ballynafeigh (NIHC)
- Belfast Bloomfield (NIHC)
- Belfast Central (NIHC)
- Belfast Cromac:
  - Belfast Cromac (DÉ)
  - Belfast Cromac (NIHC)
  - Belfast Cromac
- Belfast Dock (NIHC)
- Belfast Duncairn:
  - Belfast Duncairn (NIHC)
  - Belfast Duncairn (UKHC)
- Belfast East:
  - Belfast East (NIA)
  - Belfast East (NICC)
  - Belfast East (NIF)
  - Belfast East (NIHC)
  - Belfast East (UKHC)
- Belfast Falls:
  - Belfast Falls (NIHC)
  - Belfast Falls (UKHC)
- Belfast North:
  - Belfast North (NIA)
  - Belfast North (NICC)
  - Belfast North (NIF)
  - Belfast North (NIHC)
  - Belfast North (UKHC)
- Belfast Oldpark (NIHC)
- Belfast Ormeau (UKHC)
- Belfast Pottinger:
  - Belfast Pottinger (NIHC)
  - Belfast Pottinger (UKHC)
- Belfast St Anne's:
  - Belfast St Anne's (NIHC)
  - Belfast St Anne's (UKHC)
- Belfast Shankill:
  - Belfast Shankill (NIHC)
  - Belfast Shankill (UKHC)
- Belfast South:
  - Belfast South (NIA)
  - Belfast South (NICC)
  - Belfast South (NIF)
  - Belfast South (NIHC)
  - Belfast South (UKHC)
- Belfast Victoria:
  - Belfast Victoria (NIHC)
  - Belfast Victoria (UKHC)
- Belfast West:
  - Belfast West (NIA)
  - Belfast West (NICC)
  - Belfast West (NIF)
  - Belfast West (NIHC)
  - Belfast West (UKHC)
- Belfast Willowfield (NIHC)
- Belfast Windsor (NIHC)
- Belfast Woodvale:
  - Belfast Woodvale (NIHC)
  - Belfast Woodvale (UKHC)
- Belturbet (IHC)
- Blessington (IHC)
- Boyle (IHC)

=== C ===
- Callan (IHC)
- Carlingford (IHC)
- Carlow (borough):
  - Carlow (IHC) Also named "Carlow Town" Borough
  - Carlow (UKHC)
- County Carlow:
  - County Carlow (IHC)
  - County Carlow (UKHC)
- Carlow–Kildare (DÉ)
- Carlow–Kilkenny:
  - Carlow–Kilkenny (DÉ)
  - Carlow–Kilkenny (SIHC)
- Carlow, Wexford, Kilkenny and Queen's (PP)
- Carrick:
  - Carrick (IHC)
  - Carrick (NIHC)
- Carrickfergus:
  - Carrickfergus (IHC)
  - Carrickfergus (UKHC)
  - Carrickfergus and Belfast (PP)
- Carysfort (IHC)
- Cashel
  - Cashel IHC
  - Cashel (UKHC)
- Castlebar (IHC)
- Castlemartyr (IHC)
- Causeway (UKHC)
- Cavan:
  - Cavan (UKHC)
  - Cavan (DÉ) County
- Cavan (IHC)
- County Cavan (IHC) County
- Cavan East (UK Parliament constituency) (UKHC) See: County Cavan (UKHC)
- Cavan, Fermanagh and Monaghan (PP)
- Cavan–Monaghan (DÉ)
- Cavan West (UK Parliament constituency) (UKHC) See: West Cavan (UKHC)
- Central Armagh (UKHC)
- Charlemont (IHC)
- Charleville (IHC)
- City of Londonderry
- Clare:
  - County Clare (IHC)
  - Clare (UKHC)
  - Clare (SIHC)
  - Clare (DÉ)
- Clare East See: East Clare
- Clare–South Galway (DÉ)
- Clare West See: West Clare
- Clogher (IHC)
- Clonakilty (IHC)
- Clonmel:
  - Clonmel (IHC)
  - Clonmel (UKHC)
- Clonmines (IHC)
- Coleraine:
  - Coleraine (IHC)
  - Coleraine (UKHC)
- Connacht–Ulster (EP)
- Cork and Youghall (PP) Borough
- Cork Borough:
  - Cork Borough (DÉ)
  - Cork Borough (SIHC)
- Cork City:
  - Cork City (IHC)
  - Cork City (DÉ)
  - Cork City (UKHC)
  - Cork City North-West (DÉ)
  - Cork City South-East (DÉ)
- County Cork:
  - County Cork (PP) County
  - County Cork (UKHC)
- Cork East (DÉ) See also under "East Cork"
- Cork East and North East:
  - Cork East and North East (DÉ)
  - Cork East and North East (SIHC)
- Cork Mid (DÉ) See also under "Mid Cork"
- Cork Mid, North, South, South East and West:
  - Cork Mid, North, South, South East and West (DÉ)
  - Cork Mid, North, South, South East and West (SIHC)
- Cork North (DÉ) See also under "North Cork"
- Cork North-Central (DÉ)
- Cork North-East (DÉ)
- Cork North-West (DÉ)
- Cork South (DÉ) See also under "South Cork"
- Cork South-Central (DÉ)
- Cork South-East (DÉ)
- Cork South-West (DÉ)
- Cork West (DÉ) See also under "West Cork"
- County Limerick (UKHC)
- County Louth (UKHC)
- County Wexford (UKHC)

=== D ===
- Derry and Coleraine (PP) Borough
- Derry, Donegal and Tyrone (PP)
- Dingle (IHC)
- Donegal:
  - Donegal (DÉ) County
  - Donegal (UKHC) County
- Donegal (IHC)
- County Donegal (IHC)
- Donegal East (DÉ)
- Donegal East (UKHC) See: East Donegal (UKHC)
- Donegal–Leitrim (DÉ)
- Donegal North (UKHC) See: North Donegal (UKHC)
- Donegal South (UK Parliament constituency) (UKHC) See: South Donegal (UKHC)
- Donegal North-East (DÉ)
- Donegal South-West (DÉ)
- Donegal West (DÉ)
- Donegal West (UKHC) See: West Donegal (UKHC)
- Doneraile (IHC)
- Down:
  - County Down (IHC) County
  - County Down (UKHC) County
- Down, Antrim and Armagh (PP)
- Down Ards (Northern Ireland Parliament constituency) (NIHC) See: Ards
- Down Bangor (Northern Ireland Parliament constituency) (NIHC) See: Bangor (NIHC)
- Down East:
  - Down East (Northern Ireland Parliament constituency) (NIHC) See: East Down
  - Down East (UK Parliament constituency) (UKHC) See: East Down
- Down Iveagh (Northern Ireland Parliament constituency) (NIHC) See: Iveagh
- Down Mid:
  - Down Mid (Northern Ireland Parliament constituency) (NIHC) See: Mid Down
  - Down Mid (UK Parliament constituency) (UKHC) See: Mid Down
- Down Mourne (Northern Ireland Parliament constituency) (NIHC) See: Mourne
- Down North:
  - Down North (Assembly constituency) (NIA) See: North Down
  - Down North (NICC)
  - Down North (NIF)
  - Down North (Northern Ireland Parliament constituency) (NIHC) See: North Down (NIHC)
  - Down North (UK Parliament constituency) (UKHC) See: North Down (UKHC)
- Down South:
  - Down South (Assembly constituency) (NIA) See: South Down (NIA)
  - Down South (NICC)
  - Down South (NIF)
  - Down South (Northern Ireland Parliament constituency) (NIHC) See: South Down
  - Down South (UK Parliament constituency) (UKHC) See: South Down
- Down West:
  - Down West (Northern Ireland Parliament constituency) (NIHC) See: West Down
  - Down West (UK Parliament constituency) (UKHC) See: West Down
- Downpatrick:
  - Downpatrick (IHC)
  - Downpatrick (UKHC)
- Drogheda:
  - Drogheda (IHC)
  - Drogheda (UKHC)
- Dublin (EP)
- Dublin Artane (DÉ)
- Dublin Ballyfermot (DÉ)
- Dublin Cabra (DÉ)
- Dublin Central (DÉ)
- Dublin City:
  - Dublin City (IHC)
  - Dublin City (UKHC)
- Dublin Clontarf:
  - Dublin Clontarf (DÉ)
  - Dublin Clontarf (UKHC)
- Dublin College Green:
  - Dublin College Green (DÉ)
  - Dublin College Green (UKHC)
- County Dublin:
  - County Dublin (IHC)
  - County Dublin (UKHC)
- Dublin Finglas (DÉ)
- Dublin Harbour (UKHC)
- Dublin Mid (DÉ)
- Dublin Mid-West(constituency):
  - Dublin Mid-West (DÉ)
  - Dublin Mid West (SIHC)
- Dublin North(constituency):
  - Dublin North (DÉ)
  - Dublin North (DÉ)
  - Dublin North (UK Parliament constituency) (UKHC) See: North Dublin (UKHC)
- Dublin North-Central (DÉ)
- Dublin North-East (DÉ)
- Dublin North-West:
  - Dublin North-West (DÉ)
  - Dublin North-West (SIHC)
- Dublin Pembroke (UKHC)
- Dublin Rathdown (DÉ)
- Dublin Rathmines (UKHC)
- Dublin Rathmines West (DÉ)
- Dublin St James's (UKHC)
- Dublin St Michan's (UKHC)
- Dublin St Patrick's (UKHC)
- Dublin St Stephen's Green (UKHC)
- Dublin South:
  - Dublin South (SIHC)
  - Dublin South (DÉ)
  - Dublin South (DÉ)
  - Dublin South (UK Parliament constituency) (UKHC) See: South Dublin
- Dublin South-Central (DÉ)
- Dublin South-East (DÉ)
- Dublin South-West (DÉ)
- Dublin Townships (DÉ)
- Dublin University:
  - University of Dublin (IHC)
  - University of Dublin (UKHC)
  - University of Dublin (DÉ)
  - University of Dublin (SIHC)
  - University of Dublin (SÉ)
- Dublin West (DÉ)
- Duleek (IHC)
- Dún Laoghaire (DÉ)
- Dundalk:
  - Dundalk (IHC)
  - Dundalk (UKHC)
- Dungannon:
  - Dungannon (IHC)
  - Dungannon (UKHC)
- Dungarvan:
  - Dungarvan (IHC)
  - Dungarvan (UKHC)
- Dunleer (IHC)

=== E ===
- East (EP)
- East Antrim:
  - East Antrim (NIA)
  - East Antrim (NIF)
  - East Antrim (UKHC)
- East Cavan (UKHC)
- East Clare (UKHC) See also under "Clare East"
- East Cork (UKHC) See also under "Cork East"
- East Donegal (UKHC) See also "Donegal East"
- East Down:
  - East Down (NIHC) See also "Down East"
  - East Down (UKHC)
- East Galway (UKHC)
- East Kerry (UKHC)
- East Limerick (UKHC) See also under "Limerick East"
- East Londonderry:
  - East Londonderry
  - East Londonderry (NIA)
  - East Londonderry (NIF)
- East Mayo (UKHC) See also under "Mayo North"
- East Tipperary (UKHC)
- East Tyrone
- East Tyrone (UKHC)
- East Waterford (UKHC)
- East Wicklow (UKHC)
- Ennis:
  - Ennis (IHC)
  - Ennis (UKHC)
- Enniscorthy (IHC)
- Enniskillen:
  - Enniskillen (IHC)
  - Enniskillen (NIHC)
  - Enniskillen (UKHC)

=== F ===
- County Fermanagh (IHC) County
- Fermanagh and Tyrone:
  - Fermanagh and Tyrone (NIHC)
  - Fermanagh and Tyrone (UKHC)
- Fermanagh and South Tyrone:
  - Fermanagh and South Tyrone (NIA)
  - Fermanagh and South Tyrone (NICC)
  - Fermanagh and South Tyrone (NIF)
  - Fermanagh and South Tyrone (UKHC)
- Fermanagh Enniskillen (Northern Ireland Parliament constituency) (NIHC) See: Enniskillen (NIHC)
- Fermanagh Lisnaskea (Northern Ireland Parliament constituency) (NIHC) See: Lisnaskea (NIHC)
- Fermanagh North:
  - Fermanagh North (DÉ)
  - Fermanagh North (UK Parliament constituency) (UKHC) See: North Fermanagh
- Fermanagh South:
  - Fermanagh South (Northern Ireland Parliament constituency) (NIHC) See: South Fermanagh (NIHC)
  - Fermanagh South (UK Parliament constituency) (UKHC) See: South Fermanagh
- Fethard:
  - Fethard (IHC)
  - Fethard (IHC)
- Fore (IHC)
- Foyle:
  - Foyle (NIA)
  - Foyle (NIF)
  - Foyle (NIHC)
  - Foyle (UKHC)

=== G ===
- Galway (DÉ)
- Galway and Mayo (PP) County
- Galway Borough:
  - Galway Town (IHC)
  - Galway Borough (UKHC)
- Galway Connemara (UKHC)
- County Galway (IHC)
- Galway East:
  - Galway East (UK Parliament constituency) (UKHC) See: East Galway
  - Galway East (DÉ)
- Galway North:
  - Galway North (UK Parliament constituency)(UKHC) See: North Galway
  - Galway North (DÉ)
- Galway North-East (DÉ)
- Galway South:
  - Galway South (DÉ)
  - Galway South (UK Parliament constituency) (UKHC) See: South Galway
- Galway West (DÉ)
- Gorey (IHC)
- Gowran (IHC)
- Granard (IHC)

=== H ===
- Harristown (IHC)
- Hillsborough (IHC)

=== I ===
- Inistioge (IHC)
- Ireland East (European Parliament constituency) (EP) See: East
- Ireland North-West (European Parliament constituency) (EP) See: North-West
- Ireland South (European Parliament constituency) (EP) See: South
- Iveagh (NIHC) See also "Down Iveagh".

=== J ===
- Jamestown (IHC)

=== K ===
- Kells (IHC) County
- Kerry, Limerick and Clare (PP)
- Kerry–Limerick West:
  - Kerry–Limerick West (DÉ)
  - Kerry–Limerick West (SIHC)
- County Kerry (IHC)
- Kerry East (UK Parliament constituency) (UKHC) See: East Kerry (UKHC)
- Kerry North (constituency:
  - Kerry North (DÉ)
  - Kerry North (UK Parliament constituency) (UKHC) See: North Kerry (UKHC)
- Kerry South:
  - Kerry South (DÉ)
  - Kerry South (UK Parliament constituency) (UKHC) See: South Kerry (UKHC)
- Kerry West (UK Parliament constituency) (UKHC) See: West Kerry (UKHC)
- Kilbeggan (IHC)
- Kildare (IHC)
- County Kildare (IHC)
- Kildare North:
  - Kildare North (DÉ)
  - Kildare North (UK Parliament constituency) (UKHC) See: North Kildare (UKHC)
- Kildare South:
  - Kildare South (DÉ)
  - Kildare South (UK Parliament constituency) (UKHC) See: South Kildare (UKHC)
- Kildare–Wicklow:
  - Kildare–Wicklow (PP)
  - Kildare–Wicklow (DÉ)
  - Kildare–Wicklow (SIHC)
- Kilkenny City:
  - Kilkenny City (IHC)
  - Kilkenny City (UKHC)
- County Kildare (IHC)
- Kilkenny North (UK Parliament constituency) (UKHC) See: North Kilkenny
- Kilkenny South (UK Parliament constituency) (UKHC) See: South Kilkenny
- Killybegs (IHC)
- Killyleagh (IHC)
- Kilmallock (IHC)
- King's County:
  - King's County (IHC)
  - King's County (UKHC)
- King's County Birr (UKHC)
- King's County Tullamore (UKHC)
- Kinsale:
  - Kinsale (IHC)
  - Kinsale (UKHC)
- Knocktopher (IHC)

=== L ===
- Lagan Valley:
  - Lagan Valley (NIA)
  - Lagan Valley (NIF)
  - Lagan Valley (NIHC)
  - Lagan Valley (UKHC)
- Lanesborough (IHC)
- Laois–Offaly:
  - Laois–Offaly (SIHC)
  - Laois–Offaly (DÉ)
- Larkfield (NIHC)
- Larne (NIHC)
- Leinster (EP)
- Leitrim:
  - County Leitrim (IHC) County
  - Leitrim (UKHC)
  - Leitrim (DÉ)
- Leitrim North (UK Parliament constituency) (UKHC) See: North Leitrim
- Leitrim South (UK Parliament constituency) (UKHC) See: South Leitrim
- Leitrim–Roscommon North (DÉ)
- Leitrim–Sligo (DÉ)
- Lifford (IHC)
- Limerick (DÉ)
- Limerick City:
  - Limerick City (DÉ)
  - Limerick City (UKHC)
  - Limerick City (IHC)
- Limerick City and Killmallock (PP)
- Limerick City–Limerick East:
  - Limerick City–Limerick East (SIHC)
  - Limerick City–Limerick East (DÉ)
- County Limerick:
  - County Limerick (IHC)
  - County Limerick )(UK Parliament constituency) See: County Limerick
- Limerick East:
  - Limerick East (DÉ)
  - Limerick East (UK Parliament constituency) (UKHC) See: East Limerick
- Limerick West:
  - Limerick West (DÉ)
  - Limerick West (UK Parliament constituency) (UKHC) See: West Limerick
- Lisburn:
  - Lisburn (IHC)
  - Lisburn (UKHC)
- Lisburn (IHC)
- Lismore (IHC)
- Lisnaskea (NIHC)
- Londonderry:
  - Londonderry (UKHC)
  - Londonderry (NIA)
  - Londonderry (NIHC)
  - Londonderry (NICC)
- Londonderry City:
  - Londonderry City (IHC)
  - Londonderry City (DÉ)
  - Londonderry City (UKHC)
  - Londonderry City (Northern Ireland Parliament constituency) (NIHC) See: City of Londonderry
  - Londonderry City (IHC)
- County Londonderry (IHC)
- Londonderry East: See "East Londonderry"
- Londonderry Mid (NIHC) See: Mid Londonderry
- Londonderry North: See "North Londonderry"
- Londonderry South:
  - Londonderry South (UK Parliament constituency) (UKHC) See: South Londonderry
  - Londonderry South (Northern Ireland Parliament constituency) (NIHC) See: Mid Londonderry
- Longford (UKHC)
- Longford (IHC)
- County Longford (IHC)
- Longford North (UK Parliament constituency) (UKHC) See: North Longford
- Longford–Roscommon (DÉ)
- Longford South (UK Parliament constituency) (UKHC) See: South Longford
- Longford–Westmeath:
  - Longford–Westmeath (SIHC)
  - Longford–Westmeath (DÉ)
- Louth (Dáil constituency):
  - Louth (DÉ)
  - Louth (UK Parliament constituency) (UKHC) See: County Louth (UKHC)
  - County Louth (IHC)
- Louth–Meath:
  - Louth–Meath (SIHC)
  - Louth–Meath (DÉ)
  - Louth–Meath (PP)
- Louth North (UK Parliament constituency) (UKHC) See: North Louth
- Louth South (UK Parliament constituency) (UKHC) See: South Louth

=== M ===
- Mallow:
  - Mallow (IHC)
  - Mallow (UKHC)
- Maryborough (IHC)
- Mayo:
- County Mayo (IHC) County
- Mayo (DÉ)
- Mayo (UKHC)
- Mayo East:
  - Mayo East (DÉ)
  - Mayo East (UK Parliament constituency) (UKHC) See: East Mayo
- Mayo North:
  - Mayo North (DÉ)
  - Mayo North (UK Parliament constituency) (UKHC) See: North Mayo
- Mayo North and West:
  - Mayo North and West (DÉ)
  - Mayo North and West (SIHC)
- Mayo South:
  - Mayo South (DÉ)
  - Mayo South (UK Parliament constituency) (UKHC) See: South Mayo
- Mayo South–Roscommon South:
  - Mayo South–Roscommon South (DÉ)
  - Mayo South–Roscommon South (SIHC)
- Mayo West:
  - Mayo West (DÉ)
  - Mayo West (UK Parliament constituency) (UKHC) See: West Mayo
- Meath:
  - County Meath (IHC)
  - Meath (DÉ)
  - Meath (UKHC)
- Meath East (DÉ)
- Meath North (UK Parliament constituency) (UKHC) See: North Meath
- Meath South (UK Parliament constituency) (UKHC) See: South Meath
- Meath West (DÉ)
- Meath–Westmeath (DÉ)
- Mid Antrim:
  - Mid Antrim (DÉ)
  - Mid Antrim (NIHC)
  - Mid Antrim (UKHC)
- Mid Armagh (UKHC)
- Mid Cork (UKHC) See also under "Cork Mid"
- Mid Down:
  - Mid Down (NIHC) See also under "Down Mid"
  - Mid Down (UKHC)
- Mid Londonderry (NIHC)
- Mid Tipperary (UKHC)
- Mid Tyrone:
  - Mid Tyrone
  - Mid Tyrone (UKHC)
- Mid Ulster:
  - Mid Ulster (NIA)
  - Mid Ulster (UKHC)
- Midleton (IHC)
- Monaghan (Dáil constituency):
  - Monaghan (DÉ) County
  - Monaghan (SIHC) County
  - Monaghan (UKHC) County
- Monaghan (IHC)
- County Monaghan (IHC)
- Monaghan North (UK Parliament constituency) (UKHC) See: North Monaghan (UKHC)
- Monaghan South (UK Parliament constituency) (UKHC) See: South Monaghan
- Mourne (NIHC)
- Mullingar (IHC)
- Munster (EP)

=== N ===
- Naas (IHC)
- National University of Ireland:
  - National University of Ireland (Dáil constituency) (DÉ)
  - National University of Ireland (Dáil constituency) (SIHC)
  - National University of Ireland (Seanad Éireann constituency) (SÉ)
  - National University of Ireland (UK Parliament constituency) (UKHC)
- Navan (IHC)
- New Ross:
  - New Ross (IHC)
  - New Ross (UKHC)
- Newcastle (IHC)
- Newry:
  - Newry (IHC)
  - Newry (UKHC)
- Newry (IHC)
- Newry and Armagh:
  - Newry and Armagh (NIA)
  - Newry and Armagh (NIF)
  - Newry and Armagh (UKHC)
- Newtownabbey (NIHC)
- Newtown Limavady (IHC)
- Newtownards (IHC)
- Northern Ireland (EP)
- North Antrim:
  - North Antrim (NIA)
  - North Antrim (NICC)
  - North Antrim (NIF)
  - North Antrim (NIHC)
  - North Antrim (UKHC)
- North Armagh (UKHC) See also under "Armagh North"
- North Cork (UKHC) See also under "Cork North"
- North Dublin (UKHC)
- North Donegal (UKHC) See also under "Donegal North"
- North Down: See also under "Down North"
  - North Down (NIA)
  - North Down (NIHC) See also under "Down North"
  - North Down
- North Fermanagh (UKHC)
- North Galway (UKHC)
- North Kilkenny
- North Kildare (UKHC) See also "Kildare North"
- North Kerry (UKHC) See also "Kerry North"
- North Leitrim
- North Londonderry:
  - North Londonderry (UKHC)
  - North Londonderry (NIHC)
- North Longford (UKHC)
- North Louth (UKHC)
- North Mayo (UKHC) See also under "Mayo North"
- North Meath (UKHC)
- North Monaghan (UKHC)
- North Roscommon (UKHC)
- North Sligo (UKHC)
- North Tipperary (UKHC)
- North Tyrone:
  - North Tyrone (NIHC)
  - North Tyrone (UKHC)
- North East Tyrone (UKHC)
- North West Tyrone (UKHC)
- North Westmeath (UKHC)
- North Wexford (UKHC)
- North-West (EP)

=== O ===
- Old Leighlin (IHC)

=== P ===
- Philipstown (IHC)
- Portarlington (UKHC)
- Portarlington (IHC)

=== Q ===
- Queen's County:
  - Queen's County (IHC)
  - Queen's County (UKHC)
- Queen's County Leix (UKHC)
- Queen's County Ossory (UKHC)
- Queen's University of Belfast:
  - Queen's University of Belfast (NIHC)
  - Queen's University of Belfast (UKHC)

=== R ===
- Randalstown (IHC)
- Rathcormack (IHC)
- Ratoath (IHC)
- Roscommon:
  - Roscommon (DÉ)
  - Roscommon (UKHC)
- Roscommon (IHC)
- County Roscommon (IHC)
- Roscommon North (UK Parliament constituency) (UKHC) See: North Roscommon
- Roscommon South (UK Parliament constituency) (UKHC) See: South Roscommon
- Roscommon–Leitrim (DÉ)
- Roscommon–South Leitrim (DÉ)

=== S ===
- St Canice (IHC)
- St Johnstown (IHC)
- St Johnstown (IHC)
- Sligo
- Sligo (IHC)
- County Sligo (IHC)
- Sligo–Leitrim (DÉ)
- Sligo–North Leitrim (DÉ)
- Sligo–Mayo East:
  - Sligo–Mayo East (DÉ)
  - Sligo–Mayo East (SIHC)
- Sligo North (UK Parliament constituency) (UKHC) See: North Sligo
- Sligo, Roscommon and Leitrim (PP) County
- Sligo South (UK Parliament constituency) (UKHC) See: South Sligo
- South (EP)
- South Antrim:
  - South Antrim (NIA)
  - South Antrim (NICC)
  - South Antrim (NIF)
  - South Antrim (NIHC)
  - South Antrim (UKHC)
  - South Armagh (UKHC)
- South Cork (UKHC) See also under "Cork South"
- South Donegal (UKHC) See also "Donegal South"
- South Dublin (UKHC)
- South Down (NIA)
- South Down (NIHC) See also under "Down South"
- South Down
- South Fermanagh (NIHC) See also under "Fermanagh South"
- South Galway (UKHC)
- South Kilkenny (UKHC)
- South Kildare (UKHC) See also under "Kildare South"
- South Kerry UKHC) See also "Kerry South"
- South Leitrim (UKHC)
- Mid Londonderry: See also under "Londonderry South"
  - Mid Londonderry (NIHC)
  - South Londonderry (UKHC)
- South Longford (UKHC)
- South Louth (UKHC)
- South Mayo (UKHC) See also under "Mayo North"
- South Meath (UKHC)
- South Monaghan (UKHC)
- South Roscommon (UKHC)
- South Sligo (UKHC)
- South Tipperary (UKHC)
- South Tyrone:
- South Tyrone (NIHC)
- South Tyrone (UKHC)
- South Westmeath (UKHC)
- South Wexford (UKHC)
- Sperrin (UKHC)
- Strabane (IHC)
- Strangford:
  - Strangford (NIA)
  - Strangford (NIF)
  - Strangford (UKHC)
- Swords (IHC)

=== T ===
- Taghmon (IHC)
- Tallow (IHC)
- Thomastown (IHC)
- Tipperary:
  - County Tipperary (IHC) County
  - Tipperary (DÉ)
  - Tipperary (UKHC)
- Tipperary East (UK Parliament constituency) (UKHC) See: East Tipperary
- Tipperary Mid (UK Parliament constituency) (UKHC) See: Mid Tipperary
- Tipperary Mid, North and South:
  - Tipperary Mid, North and South (SIHC)
  - Tipperary Mid, North and South (DÉ)
- Tipperary North:
  - Tipperary North (DÉ)
  - Tipperary North (UK Parliament constituency) (UKHC) See: North Tipperary
- Tipperary South:
  - Tipperary South (DÉ)
  - Tipperary South (UK Parliament constituency) (UKHC) See: South Tipperary
- Tralee (IHC)
- Trim (IHC)
- Tuam (IHC)
- Tulsk (IHC)
- County Tyrone (IHC) County
- Tyrone East:
  - East Tyrone (Northern Ireland Parliament constituency) (NIHC) See: East Tyrone
  - Tyrone East (UK Parliament constituency) (UKHC) See: East Tyrone
- Tyrone Mid:
  - Tyrone Mid (Northern Ireland Parliament constituency) (NIHC) See: Mid Tyrone (Northern Ireland Parliament constituency)
  - Tyrone Mid (UK Parliament constituency) (UKHC) See: Mid Tyrone
- Tyrone North:
  - Tyrone North (Northern Ireland Parliament constituency) (NIHC) See: North Tyrone
  - Tyrone North (UK Parliament constituency) (UKHC) See: North Tyrone (UKHC)
- Tyrone North-East (UK Parliament constituency) (UKHC) See: North East Tyrone
- Tyrone North-West (UK Parliament constituency) (UKHC) See: North West Tyrone
- Tyrone South:
  - Tyrone South (Northern Ireland Parliament constituency) (NIHC) See: South Tyrone
  - Tyrone South (UK Parliament constituency) (UKHC) See: South Tyrone
- Tyrone West:
  - Tyrone West (Assembly constituency) (NIA) See: West Tyrone
  - Tyrone West (NIF)
  - Tyrone West (Northern Ireland Parliament constituency) (NIHC) See: West Tyrone
  - Tyrone West (UK Parliament constituency) (UKHC) See: West Tyrone

=== U ===
- Ulster Mid:
  - Ulster Mid (Assembly constituency) (NIA) See: Mid Ulster
  - Ulster Mid (NICC)
  - Ulster Mid (NIF)
  - Ulster Mid (UK Parliament constituency) (UKHC) See: Mid Ulster
- Upper Bann:
  - Upper Bann (NIA)
  - Upper Bann (NIF)
  - Upper Bann (UKHC)

=== W ===
- Waterford (DÉ) County
- Waterford and Clonmel (PP) Cities
- Waterford and Tipperary (PP) County
- Waterford City (Parliament of Ireland constituency):
  - Waterford City (IHC)
  - Waterford City (UKHC)
- County Waterford (IHC)
- Waterford East (UK Parliament constituency) (UKHC) See: East Waterford
- Waterford–Tipperary East:
  - Waterford–Tipperary East (SIHC)
  - Waterford–Tipperary East (DÉ)
- Waterford West (UK Parliament constituency) (UKHC) See: West Waterford
- West Cavan (UKHC)
- West Clare (UKHC)
- West Cork (UKHC) See also under "Cork West"
- West Donegal (UKHC) See also "Donegal West"
- West Down:
  - West Down (NIHC)
  - West Down (UKHC)
- West Kerry (UKHC)
- West Limerick (UKHC) See also under "Limerick West"
- West Mayo (UKHC) See also under "Mayo North"
- West Tyrone:
  - West Tyrone (NIA)
  - West Tyrone (NIHC)
  - West Tyrone (UKHC)
- West Waterford (UKHC)
- West Wicklow (UKHC)
- Westmeath (DÉ) County
- County Westmeath (IHC) County
- Westmeath, Longford and King's (PP)
- Westmeath North (UKHC) See: North Westmeath (UKHC)
- Westmeath South (UKHC) See: South Westmeath (UKHC)
  - Wexford (DÉ)
- Wexford (IHC)
- County Wexford:
  - County Wexford (IHC)
  - County Wexford (UK Parliament constituency) (UKHC) See: County Wexford
- Wexford North (UK Parliament constituency) (UKHC) See: North Wexford
- Wexford South (UK Parliament constituency) (UKHC) See: South Wexford
- Wicklow:
  - Wicklow (DÉ)
  - Wicklow (UKHC)
- Wicklow (IHC)
- County Wicklow (IHC)
- Wicklow East (UK Parliament constituency) (UKHC) See: East Wicklow
- Wicklow West (UK Parliament constituency) (UKHC) See: West Wicklow

=== Y ===
- Youghal:
  - Youghal (IHC)
  - Youghal (UKHC)

== See also ==
- Irish House of Commons
- List of United Kingdom Parliament constituencies in Ireland and Northern Ireland
- Historic Dáil constituencies
