= Thomas Derrig =

Irish politician (1897–1956)

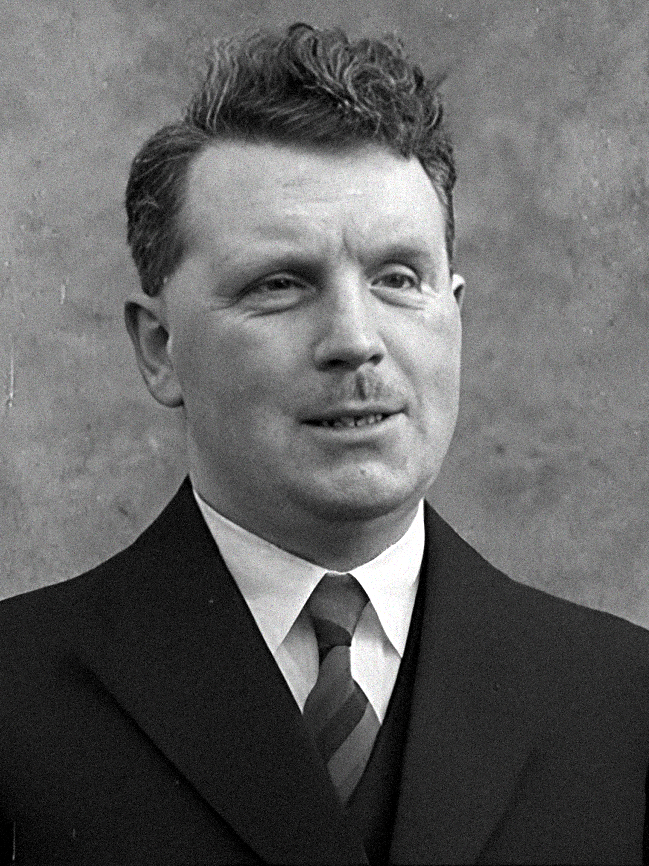
- Derrig in 1933

Minister for Lands
- In office 13 June 1951 – 2 June 1954
- Taoiseach: Éamon de Valera
- Preceded by: Joseph Blowick
- Succeeded by: Joseph Blowick
- In office 8 September 1939 – 2 July 1943
- Taoiseach: Éamon de Valera
- Preceded by: Gerald Boland
- Succeeded by: Seán Moylan

Minister for Education
- In office 18 June 1940 – 18 February 1948
- Taoiseach: Éamon de Valera
- Preceded by: Éamon de Valera
- Succeeded by: Richard Mulcahy
- In office 9 March 1932 – 8 September 1939
- Taoiseach: Éamon de Valera
- Preceded by: John M. O'Sullivan
- Succeeded by: Seán T. O'Kelly

Minister for Posts and Telegraphs
- In office 8 September 1939 – 27 September 1939
- Taoiseach: Éamon de Valera
- Preceded by: Oscar Traynor
- Succeeded by: Patrick Little

Teachta Dála
- In office February 1948 – 19 November 1956
- In office June 1927 – July 1937
- Constituency: Carlow–Kilkenny
- In office July 1937 – February 1948
- Constituency: Kilkenny
- In office May 1921 – August 1923
- Constituency: Mayo North and West

Personal details
- Born: 26 November 1897 Westport, County Mayo, Ireland
- Died: 19 November 1956 (aged 58) Dublin, Ireland
- Party: Fianna Fáil
- Spouse: Sinéad Mason (m. 1928)
- Children: 2
- Education: University College Galway

Military service
- Branch/service: Irish Republican Army; Anti-Treaty IRA
- Battles/wars: Irish War of Independence; Irish Civil War

Thomas Derrig (Irish: Tomás Ó Deirg; 26 November 1897 – 19 November 1956) was an Irish Fianna Fáil politician who served as Minister for Lands from 1939 to 1943 and 1951 to 1954, Minister for Education from 1932 to 1939 and 1940 to 1948 and Minister for Posts and Telegraphs in September 1939. He served as a Teachta Dála (TD) from 1921 to 1923 and 1927 to 1957.

== Early life ==
Derrig was born on 26 November 1897, in Westport, County Mayo, the son of Patrick Derrig and Winifred Derrig (née Sammon). He was educated locally and later at University College Galway.

== Revolutionary period ==
During his time in college he organised a corps of the Irish Volunteers. Derrig did not take part in the 1916 Easter Rising but was arrested in the aftermath. He was imprisoned in Woking, Wormwood Scrubs and Frongoch internment camp. He was arrested in July 1918, and was accused of attempting to disarm a soldier. He was sentenced to five months imprisonment by a court in Belfast. When he was released in November 1918, he supported Joseph MacBride at the 1918 Irish general election. After his release, he graduated from college and became headmaster in a technical college in Mayo.

During the Irish War of Independence he was the Brigade Commandant of the West Mayo Brigade of the Irish Republican Army (IRA), before being captured in January 1921 and interned at the Curragh Camp. While there he was elected a Sinn Féin TD for Mayo North and West. During the Truce period, he was appointed Divisional Director of Organisation of 4 Western Division IRA.

Taking the anti-Treaty side in the Irish Civil War, Derrig took part in fighting against National forces in Dublin. He escaped from Dublin on 30 June 1922 and served as Adjutant to Ernest O'Malley during fighting in counties Wicklow and Wexford in July and August. Derrig was appointed IRA Adjutant General by Liam Lynch in November 1922 and was serving in that position when arrested by National Forces on 6 April 1923. On that same date, while in custody of the Criminal Investigation Department in Oriel House, Derrig was shot in the face by a CID detective and lost his left eye. Derrig was interned at Kilmainham Gaol and was a leader there during the 1923 Irish hunger strikes Derrig was later awarded a pension by the Irish government under the Military Service Pensions Act, 1934 for his service with the Irish Volunteers and the IRA between 1917 and 1923.

In 1928, he married Sinéad Mason of Ards, County Down; they had two daughters.

== Political career ==
At the June 1927 general election he was elected to Dáil Éireann as a Fianna Fáil TD for Carlow–Kilkenny. In Éamon de Valera's first government in 1932 Derrig was appointed Minister for Education. Derrig initiated a review of industrial and reformatory schools and the rules under the Children Act 1908 (8 Edw. 7. c. 67), resulting in the critical 1936 Cussen Report that followed which he shelved, and a report in 1946–1948 by the Irish-American priest Father Edward Flanagan, which was also shelved. His lack of action was noted in 2009 when the Ryan Report examined the subsequent management of these "residential institutions"; Derrig was the first Minister to seek a report that could have resulted in much-needed reforms. It has been suggested that he did not want to follow British law reforms in the 1920s and 1930s, because of his strong anti-British views, and that Irish children had suffered needlessly as a result.

From 1939 to 1943, he served as Minister for Lands. He was re-appointed to Education in 1943 until 1948. During this period a bitter teachers' strike, involving the Irish National Teachers' Organisation (INTO), took place, lasting from 20 March to 30 October. He was challenged at a public meeting in 1945 when he called for history to inculcate a spirt of self-sacrifice, only to be followed by the historrian Professor Robert Dudley Edwards disagreed with this view and said that the teaching of the subject in school was 'something dull and learned by heart' and needed reform. Between 1951 and 1954, Derrig became Minister for Lands again.

Thomas Derrig died in Dublin on 19 November 1956, seven days before his 59th birthday. No by-election was held for his seat.

Political offices
Preceded by John M. O'Sullivan	Minister for Education; 1932–1939	Succeeded by Seán T. O'Kelly
Preceded by Oscar Traynor	Minister for Posts and Telegraphs; 1939	Succeeded by Patrick Little
Preceded by Gerald Boland	Minister for Lands; 1939–1943	Succeeded by Seán Moylan
Preceded by Éamon de Valera	Minister for Education; 1940–1948	Succeeded by Richard Mulcahy
Preceded by Joseph Blowick	Minister for Lands; 1951–1954	Succeeded by Joseph Blowick

Dáil	Election	Deputy (Party)	Deputy (Party)	Deputy (Party)	Deputy (Party)
2nd	1921	Joseph MacBride (SF)	John Crowley (SF)	Thomas Derrig (SF)	P. J. Ruttledge (SF)
3rd	1922	Joseph MacBride (PT-SF)	John Crowley (AT-SF)	Thomas Derrig (AT-SF)	P. J. Ruttledge (AT-SF)
4th	1923	Constituency abolished. See Mayo North and Mayo South			

Dáil	Election	Deputy (Party)	Deputy (Party)	Deputy (Party)	Deputy (Party)	Deputy (Party)
2nd	1921	Edward Aylward (SF)	W. T. Cosgrave (SF)	James Lennon (SF)	Gearóid O'Sullivan (SF)	4 seats 1921–1923
3rd	1922	Patrick Gaffney (Lab)	W. T. Cosgrave (PT-SF)	Denis Gorey (FP)	Gearóid O'Sullivan (PT-SF)	4 seats 1921–1923
4th	1923	Edward Doyle (Lab)	W. T. Cosgrave (CnaG)	Denis Gorey (FP)	Michael Shelly (Rep)	Seán Gibbons (CnaG)
4th	1925 by-election	Edward Doyle (Lab)	W. T. Cosgrave (CnaG)	Denis Gorey (FP)	Michael Shelly (Rep)	Thomas Bolger (CnaG)
5th	1927 (Jun)	Edward Doyle (Lab)	W. T. Cosgrave (CnaG)	Denis Gorey (CnaG)	Thomas Derrig (FF)	Richard Holohan (FP)
6th	1927 (Sep)	Edward Doyle (Lab)	W. T. Cosgrave (CnaG)	Peter de Loughry (CnaG)	Thomas Derrig (FF)	Richard Holohan (FP)
6th	1927 by-election	Edward Doyle (Lab)	Denis Gorey (CnaG)	Peter de Loughry (CnaG)	Thomas Derrig (FF)	Richard Holohan (FP)
7th	1932	Francis Humphreys (FF)	Denis Gorey (CnaG)	Desmond FitzGerald (CnaG)	Thomas Derrig (FF)	Seán Gibbons (FF)
8th	1933	James Pattison (Lab)	Richard Holohan (NCP)	Desmond FitzGerald (CnaG)	Thomas Derrig (FF)	Seán Gibbons (FF)
9th	1937	Constituency abolished. See Kilkenny and Carlow–Kildare				

Dáil	Election	Deputy (Party)	Deputy (Party)	Deputy (Party)	Deputy (Party)	Deputy (Party)
13th	1948	James Pattison (NLP)	Thomas Walsh (FF)	Thomas Derrig (FF)	Joseph Hughes (FG)	Patrick Crotty (FG)
14th	1951	Francis Humphreys (FF)	Thomas Walsh (FF)	Thomas Derrig (FF)	Joseph Hughes (FG)	Patrick Crotty (FG)
15th	1954	James Pattison (Lab)	Thomas Walsh (FF)	Thomas Derrig (FF)	Joseph Hughes (FG)	Patrick Crotty (FG)
15th	1956 by-election	James Pattison (Lab)	Martin Medlar (FF)	Thomas Derrig (FF)	Joseph Hughes (FG)	Patrick Crotty (FG)
16th	1957	Francis Humphreys (FF)	Martin Medlar (FF)	Jim Gibbons (FF)	Joseph Hughes (FG)	Patrick Crotty (FG)
16th	1960 by-election	Patrick Teehan (FF)	Martin Medlar (FF)	Jim Gibbons (FF)	Joseph Hughes (FG)	Patrick Crotty (FG)
17th	1961	Séamus Pattison (Lab)	Martin Medlar (FF)	Jim Gibbons (FF)	Desmond Governey (FG)	Patrick Crotty (FG)
18th	1965	Séamus Pattison (Lab)	Tom Nolan (FF)	Jim Gibbons (FF)	Desmond Governey (FG)	Patrick Crotty (FG)
19th	1969	Séamus Pattison (Lab)	Tom Nolan (FF)	Jim Gibbons (FF)	Desmond Governey (FG)	Kieran Crotty (FG)
20th	1973	Séamus Pattison (Lab)	Tom Nolan (FF)	Jim Gibbons (FF)	Desmond Governey (FG)	Kieran Crotty (FG)
21st	1977	Séamus Pattison (Lab)	Tom Nolan (FF)	Jim Gibbons (FF)	Liam Aylward (FF)	Kieran Crotty (FG)
22nd	1981	Séamus Pattison (Lab)	Tom Nolan (FF)	Desmond Governey (FG)	Liam Aylward (FF)	Kieran Crotty (FG)
23rd	1982 (Feb)	Séamus Pattison (Lab)	Jim Gibbons (FF)	Desmond Governey (FG)	Liam Aylward (FF)	Kieran Crotty (FG)
24th	1982 (Nov)	Séamus Pattison (Lab)	M. J. Nolan (FF)	Dick Dowling (FG)	Liam Aylward (FF)	Kieran Crotty (FG)
25th	1987	Séamus Pattison (Lab)	M. J. Nolan (FF)	Martin Gibbons (PDs)	Liam Aylward (FF)	Kieran Crotty (FG)
26th	1989	Séamus Pattison (Lab)	M. J. Nolan (FF)	Phil Hogan (FG)	Liam Aylward (FF)	John Browne (FG)
27th	1992	Séamus Pattison (Lab)	M. J. Nolan (FF)	Phil Hogan (FG)	Liam Aylward (FF)	John Browne (FG)
28th	1997	Séamus Pattison (Lab)	John McGuinness (FF)	Phil Hogan (FG)	Liam Aylward (FF)	John Browne (FG)
29th	2002	Séamus Pattison (Lab)	John McGuinness (FF)	Phil Hogan (FG)	Liam Aylward (FF)	M. J. Nolan (FF)
30th	2007	Mary White (GP)	John McGuinness (FF)	Phil Hogan (FG)	Bobby Aylward (FF)	M. J. Nolan (FF)
31st	2011	Ann Phelan (Lab)	John McGuinness (FF)	Phil Hogan (FG)	John Paul Phelan (FG)	Pat Deering (FG)
31st	2015 by-election	Ann Phelan (Lab)	John McGuinness (FF)	Bobby Aylward (FF)	John Paul Phelan (FG)	Pat Deering (FG)
32nd	2016	Kathleen Funchion (SF)	John McGuinness (FF)	Bobby Aylward (FF)	John Paul Phelan (FG)	Pat Deering (FG)
33rd	2020	Kathleen Funchion (SF)	John McGuinness (FF)	Jennifer Murnane O'Connor (FF)	John Paul Phelan (FG)	Malcolm Noonan (GP)
34th	2024	Natasha Newsome Drennan (SF)	John McGuinness (FF)	Jennifer Murnane O'Connor (FF)	Catherine Callaghan (FG)	Peter "Chap" Cleere (FF)

Dáil	Election	Deputy (Party)	Deputy (Party)	Deputy (Party)
9th	1937	James Pattison (Lab)	Thomas Derrig (FF)	Denis Gorey (FG)
10th	1938	James Pattison (Lab)	Thomas Derrig (FF)	Denis Gorey (FG)
11th	1943	James Pattison (Lab)	Thomas Derrig (FF)	Philip Mahony (CnaT)
12th	1944	James Pattison (NLP)	Thomas Derrig (FF)	Eamonn Coogan (FG)
13th	1948	Constituency abolished. See Carlow–Kilkenny		
