= Mayo North =

Mayo North or North Mayo may refer to one of two parliamentary constituencies in County Mayo, Ireland:

- Mayo North (Dáil constituency) (1923–1969)
- North Mayo (UK Parliament constituency) (1885–1922)
