= Mayo West =

Mayo West or West Mayo may refer to one of two parliamentary constituencies in County Mayo, Ireland:

- Mayo West (Dáil constituency) (1969–1997)
- West Mayo (UK Parliament constituency) (1885–1922)

See also

- County Mayo
