= John Deasy =

John Deasy may refer to:

- John Deasy (Fine Gael politician) (born 1967), Irish Fine Gael politician, Teachta Dála (TD) for Waterford from 2002
- John Deasy (UK MP) (1856–1896), Irish nationalist politician, Member of Parliament (MP) 1884–1893
- John E. Deasy (born 1961), American educator, former superintendent for Los Angeles Unified School District from 2011 to 2014
