= Joseph McBride =

Joe or Joseph McBride may refer to:

== Footballers ==
- Joe McBride (footballer, born 1938) (1938–2012), Scottish football player
- Joe McBride (footballer, born 1960), Scottish football player and coach

== Others ==
- Joseph McBride (writer) (born 1947), American, also academic
- Joseph Macay McBride (born 1982), American baseball player
- Joe McBride (musician) keyboardist/singer and nephew of Bake McBride

== See also ==
- Joseph MacBride (died 1938), Irish activist & politician
