= Daniel Crilly =

Irish Member of Parliament and author

Daniel Crilly (14 December 1857 - December 1923) was an Irish Parliamentary Party Member of Parliament and the author of a number of books.

After education at the Catholic Institute in Liverpool and at Sedgley Park School, Wolverhampton, Daniel Crilly was apprenticed to a cotton broker in Liverpool and served his full apprenticeship before becoming a journalist. In 1876 he became editor of the Liverpool United Irishman and in 1880, he joined the staff of The Nation in Dublin.

In 1885, he was elected to the Mayo North constituency for the Irish Parliamentary Party. He joined the Anti-Parnellite Irish National Federation when the party split in 1891, and remained as an MP until 1900. He was honorary secretary of the Home Rule Confederation and then of the Irish National League of Great Britain.

In 1887 he was put on trial in Dublin as an alleged promoter of the Plan of Campaign, but prosecution was abandoned due to non-agreement of the jury.

He married in 1887 in Dublin. He was a visitor at the Southwark Irish Literary Club in London.

Parliament of the United Kingdom
New constituency	Member of Parliament for North Mayo; 1885 – 1900	Succeeded by Conor O'Kelly
