= Daniel Boyle (politician) =

British politician

Daniel Boyle (10 January 1859 – 19 August 1925) was an Irish Parliamentary Party politician. He was elected at the January 1910 general election as the Member of Parliament (MP) for North Mayo, and held the seat until his defeat at the 1918 general election by the Sinn Féin candidate, John Crowley.

== Early life ==
Daniel Boyle was born on 10 January 1859 at Kilcoo, near Belleek, by Lough Melvin in County Fermanagh. He was the younger son of Donal Boyle, a tenant farmer, and in such circumstances, he saw little future in agriculture. He excelled as a pupil in the local National School, where he was something of a prodigy; indeed, he was offered the position of principal of a village school at the age of eighteen. However, in common with many Irish men and women of his generation, he emigrated to industrial Lancashire instead, arriving in Manchester in 1877. His educational qualifications enabled him to find employment as a clerk with the Midland Railway Company in the city, working his way through the ranks until 1889, when he resigned. Although he had obtained the position of Registrar of Births and Deaths in the Ancoats Division, he intended to concentrate upon a possible career as a freelance journalist (in addition to contributing to English newspapers, he had become the Manchester correspondent of the Freeman's Journal). Transport was to remain an important interest, but perhaps not as much as politics. In his spare time, he had become active in the Irish National League, and was soon Secretary of the branch in the East Manchester Constituency. His talents were soon noticed and, after assisting in the organisation of the INL convention in Manchester, he was asked by T.P. O’Connor to accept the position as representative of the Irish Party in Lancashire and Cheshire. He was also very active in the Irish National Foresters (a sick and burial friendly society) travelling at weekends to establish branches in the North and Midlands. He acted as head of the society on several occasions, as well as secretary of the Manchester district. Boyle also found time to act as vice-president of the Catholic Registration Society (an organisation designed to enable Roman Catholics to be placed on voters lists).

== Manchester Council ==
In 1894, Boyle was elected to the Manchester City Council for New Cross Ward (adjoining St Michael's, in present-day Ancoats), the largest ward in the city, and with a large population of Irish origin. Soon after his election, he lobbied and led delegations against a proposal to build huge barrack-like lodging-houses. Instead, he persuaded the council to build cottage dwellings. He was re-elected in 1897, with one of the largest number of votes ever recorded in a Manchester Council election. Boyle was involved in the long-term re-organisation of the Manchester City Police after the revelations of an official enquiry revealed widespread corruption. He also interested himself in the affairs of the Manchester Ship Canal (Manchester City Council had come to the rescue of the project when it ran out of money, and still possessed a substantial shareholding in the Canal Company). In May 1897 the local monthly magazine 'Manchester Faces and Places' published a profile.

"It is as much by character as by speech that Mr Boyle has so soon secured the respect and ear of the assembly. Sound sense, good humour and the wit which is the dower of the Irish race – these are the qualities which tell powerfully for the cause he may be advocating. On the platform Mr Boyle... is an orator. His voice is sonorous and musical... and when particularly he speaks on politics he gives the ring and earnestness and even of passion. Just the touch of the accent of his country aids rather than mars the effect of his speech."

== Dan Boyle's Railway ==
Boyle was (and is) chiefly remembered in Manchester as the 'father' of Manchester Corporation Tramways. He was invited to become Chairman of the Tramways Committee in 1898, after only four years on the council, and moved the resolution to purchase the horse tramway system that same year. In this position, he took on the complex task of organising the purchase of the Manchester Carriage and Tramways Company, the promotion of Five Parliamentary Bills, and the reconstruction, electrification, and expansion of the entire municipal tramway system. The first electric tram route opened in 1901. Speaking at the banquet to celebrate the opening, he said that the object was to provide a good service with the best possible conditions, and, not least, to give the ratepayers a decent return on their capital. The system soon evolved under his leadership to embrace 140 miles of track, with 450 tramcars travelling 30,000 miles a day, and carrying 130 million passengers. Mancunians dubbed it "Dan Boyle’s Railway".

Boyle also had a strong interest in the welfare of the workers on the tram system, and revolutionised the conditions of service. Working hours were reduced from 70 to 54 per week, and increasing pay and a week's paid holiday made work on the trams a sought after employment. The trams contributed a large sum in relief of rates, and while Boyle made sure that there were always funds to re-invest in the system, other Councillors tended to just see the trams as a milch cow to help keep the rates down. There were some accusations by political opponents that you had to be Irish to get a job on the trams, accusations angrily rejected at a public election meeting in November 1906. That same year he was the only municipal candidate endorsed by the local Trades Council.

In 1906. Boyle was offered the post of managing director of the Manchester District Omnibus Company. The undertaking declared their intention was not to enter into competition with the tramways, but to operate feeder bus services to the tramway system. Nevertheless, to allay any grounds for suspicion, Boyle tendered his resignation as Chairman of the Tramway Committee to the Lord Mayor.

== Political views ==
Boyle operated within two distinct (though connected) political arenas. In England, he identified with the Liberal Party, partly because it was sympathetic to Irish political autonomy, but also because he identified with Liberalism. He was President of the North East Manchester Liberal Association, an Executive Member of the Manchester Liberal Union, and Vice President of New Cross Liberal Club. However, he was on the progressive wing of the party, supporting the municipalisation of essential services, and decent working conditions for council employees. Indeed, on many issues he had more in common with the emerging Independent Labour Party than many members of his own party. On 29 January 1904, the Manchester Guardian quoted him as stating that it was a public duty on the part of both local and central government to relieve distress. Boyle was an advocate of Irish independence, but he believed that Home Rule could be achieved constitutionally through the activities of the Irish National Party in the Imperial Parliament. He aspired towards Ireland obtaining Dominion status within the British Empire.

== The 1910 Election ==
The January 1910 general election produced a result in which the Liberal Party found it necessary to rely upon the support of the Irish Nationalist MPs and the infant Labour Party. This put the Irish Nationalists in a position of influence and almost guaranteed the introduction of a Home Rule Bill. Boyle contested North Mayo and was elected as the Member of Parliament (MP), defeating a Mr. Egan (Independent) after a "lively campaign."

== North American Visit ==
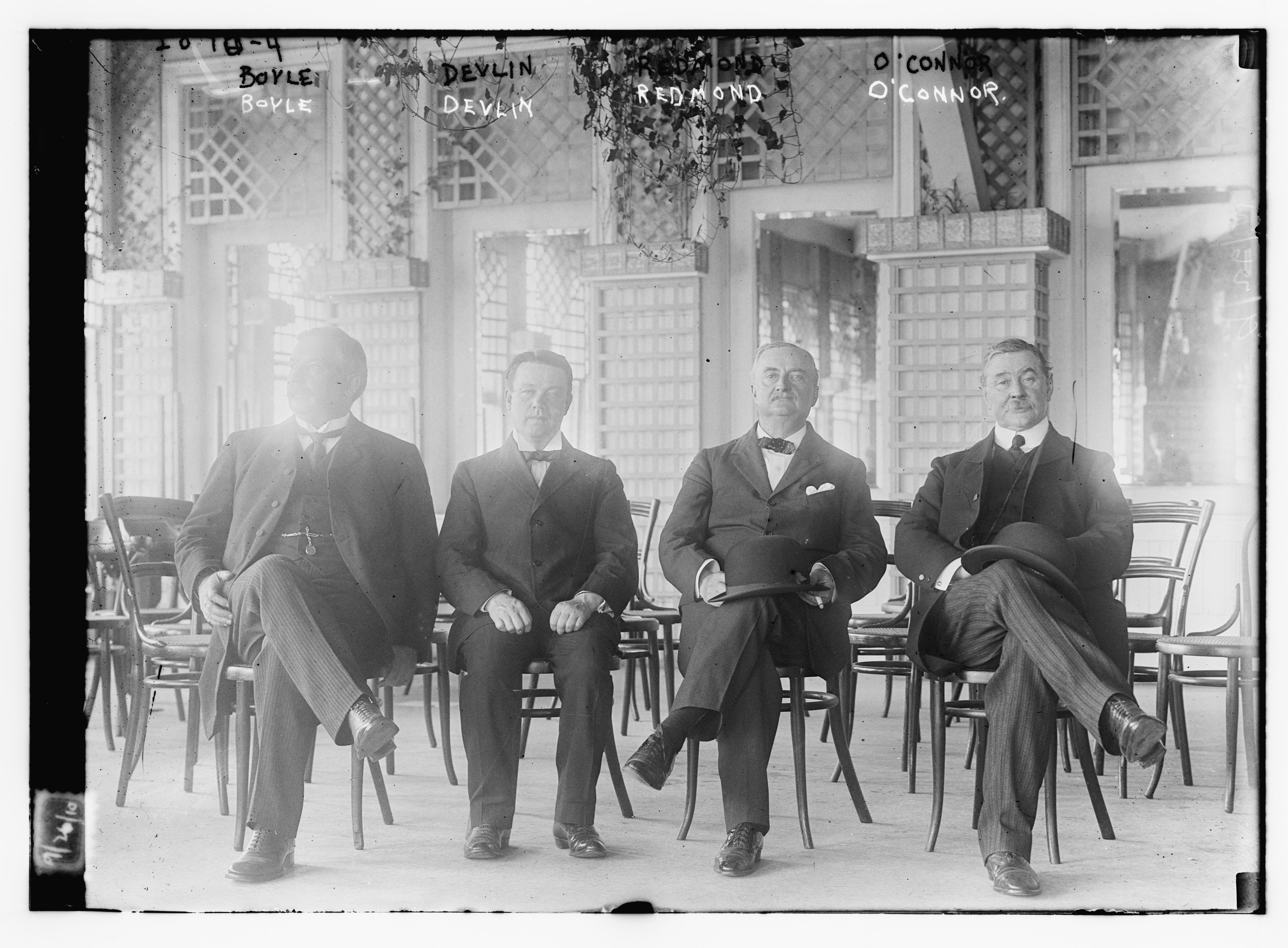
Daniel Boyle, Joe Devlin, John Redmond, and T.P. O'Conner in 1910

On 9 September 1910 the Manchester & Salford District of the United Irish League of Great Britain organised a send off for Dan Boyle, which took place in the Marble Hall, Albion Hotel, Manchester. Boyle was leaving for the United States on what was described as a "mission to the Irish Race of America" in the company of fellow MPs John Redmond, T.P. O’Connor and Joe Devlin. The evening was chaired by Daniel McCabe and the programme consisted of familiar songs ("Ireland A Nation", "Men of the West", "Paddies Evermore" and "the Boys of Wexford"), interspersed by toasts, one of which was made by John Dulanty (later the Irish High Commissioner in London), who described Boyle as "the spearhead of the shaft of the Irish forces in this vicinity". Replying to the toast Dan Boyle said that he looked upon his selection as one of the mission to the United States as a compliment to the Irishmen of Great Britain, who had shown unswerving fidelity to the Irish cause through trying times.

"I believe that this is a period for the rank and file of the party to stand solidly and united behind their leaders, to do the thinking and working out of the plan of campaign. I believe at the present time we have leaders – I do not say merely a leader – who deserve, command, aye and receive a full measure of the confidence of the Irish people, whether in Ireland, in England or America. As a result of the statesmanship and diplomacy that these leaders have shown I believe our cause is nearer accomplishment than it ever was, and as Mr. Redmond recently said at Kilkenny, even the stars in the courses are working for Home Rule."

Boyle and his wife actually set off to Ireland to visit his constituency in North Mayo before joining his companions for the voyage to the United States, where they attended the conference of the National Convention of the United Irish League. The visit was denounced by Sinn Féin.

== Member of Parliament ==
Although a new political career had opened up, he did not neglect his Manchester power base; he was elected an Alderman of the city (with Labour help) in November 1910. While supporting the Irish Nationalists in the division lobby, he generally concerned himself with constituency matters, asking a number of oral questions and putting down questions requiring a written answer. The majority of these related to the Old Age Pension problems of individual constituents and cases arising out of the operation of Irish land reform. His one recorded intervention in a debate was to mount a defence of trade union political levies. (The Liberal government, with Labour Party and Irish support, were determined to reverse the decision enshrined in the infamous Osborne Judgement.) In the course of his speech he referred (though not by name) to his experience with the Manchester Corporation Tramways. In 1912, he was chosen to serve on a House of Commons Select Committee to enquire into the impact of motor buses and similar vehicles upon London street accidents.

Perhaps he considered that extra-parliamentary activities were more to his liking. He addressed meetings in Chorley and Leyland, for example, about the interests of Roman Catholic voters in 1913, and participated in a large meeting in support of Home Rule in Manchester in the same year.

== The First World War ==
John Redmond pledged complete support to Asquith's government at the outbreak of war, even offering the use of the Irish Volunteers in the defence of the country. Boyle, and the majority of the Irish Nationalist M.P.'s, agreed with this position. They argued that the cause was right and just; Belgium was a small country like Ireland, and also Roman Catholic. It was felt that such support in the war would guarantee Home Rule when peace came. On 25 January 1915, Daniel Boyle declared that the Irish were "at one with the Empire." His son in law was gazetted a second lieutenant in the 10th (Pals battalion) Royal Dublin Fusiliers on 22 February 1916, and Boyle placed himself at the head of the Manchester Committee (along with Sir David McCabe) for the Irish Flag Day (in aid of Irish soldiers). However, things were starting to change. On a personal level, he began to base himself more in London, and resigned from Manchester City Council on 8 February 1917. At the national level, the Easter Rising, and the British response to it, changed Irish politics forever. Sinn Féin began to eclipse the Irish National Party, which vainly attempted to preserve its position. Boyle supported the Nationalist candidate in South Armagh election on 28 January 1918, and participated in the Irish Convention in Manchester in October. He clearly realised that he would not hold his own constituency in the post-war election, and rumours circulated that he would contest the Manchester Platting seat. But he withdrew his candidature in both constituencies. His parliamentary career was at an end.

== Later life ==
In addition to political misfortune, Boyle's life after the war was beset by tragedy. He had married, in 1883, Annie Gardiner, the daughter of P. Gardiner of Sligo. His wife later suffered from mental illness (described as "neurasthenia"), and after an attempt to cut her throat, hanged herself on 21 February 1921. Daniel Boyle died suddenly, on 19 August 1925, at Cleveleys Hydro near Blackpool. He was aged 66. Many tributes were paid to him, and he was interred at Kensal Green Cemetery, London, beside his wife.

Parliament of the United Kingdom
Preceded by Conor O'Kelly	Member of Parliament for North Mayo; January 1910 – 1918	Succeeded by John Crowley
