= John Crowley (politician) =

Irish politician (1870–1934)

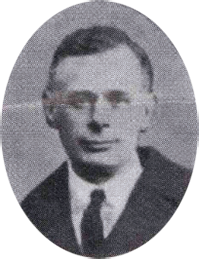
- Crowley in 1922

Teachta Dála
- In office August 1923 – June 1927
- Constituency: Mayo North
- In office May 1921 – August 1923
- Constituency: Mayo North and West
- In office December 1918 – May 1921
- Constituency: Mayo North

Personal details
- Born: 1870 Cork, Ireland
- Died: 1934 (aged 63–64) Ballycastle, County Mayo, Ireland
- Party: Sinn Féin
- Spouse: Julia Larkin
- Children: 5
- Education: University of Glasgow; Royal University of Edinburgh

Military service
- Branch/service: Irish Republican Army

John Crowley (1870–1934) was an Irish Sinn Féin politician and medical practitioner.

== Education and medical career ==
Crowley received his early education in his home town of Cork. He attended the University of Glasgow and the Royal University of Edinburgh in Scotland where he obtained a medical degree. He practised medicine for 33 years, primarily in Ballycastle, County Mayo.

== Political career ==
He was elected as a Sinn Féin MP for the Mayo North constituency at the 1918 general election, defeating incumbent Daniel Boyle of the Irish Party in a landslide of 7,429 to 1,861. In January 1919, Sinn Féin MPs refused to recognise the Parliament of the United Kingdom and instead assembled at the Mansion House in Dublin as a revolutionary parliament called Dáil Éireann.

During the Irish War of Independence he also held the rank of Battalion Commandant in the Irish Republican Army and as a consequence he was a high priority target for the Royal Irish Constabulary and the Black and Tans. On one occasion he was seized upon in the night at his home by crown forces who beat him and threw him into a lorry bound for Ballina. However, mid-journey he was able to jump out and escape into the night while being shot at. Subsequently, he went on the run as he could not return home. For a time he returned to County Cork.

He was elected unopposed as a Sinn Féin Teachta Dála (TD) for the Mayo North and West constituency at the 1921 elections. He opposed the Anglo-Irish Treaty and voted against it, stating:

"I do so because I believe those who elected me as their representative in 1918 are, each and every one, in their hearts Republican, and I believe, also, that if they were given a free choice between the Republic and this treaty they would, without exception, vote for the Republic [...] For the reason as they now clamouring for the ratification of the treaty it would be said of those of us who would be voting against the Partition bill as is said of us now – that we were not carrying out the wishes of our constituents. I can go down to those who are responsible for my election and say to them that I have kept the pledges I made to them and, if they so desire it, they have back the trust placed in me, and I will give it to them without blemish".

He was re-elected unopposed for the same constituency at the 1922 general election, this time as an anti-Treaty Sinn Féin TD, and he did not take his seat in the Dáil. Crowley joined fellow anti-Treaty volunteers in opposing the Free State Government and was held for a time in Ballina Workhouse – to be released with other IRA prisoners when the anti-Treaty IRA briefly seized the town on 12 September 1922. He was elected as a Republican TD for Mayo North constituency at the 1923 general election and once again he did not take his seat. He did not contest the June 1927 general election.

== Personal life ==
Crowley was a practising Roman Catholic. He married Julia Catherine Larkin of Tralee in September 1902. They had five children, four daughters and one son, Finbar, who died at the age of 3.

== Death ==
Crowley died in 1934 at the age of 64. His burial mass was at St. Brigid's Church in Ballycastle and presided over by the Most Rev. Dr. Naughton, Bishop of Killala. In attendance at his funeral were P. J. Ruttledge, the Minister for Justice, then President of Sinn Féin Father Michael O'Flanagan, John J. O'Kelly, and many other politicians in addition to over 1,000 IRA members. He was buried in Doonfeeny Cemetery with his son Finbar.

Parliament of the United Kingdom
Preceded by Daniel Boyle	Member of Parliament for Mayo North; 1918–1922	Constituency abolished
Oireachtas
New constituency	Teachta Dála for Mayo North; 1918–1921	Constituency abolished

Dáil	Election	Deputy (Party)	Deputy (Party)	Deputy (Party)	Deputy (Party)
2nd	1921	Joseph MacBride (SF)	John Crowley (SF)	Thomas Derrig (SF)	P. J. Ruttledge (SF)
3rd	1922	Joseph MacBride (PT-SF)	John Crowley (AT-SF)	Thomas Derrig (AT-SF)	P. J. Ruttledge (AT-SF)
4th	1923	Constituency abolished. See Mayo North and Mayo South			

Dáil	Election	Deputy (Party)	Deputy (Party)	Deputy (Party)	Deputy (Party)
4th	1923	P. J. Ruttledge (Rep)	Henry Coyle (CnaG)	John Crowley (Rep)	Joseph McGrath (CnaG)
4th	1924 by-election	P. J. Ruttledge (Rep)	John Madden (Rep)	John Crowley (Rep)	Joseph McGrath (CnaG)
4th	1925 by-election	P. J. Ruttledge (Rep)	John Madden (Rep)	John Crowley (Rep)	Michael Tierney (CnaG)
5th	1927 (Jun)	P. J. Ruttledge (FF)	John Madden (SF)	Michael Davis (CnaG)	Mark Henry (CnaG)
6th	1927 (Sep)	P. J. Ruttledge (FF)	Micheál Clery (FF)	Michael Davis (CnaG)	Mark Henry (CnaG)
7th	1932	P. J. Ruttledge (FF)	Micheál Clery (FF)	Michael Davis (CnaG)	Patrick O'Hara (CnaG)
8th	1933	P. J. Ruttledge (FF)	Micheál Clery (FF)	Michael Davis (CnaG)	James Morrisroe (CnaG)
9th	1937	P. J. Ruttledge (FF)	John Munnelly (FF)	Patrick Browne (FG)	3 seats 1937–1969
10th	1938	P. J. Ruttledge (FF)	John Munnelly (FF)	Patrick Browne (FG)	3 seats 1937–1969
11th	1943	P. J. Ruttledge (FF)	James Kilroy (FF)	Patrick Browne (FG)	3 seats 1937–1969
12th	1944	P. J. Ruttledge (FF)	James Kilroy (FF)	Patrick Browne (FG)	3 seats 1937–1969
13th	1948	P. J. Ruttledge (FF)	James Kilroy (FF)	Patrick Browne (FG)	3 seats 1937–1969
14th	1951	P. J. Ruttledge (FF)	Thomas O'Hara (CnaT)	Patrick Browne (FG)	3 seats 1937–1969
14th	1952 by-election	Phelim Calleary (FF)	Thomas O'Hara (CnaT)	Patrick Browne (FG)	3 seats 1937–1969
15th	1954	Phelim Calleary (FF)	Thomas O'Hara (CnaT)	Patrick Lindsay (FG)	3 seats 1937–1969
16th	1957	Phelim Calleary (FF)	Seán Doherty (FF)	Patrick Lindsay (FG)	3 seats 1937–1969
17th	1961	Phelim Calleary (FF)	Joseph Lenehan (Ind.)	Michael Browne (FG)	3 seats 1937–1969
18th	1965	Phelim Calleary (FF)	Patrick Lindsay (FG)	Thomas O'Hara (FG)	3 seats 1937–1969
19th	1969	Constituency abolished. See Mayo East and Mayo West			
