= Sinéad Derrig =

- Born: Sinéad Mason; 2 March 1899; Craigaroddan, Ards, County Down, Ireland
- Died: 3 April 1991 (aged 92); Booterstown, Dublin, Ireland
- Known for: Michael Collins' personal secretary
- Spouse: Thomas Derrig
- Children: 2

Sinéad Derrig (Irish: Sinéad Ní Dheirg; 2 March 1899 – 3 April 1991) was an Irish civil servant and Michael Collins' personal secretary, acting as “almost his left hand”.

== Biography ==
Born Sinéad Mason in Craigaroddan, Ards, County Down on 2 March 1899. She was the eldest of eight children of Thomas and Catherine Mason (née Merron). She attended Ballyphilip national school, Ards, moving to Dublin to live with her aunt Jane Mason and attend Holy Faith convent, Haddington Road, Dublin, and later St Michael's Loreto convent, Navan, County Meath. She worked briefly in a firm on Baggot Street as a secretary, going on to work briefly as Éamon de Valera's secretary before his tour of the United States in 1919.

Derrig was Michael Collins personal secretary from 1919 to 1922, working long hours over the course of the Irish War of Independence. During this time, she was privy to confidential information and the dangers that Collins was exposed to. At Collins' arrangement, Derrig lived with her aunt at 23 Brendan Road, Donnybrook. Derrig was close to Collins, leading to many of his relatives and friends believing that he might marry her. After the death of Collins in 1922, she took up a post in the Department of Local Government. She resigned her post in 1928 when she married Thomas Derrig. The Derrig's lived with their two daughters, Úna and Íosold, at 58 Dartmouth Square and 33 Pembroke Road, Dublin.

Derrig refused to give interviews regarding her work with Collins later in life. She died at her home 6 St Helen's Road, Booterstown on 3 April 1991. Shortly before her death, she gifted a copy of a journal by Collins from his time spent in Sligo jail in 1918 to the National Library of Ireland.
