= William Doris =

Irish politician (1860–1926)

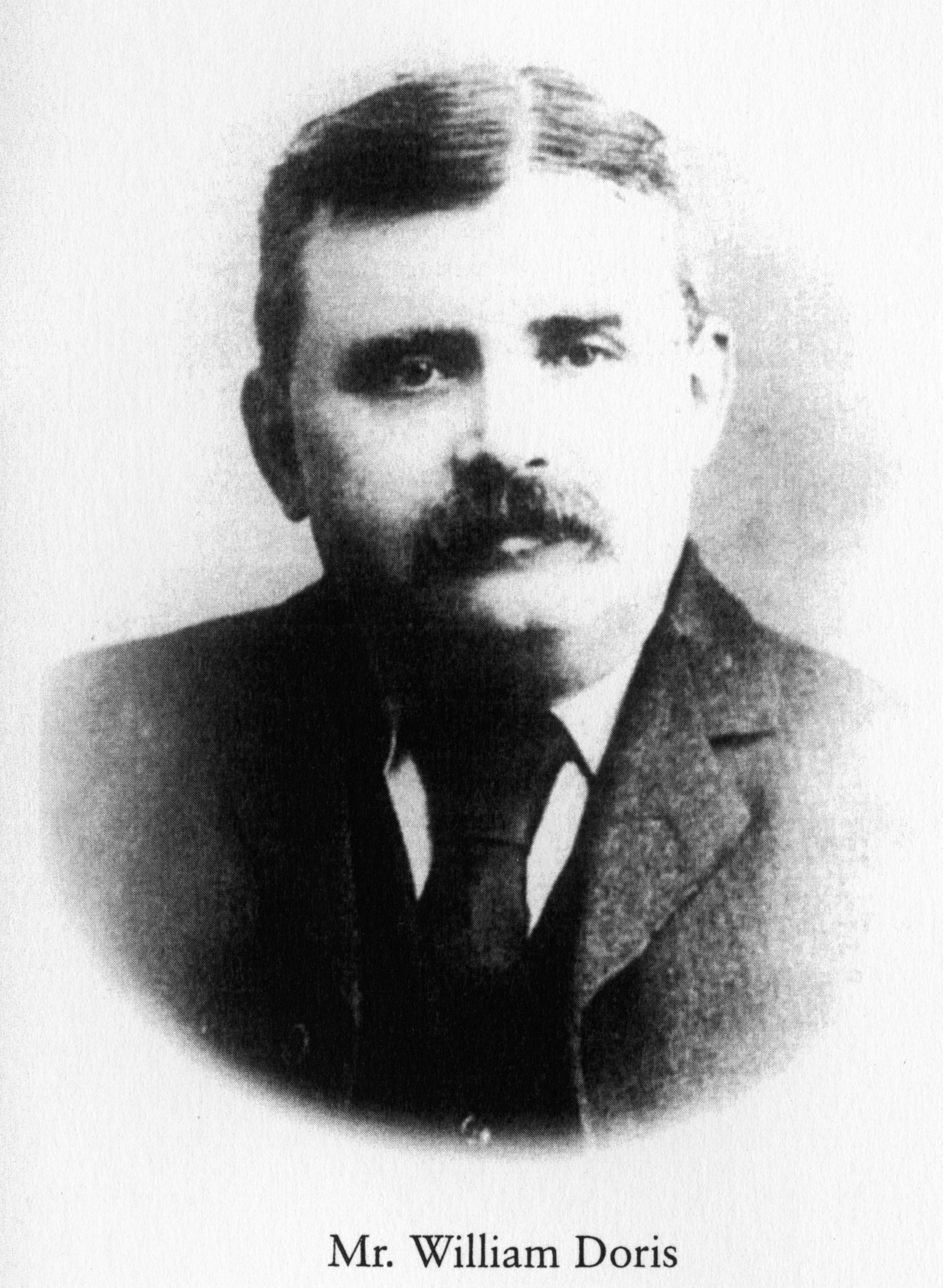

Member of Parliament for West Mayo
- In office 1910–1918
- Preceded by: Robert Ambrose
- Succeeded by: Joseph MacBride

Personal details
- Born: 15 April 1860
- Died: 13 September 1926 (aged 66)

William Doris (15 April 1860 – 13 September 1926) was an Irish politician, Member of Parliament, and co-founder of The Mayo News.

== Biography ==
William Doris was born in Westport, County Mayo on 13 April 1860. He was the son of Robert Doris, a postman, and Margaret Doris (née Madden). He attended a Christian Brothers School and then joined the Connaught Telegraph as a reporter. When the Land League of Mayo was founded in August 1879, he became an honorary secretary. After the foundation of the Irish National Land League in October 1879 he moved to Dublin as a legal secretary in head office. When the league was suppressed in 1881 he was assistant secretary of the underground association and was imprisoned in Dundalk jail in November 1881 for six months. On 3 December 1892 The Mayo News a local newspaper in Mayo, was co-founded by William and his brother Patrick Doris. The price of The Mayo News was one penny.

In 1898, Mayo County Council was set up under the Local Government (Ireland) Act 1898. Doris was chairman of Westport UDC 1899-1910 and vice-chairman of Mayo County Council 1900–08, speaking at the latter's first meeting on 22 April 1899.

== Political career ==
William Doris was a Member of Parliament for the constituency of West Mayo from 15 January 1910 to 14 December 1918 as a member of the Irish Parliamentary Party. His defeat of William O'Brien in West Mayo in 1910 was a decisive defeat for O'Brien's All-for-Ireland League. Like the rest of the Irish Party, William Doris supported the United Kingdom during the First World War, and this led to alienation from his brother Patrick. His own defeat in West Mayo in 1918 is the largest fall in percentage share of vote (65.1%).

Doris was first recorded in the House of Commons of the United Kingdom, Westminster, on 15 March 1910 on the topic of Old Age Pensions (Ireland). He was last recorded in the Commons, on 14 November 1918 under the topic of Evicted Tenants. He was a Whip of the Irish Parliamentary Party under the leadership of John Redmond during this period.

In letters to the Irish Independent in 1924, William Doris wrote a stout defence of the Irish Parliamentary Party in relation to Irish partition. He pointed out that one of the principal consequences of the Sinn Féin policy of refusing to take up seats in the Westminster Parliament was that the establishment of a Protestant-dominated parliament in Northern Ireland in the Government of Ireland Act 1920 went through with little opposition. '...the handing over of the lives and properties, and the social, political, commercial and religious interests of 350,000 Catholics and Nationalists in the North to the tender mercies of an Orange parliament in Belfast has been the direct result of the destruction of the Irish Party in 1918. The 1920 Partition Act was carried because there was nobody to oppose it.' The Independent refused to print Doris's letters in full, and they were therefore printed by his former Parliamentary colleague J. P. Hayden in his newspaper, the Westmeath Examiner, 5 July 1924, under the heading 'The Canker of Partition'.

Parliament of the United Kingdom
| Preceded by Robert Ambrose | Member of Parliament for West Mayo; January 1910 – 1918 | Succeeded by Joseph MacBride |
