= Robert Ambrose (politician) =

Irish politician

Member of Parliament for West Mayo
- In office 1893 – January 1910
- Preceded by: John Deasy
- Succeeded by: William Doris

Personal details
- Born: 1855 Newcastle West, County Limerick, Ireland
- Died: 13 June, 1940 (aged 84–85)

Robert Ambrose (1855 – 13 June 1940) was an Irish politician.

Born in Newcastle West in County Limerick, the son of Michael Ambrose and Eliza Quaide, he was educated at Wier's School and Queen's College, Cork. He qualified as a surgeon and set up a practice in the East End of London. Despite this, he stood in the West Mayo by-election, 1893 for the anti-Parnellite Irish National Federation and was elected, holding his seat in the 1895, 1900 and 1906 general elections. He decided not to stand in January 1910, and instead became involved with the British Labour Party, for which he stood unsuccessfully in Whitechapel and St Georges at the 1918 general election.

Ambrose wrote A Plea for Industrial Regeneration of Ireland, published in 1909. His cousin, Daniel Ambrose, also served as an anti-Parnellite MP. Another first cousin was John Wolfe Ambrose, the man commemorated in the Ambrose Tunnel in New York.

Parliament of the United Kingdom
Preceded by John Deasy	Member of Parliament for West Mayo; 1893 – January 1910	Succeeded by William Doris
