= Conor O'Kelly =

Irish politician (1873-1915)

Member of Parliament for North Mayo
- In office 1900 – January 1910
- Preceded by: William Martin Murphy
- Succeeded by: John O'Donnell

Personal details
- Born: 1873 Claremorris, County Mayo, Ireland
- Died: 13 October 1915 (aged 41–42)
- Party: Irish Parliamentary Party
- Occupation: Politician

Conor O'Kelly (1873 – 13 October 1915) was an Irish Parliamentary Party Member of Parliament.

Born in Claremorris, County Mayo, he became a leading member of the United Irish League and was elected the first chairman of Mayo County Council in 1899. He was dismissed as a Justice of the Peace in 1899 for expressing support for the Boers in the South African War.

In 1900, he was elected Member of Parliament for North Mayo as candidate for the United Irish League, receiving more than twice as many votes as his opponent, industrialist William Martin Murphy, a supporter of the Healyite party.

In December 1905, O'Kelly was accused with two others of pressurising a tenant farmer to give up a farm which he had taken over from another who had been evicted. The defendants were released when the jury could not agree on a verdict. Having held his seat unopposed in 1906, he was re-elected in the local government elections in 1908 despite attacks on him by supporters of the clerical faction.

In the January 1910 general election, he ran in South Mayo against the sitting MP, John O'Donnell, of the All-for-Ireland League, and lost by 441 votes. In the December election that year, O'Kelly was reported to have been considered again as a candidate but rejected because of his differences with the local clergy.

== Notes ==
Parliament of the United Kingdom
Preceded by Daniel Crilly	Member of Parliament for North Mayo; 1900 – January 1910	Succeeded by Daniel Boyle
