= MPs for Ireland in the Protectorate Parliament =

After the Cromwellian conquest of Ireland, the Kingdom of Ireland ceased to operate, and Ireland was governed as part of the Protectorate. The Parliament of Ireland did not meet, and instead, 30 MPs were elected to the Protectorate Parliament in London. The MPs below were preceded by the MPs of the Second Irish House of Commons of Charles I elected in 1639 and succeeded after the Restoration by the MPs of the Irish House of Commons of Charles II elected in 1661.

Constituency	1654	1656	1659
Towns of Bandon and Kinsale	Vincent Gookin	Vincent Gookin	Vincent Gookin
Counties of Carlow, Wexford, Kilkenny, and Queen's County	Thomas Sadler; Daniel Axtell	Thomas Sadler; Daniel Redman	Daniel Redmond; John Brett
Towns of Carrickfergus and Belfast	Major Daniel Redmond	John Davis	John Duckenfield
Counties of Cavan, Fermanagh, and Monaghan	Col. John Cole	Richard Blayney, 4th Baron Blayney	Thomas Coote
County of Cork	Roger Boyle	Roger Boyle (Note: Sat for Edinburgh.)	Sir Maurice Fenton
Towns of Cork and Youghal	Col. William Jephson	Col. William Jephson	Francis Fowlkes
Towns of Derry and Coleraine	Ralph King	Ralph King	Ralph King
Counties of Down, Antrim, and Armagh	Col. Robert Venables; Col. Arthur Hill	Col. Thomas Cooper; Lt-Col James Trayle	Sir John Skeffington, Bt; George Rawden
City of Dublin	Alderman Daniel Hutchinson	Richard Tighe	Arthur Annesley
County of Dublin	Col. John Hewson	John Bysse	Sir Theophilus Jones
Counties of Galway and Mayo	Sir Charles Coote; John Reynolds	Sir Charles Coote; Lt Col John Brett	Sir Charles Coote; Col. Thomas Sadler
Counties of Kerry, Limerick, and Clare	Major Gen. Sir Hardress Waller; Col. Henry Ingoldsby	Major Gen. Sir Hardress Waller; Col. Henry Ingoldsby	Major Gen. Sir Hardress Waller; Col. Henry Ingoldsby
Counties of Kildare and Wicklow	Maj. Anthony Morgan; Maj. William Meredith	Sir Hardress Waller; Anthony Morgan	Dudley Loftus; Henry Markham
City and County of the City of Limerick and Kilmallock	William Purefoy	Walter Waller	George Ingoldsby
Counties of Londonderry, Donegal, and Tyrone	Col. John Clark; Thomas Newburgh	Tristram Beresford; Thomas Newburgh	Col. John Gorges; Alexander Staples
Counties of Meath and Louth	Col. John Fowk, Governor of Drogheda; Major William Cadogan	Col. John Fowk, Governor of Drogheda; Sir William Aston	Sir Anthony Morgan; William Aston
Counties of Sligo, Roscommon, and Leitrim	Sir Robert King; Sir John Temple	Sir Robert King; John Bridges	Robert Parke; Thomas Waller
Counties of Tipperary and Waterford	John Reynolds; Jerome Sankey	John Reynolds, Commissary-General; Daniel Abbot	Sir Jerome Sankey; Thomas Stanley
Cities of Waterford and Clonmel	William Halsey	William Halsey	William Halsey
Counties of Westmeath, Longford, and King's County	Theophilus Jones; Thomas Scot	Theophilus Jones; Maj. Henry Owen	Francis Aungier, 1st Earl of Longford; Sir Henry Piers
