= John Deasy (UK MP) =

British politician

John Deasy (1856 – 24 February 1896) was an Irish nationalist politician whose career ended in scandal after nine years as a Member of Parliament (MP).

== Political career ==
He was first elected to the United Kingdom House of Commons as an Irish Parliamentary Party (IPP) MP for Cork City, taking the seat at a by-election on 23 February 1884 after the resignation of John Daly.

At the 1885 general election, he stood in the new West Mayo constituency, winning the seat by an overwhelming majority (of 4,790 to 131 votes) over his sole opponent, a candidate of the Irish Conservative Party. He was re-elected unopposed at the 1886 general election. When the party split on the leadership of Charles Stewart Parnell in 1891, he joined the majority Anti-Parnellite Irish National Federation. He was returned with a large majority at the 1892 general election.

== Downfall ==
Deasy's career ended in scandal. In July 1893, he was tried at the London County Sessions, on a charge of indecent assault against Ellen Lewis, a teenage servant employed at his London lodgings in 75, Warwick-street. Lewis testified that Deasy had pulled her onto the bed and tried to kiss her, but was interrupted by her employer, Mrs Kate Edith Postlethwaite (the landlady, who also gave evidence). Deasy told the court that Lewis had tripped and fallen onto the bed, and that he was helping her get up, but had offered to kiss her. Evidence of Deasy's character was offered by two MPs (Sir Thomas Grattan Esmonde and Justin McCarthy), and by Sir George Penrose, the former High Sheriff and Lord Mayor of Cork. The jury found Deasy not guilty of indecent assault, but guilty of common assault. He was ordered to pay a fine of £25 and costs.

On 17 July 1893, a few days after the completion of his trial, Deasy resigned his seat by becoming Steward of the Manor of Northstead.

== Death ==
He died of tuberculosis in February 1896, aged 39.

Parliament of the United Kingdom
Preceded by John Daly; Charles Stewart Parnell	Member of Parliament for Cork City; 1884 – 1885; With: Charles Stewart Parnell	Succeeded by Maurice Healy; Charles Stewart Parnell
New constituency	Member of Parliament for West Mayo; 1885 – 1893	Succeeded by Robert Ambrose
