= Mayo North and West =

Dáil constituency (1921–1923)

- Former Dáil constituency
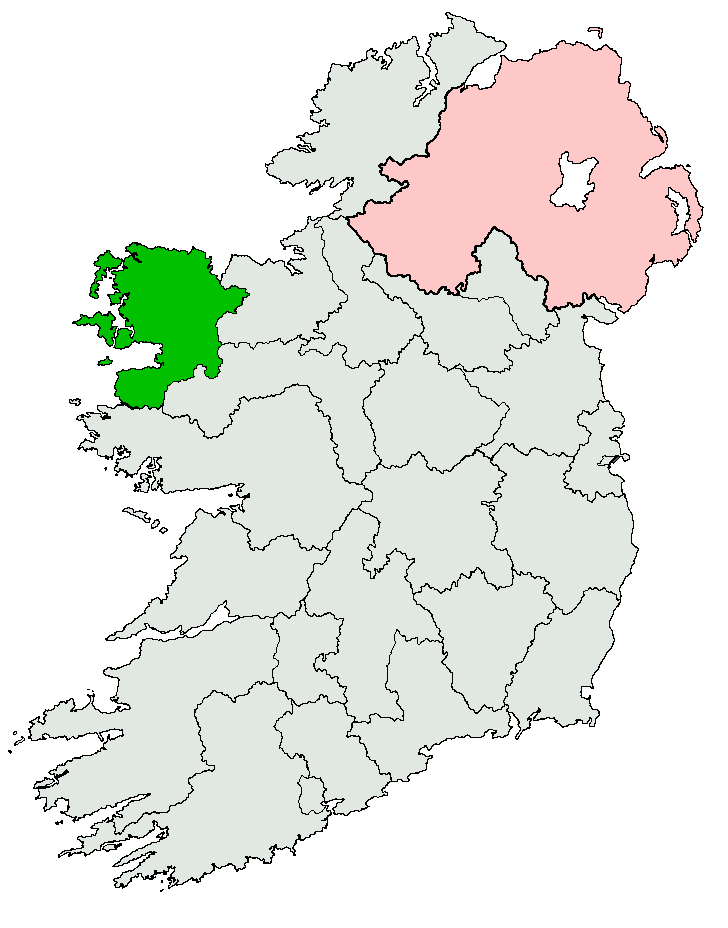
- Location of Mayo North and West within Ireland

Former constituency
- Created: 1921
- Abolished: 1923
- Seats: 4
- Local government area: County Mayo
- Created from: North Mayo; West Mayo
- Replaced by: Mayo North; Mayo South

Mayo North and West was a parliamentary constituency represented in Dáil Éireann, the lower house of the Irish parliament or Oireachtas from 1921 to 1923. The constituency elected 4 deputies (Teachtaí Dála, commonly known as TDs) to the Dáil, on the system of proportional representation by means of the single transferable vote (PR-STV).

== History and boundaries ==
Mayo North and West was created under the Government of Ireland Act 1920 as a 4-seat constituency, for the 1921 general election to the House of Commons of Southern Ireland, whose members formed the Second Dáil. It covered the northern and western parts of County Mayo.

It succeeded the constituencies of North Mayo and East Mayo which were used to elect the members of the 1st Dáil and earlier UK House of Commons members.

It was abolished under the Electoral Act 1923, when it was replaced by the new Mayo North and Mayo South constituencies. The new constituencies were first used in the 1923 general election for the 4th Dáil.

== TDs ==
Teachtaí Dála (TDs) for Mayo North and West 1921–1923
Key to parties: SF = Sinn Féin; AT-SF = Sinn Féin (Anti-Treaty); PT-SF = Sinn Féin (Pro-Treaty)
Dáil	Election	Deputy (Party)	Deputy (Party)	Deputy (Party)	Deputy (Party)
2nd	1921	Joseph MacBride (SF)	John Crowley (SF)	Thomas Derrig (SF)	P. J. Ruttledge (SF)
3rd	1922	Joseph MacBride (PT-SF)	John Crowley (AT-SF)	Thomas Derrig (AT-SF)	P. J. Ruttledge (AT-SF)
4th	1923	Constituency abolished. See Mayo North and Mayo South			

Note: The columns in this table are used only for presentational purposes, and no significance should be attached to the order of columns. For details of the order in which seats were won at each election, see the detailed results of that election.

== Elections ==
*: Outgoing TD

=== 1922 general election ===
1922 general election: Mayo North and West (uncontested)
Party	Candidate
Sinn Féin (Anti-Treaty)	John Crowley
Sinn Féin (Anti-Treaty)	Thomas Derrig
Sinn Féin (Pro-Treaty)	Joseph MacBride
Sinn Féin (Anti-Treaty)	P. J. Ruttledge
Electorate: 46,977

=== 1921 general election ===
1921 general election: Mayo North and West (uncontested)
Party	Candidate
Sinn Féin	John Crowley
Sinn Féin	Thomas Derrig
Sinn Féin	Joseph MacBride
Sinn Féin	P. J. Ruttledge

== See also ==
- Dáil constituencies
- Politics of the Republic of Ireland
- Historic Dáil constituencies
- Elections in the Republic of Ireland
