= Joseph MacBride =

Irish politician (1860–1938)

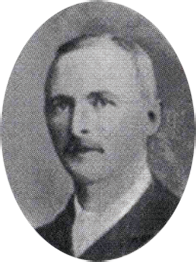
- MacBride, c.1910s

Teachta Dála
- In office August 1923 – June 1927
- Constituency: Mayo South
- In office May 1921 – August 1923
- Constituency: Mayo North and West
- In office December 1918 – May 1921
- Constituency: Mayo West

Personal details
- Born: 1860 County Mayo, Ireland
- Died: 1 January 1938 (aged 77–78)
- Party: Sinn Féin; Cumann na nGaedheal

Joseph MacBride (1860 – 1 January 1938) was an Irish Sinn Féin and later Cumann na nGaedheal politician. He was a member of the Irish Volunteers. His brother Major John MacBride fought in the 1916 Easter Rising and was executed by the British authorities. Joseph was arrested after the Rising and interned in prison in England and Wales.

He was elected as a Sinn Féin MP for the Mayo West constituency at the 1918 general election. In January 1919, Sinn Féin MPs refused to recognise the Parliament of the United Kingdom and instead assembled at the Mansion House in Dublin as a revolutionary parliament called Dáil Éireann, though MacBride did not attend as he was in prison.

He was re-elected unopposed at the 1921 elections for the Mayo North and West constituency. He supported the Anglo-Irish Treaty and voted for it. He was again re-elected unopposed at the 1922 general election as a member of Pro-Treaty Sinn Féin. He joined Cumann na nGaedheal along with other pro-Treaty Sinn Féin TDs in 1923, and was elected at the 1923 general election for Mayo South. He lost his seat at the June 1927 general election and retired from politics.

His nephew Seán MacBride was subsequently Chief of Staff of the IRA and a founder of Clann na Poblachta and a government minister.

== See also ==
- Families in the Oireachtas

Parliament of the United Kingdom
Preceded by William Doris	Member of Parliament for Mayo West; 1918–1922	Constituency abolished
Oireachtas
New constituency	Teachta Dála for Mayo West; 1918–1921	Constituency abolished

Dáil	Election	Deputy (Party)	Deputy (Party)	Deputy (Party)	Deputy (Party)
2nd	1921	Joseph MacBride (SF)	John Crowley (SF)	Thomas Derrig (SF)	P. J. Ruttledge (SF)
3rd	1922	Joseph MacBride (PT-SF)	John Crowley (AT-SF)	Thomas Derrig (AT-SF)	P. J. Ruttledge (AT-SF)
4th	1923	Constituency abolished. See Mayo North and Mayo South			

Dáil	Election	Deputy (Party)	Deputy (Party)	Deputy (Party)	Deputy (Party)	Deputy (Party)
4th	1923	Tom Maguire (Rep)	Michael Kilroy (Rep)	William Sears (CnaG)	Joseph MacBride (CnaG)	Martin Nally (CnaG)
5th	1927 (Jun)	Thomas J. O'Connell (Lab)	Michael Kilroy (FF)	Eugene Mullen (FF)	James FitzGerald-Kenney (CnaG)	Martin Nally (CnaG)
6th	1927 (Sep)	Thomas J. O'Connell (Lab)	Michael Kilroy (FF)	Richard Walsh (FF)	James FitzGerald-Kenney (CnaG)	Martin Nally (CnaG)
7th	1932	Edward Moane (FF)	Michael Kilroy (FF)	Richard Walsh (FF)	James FitzGerald-Kenney (CnaG)	Martin Nally (CnaG)
8th	1933	Edward Moane (FF)	Michael Kilroy (FF)	Richard Walsh (FF)	James FitzGerald-Kenney (CnaG)	Martin Nally (CnaG)
9th	1937	Edward Moane (FF)	Micheál Clery (FF)	Richard Walsh (FF)	James FitzGerald-Kenney (FG)	Martin Nally (FG)
10th	1938	Mícheál Ó Móráin (FF)	Micheál Clery (FF)	Richard Walsh (FF)	James FitzGerald-Kenney (FG)	Martin Nally (FG)
11th	1943	Mícheál Ó Móráin (FF)	Micheál Clery (FF)	Joseph Blowick (CnaT)	James FitzGerald-Kenney (FG)	Dominick Cafferky (CnaT)
12th	1944	Mícheál Ó Móráin (FF)	Micheál Clery (FF)	Joseph Blowick (CnaT)	Richard Walsh (FF)	Dominick Cafferky (CnaT)
12th	1945 by-election	Mícheál Ó Móráin (FF)	Bernard Commons (CnaT)	Joseph Blowick (CnaT)	Richard Walsh (FF)	Dominick Cafferky (CnaT)
13th	1948	Mícheál Ó Móráin (FF)	Bernard Commons (CnaT)	Joseph Blowick (CnaT)	Richard Walsh (FF)	4 seats 1948–1969
14th	1951	Mícheál Ó Móráin (FF)	Seán Flanagan (FF)	Joseph Blowick (CnaT)	Dominick Cafferky (CnaT)	4 seats 1948–1969
15th	1954	Mícheál Ó Móráin (FF)	Seán Flanagan (FF)	Joseph Blowick (CnaT)	Henry Kenny (FG)	4 seats 1948–1969
16th	1957	Mícheál Ó Móráin (FF)	Seán Flanagan (FF)	Joseph Blowick (CnaT)	Henry Kenny (FG)	4 seats 1948–1969
17th	1961	Mícheál Ó Móráin (FF)	Seán Flanagan (FF)	Joseph Blowick (CnaT)	Henry Kenny (FG)	4 seats 1948–1969
18th	1965	Mícheál Ó Móráin (FF)	Seán Flanagan (FF)	Michael Lyons (FG)	Henry Kenny (FG)	4 seats 1948–1969
19th	1969	Constituency abolished. See Mayo East and Mayo West				
