= West Mayo (UK Parliament constituency) =

Former parliamentary constituency in the United Kingdom

- Former county constituency for the House of Commons

1885–1922
- Seats: 1
- Created from: County Mayo
- Replaced by: Mayo North and West

West Mayo was a parliamentary constituency in Ireland, which returned one Member of Parliament (MP) to the House of Commons of the Parliament of the United Kingdom, elected on a system of first-past-the-post, from 1885 to 1922.

Prior to the 1885 general election the area was part of the two-seat County Mayo constituency. From 1922, on the establishment of the Irish Free State, it was not represented in the UK Parliament.

== Boundaries ==
This constituency comprised the western part of County Mayo.

1885–1922: The baronies of Burrishoole and Murrisk, and that part of the barony of Carra not contained within the constituency of South Mayo.

== Members of Parliament ==
Years	Member	Party
1885–1890	John Deasy	Irish Parliamentary Party
1891–1893	John Deasy	Irish National Federation
1893–1900	Robert Ambrose	Irish National Federation
1900–1910	Robert Ambrose	Irish Parliamentary Party
1910–1918	William Doris	Irish Parliamentary Party
1918–1922	Joseph MacBride	Sinn Féin

== Elections ==
=== Elections in the 1880s ===
1885 general election: West Mayo
Party	Candidate	Votes	%	±%
Irish Parliamentary	John Deasy	4,790	97.3	
Irish Conservative	Robert Vesey Stoney	131	2.7	
Majority		4,659	94.6	
Turnout		4,921	61.4	
Registered electors		8,009		
Irish Parliamentary win (new seat)				

1886 general election: West Mayo
Party	Candidate	Votes	%	±%
Irish Parliamentary	John Deasy	Unopposed		
Registered electors		8,009		
Irish Parliamentary hold				

=== Elections in the 1890s ===
1892 general election: West Mayo
Party	Candidate	Votes	%	±%
Irish National Federation	John Deasy	3,456	85.0	N/A
Ind. Nationalist	John O'Connor Power	611	15.0	New
Majority		2,845	70.0	N/A
Turnout		4,067	38.2	N/A
Registered electors		10,644		
Irish National Federation gain from Irish Parliamentary		Swing	N/A	

Deasy resigns, causing a by-election.

By-election, 1893: West Mayo
Party	Candidate	Votes	%	±%
Irish National Federation	Robert Ambrose	Unopposed		
Registered electors		11,262		
Irish National Federation hold				

1895 general election: West Mayo
Party	Candidate	Votes	%	±%
Irish National Federation	Robert Ambrose	Unopposed		
Registered electors		10,900		
Irish National Federation hold				

=== Elections in the 1900s ===
1900 general election: West Mayo
Party	Candidate	Votes	%	±%
Irish Parliamentary	Robert Ambrose	Unopposed		
Registered electors		9,436		
Irish Parliamentary hold				

1906 general election: West Mayo
Party	Candidate	Votes	%	±%
Irish Parliamentary	Robert Ambrose	Unopposed		
Registered electors		8,941		
Irish Parliamentary hold				

=== Elections in the 1910s ===
January 1910 general election: West Mayo
Party	Candidate	Votes	%	±%
Irish Parliamentary	William Doris	Unopposed		
Registered electors		9,436		
Irish Parliamentary hold				

December 1910 general election: West Mayo
Party	Candidate	Votes	%	±%
Irish Parliamentary	William Doris	3,931	78.4	N/A
All-for-Ireland	William O'Brien	1,082	21.6	N/A
Majority		2,849	56.8	N/A
Turnout		5,013	60.7	N/A
Registered electors		8,261		
Irish Parliamentary hold		Swing	N/A	

1918 general election: West Mayo
Party	Candidate	Votes	%	±%
Sinn Féin	Joseph MacBride	10,195	86.7	New
Irish Parliamentary	William Doris	1,568	13.3	−65.1
Majority		8,627	73.4	New
Turnout		11,763	54.3	−6.4
Registered electors		21,667		
Sinn Féin gain from Irish Parliamentary		Swing	+75.9	

The 65.1% drop in the Irish Parliamentary Party vote is the largest decrease in a party's vote between successive House of Commons elections in a single constituency. Between elections, the First World War and Easter Rising had changed the political landscape, and the Representation of the People Act 1918 had greatly increased the electorate.
