= North Mayo (UK Parliament constituency) =

Former parliamentary constituency in the United Kingdom

- Former county constituency for the House of Commons

1885–1922
- Seats: 1
- Created from: County Mayo
- Replaced by: Mayo North and West

North Mayo was a parliamentary constituency in Ireland, which returned one Member of Parliament (MP) to the House of Commons of the Parliament of the United Kingdom, elected on a system of first-past-the-post, from 1885 to 1922.

Prior to the 1885 general election the area was part of the two-seat County Mayo constituency. From 1922, on the establishment of the Irish Free State, it was not represented in the UK Parliament.

== Boundaries ==
This constituency comprised the northern part of County Mayo.

1885–1922: The baronies of Erris and Tirawley, and that part of the barony of Gallen contained within the parishes of Attymass and Kilgarvan.

== Members of Parliament ==
Years	Member	Party
1885–1890	Daniel Crilly	Irish Parliamentary Party
1891–1900	Daniel Crilly	Irish National Federation
1900–1910	Conor O'Kelly	Irish Parliamentary Party
1910–1918	Daniel Boyle	Irish Parliamentary Party
1918–1922	John Crowley	Sinn Féin

== Elections ==
=== Elections in the 1880s ===
1885 general election: North Mayo
Party	Candidate	Votes	%	±%
Irish Parliamentary	Daniel Crilly	Unopposed		
Registered electors		7,413		
Irish Parliamentary win (new seat)				

1886 general election: North Mayo
Party	Candidate	Votes	%	±%
Irish Parliamentary	Daniel Crilly	Unopposed		
Registered electors		7,413		
Irish Parliamentary hold				

=== Elections in the 1890s ===
1892 general election: North Mayo
Party	Candidate	Votes	%	±%
Irish National Federation	Daniel Crilly	2,201	61.2	N/A
Irish National League	Bernard Egan	1,397	38.8	N/A
Majority		804	22.4	N/A
Turnout		3,598	52.4	N/A
Registered electors		6,860		
Irish National Federation gain from Irish Parliamentary		Swing	N/A	

1895 general election: North Mayo
Party	Candidate	Votes	%	±%
Irish National Federation	Daniel Crilly	1,937	59.5	−1.7
Irish National League	Bernard Egan	1,316	40.5	+1.7
Majority		621	19.0	−3.4
Turnout		3,253	46.3	−6.1
Registered electors		7,029		
Irish National Federation hold		Swing	−1.7	

=== Elections in the 1900s ===
1900 general election: North Mayo
Party	Candidate	Votes	%	±%
Irish Parliamentary	Conor O'Kelly	2,504	69.2	+28.7
Healyite Nationalist	William Martin Murphy	1,116	30.8	−28.7
Majority		1,388	38.4	+19.4
Turnout		3,620	47.1	+0.8
Registered electors		7,686		
Irish Parliamentary hold		Swing		

1906 general election: North Mayo
Party	Candidate	Votes	%	±%
Irish Parliamentary	Conor O'Kelly	Unopposed		
Registered electors		7,027		
Irish Parliamentary hold				

=== Elections in the 1910s ===
January 1910 general election: North Mayo
Party	Candidate	Votes	%	±%
Irish Parliamentary	Daniel Boyle	1,861	50.5	N/A
Ind. Nationalist	Bernard Egan	1,821	49.5	New
Majority		40	1.0	N/A
Turnout		3,682	52.8	N/A
Registered electors		6,977		
Irish Parliamentary hold		Swing	N/A	

December 1910 general election: North Mayo
Party	Candidate	Votes	%	±%
Irish Parliamentary	Daniel Boyle	Unopposed		
Registered electors		6,977		
Irish Parliamentary hold				

1918 general election: North Mayo
Party	Candidate	Votes	%	±%
Sinn Féin	John Crowley	7,429	80.8	New
Irish Parliamentary	Daniel Boyle	1,761	19.2	N/A
Majority		5,668	61.6	N/A
Turnout		9,190	43.3	N/A
Registered electors		21,212		
Sinn Féin gain from Irish Parliamentary		Swing	N/A	
