= Historic Dáil constituencies =

Dáil constituencies since 1918

This page lists Dáil constituencies that have been used for elections to Dáil Éireann from the 1918 election to the 2024 general election.

== Overview of legislation and seat distribution ==
In the case of the First Dáil, the constituencies used were those created for the House of Commons of the United Kingdom.

In the case of the Second Dáil, the constituencies were created for the Northern Ireland House of Commons and the House of Commons of Southern Ireland. Although only Sinn Féin members took their seats as TDs in the revolutionary period of Dáil Éireann, MPs from other parties were invited; on this basis, all constituencies used in 1918 and 1921 are included in this list of Dáil constituencies.

From the Fourth Dáil on, constituencies were adjusted by Irish legislation.

Both geographical districts and university constituencies are listed in the table below.

Alterations to constituencies take effect on the dissolution of the Dáil sitting when a revision is made; therefore, any by-elections take place according to the constituency boundaries in place at the previous election.

| Period | Legislation | ×1 | ×2 | ×3 | ×4 | ×5 | ×6 | ×7 | ×8 | ×9 | Total C | Total TDs | Elections |
|---|---|---|---|---|---|---|---|---|---|---|---|---|---|
| 1918–1921 | Redistribution of Seats (Ireland) Act 1918 | 101 | 2 | | | | | | | | 103 | 105 | 1918 |
| 1921–1922 | Government of Ireland Act 1920 | | | 3 | 22 | 5 | 2 | 2 | 4 | | 38 | 180 | 1921 |
| 1922–1923 | Government of Ireland Act 1920 | | | 3 | 16 | 4 | 2 | 1 | 2 | | 28 | 128 | 1922 |
| 1923–1937 | Electoral Act 1923 | | | 8 | 4 | 9 | | 5 | 3 | 1 | 30 | 153 | 1923, June 1927, Sept. 1927, 1932, 1933 |
| 1937–1948 | Electoral (Revision of Constituencies) Act 1935 | | | 15 | 8 | 8 | | 3 | | | 34 | 138 (Note: Reduction in 1937 also effected by the removal of the 6 seats in the university constituencies under the Constitution (Amendment No. 23) Act 1936 and the Electoral (University Constituencies) Act 1936.) | 1937, 1938, 1943, 1944 |
| 1948–1961 | Electoral (Amendment) Act 1947 | | | 22 | 9 | 9 | | | | | 40 | 147 | 1948, 1951, 1954, 1957 |
| 1961–1969 | Electoral (Amendment) Act 1961 | | | 17 | 12 | 9 | | | | | 38 | 144 | 1961, 1965 |
| 1969–1977 | Electoral (Amendment) Act 1969 | | | 26 | 14 | 2 | | | | | 42 | 144 | 1969, 1973 |
| 1977–1981 | Electoral (Amendment) Act 1974 | | | 26 | 10 | 6 | | | | | 42 | 148 | 1977 |
| 1981–1987 | Electoral (Amendment) Act 1980 | | | 13 | 13 | 15 | | | | | 41 | 166 | 1981, Feb. 1982, Nov. 1982 |
| 1987–1992 | Electoral (Amendment) Act 1983 | | | 13 | 13 | 15 | | | | | 41 | 166 | 1987, 1989 |
| 1992–1997 | Electoral (Amendment) Act 1990 | | | 12 | 15 | 14 | | | | | 41 | 166 | 1992 |
| 1997–2002 | Electoral (Amendment) Act 1995 | | | 12 | 15 | 14 | | | | | 41 | 166 | 1997 |
| 2002–2007 | Electoral (Amendment) (No. 2) Act 1998 | | | 16 | 12 | 14 | | | | | 42 | 166 | 2002 |
| 2007–2011 | Electoral (Amendment) Act 2005 | | | 18 | 13 | 12 | | | | | 43 | 166 | 2007 |
| 2011–2016 | Electoral (Amendment) Act 2009 | | | 17 | 15 | 11 | | | | | 43 | 166 | 2011 |
| 2016–2020 | Electoral (Amendment) (Dáil Constituencies) Act 2013 | | | 13 | 16 | 11 | | | | | 40 | 158 | 2016 |
| 2020–2024 | Electoral (Amendment) (Dáil Constituencies) Act 2017 | | | 9 | 17 | 13 | | | | | 39 | 160 | 2020 |
| 2024–date | Electoral (Amendment) Act 2023 | | | 13 | 15 | 15 | | | | | 43 | 174 | 2024 |

== List of constituencies ==
Notes

- Constituencies which include all or part of two or more counties are attributed to the first county mentioned in the constituency name or (if none) the predominant county.
- Constituency names are based upon those used in the Oireachtas database of former members, except that borough division names in 1918 and 1977 are not placed in brackets. These names are sometimes not identical to those used in electoral legislation, i.e. compass points always follow the county or borough name in the database.
- In Irish legislation up to 1961, constituencies in the cities of Cork and Dublin (then known as county boroughs) were designated as borough constituencies. The official designation of borough and county constituencies under Irish electoral law ended in 1969. In UK legislation, relevant for the constituencies of the First and Second Dáil, it was also used to designate Belfast, Limerick, Londonderry and Waterford in 1918, and Belfast in 1921.

| Constituency | County or city | Created | Abolished | Seats |
|---|---|---|---|---|
| Antrim | Antrim | 1921 | 1922 | 7 |
| Antrim East | Antrim | 1918 | 1921 | 1 |
| Antrim Mid | Antrim | 1918 | 1921 | 1 |
| Antrim North | Antrim | 1918 | 1921 | 1 |
| Antrim South | Antrim | 1918 | 1921 | 1 |
| Armagh | Armagh | 1921 | 1922 | 4 |
| Armagh Mid | Armagh | 1918 | 1921 | 1 |
| Armagh North | Armagh | 1918 | 1921 | 1 |
| Armagh South | Armagh | 1918 | 1921 | 1 |
| Athlone–Longford | Westmeath / Longford | 1937 | 1948 | 3 |
| Belfast Cromac | Belfast | 1918 | 1921 | 1 |
| Belfast Duncairn | Belfast | 1918 | 1921 | 1 |
| Belfast East | Belfast | 1921 | 1922 | 4 |
| Belfast Falls | Belfast | 1918 | 1921 | 1 |
| Belfast North | Belfast | 1921 | 1922 | 4 |
| Belfast Ormeau | Belfast | 1918 | 1921 | 1 |
| Belfast Pottinger | Belfast | 1918 | 1921 | 1 |
| Belfast Shankill | Belfast | 1918 | 1921 | 1 |
| Belfast South | Belfast | 1921 | 1922 | 4 |
| Belfast St. Anne's | Belfast | 1918 | 1921 | 1 |
| Belfast Victoria | Belfast | 1918 | 1921 | 1 |
| Belfast West | Belfast | 1921 | 1922 | 4 |
| Belfast Woodvale | Belfast | 1918 | 1921 | 1 |
| County Carlow | Carlow | 1918 | 1921 | 1 |
| Carlow–Kildare | Carlow / Kildare | 1937 | 1948 | 4 |
| Carlow–Kilkenny (Note: Seats figures from 1921 and 1923. Carlow–Kilkenny; Donegal; Dublin South; Galway; Leix–Offaly; Longford–Westmeath.) | Carlow / Kilkenny | 1921 | 1937 | 4,5 |
| Carlow–Kilkenny | Carlow / Kilkenny | 1948 | | 5 |
| Cavan (Note: Seats figures from 1921, 1923 and 1961.) | Cavan | 1921 | 1977 | 3,4,3 |
| Cavan East | Cavan | 1918 | 1921 | 1 |
| Cavan–Monaghan (Note: Seats figures from 1977, 2016 and 2020.) | Cavan / Monaghan | 1977 | | 5,4,5 |
| Cavan West | Cavan | 1918 | 1921 | 1 |
| Clare (Note: Seats figures from 1921, 1923, 1948, 1969 and 1981.) | Clare | 1921 | | 4,5,4,3,4 |
| Clare East | Clare | 1918 | 1921 | 1 |
| Clare–South Galway | Clare / Galway | 1969 | 1977 | 3 |
| Clare West | Clare | 1918 | 1921 | 1 |
| Cork Borough (Note: Seats figures from 1921, 1923, 1937 and 1948.) | Cork city | 1921 | 1969 | 4,5,4,5 |
| Cork City | Cork city | 1918 | 1921 | 2 |
| Cork City | Cork city | 1977 | 1981 | 5 |
| Cork City North-West | Cork city | 1969 | 1977 | 3 |
| Cork City South-East | Cork city | 1969 | 1977 | 3 |
| Cork East | Cork | 1918 | 1921 | 1 |
| Cork East | Cork | 1923 | 1937 | 5 |
| Cork East | Cork | 1948 | 1961 | 3 |
| Cork East | Cork | 1981 | | 4 |
| Cork East and North East | Cork | 1921 | 1923 | 3 |
| Cork Mid | Cork | 1918 | 1921 | 1 |
| Cork Mid (Note: Seats figures from 1961 and 1977.) | Cork | 1961 | 1981 | 4,5 |
| Cork Mid, North, South, South East and West | Cork | 1921 | 1923 | 8 |
| Cork North | Cork | 1918 | 1921 | 1 |
| Cork North (Note: Seats figures from 1923, 1937 and 1948. Cork North; Roscommon.) | Cork | 1923 | 1961 | 3,4,3 |
| Cork North-Central (Note: Seats figures from 1981 and 2007.) | Cork city | 1981 | | 5,4 |
| Cork North East | Cork | 1918 | 1921 | 1 |
| Cork North-East (Note: Seats figures from 1961 and 1969.) | Cork | 1961 | 1981 | 5,4 |
| Cork North-West | Cork | 1981 | | 3 |
| Cork South | Cork | 1918 | 1921 | 1 |
| Cork South | Cork | 1948 | 1961 | 3 |
| Cork South-Central (Note: Seats figures from 1981 and 2016.) | Cork city | 1981 | | 5,4 |
| Cork South East | Cork | 1918 | 1921 | 1 |
| Cork South-East | Cork | 1937 | 1948 | 3 |
| Cork South-West | Cork | 1961 | | 3 |
| Cork West | Cork | 1918 | 1921 | 1 |
| Cork West (Note: Seats figures from 1923 and 1948. Cork West; Mayo South.) | Cork | 1923 | 1961 | 5,3 |
| Donegal | Donegal | 1921 | 1937 | 6,8 |
| Donegal | Donegal | 1977 | 1981 | 5 |
| Donegal | Donegal | 2016 | | 5 |
| Donegal East | Donegal | 1918 | 1921 | 1 |
| Donegal East | Donegal | 1937 | 1961 | 4 |
| Donegal–Leitrim | Donegal / Leitrim | 1969 | 1977 | 3 |
| Donegal North | Donegal | 1918 | 1921 | 1 |
| Donegal North-East | Donegal | 1961 | 1977 | 3 |
| Donegal North-East | Donegal | 1981 | 2016 | 3 |
| Donegal South | Donegal | 1918 | 1921 | 1 |
| Donegal South-West | Donegal | 1961 | 1969 | 3 |
| Donegal South-West | Donegal | 1981 | 2016 | 3 |
| Donegal West | Donegal | 1918 | 1921 | 1 |
| Donegal West | Donegal | 1937 | 1961 | 3 |
| Down | Down | 1921 | 1922 | 8 |
| Down East | Down | 1918 | 1921 | 1 |
| Down Mid | Down | 1918 | 1921 | 1 |
| Down North | Down | 1918 | 1921 | 1 |
| Down South | Down | 1918 | 1921 | 1 |
| Down West | Down | 1918 | 1921 | 1 |
| Dublin Artane | Dublin city | 1977 | 1981 | 3 |
| Dublin Ballyfermot | Dublin city | 1977 | 1981 | 3 |
| Dublin Bay North | Dublin city | 2016 | | 5 |
| Dublin Bay South | Dublin city | 2016 | | 4 |
| Dublin Cabra | Dublin city | 1977 | 1981 | 3 |
| Dublin Central | Dublin city | 1969 | 1977 | 4 |
| Dublin Central (Note: Seats figures from 1981, 1992, 2016 and 2020.) | Dublin city | 1981 | | 5,4,3,4 |
| Dublin Clontarf | Dublin city | 1918 | 1921 | 1 |
| Dublin Clontarf | Dublin city | 1977 | 1981 | 3 |
| Dublin College Green | Dublin city | 1918 | 1921 | 1 |
| Dublin County (Note: Seats figures from 1921, 1923, 1937, 1948 and 1961.) | Dublin | 1921 | 1969 | 6,8,5,3,5 |
| Dublin County Mid | Dublin | 1977 | 1981 | 3 |
| Dublin County North (Note: Seats figures from 1969 and 1977.) | Dublin | 1969 | 1981 | 4,3 |
| Dublin County South | Dublin | 1969 | 1981 | 3 |
| Dublin County West | Dublin | 1977 | 1981 | 3 |
| Dublin Fingal | Fingal | 2016 | | 5 |
| Dublin Finglas | Dublin city | 1977 | 1981 | 3 |
| Dublin Harbour | Dublin city | 1918 | 1921 | 1 |
| Dublin Mid | Dublin city | 1921 | 1923 | 4 |
| Dublin Mid-West (Note: Seats figures from 2002 and 2007.) | South Dublin | 2002 | | 3,4 |
| Dublin County North | Dublin | 1918 | 1921 | 1 |
| Dublin North | Dublin city | 1923 | 1937 | 8 |
| Dublin North (Note: Seats figures from 1981 and 1992.) | Dublin | 1981 | 2016 | 3,4 |
| Dublin North-Central (Note: Seats figures from 1948, 1961, 1977, 1981 and 2007.) | Dublin city | 1948 | 2016 | 3,4,3,4,3 |
| Dublin North-East (Note: Seats figures from 1937, 1948 and 1969. Dublin North-East; Dublin North-West.) | Dublin city | 1937 | 1977 | 3,5,4 |
| Dublin North-East (Note: Seats figures from 1981 and 2002.) | Dublin city | 1981 | 2016 | 4,3 |
| Dublin North-West | Dublin city | 1921 | 1923 | 4 |
| Dublin North-West | Dublin city | 1937 | 1977 | 5,3,4 |
| Dublin North-West (Note: Seats figures from 1981 and 2002.) | Dublin city | 1981 | | 4,3 |
| Dublin Pembroke | Dublin | 1918 | 1921 | 1 |
| Dublin Rathdown | Dún Laoghaire–Rathdown | 2016 | | 3 |
| Dublin Rathmines | Dublin | 1918 | 1921 | 1 |
| Dublin Rathmines West | Dublin city | 1977 | 1981 | 3 |
| Dublin County South | Dublin | 1918 | 1921 | 1 |
| Dublin South | Dublin city | 1921 | 1948 | 4,7 |
| Dublin South | Dublin | 1981 | 2016 | 5 |
| Dublin South-Central (Note: Seats figures from 1948, 1969, 1977, 1981, 1992, 2002 and 2016.) | Dublin city | 1948 | | 5,4,3,5,4,5,4 |
| Dublin South-East (Note: Seats figures from 1948 and 1981.) | Dublin city | 1948 | 2016 | 3,4 |
| Dublin South-West (Note: Seats figures from 1948 and 1969.) | Dublin city | 1948 | 1977 | 5,4 |
| Dublin South-West (Note: Seats figures from 1981, 1992, 2002 and 2016. Dublin South-West; Dublin West.) | Dublin (South Dublin) | 1981 | | 4,5,4,5 |
| Dublin St James's | Dublin city | 1918 | 1921 | 1 |
| Dublin St Michan's | Dublin city | 1918 | 1921 | 1 |
| Dublin St Patrick's | Dublin city | 1918 | 1921 | 1 |
| Dublin St Stephen's Green | Dublin city | 1918 | 1921 | 1 |
| Dublin Townships | Dublin city | 1937 | 1948 | 3 |
| Dublin University (Note: Seats figures from 1918, 1921 and 1923. Dublin University; National University of Ireland.) | Universities | 1918 | 1937 | 2,4,3 |
| Dublin West | Dublin | 1981 | | 5,4,3,4 |
| Dún Laoghaire (Note: Seats figures from 1977, 1981 and 2011.) | Dublin (Dún Laoghaire–Rathdown) | 1977 | | 4,5,4 |
| Dún Laoghaire and Rathdown (Note: Seats figures from 1948 and 1961. Dún Laoghaire and Rathdown; Longford Westmeath.) | Dublin | 1948 | 1977 | 3,4 |
| Fermanagh and Tyrone | Fermanagh / Tyrone | 1921 | 1922 | 8 |
| Fermanagh North | Fermanagh | 1918 | 1921 | 1 |
| Fermanagh South | Fermanagh | 1918 | 1921 | 1 |
| Galway | Galway | 1921 | 1937 | 7,9 |
| Galway Connemara | Galway | 1918 | 1921 | 1 |
| Galway East | Galway | 1918 | 1921 | 1 |
| Galway East | Galway | 1937 | 1948 | 4 |
| Galway East | Galway | 1961 | 1969 | 5 |
| Galway East (Note: Seats figures from 1977, 1981, 1997 and 2016.) | Galway | 1977 | | 4,3,4,3 |
| Galway North | Galway | 1918 | 1921 | 1 |
| Galway North | Galway | 1948 | 1961 | 3 |
| Galway North-East | Galway | 1969 | 1977 | 3 |
| Galway South | Galway | 1918 | 1921 | 1 |
| Galway South | Galway | 1948 | 1961 | 3 |
| Galway West (Note: Seats figures from 1937, 1977 and 1981.) | Galway | 1937 | | 3,4,5 |
| Kerry | Kerry | 1923 | 1937 | 7 |
| Kerry | Kerry | 2016 | | 5 |
| Kerry East | Kerry | 1918 | 1921 | 1 |
| Kerry–Limerick West | Kerry / Limerick | 1921 | 1923 | 8 |
| Kerry North | Kerry | 1918 | 1921 | 1 |
| Kerry North (Note: Seats figures from 1937 and 1961.) | Kerry | 1937 | 2011 | 4,3 |
| Kerry North–West Limerick | Kerry | 2011 | 2016 | 3 |
| Kerry South | Kerry | 1918 | 1921 | 1 |
| Kerry South | Kerry | 1937 | 2016 | 3 |
| Kerry West | Kerry | 1918 | 1921 | 1 |
| Kildare | Kildare | 1923 | 1937 | 3 |
| Kildare (Note: Seats figures from 1948, 1961, 1969 and 1981.) | Kildare | 1948 | 1997 | 3,4,3,5 |
| Kildare North | Kildare | 1918 | 1921 | 1 |
| Kildare North (Note: Seats figures from 1997 and 2007.) | Kildare | 1997 | | 3,4 |
| Kildare South | Kildare | 1918 | 1921 | 1 |
| Kildare South (Note: Seats figures from 1997 and 2020.) | Kildare | 1997 | | 3,4 |
| Kildare–Wicklow | Kildare / Wicklow | 1921 | 1923 | 5 |
| Kilkenny | Kilkenny | 1937 | 1948 | 3 |
| Kilkenny North | Kilkenny | 1918 | 1921 | 1 |
| Kilkenny South | Kilkenny | 1918 | 1921 | 1 |
| King's County | King's | 1918 | 1921 | 1 |
| Laois | Laois | 2016 | 2020 | 3 |
| Laois–Offaly (Note: Constituency spelled Leix–Offaly to 1961, Laoighis–Offaly to 2007) | Laois / Offaly | 1921 | 2016 | 4,5 |
| Laois–Offaly | Laois / Offaly | 2020 | | 5 |
| County Leitrim | Leitrim | 1918 | 1921 | 1 |
| Leitrim | Leitrim | 1937 | 1948 | 3 |
| Leitrim–Roscommon North | Leitrim / Roscommon | 1921 | 1923 | 4 |
| Leitrim–Sligo | Leitrim / Sligo | 1923 | 1937 | 7 |
| Limerick | Limerick | 1923 | 1948 | 7 |
| Limerick | Limerick | 2011 | 2016 | 3 |
| Limerick City | Limerick city | 1918 | 1921 | 1 |
| Limerick City | Limerick | 2011 | | 4 |
| Limerick City–Limerick East | Limerick | 1921 | 1923 | 4 |
| Limerick County | Limerick | 2016 | | 3 |
| Limerick East | Limerick | 1918 | 1921 | 1 |
| Limerick East | Limerick | 1948 | 2011 | 4,5 |
| Limerick West | Limerick | 1918 | 1921 | 1 |
| Limerick West | Limerick | 1948 | 2011 | 3 |
| Londonderry | Londonderry | 1921 | 1922 | 5 |
| Londonderry City | Derry city | 1918 | 1921 | 1 |
| Londonderry North | Londonderry | 1918 | 1921 | 1 |
| Londonderry South | Londonderry | 1918 | 1921 | 1 |
| County Longford | Longford | 1918 | 1921 | 1 |
| Longford–Roscommon | Longford / Roscommon | 1992 | 2007 | 4 |
| Longford–Westmeath | Longford / Westmeath | 1921 | 1937 | 4,5 |
| Longford–Westmeath | Longford / Westmeath | 1948 | 1992 | 5,4 |
| Longford–Westmeath | Longford / Westmeath | 2007 | | 4 |
| Louth | Louth | 1918 | 1921 | 1 |
| Louth (Note: Seats figures from 1923, 1977 and 2011.) | Louth | 1923 | | 3,4,5 |
| Louth–Meath | Louth / Meath | 1921 | 1923 | 5 |
| Mayo (Note: Seats figures from 1997 and 2016.) | Mayo | 1997 | | 5,4 |
| Mayo East | Mayo | 1918 | 1921 | 1 |
| Mayo East | Mayo | 1969 | 1997 | 3 |
| Mayo North | Mayo | 1918 | 1921 | 1 |
| Mayo North (Note: Seats figures from 1923 and 1937.) | Mayo | 1923 | 1969 | 4,3 |
| Mayo North and West | Mayo | 1921 | 1923 | 4 |
| Mayo South | Mayo | 1918 | 1921 | 1 |
| Mayo South | Mayo | 1923 | 1969 | 5,4 |
| Mayo South–Roscommon South | Mayo / Roscommon | 1921 | 1923 | 4 |
| Mayo West | Mayo | 1918 | 1921 | 1 |
| Mayo West | Mayo | 1969 | 1997 | 3 |
| Meath | Meath | 1923 | 1937 | 3 |
| Meath (Note: Seats figures from 1948, 1977 and 1981.) | Meath | 1948 | 2007 | 3,4,5 |
| Meath East | Meath | 2007 | | 3 |
| Meath North | Meath | 1918 | 1921 | 1 |
| Meath South | Meath | 1918 | 1921 | 1 |
| Meath West | Meath | 2007 | | 3 |
| Meath–Westmeath | Meath / Westmeath | 1937 | 1948 | 5 |
| Monaghan | Monaghan | 1921 | 1977 | 3 |
| Monaghan North | Monaghan | 1918 | 1921 | 1 |
| Monaghan South | Monaghan | 1918 | 1921 | 1 |
| National University | Universities | 1918 | 1937 | 1,4,3 |
| Offaly | Offaly | 2016 | 2020 | 3 |
| Queen's County | Queen's | 1918 | 1921 | 1 |
| Queen's University of Belfast | Universities | 1918 | 1921 | 1 |
| Queen's University of Belfast | Universities | 1921 | 1922 | 4 |
| Roscommon | Roscommon | 1923 | 1969 | 4,3,4 |
| Roscommon | Roscommon | 1981 | 1992 | 3 |
| Roscommon–Galway | Roscommon / Galway | 2016 | | 3 |
| Roscommon–Leitrim | Roscommon / Leitrim | 1969 | 1981 | 3 |
| Roscommon–South Leitrim | Roscommon / Leitrim | 2007 | 2016 | 3 |
| Roscommon North | Roscommon | 1918 | 1921 | 1 |
| Roscommon South | Roscommon | 1918 | 1921 | 1 |
| Sligo | Sligo | 1937 | 1948 | 3 |
| Sligo–Leitrim (Note: Seats figures from 1948, 1961, 1969 and 1981.) | Sligo / Leitrim | 1948 | 2007 | 5,4,3,4 |
| Sligo–Leitrim | Sligo / Leitrim | 2016 | | 4 |
| Sligo–North Leitrim | Sligo / Leitrim | 2007 | 2016 | 3 |
| Sligo–Mayo East | Sligo / Mayo | 1921 | 1923 | 5 |
| Sligo North | Sligo | 1918 | 1921 | 1 |
| Sligo South | Sligo | 1918 | 1921 | 1 |
| Tipperary | Tipperary | 2016 | | 5 |
| Tipperary North | Tipperary | 1948 | 2016 | 3 |
| Tipperary East | Tipperary | 1918 | 1921 | 1 |
| Tipperary Mid | Tipperary | 1918 | 1921 | 1 |
| Tipperary Mid, North and South | Tipperary | 1921 | 1923 | 4 |
| Tipperary North | Tipperary | 1918 | 1921 | 1 |
| Tipperary North | Tipperary | 1948 | 2016 | 3 |
| Tipperary South | Tipperary | 1918 | 1921 | 1 |
| Tipperary South (Note: Seats figures from 1948, 1977, 1981 and 1997.) | Tipperary | 1948 | 2016 | 4,3,4,3 |
| Tyrone North East | Tyrone | 1918 | 1921 | 1 |
| Tyrone North West | Tyrone | 1918 | 1921 | 1 |
| Tyrone South | Tyrone | 1918 | 1921 | 1 |
| Waterford (Note: Seats figures from 1923, 1961 and 1977.) | Waterford | 1923 | | 4,3,4 |
| Waterford City | Waterford city | 1918 | 1921 | 1 |
| Waterford County | Waterford | 1918 | 1921 | 1 |
| Waterford–Tipperary East | Waterford / Tipperary | 1921 | 1923 | 5 |
| County Westmeath | Westmeath | 1918 | 1921 | 1 |
| Westmeath | Westmeath | 1992 | 2007 | 3 |
| Wexford (Note: Seats figures from 1921, 1923, 1961 and 1981.) | Wexford | 1921 | | 4,5,4,5 |
| Wexford North | Wexford | 1918 | 1921 | 1 |
| Wexford South | Wexford | 1918 | 1921 | 1 |
| Wicklow (Note: Seats figures from 1923, 1981 and 1992.) | Wicklow | 1923 | | 3,4,5 |
| Wicklow East | Wicklow | 1918 | 1921 | 1 |
| Wicklow West | Wicklow | 1918 | 1921 | 1 |

== See also ==
- Constituencies of the Irish House of Commons for constituencies between 1297 and 1801.
- List of United Kingdom Parliament constituencies in Ireland and Northern Ireland for constituencies in the House of Commons of the United Kingdom
- List of Irish constituencies for a combined list of all Irish constituencies.

== Sources ==
- Walker, B. M., ed. (1978). Parliamentary Election Results in Ireland, 1801–1922. Royal Irish Academy.
- Elliott, Sydney, ed. (1973). Northern Ireland Parliamentary Election Results 1921–1972. Political Reference Publications.
