= Electoral (Amendment) (No. 2) Act 1998 =

Constituencies in use at Dáil elections from 2002 to 2007

Oireachtas
- Long title: AN ACT TO PROVIDE FOR THE NUMBER OF MEMBERS OF DÁIL ÉIREANN AND FOR THE REVISION OF CONSTITUENCIES AND TO AMEND THE LAW RELATING TO THE ELECTION OF SUCH MEMBERS.
- Citation: No. 19 of 1998
- Signed: 16 June 1998
- Commenced: 25 April 2002
- Repealed: 29 April 2007

Legislative history
- Bill citation: No. 30 of 1998
- Introduced by: Minister for the Environment and Local Government (Noel Dempsey)
- Introduced: 20 May 1998

Repeals
- Electoral (Amendment) Act 1995

Repealed by
- Electoral (Amendment) Act 2005
- Status: Repealed

The Electoral (Amendment) (No. 2) Act 1998 (No. 19) was a law of Ireland which revised Dáil constituencies in light of the 1996 census. It took effect on the dissolution of the 28th Dáil on 25 April 2002 and a general election for the 29th Dáil on the revised constituencies took place on 17 May 2002.

In September 1997, the Minister for the Environment and Local Government established an independent Constituency Commission under terms of the Electoral Act 1997. This was the first commission established on a statutory basis, with its terms of reference defined in the legislation. The commission was chaired by Richard Johnson, judge of the High Court, and delivered its report in March 1998. The Act implemented the recommendations of the report and repealed the Electoral (Amendment) Act 1995, which had defined constituencies since the 1997 general election.

It was repealed by the Electoral (Amendment) Act 2005, which created a new schedule of constituencies first used at the 2007 general election for the 30th Dáil held on 24 May 2007.

== Constituencies for the 29th Dáil ==
Explanation of columns

- Created: The year of the election when a constituency of the same name was last created.
- Seats: The number of TDs elected from the constituency under the Act.
- Change: Change in the number of seats since the last distribution of seats (which took effect in 1997).

Constituency	Created	Seats	Change
Carlow–Kilkenny	1948	5	none
Cavan–Monaghan	1977	5	none
Clare	1921	4	none
Cork East	1981	4	none
Cork North-Central	1981	5	none
Cork North-West	1981	3	none
Cork South-Central	1981	5	none
Cork South-West	1961	3	none
Donegal North-East	1981	3	none
Donegal South-West	1981	3	none
Dublin Central	1981	4	none
Dublin Mid-West	2002	3	New
Dublin North	1981	4	none
Dublin North-Central	1948	4	none
Dublin North-East	1981	3	− 1
Dublin North-West	1981	3	− 1
Dublin South	1981	5	none
Dublin South-Central	1948	5	+ 1
Dublin South-East	1948	4	none
Dublin South-West	1981	4	− 1
Dublin West	1981	3	− 1
Dún Laoghaire	1977	5	none
Galway East	1977	4	none
Galway West	1937	5	none
Kerry North	1969	3	none
Kerry South	1937	3	none
Kildare North	1997	3	none
Kildare South	1997	3	none
Laoighis–Offaly	1921	5	none
Limerick East	1948	5	none
Limerick West	1948	3	none
Longford–Roscommon	1992	4	none
Louth	1923	4	none
Mayo	1997	5	none
Meath	1948	5	none
Sligo–Leitrim	1948	4	none
Tipperary North	1948	3	none
Tipperary South	1948	3	none
Waterford	1923	4	none
Westmeath	1992	3	none
Wexford	1921	5	none
Wicklow	1923	5	none

=== Summary of changes ===
This list summarises changes in representation. It does not address revisions to the boundaries of constituencies.

Constituency	Created	Seats	Change
Dublin Mid-West	2002	3	New
Dublin North-East	1981	3	− 1
Dublin North-West	1981	3	− 1
Dublin South-Central	1948	5	+ 1
Dublin South-West	1981	4	− 1
Dublin West	1981	3	− 1
