= Constituencies of the Irish House of Commons =

Pre-1801 Irish constituencies

The Irish House of Commons had 150 constituencies prior to the abolition of the Irish Parliament on 1 January 1801 under the Acts of Union 1800. Each elected two members of parliament to give a total of 300 MPs.

The number of boroughs invited to return members had originally been small (only 55 boroughs existed in 1603) but was doubled by the Stuart monarchs. By the time of the Union, there were 150 constituencies, each electing two members by plurality block voting; an elector could vote for one or two of the candidates, with the two receiving most votes being returned. The constituencies had different franchises as follows:

- 32 county constituencies;
- 8 county borough constituencies;
- 109 borough constituencies, of varying franchises:
- 1 university constituency (Dublin University).

Following the Act of Union, from 1801, there were 100 MPs from Ireland in the House of Commons of the United Kingdom. The Irish constituencies at Westminster were a subset of those in the Irish House of Commons as follows:

- the 32 counties and two most populous county borough constituencies, Cork City and Dublin City, retained two MPs each;
- the 6 other county boroughs, the university, and the 25 most populous boroughs were reduced to one MP each;
- the 84 least populous Irish parliamentary boroughs were disfranchised after the Union.

== History ==
In 1297, representatives were summoned from ten counties - Connacht, Cork, Dublin, Kerry, Kildare, Limerick, Louth, Roscommon, Tipperary and Waterford - and five Liberties - Katherlagh (Carlow), Kilkenny, Meath, Ulster and Wexford - fifteen entities. By 1375, Connacht and Roscommon had ceased to be represented, Kilkenny did not appear, and Kerry and Tipperary had been changed from counties to liberties, and Carlow had been changed from a liberty to a county, leaving seven counties - Carlow, Cork, Dublin, Kildare, Limerick, Louth and Waterford - and five liberties - Kerry, Meath, Tipperary, Ulster and Wexford - twelve entities. When representatives were sent to meet the king in England in 1376, Wexford was listed with the counties (possibly because John Hastings, 2nd Earl of Pembroke and Lord of Wexford, had died in 1375 and the king had custody of his lands), Kilkenny appeared as a liberty and Ulster had ceased to appear, leaving eight counties - Carlow, Cork, Dublin, Kildare, Limerick, Louth, Waterford and Wexford - and four liberties - Kerry, Kilkenny, Meath and Tipperary - twelve entities.

== Constituencies ==
Constituency	Type	County	Creation (Note: The date of either: the earliest Parliament at which it is known to have received a writ of election or sent representatives; or else: the earliest charter or statute granting representation. Outside the Pale, places enfranchised after the Norman conquest often had long periods unrepresented prior to the Tudor reconquest.)	Franchise	Fate after the union
County Antrim	County	Antrim	1570	Freeholders	Two seats
Antrim	Borough	Antrim	1666	Potwalloper	Disfranchised
Ardee	Borough	Louth	1378	Corporation	Disfranchised
Ardfert	Borough	Kerry	1639?	Corporation	Disfranchised
Ards	County	Down	By 1560		Previously disfranchised (Note: The territory of Ards, one of the medieval sheriffdoms of the Earldom of Ulster, was included in the reconstituted County Down in 1570.)
County Armagh	County	Armagh	1585 (September)	Freeholders	Two seats
Armagh	Borough	Armagh	1613 (26 March)	Ecclesiastical corporation - Bishop's borough	One seat
Askeaton	Borough	Limerick	1613 (30 March)	Corporation	Disfranchised
Athboy	Borough	Meath	By 1560 (Note: "Athboy was an ancient borough by prescription with a charter dated 1410, 9 Henry IV. There were further charters of 9 Henry VII and 8 James I all confirming the liberties and privileges of the corporate or free borough.")	Manor	Disfranchised
Athenry	Borough	Galway	1310? (Note: "Athenry was a very old town with writs with grants and charters going back to at least the reign of Edward II. There is one for 14 October 1310 and there are a number for the reign of Richard II in the 1390s.")	Corporation	Disfranchised
Athlone	Borough	Westmeath	1606 (10 December)	Corporation	One seat
Athy	Borough	Kildare	By 1560	Corporation	Disfranchised
Augher	Borough	Tyrone	1613 (15 April)	Corporation	Disfranchised
Ballynakill	Borough	Queen's County	1612 (10 December)	Corporation	Disfranchised
Ballyshannon	Borough	Donegal	1613 (23 March)	Corporation	Disfranchised
Baltimore	Borough	Cork	1613 (25 March)	Potwalloper	Disfranchised
Baltinglass	Borough	Wicklow	1664	Corporation	Disfranchised
Banagher	Borough	King's County	1629	Corporation	Disfranchised
Bandonbridge	Borough	Cork	1613 (30 March)	Corporation	One seat
Bangor	Borough	Down	1613 (18 March)	Corporation	Disfranchised
Bannow	Borough	Wexford	Between 1614 and 1634 (Note: "Bannow was a borough by prescription, and no charter could be found for it in 1800")	Corporation	Disfranchised
Belfast	Borough	Antrim	1613 (27 April)	Corporation	One seat
Belturbet	Borough	Cavan	1613 (30 March)	Corporation	Disfranchised
Blessington	Borough	Wicklow	1670	Corporation	Disfranchised
Boyle	Borough	Roscommon	1613 (25 March)	Corporation	Disfranchised
Callan	Borough	Kilkenny	By 1585 (Note: "Callan was a medieval borough by prescription, with charters and grants from the reigns of Edward III, Richard II and Henry IV.")	Corporation	Disfranchised
Carlingford	Borough	Louth	13? (Note: "Carlingford was another ancient borough, with charters going back to the reign of Edward II.")	Corporation	Disfranchised
County Carlow	County	Carlow	1297 (Note: created as a Liberty)	Freeholders	Two seats
Carlow	Borough	Carlow	1613 (19 April)	Corporation	One seat
Carrick	Borough	Leitrim	1613 (30 March)	Corporation	Disfranchised
Carrickfergus	County borough	Antrim (Note: A separate county corporate.)	1326	Freeholder and householder	One seat
Carysfort	Borough	Wicklow	1629	Corporation	Disfranchised
Cashel	Borough	Tipperary	By 1585 (Note: "Cashel was a medieval foundation said to have been established in the year 1216 by Donat, Archbishop of Cashel, and incorporated under his successor, Marianus O'Brien, in 1233. It had various subsequent charters before it emerged in its modern form by a 1585 charter of 26 Eliz. I and a 1638 charter of Charles I.")	Corporation	One seat
Castlebar	Borough	Mayo	1613 (26 March)	Corporation	Disfranchised
Castlemartyr	Borough	Cork	1676	Corporation	Disfranchised
County Cavan	County	Cavan	1579 or 1584	Freeholders	Two seats
Cavan	Borough	Cavan	1610 (15 November)	Corporation	Disfranchised
Charlemont	Borough	Armagh	1613 (29 April)	Corporation	Disfranchised
Charleville	Borough	Cork	1673	Corporation	Disfranchised
County Clare	County	Clare	By 1376 (Note: It was represented in the Parliament of 1376)	Freeholders	Two seats
Clogher	Borough	Tyrone	By 1613 (Note: "It was probably a borough by prescription confirmed by a 1630 charter, 5 Chas. I ...")	Ecclesiastical corporation - Bishop's borough	Disfranchised
Clonakilty	Borough	Cork	1613 (5 March)	Corporation	Disfranchised
Clonmel	Borough	Tipperary	By 1560	Corporation	One seat
Clonmines	Borough	Wexford	Between 1614 and 1634 (Note: "Clonmines, like Bannow, was a borough by prescription, and no charter was available")	Corporation	Disfranchised
County Coleraine	County	Londonderry	1585 (September)	Freeholders	Previously disfranchised
Coleraine	Borough	Londonderry	1613 (25 March)	Corporation	One seat
Connacht	County	Multiple (Note: The medieval county of Connacht was subdivided in 1570 into the modern counties of Galway and Mayo.)	1297		Previously disfranchised
County Cork	County	Cork	1297	Freeholders	Two seats
Cork City	County borough	Cork	1299	Freeholder and Freemen	Two seats
Dingle	Borough	Kerry	By 1585 (Note: Then called Dengenechoyshe.)	Corporation	Disfranchised
County Donegal	County	Donegal	1585 (September)	Freeholders	Two seats
Donegal Borough	Borough	Donegal	1613 (27 February)	Corporation	Disfranchised
Doneraile	Borough	Cork	1640	Manor	Disfranchised
County Down	County	Down	1570	Freeholders	Two seats
Downpatrick	Borough	Down	By 1585 (Note: "Downpatrick was recognised as early as the reign of Henry IV, when letters of protection were granted to the inhabitants. No charter of incorporation is extant, but it returned two MPs to the 1586-7 parliament of Elizabeth I")	Potwalloper	One seat
Drogheda	County borough	Louth	1299	Freeholders and freemen	One seat
County Dublin	County	Dublin	1297	Freeholders	Two seats
Dublin City	County borough	Dublin	1299	Freeholders and freemen	Two seats
Dublin University	University	Dublin (Note: The University was in the county of the city of Dublin. The electorate was its provost, fellows and scholars.)	1613 (Note: "[I]n 1613 [James I] granted the University a further charter enabling it to return two members of parliament.")	Graduates	One seat
Duleek	Borough	Meath	Between 1614 and 1661 (Note: "Duleek was [an] ancient borough with a charter of Edward IV.")	Corporation	Disfranchised
Dundalk	Borough	Louth	By 1560	Corporation	One seat
Dungannon	Borough	Tyrone	1612 (27 November)	Corporation	One seat
Dungarvan	Borough	Waterford	By 1560	Potwalloper	One seat
Dunleer	Borough	Louth	1679	Corporation	Disfranchised
Ennis	Borough	Clare	1613 (27 February)	Corporation	One seat
Enniscorthy	Borough	Wexford	1613 (25 May)	Corporation	Disfranchised
Enniskillen	Borough	Fermanagh	1613 (27 February)	Corporation	One seat
County Fermanagh	County	Fermanagh	1585 (September)	Freeholders	Two seats
Ferns	County	Wexford	By 1579	Freeholders	Previously disfranchised (Note: The area of Ferns, corresponding to the northern part of County Wexford, was briefly made a separate shire between the 1570s before merging back into Wexford in the 1600s.)
Fethard	Borough	Tipperary	By 1560	Corporation	Disfranchised
Fethard	Borough	Wexford	1613 (15 April)	Corporation	Disfranchised
Fore	Borough	Westmeath	Between 1614 and 1634 (Note: "Fore appears to have been a borough by prescription: the Rolls Office issued a negative certificate to the Commissioners for Union Compensation.")	Corporation	Disfranchised
County Galway	County	Galway	By 1579	Freeholders	Two seats
Galway Town	County borough	Galway	By 1400 (Note: It was represented in the parliaments in the late 14th century)	Freemen	One seat
Gorey (also Newburgh)	Borough	Wexford	1620	Corporation	Disfranchised
Gowran	Borough	Kilkenny	1608 (15 September)	Corporation	Disfranchised
Granard	Borough	Longford	1679	Manor	Disfranchised
Harristown	Borough	Kildare	1684	Corporation	Disfranchised
Hillsborough	Borough	Down	1662	Corporation	Disfranchised
Inistioge	Borough	Kilkenny	By 1585	Corporation	Disfranchised
Jamestown	Borough	Leitrim	1622	Corporation	Disfranchised
Kells	Borough	Meath	By 1560	Corporation	Disfranchised
Kerry	County	Kerry	1297 (Note: at one stage a Liberty)	Freeholders	Two seats
Kilbeggan	Borough	Westmeath	1613 (27 February)	Corporation	Disfranchised
County Kildare	County	Kildare	1297	Freeholders	Two seats
Kildare	Borough	Kildare	By 1560	Corporation	Disfranchised
Kilkenny City	County borough	Kilkenny	1299?	Freeholders and Freemen	One seat
County Kilkenny	County	Kilkenny	1297	Freeholders	Two seats
Killybegs	Borough	Donegal	1616	Corporation	Disfranchised
Killyleagh	Borough	Down	1613 (10 March)	Corporation	Disfranchised
Kilmallock	Borough	Limerick	By 1560	Corporation	Disfranchised
King's County	County	King's County	1556	Freeholders	Two seats
Kinsale	Borough	Cork	1334? (Note: "Kinsale was a medieval borough. The earliest charter extant is that of 1589, 31 Eliz. I, which refers to a 1334 charter of 7 Edw. III")	Corporation and Freemen	One seat
Knocktopher	Borough	Kilkenny	1665	Potwalloper	Disfranchised
Lanesborough	Borough	Longford	1642	Corporation	Disfranchised
County Leitrim	County	Leitrim	1583	Freeholders	Two seats
Lifford	Borough	Donegal	1613 (27 February)	Corporation	Disfranchised
County Limerick	County	Limerick	1297	Freeholders	Two seats
Limerick City	County borough	Limerick	1299	Freeholders and Freemen	One seat
Lisburn	Borough	Antrim	1661	Potwalloper	One seat
Lismore	Borough	Waterford	1613 (6 May)	Manor	Disfranchised
County Londonderry	County	Londonderry	1613	Freeholders	Two seats
Londonderry City	Borough	Londonderry	1613 (29 March) (Note: Previously incorporated as Derry, 11 July 1604.)	Corporation	One seat
County Longford	County	Longford	1571	Freeholders	Two seats
Longford	Borough	Longford	1669	Corporation	Disfranchised
Louth	County	Louth	1297	Freeholders	Two seats
Mallow	Borough	Cork	1613 (27 February)	Manor	One seat
Maryborough	Borough	Queen's County	1571	Corporation	Disfranchised
County Mayo	County	Mayo	By 1579	Freeholders	Two seats
County Meath	County	Meath	1297	Freeholders	Two seats
Midleton	Borough	Cork	1671	Corporation	Disfranchised
County Monaghan	County	Monaghan	1585 (September)	Freeholders	Two seats
Monaghan	Borough	Monaghan	1613 (26 March)	Corporation	Disfranchised
Mullingar	Borough	Westmeath	By 1560	Manor	Disfranchised
Naas	Borough	Kildare	By 1560	Corporation	Disfranchised
Navan	Borough	Meath	1469	Corporation	Disfranchised
New Ross	Borough	Wexford	By 1376 (Note: It sent representatives to England in 1376 to consult with the king and council about the government of Ireland and about an aid for the king.)	Corporation	One seat
Newcastle	Borough	Dublin	1613 (30 March)	Corporation	Disfranchised
Newry	Borough	Down	1613 (27 February)	Potwalloper	One seat
Newtown Limavady	Borough	Londonderry	1613 (30 March)	Corporation	Disfranchised
Newtownards	Borough	Down	1613 (25 March)	Corporation	Disfranchised
Old Leighlin	Borough	Carlow	Between 1614 and 1634	Ecclesiastical corporation - Bishop's borough	Disfranchised
Philipstown	Borough	King's County	1571	Corporation	Disfranchised
Portarlington	Borough	Queen's County	1668	Corporation	One seat
Queen's County	County	Queen's County	1556	Freeholders	Two seats
Randalstown	Borough	Antrim	1683	Freeman / Potwalloper	Disfranchised
Rathcormack	Borough	Cork	Between 1614 and 1692 (Note: "Rathcormack was ... incorporated by charter, which was produced at the Union. Some boroughs, particularly those incorporated before or during the early years of the seventeenth century ... ")	Potwalloper / Manor	Disfranchised
Ratoath	Borough	Meath	Between 1614 and 1661 (Note: "No charter is extant for this borough")	Manor	Disfranchised
County Roscommon	County	Roscommon	1297	Freeholders	Two seats
Roscommon	Borough	Roscommon	1613 (27 February)	Corporation	Disfranchised
St Canice	Borough	Kilkenny (Note: In the county of the city of Kilkenny rather than county Kilkenny.)	Between 1614 and 1661 (Note: "St Canice was a very ancient borough and thought to have been from remote antiquity part of the See of Ossory. In 1606 a patent appears to have been granted by James I, whereby Irishtown was to be a corporation ..., but, the muniments of the temporalities of the Bishops of Ossory having been lost during the troubles, in 1678 Charles II made a new grant of a corporation" ")	Ecclesiastical corporation - Bishop's borough	Disfranchised
St Johnstown	Borough	Donegal	1618	Corporation	Disfranchised
St Johnstown	Borough	Longford	1628	Corporation	Disfranchised
County Sligo	County	Sligo	By 1579	Freeholders	Two seats
Sligo	Borough	Sligo	1613 (30 March)	Corporation	One seat
Strabane	Borough	Tyrone	1613 (18 March)	Corporation	Disfranchised
Swords	Borough	Dublin	By 1585 (Note: "Swords had the distinction of being the most notorious borough in the Irish Parliament. Its charter was lost. The memorial presented by John Beresford and Francis Synge declared that it was 'an ancient borough by prescription'; another memorial declared that it had been enfranchised from 'time immemorial'. The portreeve, James Stewart, said 'that the said corporation is an open borough by Charter' dated 11 April, 5 James II - i.e. 1690! Most memorialists simply stressed that it was of great antiquity.")	Potwalloper	Disfranchised
Taghmon	Borough	Wexford	Between 1614 and 1634 (Note: "Taghmon was a borough by prescription; no charter could be found for it in 1800. It is mentioned in 1642, so it must have existed before then.") (Note: It did not return members in 1613 and returned two members in 1634.)	Corporation	Disfranchised
Tallow	Borough	Waterford	1613 (1 May)	Manor / Potwalloper	Disfranchised
Thomastown	Borough	Kilkenny	1541	Corporation	Disfranchised
County Tipperary	County	Tipperary	1297	Freeholders	Two seats
Cross Tipperary	County	Tipperary	By 1585	Freeholders	Previously disfranchised (Note: Cross Tipperary last returned MPs in 1634, and was definitively merged with Tipperary in 1716.)
Tralee	Borough	Kerry	1613 (31 March)	Corporation	One seat
Trim	Borough	Meath	By 1560	Corporation	Disfranchised
Tuam	Borough	Galway	1613 (30 March)	Corporation	Disfranchised
Tulsk	Borough	Roscommon	1663	Corporation	Disfranchised
Tyrone	County	Tyrone	1585 (September)	Freeholders	Two seats
Liberty of Ulster	County	Multiple (Note: The medieval liberty of Ulster was subdivided in 1570 into the modern counties of Antrim and Down.)	1297		Previously disfranchised
County Waterford	County	Waterford	1297	Freeholders	Two seats
Waterford City	County borough	Waterford	1299	Freemen and freeholders	One seat
County Westmeath	County	Westmeath	1543	Freeholders	Two seats
County Wexford	County	Wexford	1297	Freeholders	Two seats
Wexford	Borough	Wexford	By 1376	Freemen	One seat
County Wicklow	County	Wicklow	1577; (Note: The county of Wicklow created in 1577 seems not to have functioned and ceased to exist some time after 1586) 1606	Freeholders	Two seats
Wicklow	Borough	Wicklow	1613 (30 March)	Corporation	Disfranchised
Youghal	Borough	Cork	1374	Corporation and Freemen	One seat

== Map of boroughs ==
Borough constituencies in the Irish House of Commons

== Sources ==
- Johnston-Liik, Edith Mary, ed. (2002). History of the Irish parliament, 1692–1800. Belfast: Ulster Historical Foundation.
- Johnston-Liik, Edith Mary (2006). MPs in Dublin: Companion to the History of the Irish Parliament 1692-1800. Belfast: Ulster Historical Foundation. ISBN 1903688604.
- House of Lords (1878). Return of the name of every member of the lower house of parliament of England, Scotland, and Ireland, with name of constituency represented, and date of return, from 1213 to 1874. C. Vol. 69-I. HMSO.
- Clarke, Maude V. (1932–34). "William of Windsor in Ireland, 1369-1376". Proceedings of the Royal Irish Academy: Archaeology, Culture, History, Literature. 41: 55–130. JSTOR 25515963.
- Richardson, Henry Gerald; Sayles, George Osborne (1952). The Irish Parliament in the Middle Ages. Philadelphia: University of Pennsylvania Press.
