= Electoral (Amendment) Act 2005 =

Constituencies in use at Dáil elections from 2007 to 2011

Oireachtas
- Long title: AN ACT TO PROVIDE FOR THE NUMBER OF MEMBERS OF DÁIL ÉIREANN AND FOR THE REVISION OF CONSTITUENCIES, TO AMEND THE LAW RELATING TO THE ELECTION OF SUCH MEMBERS AND TO AMEND THE ELECTORAL ACT 1997.
- Citation: No. 16 of 2005
- Signed: 9 July 2005
- Commenced: 9 July 2005 & 29 April 2007

Legislative history
- Bill citation: No. 6 of 2005
- Introduced by: Minister for the Environment, Heritage and Local Government (Dick Roche)
- Introduced: 8 March 2005

Repeals
- Electoral (Amendment) Act 1995

Amended by
- Electoral (Amendment) Act 2009

The Electoral (Amendment) Act 2005 (No. 16) is a law of Ireland which revised Dáil constituencies in light of the 2002 census. The new constituencies took effect on the dissolution of the 29th Dáil on 29 April 2007 and a general election for the 30th Dáil on the revised constituencies took place on 24 May 2007.

== Provisions ==
In July 2003, the Minister for the Environment, Heritage and Local Government established an independent Constituency Commission under terms of the Electoral Act 1997. The commission was chaired by Vivian Lavan, judge of the High Court, and delivered its report in January 2004. The Act implemented the recommendations of this report and repealed the Electoral (Amendment) (No. 2) Act 1998, which had defined constituencies since the 2002 general election. The size of the Dáil remained at 166, arranged in 43 constituencies (an increase in one since the previous revision).

It also made an amendment the Electoral Act 1997 to clarify an issue raised by the Standards in Public Office Commission in relation to the definition of election expenses.

== High Court challenge ==
The Act was challenged in the High Court by Finian McGrath TD and former TD Catherine Murphy on the grounds that it left too many constituencies under or over-represented. The High Court rejected this challenge.

== Repeal of constituencies ==
The schedule of constituencies in this Act was repealed by the Electoral (Amendment) Act 2009, which created a new schedule of constituencies first used at the 2011 general election for the 31st Dáil held on 25 February 2011.

== Constituencies for the 30th Dáil ==
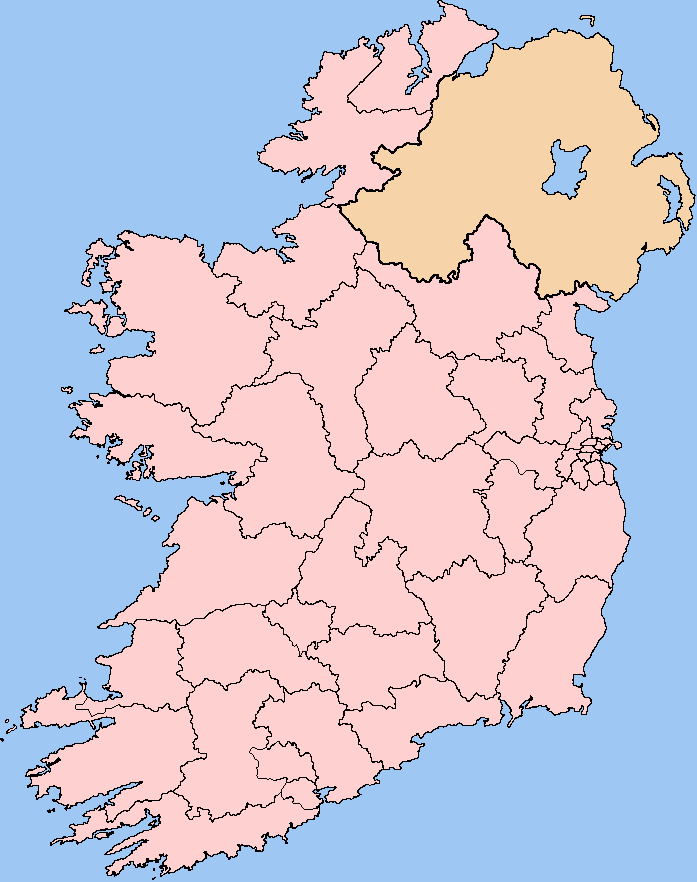
Dáil constituencies for the 2007 general election.

Key to columns

- Created: The year of the election when a constituency of the same name was last created.
- Seats: The number of TDs elected from the constituency under the Act.
- Change: Change in the number of seats since the last distribution of seats (which took effect in 2002).

Constituency	Created	Seats	Change
Carlow–Kilkenny	1948	5	none
Cavan–Monaghan	1977	5	none
Clare	1921	4	none
Cork East	1981	4	none
Cork North-Central	1981	4	− 1
Cork North-West	1981	3	none
Cork South-Central	1981	5	none
Cork South-West	1961	3	none
Donegal North-East	1981	3	none
Donegal South-West	1981	3	none
Dublin Central	1981	4	none
Dublin Mid-West	2002	4	+ 1
Dublin North	1981	4	none
Dublin North-Central	1948	3	− 1
Dublin North-East	1981	3	none
Dublin North-West	1981	3	none
Dublin South	1981	5	none
Dublin South-Central	1948	5	none
Dublin South-East	1948	4	none
Dublin South-West	1981	4	none
Dublin West	1981	3	none
Dún Laoghaire	1977	5	none
Galway East	1977	4	none
Galway West	1937	5	none
Kerry North	1969	3	none
Kerry South	1937	3	none
Kildare North	1997	4	+ 1
Kildare South	1997	3	none
Laois–Offaly	1921	5	none
Limerick East	1948	5	none
Limerick West	1948	3	none
Longford–Westmeath	2007	4	+ 4
Louth	1923	4	none
Mayo	1997	5	none
Meath East	2007	3	+ 3
Meath West	2007	3	+ 3
Roscommon–South Leitrim	2007	3	+ 3
Sligo–North Leitrim	2007	3	+ 3
Tipperary North	1948	3	none
Tipperary South	1948	3	none
Waterford	1923	4	none
Wexford	1921	5	none
Wicklow	1923	5	none

=== Summary of changes ===
This list, and those below, summarises the changes in representation. It does not address revisions to the boundaries of constituencies.

Constituency	Created	Seats	Change
Cork North-Central	1981	4	− 1 seat
Dublin Mid-West	2002	4	+ 1 seat
Dublin North-Central	1948	3	− 1 seat
Kildare North	1997	4	+ 1 seat
Longford–Roscommon	1992	4	abolished
Longford–Westmeath	2007	4	new constituency
Meath	1948	5	abolished
Meath East	2007	3	new constituency
Meath West	2007	3	new constituency
Roscommon–South Leitrim	2007	3	new constituency
Sligo–Leitrim	1948	4	abolished
Sligo–North Leitrim	2007	3	new constituency
Westmeath	1992	3	abolished
