= Edith Johnson =

Edith Johnson may refer to:

- Edith Johnson (actress) (1894–1969), American actress of the silent era
- Edith Johnson (tennis) (1874–1950), English field hockey, tennis and badminton player
- Edith North Johnson (1903–1988), American blues singer, pianist and songwriter
- Edith Cherry Johnson (1879–1961), American journalist
- E. Joy Johnson (1876–1946), American novelist

== See also ==
- Edith Johnston (1930–2008), historian and editor
