= Electoral (Amendment) Act 1990 =

Constituencies in use at Dáil elections from 1992 to 1997

Oireachtas
- Long title: AN ACT TO PROVIDE FOR THE NUMBER OF MEMBERS OF DÁIL ÉIREANN AND FOR THE REVISION OF CONSTITUENCIES AND TO AMEND THE LAW RELATING TO THE ELECTION OF SUCH MEMBERS.
- Citation: No. 36 of 1990
- Signed: 26 December 1990
- Commenced: 26 December 1990 & 5 November 1992
- Repealed: 15 May 1997

Legislative history
- Bill citation: No. 40 of 1990
- Introduced by: Minister for the Environment (Pádraig Flynn)
- Introduced: 23 November 1990

Repeals
- Electoral (Amendment) Act 1983

Repealed by
- Electoral (Amendment) Act 1995
- Status: Repealed

The Electoral (Amendment) Act 1990 (No. 36) was a law of Ireland which revised Dáil constituencies in light of the 1986 census. It took effect on the dissolution of the 26th Dáil on 5 November 1992 and a general election for the 27th Dáil on the revised constituencies took place on 25 November 1992.

It adopted recommendations from an independent Commission chaired by Liam Hamilton, President of the High Court, which delivered its report on 31 July 1990.

It repealed the Electoral (Amendment) Act 1983, which had defined constituencies since the 1987 general election.

It was repealed by the Electoral (Amendment) Act 1995, which created a new schedule of constituencies first used at the 1997 general election for the 28th Dáil held on 6 June 1997.

== Constituencies ==
Constituency	Seats
Carlow–Kilkenny	5
Cavan–Monaghan	5
Clare	4
Cork East	4
Cork North-Central	5
Cork North-West	3
Cork South-Central	5
Cork South-West	3
Donegal North-East	3
Donegal South-West	3
Dublin Central	4
Dublin North	4
Dublin North-Central	4
Dublin North-East	4
Dublin North-West	4
Dublin South	5
Dublin South-Central	4
Dublin South-East	4
Dublin South-West	5
Dublin West	4
Dún Laoghaire	5
Galway East	3
Galway West	5
Kerry North	3
Kerry South	3
Kildare	5
Laoighis–Offaly	5
Limerick East	5
Limerick West	3
Longford–Roscommon	4
Louth	4
Mayo East	3
Mayo West	3
Meath	5
Sligo–Leitrim	4
Tipperary North	3
Tipperary South	4
Waterford	4
Westmeath	3
Wexford	3
Wicklow	5
Total	166

== Summary of changes ==
This list summarises the changes in representation. It does not address revisions to the boundaries of constituencies.

- Longford–Westmeath (4) and Roscommon (3) were replaced with Westmeath (3) and Longford–Roscommon (4)
- Dublin North was increased from 3 to 4 seats
- Dublin Central was reduced from 5 to 4 seats
- Dublin South-West was increased from 4 to 5 seats
- Dublin South-Central was reduced from 5 to 4 seats
- Dublin West was reduced from 5 to 4 seats
- Wicklow was increased from 4 to 5 seats
