= Electoral (Amendment) Act 1995 =

Constituencies in use at Dáil elections from 1997 to 2002

Oireachtas
- Long title: AN ACT TO PROVIDE FOR THE NUMBER OF MEMBERS OF DÁIL ÉIREANN AND FOR THE REVISION OF CONSTITUENCIES AND TO AMEND THE LAW RELATING TO THE ELECTION OF SUCH MEMBERS.
- Citation: No. 21 of 1995
- Signed: 20 July 1995
- Commenced: 20 July 1995 & 15 May 1997
- Repealed: 25 April 2002

Legislative history
- Bill citation: No. 32 of 1995
- Introduced by: Minister for the Environment (Brendan Howlin)
- Introduced: 14 June 1995

Repeals
- Electoral (Amendment) Act 1990

Repealed by
- Electoral (Amendment) (No. 2) Act 1998
- Status: Repealed

The Electoral (Amendment) Act 1995 (No. 21) was a law of Ireland which revised Dáil constituencies in light of the 1991 census. It took effect on the dissolution of the 27th Dáil on 15 May 1997 and a general election for the 28th Dáil on the revised constituencies took place on 6 June 1997.

It adopted recommendations from an independent Commission chaired by Richard Johnson, judge of the High Court, which delivered its report on 27 April 1995.

It repealed the Electoral (Amendment) Act 1990, which had defined constituencies since the 1992 general election.

It was repealed by the Electoral (Amendment) (No. 2) Act 1998, which created a new schedule of constituencies first used at the 2002 general election for the 29th Dáil held on 17 May 2002.

== Constituencies for the 28th Dáil ==
Explanation of columns

- Constituency: The name of the constituency.
- Created: The year of the election when a constituency of the same name was last created.
- Seats: The number of TDs elected from the constituency under the Act.

Constituency	Created	Seats
Carlow–Kilkenny	1948	5
Cavan–Monaghan	1977	5
Clare	1921	4
Cork East	1981	4
Cork North-Central	1981	5
Cork North-West	1981	3
Cork South-Central	1981	5
Cork South-West	1961	3
Donegal North-East	1981	3
Donegal South-West	1981	3
Dublin Central	1981	4
Dublin North	1981	4
Dublin North-Central	1948	4
Dublin North-East	1981	4
Dublin North-West	1981	4
Dublin South	1981	5
Dublin South-Central	1948	4
Dublin South-East	1948	4
Dublin South-West	1981	5
Dublin West	1981	4
Dún Laoghaire	1977	5
Galway East	1977	4
Galway West	1937	5
Kerry North	1969	3
Kerry South	1937	3
Kildare North	1997	3
Kildare South	1997	3
Laoighis–Offaly	1921	5
Limerick East	1948	5
Limerick West	1948	3
Longford–Roscommon	1992	4
Louth	1923	4
Mayo	1997	5
Meath	1948	5
Sligo–Leitrim	1948	4
Tipperary North	1948	3
Tipperary South	1948	3
Waterford	1923	4
Westmeath	1992	3
Wexford	1921	5
Wicklow	1923	5

=== Summary of changes ===
This summarises the changes in representation. It does not address revisions to the boundaries of constituencies.

Constituency	Created	Seats	Change
Galway East	1977	4	+ 1
Kildare	1948	5	abolished
Kildare North	1997	3	new constituency
Kildare South	1997	3	new constituency
Mayo	1997	5	new constituency
Mayo East	1969	3	abolished
Mayo West	1969	3	abolished
Tipperary South	1948	3	− 1

== See also ==
- Elections in the Republic of Ireland
