= Electoral (Amendment) Act 1980 =

Constituencies in use at Dáil elections from 1981 to 1987

Oireachtas
- Long title: AN ACT TO PROVIDE FOR THE NUMBER OF MEMBERS OF DÁIL ÉIREANN AND FOR THE REVISION OF CONSTITUENCIES AND TO AMEND THE LAW RELATING TO THE ELECTION OF SUCH MEMBERS.
- Citation: No. 17 of 1980
- Signed: 1 July 1980
- Commenced: 1 July 1980 & 21 May 1981
- Repealed: 21 January 1987

Legislative history
- Bill citation: No. 20 of 1980
- Introduced by: Minister for the Environment (Sylvester Barrett)
- Introduced: 30 May 1980

Repeals
- Electoral (Amendment) Act 1974

Repealed by
- Electoral (Amendment) Act 1983
- Status: Repealed

The Electoral (Amendment) Act 1980 (No. 17) was a law of Ireland which revised Dáil constituencies. It took effect on the dissolution of the 21st Dáil on 21 May 1981 and a general election for the 22nd Dáil on the revised constituencies took place on 11 June 1981.

This Act repealed the Electoral (Amendment) Act 1974, which had defined constituencies since the 1977 general election.

It was the first revision of Dáil constituencies to adopt recommendations from an independent commission. The commission was established by the government on 9 October 1979. Its members were: Brian Walsh, judge of the Supreme Court and president of the Law Reform Commission, chair; Gerard Meagher, secretary of the Department of the Environment; and Michael Healy, clerk of the Dáil. Its terms of reference were to take into account:

1. the membership of Dáil Éireann to be not less than 166 and not more than 168;
2. geographical considerations, in that the breaching of county boundaries should be avoided, if possible, and that larger-seat constituencies should preferably be situated in areas of greater population density,
3. other well-established characteristics in the formation of constituencies, such as clearly defined natural features, and
4. the retention of the traditional pattern of three-seat, four-seat, and five-seat constituencies.

It delivered its report on 21 April 1980.

The constituencies were also in operation for the duration of the 23rd Dáil elected at the February 1982 general election on 18 February 1982 and the 24th Dáil elected at the November 1982 general election on 24 November 1982.

It was repealed by the Electoral (Amendment) Act 1983, which created a new schedule of constituencies (making minor changes to boundaries in Dublin only) first used at the 1987 general election for the 25th Dáil held on 17 February 1987.

== Constituencies ==
Constituency	Seats
Carlow–Kilkenny	5
Cavan–Monaghan	5
Clare	4
Cork East	4
Cork North-Central	5
Cork North-West	3
Cork South-Central	5
Cork South-West	3
Donegal North-East	3
Donegal South-West	3
Dublin Central	5
Dublin North	3
Dublin North-Central	4
Dublin North-East	4
Dublin North-West	4
Dublin South	5
Dublin South-Central	5
Dublin South-East	4
Dublin South-West	4
Dublin West	5
Dún Laoghaire	5
Galway East	3
Galway West	5
Kerry North	3
Kerry South	3
Kildare	5
Laoighis–Offaly	5
Limerick East	5
Limerick West	3
Longford–Westmeath	4
Louth	4
Mayo East	3
Mayo West	3
Meath	5
Roscommon	3
Sligo–Leitrim	4
Tipperary North	3
Tipperary South	4
Waterford	4
Wexford	5
Wicklow	4
Total	166
