= Electoral (Amendment) Act 1983 =

Constituencies in use at Dáil elections from 1987 to 1992

Oireachtas
- Long title: AN ACT TO PROVIDE FOR THE NUMBER OF MEMBERS OF DÁIL ÉIREANN AND FOR THE REVISION OF CONSTITUENCIES AND TO AMEND THE LAW RELATING TO THE ELECTION OF SUCH MEMBERS
- Citation: No. 36 of 1983
- Signed: 14 December 1983
- Commenced: 14 December 1983 & 21 January 1987
- Repealed: 5 November 1992

Legislative history
- Bill citation: No. 32 of 1983
- Introduced by: Minister for the Environment (Dick Spring)
- Introduced: 15 November 1983

Repeals
- Electoral (Amendment) Act 1980

Repealed by
- Electoral (Amendment) Act 1990
- Status: Repealed

The Electoral (Amendment) Act 1983 (No. 36) was a law of Ireland which revised Dáil constituencies. It took effect on the dissolution of the 24th Dáil on 21 January 1987 and a general election for the 25th Dáil on the revised constituencies took place on 17 February 1987.

It repealed the Electoral (Amendment) Act 1980, which had defined constituencies since the 1981 general election.

In April 1983, the Minister for the Environment Dick Spring established an independent commission on a non-statutory basis to advise on the revision of constituencies based on the results of the 1981 census. Its members were Brian Walsh, judge of the Supreme Court, chair; Dan Turpin, secretary of the Department of the Environment; and Eamon Rayel, clerk of the Dáil. It was to take into account:

The membership of Dáil Éireann to be not less than 164 and not more than 168;

Geographical considerations, in that the breaching of county boundaries should be avoided, if possible, and that larger seat constituencies should preferably be situated in areas of greater population density; other well-established characteristics in the formation of constituencies, such as clearly-defined natural features;

The retention of the traditional pattern of three-seat, four-seat and five-seat constituencies and, in view of the short time which has elapsed since the last review of constituencies, the desirability of effecting the minimum changes.

It delivered its report to the government on 29 July 1983. The change was minimal, with two transfers affecting four constituencies in the city of Dublin.

The constituencies were also in operation for the duration of the 26th Dáil elected at the 1989 general election on 15 June 1989.

It was repealed by the Electoral (Amendment) Act 1990, which created a new schedule of constituencies first used at the 1992 general election for the 27th Dáil held on 25 November 1992.

== Constituencies ==
Constituency	Seats
Carlow–Kilkenny	5
Cavan–Monaghan	5
Clare	4
Cork East	4
Cork North-Central	5
Cork North-West	3
Cork South-Central	5
Cork South-West	3
Donegal North-East	3
Donegal South-West	3
Dublin Central	5
Dublin North	3
Dublin North-Central	4
Dublin North-East	4
Dublin North-West	4
Dublin South	5
Dublin South-Central	5
Dublin South-East	4
Dublin South-West	4
Dublin West	5
Dún Laoghaire	5
Galway East	3
Galway West	5
Kerry North	3
Kerry South	3
Kildare	5
Laoighis–Offaly	5
Limerick East	5
Limerick West	3
Longford–Westmeath	4
Louth	4
Mayo East	3
Mayo West	3
Meath	5
Roscommon	3
Sligo–Leitrim	4
Tipperary North	3
Tipperary South	4
Waterford	4
Wexford	5
Wicklow	4
Total	166
