= Potwalloper =

Parliamentary Borough

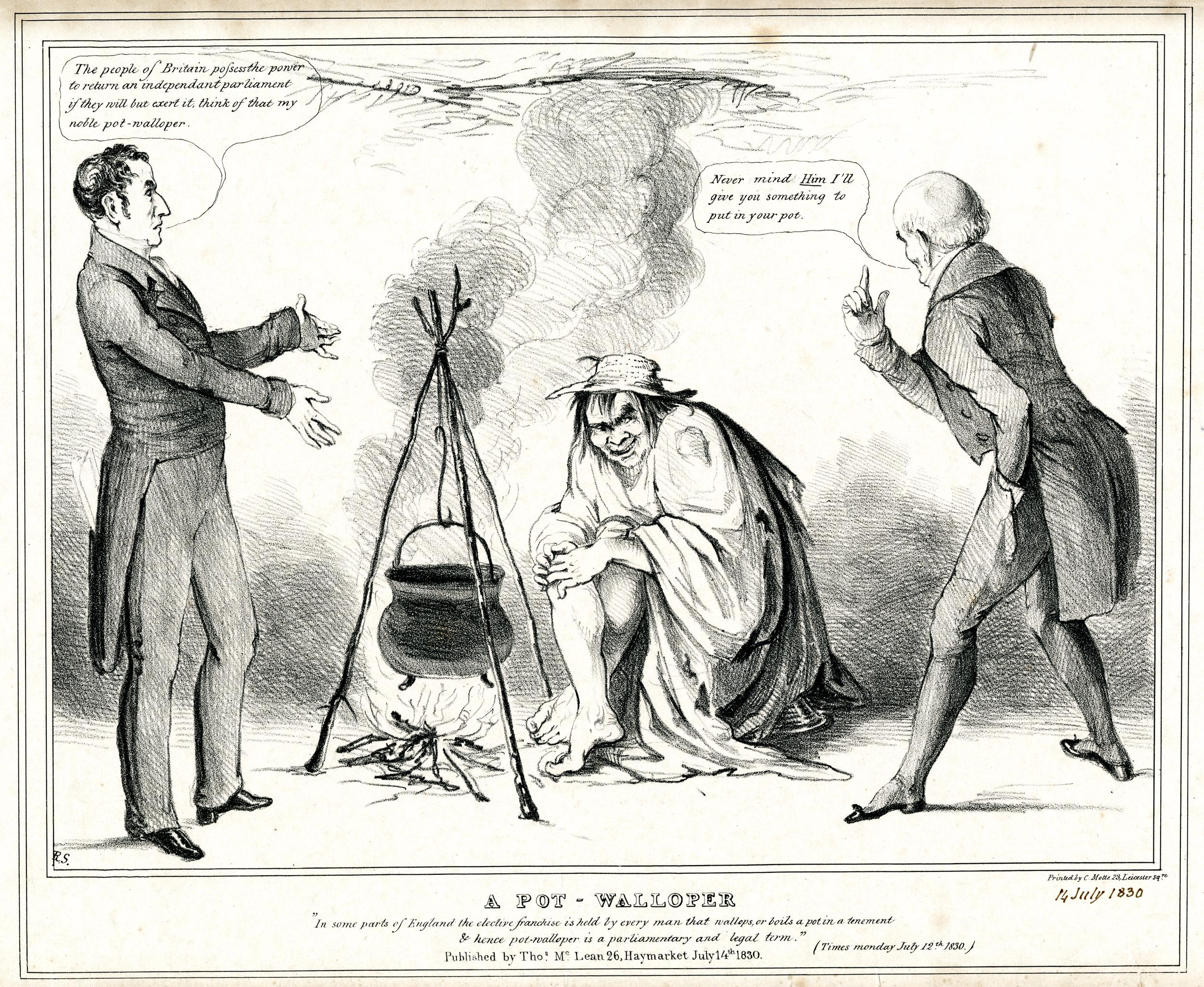
"A Pot-Walloper", Times cartoon of 1830. One politician addresses the scruffily-attired peasant voter: "The people of Britain possess the power to return an independent parliament if they will but exert it, think of that my noble pot-walloper"; on the right, another candidate says "Never mind Him I'll give you something to put in your pot", reflecting fears that poor voters would be easily bribed.

A potwalloper (sometimes potwalloner or potwaller) or householder borough was a voter in a parliamentary borough in which the franchise was extended to the male head of any household with a hearth large enough to boil a cauldron (or "wallop a pot"). Potwallopers existed in the unreformed House of Commons prior to the Reform Act 1832, and in its predecessors the Irish House of Commons and House of Commons of Great Britain (until 1800) and the House of Commons of England (to 1707).

Compared to other types of franchise used by unreformed House of Commons constituencies, potwalloper franchises generally resulted in a larger proportion of the male population of the borough having the right to vote. In the seventeenth and eighteenth century there was a tendency to try and limit the number of eligible electors in potwalloper boroughs by either changing to another franchise or by disenfranchising poorer householders by excluding people supported by the parish through outdoor relief from voting.

== English potwalloper boroughs ==
From the time of the Restoration, the only English boroughs to elect on a potwalloper or inhabitant franchise were:

- Abingdon (1690–1708, and only if electors were not in receipt of alms)
- Amersham (until 1705; electors in receipt of alms were disfranchised in 1690)
- Ashburton (until 1708)
- Aylesbury (only if electors were not in receipt of alms; after 1804 freeholders living near the town were enfranchised also)
- Bedford (providing electors were not in receipt of alms)
- Callington (required one year's continuous residence. The franchise in this borough was in dispute but both definitions amounted to the same people in practice)
- Cirencester
- Hertford (providing electors were not in receipt of alms; freemen voted as well)
- Hindon (providing electors were not in receipt of alms)
- Honiton (1690–1711 and from 1724, but only if electors were not in receipt of alms)
- Ilchester (from 1702, but only if electors were not in receipt of alms)
- Ludgershall (until 1698)
- Milborne Port (until 1702)
- Minehead
- Mitchell (until 1715, and only if electors were not in receipt of alms)
- Northampton (from 1715)
- Pontefract (from 1783)
- Portsmouth (until 1695)
- Preston (from 1768)
- Reading (until 1708)
- St Germans (one year residency)
- Southwark (until 1702, and only if electors were not in receipt of alms)
- Taunton
- Tregony
- Wendover (providing electors were not in receipt of alms)

== Irish potwalloper boroughs ==
There were eleven such potwalloper boroughs in Ireland until the Union with Great Britain in 1801.

- Antrim, County Antrim.
- Baltimore, County Cork.
- Downpatrick, County Down.
- Dungarvan, County Waterford.
- Knocktopher, County Kilkenny.
- Lisburn, County Antrim.
- Lismore, County Waterford.
- Newry, County Down
- Rathcormack, County Cork.
- Swords, County Dublin.
- Tallow, County Waterford

Ireland also had seven "manor boroughs", in which only freeholders voted.

- Athboy, in County Meath.
- Ballinakill, in County Laois.
- Doneraile, in County Cork.
- Granard, in County Longford.
- Mallow, in County Cork.
- Mullingar, in County Westmeath.
- Ratoath, in County Meath.

Before Emancipation only non-Roman Catholics could vote.

== Quotations ==
When Thomas Babington Macaulay complained about the insufficiencies of the suffrage system in the early 19th century, he wrote:

This is an aristocracy, the principle of which is to invest a hundred drunken potwallopers in one place, or the owner of a ruined hovel in another with powers which are withheld from cities renowned in the furthest ends of the earth.

Thomas Hardy, in his first novel, Desperate Remedies, used the term to mean a kind of petit-bourgeois vulgarian:

Ancient pot-wallopers, and thriving shopkeepers, in their intervals of leisure, stood at their shop doors – their toes hanging over the edge of the step, and their obese waists hanging over their toes – and in discourses with friends on the pavement, formulated the course of the improvident, and reduced the children's prospects to a shadow-like attenuation.
