= Westmeath (Dáil constituency) =

Dáil constituency (1992–2007)

- Former Dáil constituency

Former constituency
- Created: 1992
- Abolished: 2007
- Seats: 3
- Local government area: County Westmeath
- Created from: Longford–Westmeath
- Replaced by: Longford–Westmeath

Westmeath was a parliamentary constituency represented in Dáil Éireann, the lower house of the Irish parliament or Oireachtas from 1992 to 2007. The constituency was served by 3 deputies (Teachtaí Dála, commonly known as TDs). The method of election was proportional representation by means of the single transferable vote (PR-STV).

== History ==
The constituency was created in 1992 under the Electoral (Amendment) Act 1990 and was first used for the 1992 general election. It was abolished under the Electoral (Amendment) Act 2005, when it was replaced by the new constituency of Longford–Westmeath.

== Boundaries ==
The constituency spanned the entire area of County Westmeath taking in Mullingar, Athlone and Moate.

== TDs ==
Teachtaí Dála (TDs) for Westmeath 1992–2007
Key to parties: FF = Fianna Fáil; FG = Fine Gael; Lab = Labour
Dáil	Election	Deputy (Party)	Deputy (Party)	Deputy (Party)
27th	1992	Willie Penrose (Lab)	Mary O'Rourke (FF)	Paul McGrath (FG)
28th	1997	Willie Penrose (Lab)	Mary O'Rourke (FF)	Paul McGrath (FG)
29th	2002	Willie Penrose (Lab)	Donie Cassidy (FF)	Paul McGrath (FG)
30th	2007	Constituency abolished. See Longford–Westmeath		

Note: The columns in this table are used only for presentational purposes, and no significance should be attached to the order of columns. For details of the order in which seats were won at each election, see the detailed results of that election.

== Elections ==
*: Outgoing TD

=== 2002 general election ===
2002 general election: Westmeath
Party	Candidate	FPv%	Count		
Party	Candidate	FPv%	1	2	3
Labour	Willie Penrose	26.1	8,967		
Fianna Fáil	Donie Cassidy	22.9	7,892	7,982	8,558
Fianna Fáil	Mary O'Rourke	18.7	6,444	6,491	8,035
Fine Gael	Paul McGrath	16.2	5,570	5,715	8,485
Fine Gael	Nicky McFadden	11.0	3,793	3,824	
Sinn Féin	Niamh Hogg	3.4	1,185	1,216	
Independent	Veronica Lynam	1.3	444	460	
Christian Solidarity	Patrick Walsh	0.4	126	127	
Electorate: 56,054 Valid: 34,421 Spoilt: 557 (1.6%) Quota: 8,606 Turnout: 34,978 (62.4%)

=== 1997 general election ===
1997 general election: Westmeath
Party	Candidate	FPv%	Count			
Party	Candidate	FPv%	1	2	3	4
Labour	Willie Penrose	24.5	8,037	8,271		
Fianna Fáil	Mary O'Rourke	22.2	7,262	7,454	8,233	
Fine Gael	Paul McGrath	15.9	5,218	5,388	5,689	8,449
Fianna Fáil	Henry Abbott	14.4	4,706	4,926	6,830	7,082
Fine Gael	Joe Whelan	10.0	3,266	3,361	3,408	
Fianna Fáil	Camillus Glynn	9.2	3,005	3,198		
National Party	Danny Murray	3.4	1,118			
Independent	Benny Cooney	0.5	175			
Electorate: 49,007 Valid: 32,787 Spoilt: 297 (0.9%) Quota: 8,197 Turnout: 33,084 (67.5%)

=== 1992 general election ===
1992 general election: Westmeath
Party	Candidate	FPv%	Count								
Party	Candidate	FPv%	1	2	3	4	5	6	7	8	9
Fianna Fáil	Mary O'Rourke	24.1	7,396	7,410	7,421	7,432	7,477	7,655	7,918		
Fianna Fáil	Henry Abbott	21.5	6,598	6,603	6,627	6,684	6,750	6,861	6,920	7,080	7,184
Labour	Willie Penrose	20.1	6,182	6,193	6,255	6,309	6,394	6,523	6,701	7,277	7,321
Fine Gael	Paul McGrath	17.4	5,347	5,349	5,407	5,474	5,487	5,558	5,633	7,631	7,648
Fine Gael	Brendan McFadden	9.3	2,849	2,864	2,872	2,886	2,891	2,954	3,149		
Independent	Stephen Price	2.4	747	751	755	767	795				
Independent	Mary Humphreys	2.4	735	748	765	793	823	957			
Sinn Féin	Peter Rogers	1.1	323	325	326	332					
Independent	John Dunne	0.8	242	253	265						
Independent	Declan Geraghty	0.6	198	202							
Independent	Benny Cooney	0.3	86								
Electorate: 46,267 Valid: 30,703 Spoilt: 446 (1.4%) Quota: 7,676 Turnout: 31,149 (67.3%)

== See also ==
- Dáil constituencies
- Politics of the Republic of Ireland
- Historic Dáil constituencies
- Elections in the Republic of Ireland
