= Edith Johnston =

Irish historian and editor (1930–2008)

- Prof. Johnston-Liik
- Born: Edith Mary Johnston; 11 July 1930; Belfast, Northern Ireland
- Died: 25 February 2008 (aged 77); Newtownards, County Down, Northern Ireland
- Education: St Andrews and Queens University Belfast
- Occupation: Historian
- Employer: University of Sheffield
- Known for: Writing
- Spouse: George Liik

Edith Mary Johnston aka Edith Mary Johnston-Liik (11 July 1930 – 25 February 2008) was a historian and editor. She was the first female St. Andrews PhD student to go on to an academic career. She served on the board which created the Dictionary of Irish Biography.

== Biography ==
Johnston was born 11 July 1930 in Belfast, the eldest of three daughters born to John Worthington Johnston (1904–52), an athlete, Presbyterian minister, and army chaplain, and his wife Mary Isobel Giraud (born McFadden). She was educated in Belfast at Richmond Lodge School and then Victoria College, one of the oldest girls’ schools in the British Isles. The University of St Andrews awarded her a first class honours degree in Medieval and Modern History in 1951 and she additionally studied Philosophy and Latin. She stayed on to complete a PhD at St Andrews in 1956, with a thesis entitled ‘The Government of Ireland 1767–85: A Study in Anglo-Irish Political Administration’; this was later developed into the book, Great Britain and Ireland 1760–1800: a study in political administration. This became a series of publications by the University of St Andrews in 1963. After completing her PhD, Johnston gained a Diploma in Education from Queens University Belfast.

Johnston researched Irish history and that became her field of expertise and she specialised in its parliament and administration in the eighteenth-century. In 1956, Johnston was appointed as an assistant lecturer at the University of Sheffield. Her alma mater believes that she was the first female St. Andrews PhD student to go on to an academic career. She taught at Sheffield for twenty years, becoming a senior lecturer in 1965. In 1969, Johnston became the first Warden of the university's Tapton Hall of Residence. Balancing her pastoral duties alongside an academic career was difficult and so she stopped those duties in 1971. Alongside her position at Sheffield, Johnston also held visiting posts at the University of Michigan, Queens University (Ontario) and the University of Delaware. In 1976, Johnston became a Professor and Chair of Modern History at Macquarie University in Sydney, Australia. Her husband and fellow historian, George Liik, was also a member of staff at Macquirie. She remained at Macquarie until she took early retirement after a spell of illness in 1993.

After her retirement, Edith and George moved back to Ireland. Retirement allowed her to conduct further historical research on the Irish parliament, but this was double-edged as she became ineligible for many research grants. With the help of volunteers, and with some financial assistance in the form of a grant from the Irish government in 1999, Edith was able to complete her most ambitious work and in 2002, the six-volume work, The History of the Irish Parliament 1692–1800 was published. During her retirement, Johnston was on the Board of Editors for the Dictionary of Irish Biography. Unfortunately, she did not live to see its publication in November 2009.

Johnston died in Ards Hospital, Newtownards, County Down, on 25 February 2008 and was buried at the Presbyterian church in Ballygawley, County Tyrone.

== Selected publications ==
- Ireland in the Eighteenth Century (1974)
- A Measure of Greatness: the Origins of the Australian Iron and Steel Industry (1998)
- The History of the Irish Parliament 1692–1800 (2002)
