= Law of the Republic of Ireland =

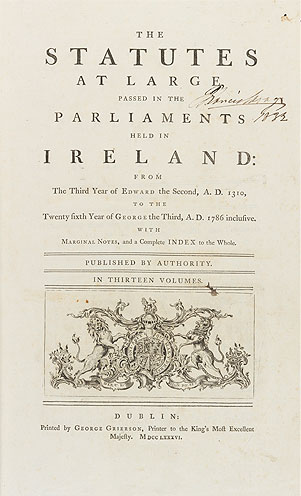
The law now in force in Ireland dates back in excess of 800 years

The law of Ireland consists of constitutional, statutory, and common law. The highest law in the State is the Constitution of Ireland, from which all other law derives its authority. The Republic has a common-law legal system with a written constitution that provides for a parliamentary democracy based on the British parliamentary system, albeit with a popularly elected president, a separation of powers, a developed system of constitutional rights and judicial review of primary legislation.

== History of Irish law ==
The sources of law in both the Republic of Ireland and Northern Ireland reflect Irish history and the various parliaments whose law affected the island of Ireland down through the ages.

=== The Brehon Laws ===
The Brehon Laws were a relatively sophisticated early Irish legal system, the practice of which was only finally wiped out during the Cromwellian conquest of Ireland (ending in 1653). The Brehon laws were a civil legal system only – there was no criminal law. Acts that would today be considered criminal were then dealt with in a similar manner to tort law today. A perpetrator would have to compensate the victim, rather than having a punishment, such as imprisonment, imposed upon him or her.

=== Parliament of Ireland ===
The Parliament of Ireland made laws for the Lordship of Ireland and Kingdom of Ireland from 1297 until the end of 1800.

=== Parliament of the United Kingdom ===
After the kingdoms of Ireland and Great Britain were united in 1800, the Parliament of the United Kingdom made laws for Ireland. This continued in the south until 1922.

=== The first and second Dáil ===
The first (1919-1921) and Second Dáil (1921-1922) sat in opposition to British rule in Ireland. The laws passed by the first and second Dáil had no official legal effect.

== Constitutional law ==
The Irish Constitution was enacted by a popular plebiscite held on 1 July 1937, and came into force on 29 December of the same year. The Constitution is the cornerstone of the Irish legal system and is held to be the source of power exercised by the legislative, judicial and executive branches of government. The Irish Supreme Court and High Court exercise judicial review over all legislation and may strike down laws if they are inconsistent with the constitution.

The Constitution can be amended only by referendum. A proposal to amend the Constitution is introduced into Dáil Éireann (the lower house of parliament) as a bill and if passed by the Dáil, and passed or deemed to have been passed by the Senate (the upper house), is put to the people. Only Irish citizens resident in the state may vote. There is no threshold for such referendums and a simple majority of voters is sufficient for a proposal to be passed. Once passed by the people, the President signs the referendum bill into law. As of November 2011, there have been 33 such referendums: 23 of which were approved by the people and 10 of which were rejected. The constitution was also amended twice during an initial transitional period of three years following the election of the first President of Ireland when amendments could be made without recourse to the people.

== Statute law ==
Modern-day statute law is made by the bicameral National Parliament — more commonly known by its Irish name, the Oireachtas. Acts of the Oireachtas are split into sequentially numbered sections and may be cited by using a short title which gives the act a title roughly based on its subject matter and the year in which it was enacted. While the Oireachtas is bicameral, the upper house, the Senate (or Seanad), has little power which at most allows the Senate to delay rather than veto legislation, something that has only happened twice since 1937.

Article 50 of the Constitution of Ireland carried over all laws that had been in force in the Irish Free State prior to its coming into force on 29 December 1937, insofar as these laws were not repugnant to the new constitution. A similar function had been fulfilled by Article 73 of the Constitution of the Irish Free State, which carried overall legislation that had in force in Southern Ireland, insofar as these laws were not repugnant to the Constitution of the Irish Free State. As a result, while the Irish state has been in existence for a century, the statute book stretches back in excess of 800 years. By virtue of the Statute Law Revision Act 2007, the oldest Act currently in force in Ireland is the Fairs Act 1204. The statute law of Ireland includes law passed by the following:

- Pre-union Irish statutes
  - the King of England as a lawgiver for Ireland, and the Parliament of Ireland (1169–1800)
- English and British statutes, which applied to Ireland in their original enactment or were subsequently applied to Ireland
  - the King of England (1066–1241)
  - the Parliament of England (1241–1706)
  - the Parliament of Great Britain (1707–1800)
- Statutes of the United Kingdom of Great Britain and Ireland
  - the Parliament of the United Kingdom, which applied to Ireland in their original enactment or were subsequently applied to Ireland (1 January 1801 to 5 December 1922)
- Statutes of the independent Irish state since December 1922 (this state being known by various names, such as the Irish Free State and the Ireland, etc.)
  - the Oireachtas of the Irish Free State (6 December 1922 to 28 December 1937)
  - the present Oireachtas (from 29 December 1937 to date)

== Secondary legislation ==
Notwithstanding the declaration in the 1937 constitution that the Oireachtas is to be "the sole and exclusive" legislature, it has long been held that it is permissible for the Oireachtas to delegate its law-making power(s) to other bodies as long as such delegated legislation does not exceed the "principles and policies" set out in the relevant authorising statute.

All instances of delegated legislation in Ireland are known as statutory instruments, although only a small subset of these are numbered as statutory instruments and published by the Stationery Office. This latter subset is composed of statutory instruments which are required to be laid before the Oireachtas or which are of general application.

In addition, a body of charters, statutory rules and orders and other secondary legislation made prior to the independence of the Irish Free State in 1922 continues to be in force currently in Ireland, insofar as such legislation has not been revoked or otherwise ceased to be in force.

== Common law ==
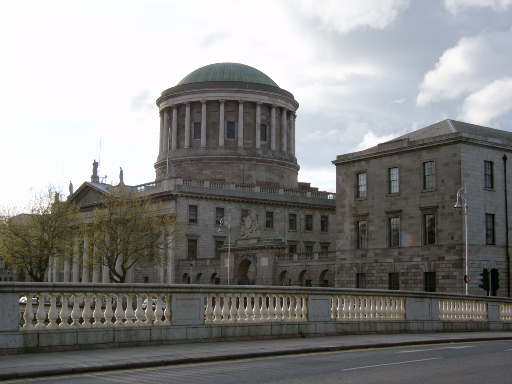
The Supreme Court of Ireland sits in the Four Courts building in Dublin.

Ireland was the subject of the first extension of England's common law legal system outside England. While in England the creation of the common law was largely the result of the assimilation of existing customary law, in Ireland the common law was imported from England supplanting the customary law of the Irish. This, however, was a gradual process which went hand-in-hand with English (and later, British) influence in Ireland.

As with any common-law system, the Irish courts are bound by the doctrine of stare decisis to apply clear precedents set by higher courts and courts of co-ordinate jurisdiction. The main exception to this rule is that the Supreme Court has declared itself not to be bound by its own previous decisions.

While the doctrine clearly means that the present High Court is bound by decisions of the present Supreme Court, it is not altogether clear whether the decisions of courts which previously performed the function of courts of last final appeal in Ireland – such as the British House of Lords – bind the present High Court. In Irish Shell v. Elm Motors, Mr Justice McCarthy doubted that decisions of pre-independence courts bound the courts of the state, stating that "[i]n no sense are our Courts a continuation of, or successors to, the British courts." However, the other two judges on the panel hearing the case declined to express an opinion on the matter as it had not been argued at the hearing of the appeal.

Post-independence judgments of the British courts, and all judgments of the American and Commonwealth courts, as well as some judgments of courts in Northern Ireland, are of persuasive value only and do not bind the courts of Ireland.

== European Union law ==
The European Communities Act 1972, as amended, provides that treaties of the European Union are part of Irish law, along with directly effective measures adopted under those treaties. It also provides that government ministers may adopt statutory instruments to implement European Union law and that as an exception to the general rule such statutory instruments have effect as if they were primary legislation.

== International law ==
Ireland is a dualist state and treaties are not part of Irish domestic law unless incorporated by the Oireachtas. An exception to this rule might well be the provision in the constitution which says that "Ireland accepts the generally recognised principles of international law as its rule of conduct in its relations with other States." However, while this provision has been held to assimilate the doctrine of sovereign immunity into domestic law, the Supreme Court has held that the provision is not capable of conferring rights on individuals.

The dualist approach in international law contained in the Irish Constitution allows the state to sign and ratify treaties without incorporating them into domestic law. Thus, while Ireland was one of the first states in Europe to ratify the European Convention on Human Rights, it was one of the last to incorporate the Convention into domestic law. And when done it was not directly incorporated into Irish law but given indirect, sub-constitutional, interpretative incorporation.

In Crotty v. An Taoiseach, the Irish Supreme Court asserted a power to review the constitutionality of treaties signed by the state, such that the government could be prevented from signing international agreements which would be contrary to the constitution. This ruling has resulted in ad hoc amendments to the constitution to permit the state to ratify treaties that might otherwise have been contrary to the constitution.

== See also ==
- Irish Statute Book
- Legal systems of the world
- Courts of the Republic of Ireland
  - Supreme Court
  - High Court
  - Special Criminal Court
- Northern Ireland law
